= List of places in Cumbria =

This is a list of cities, towns and villages in the county of Cumbria, England.

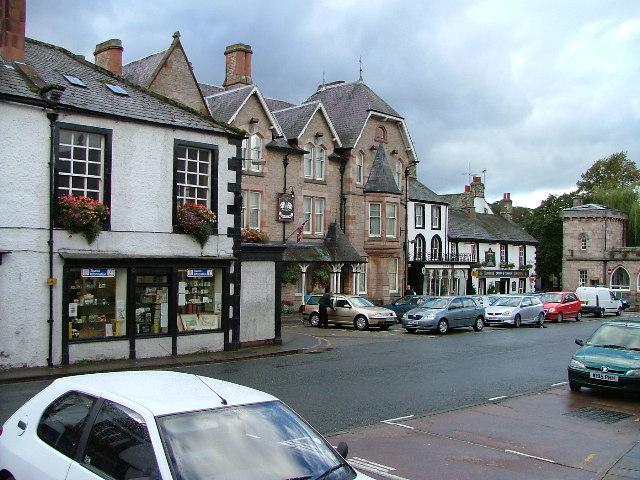
Appleby Market Square

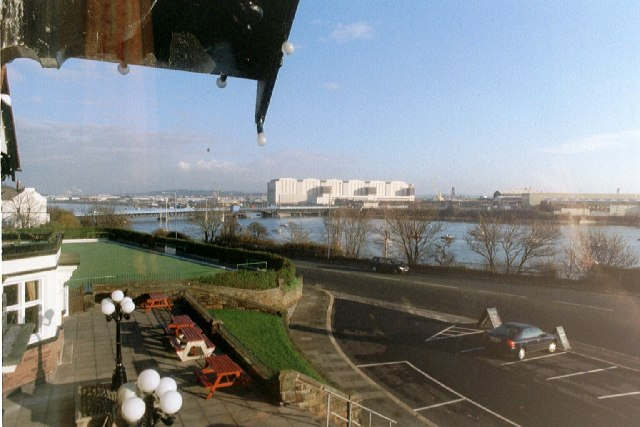
Central Barrow-in-Furness skyline

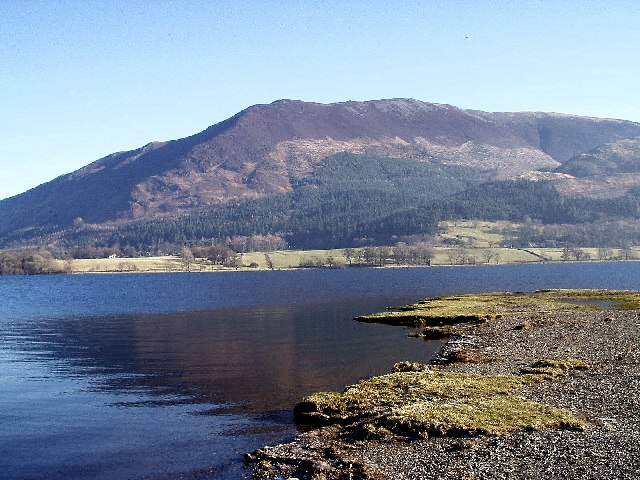
Bassenthwaite Lake

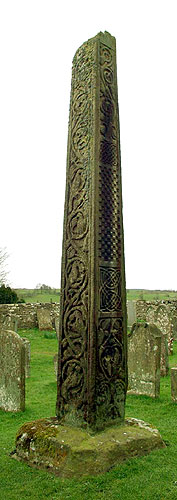
Bewcastle Cross

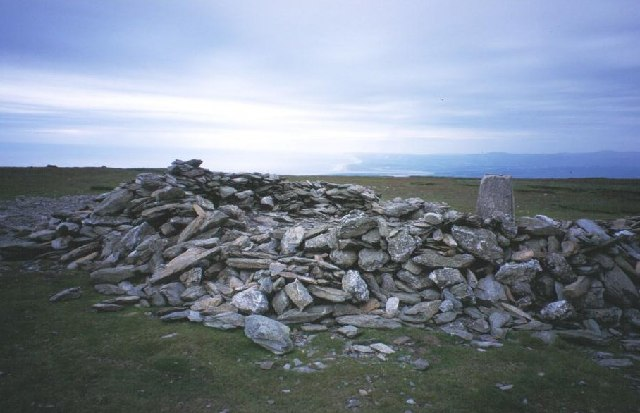
Black Combe cairn

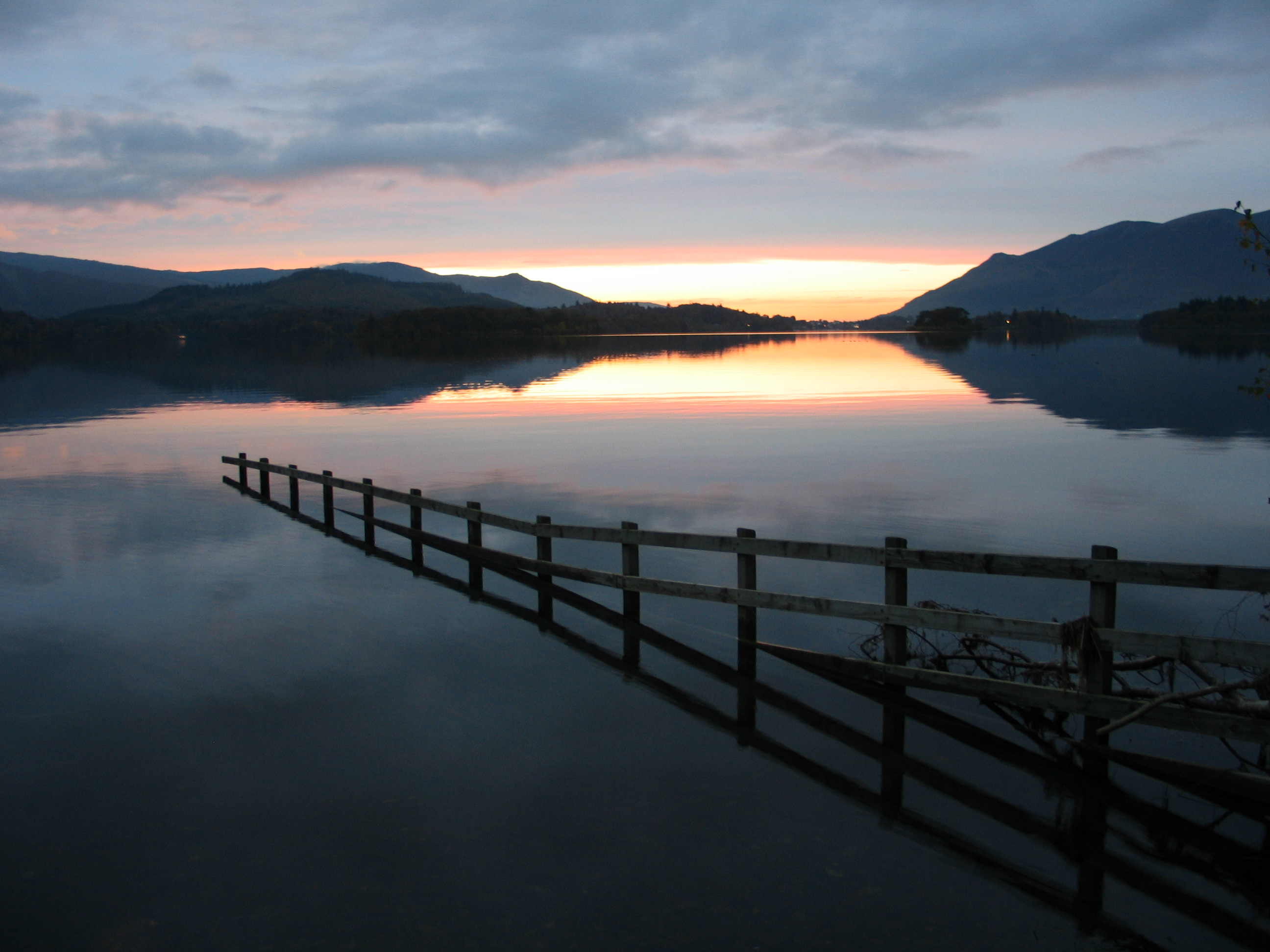
Borrowdale

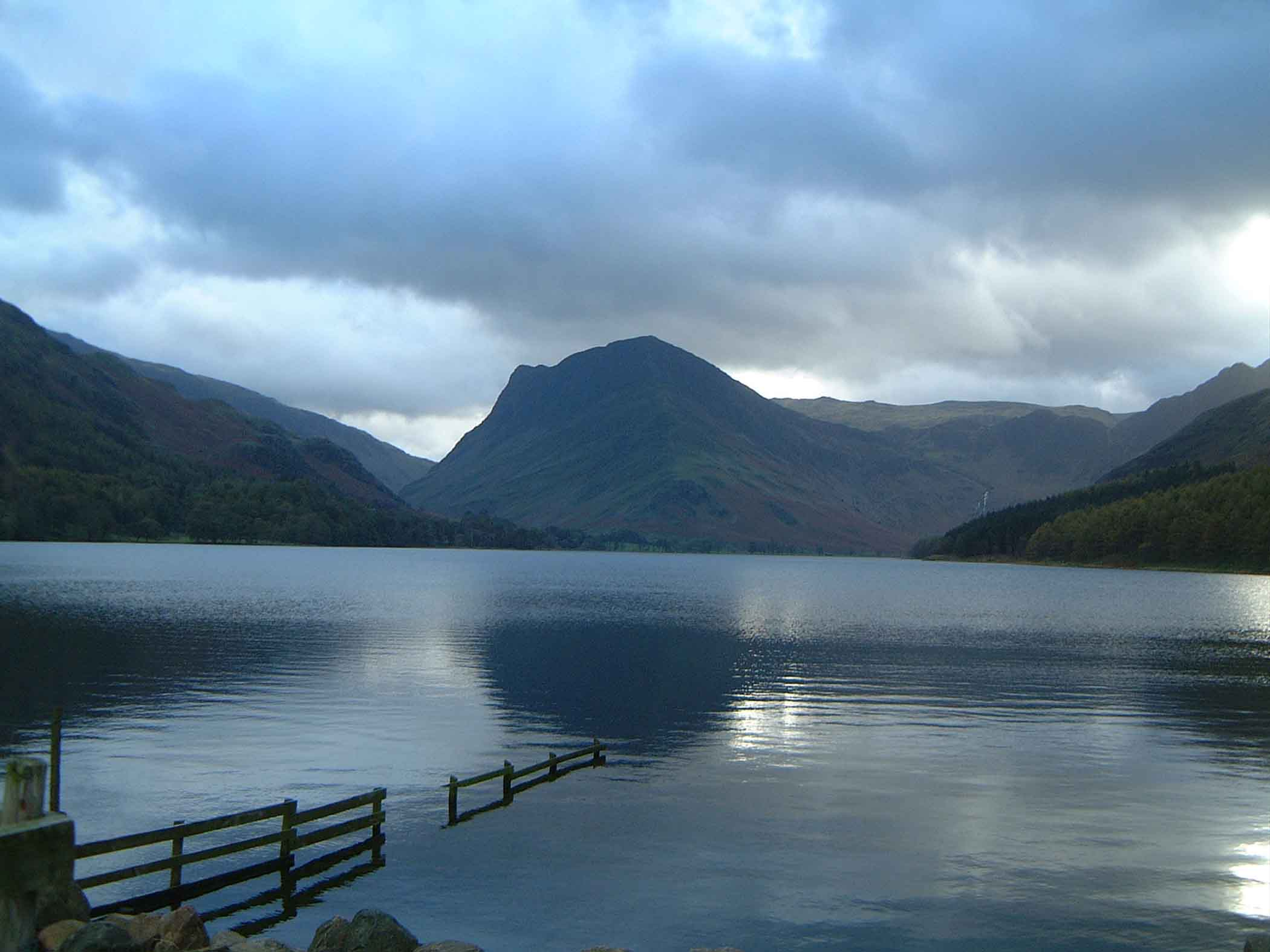
Buttermere

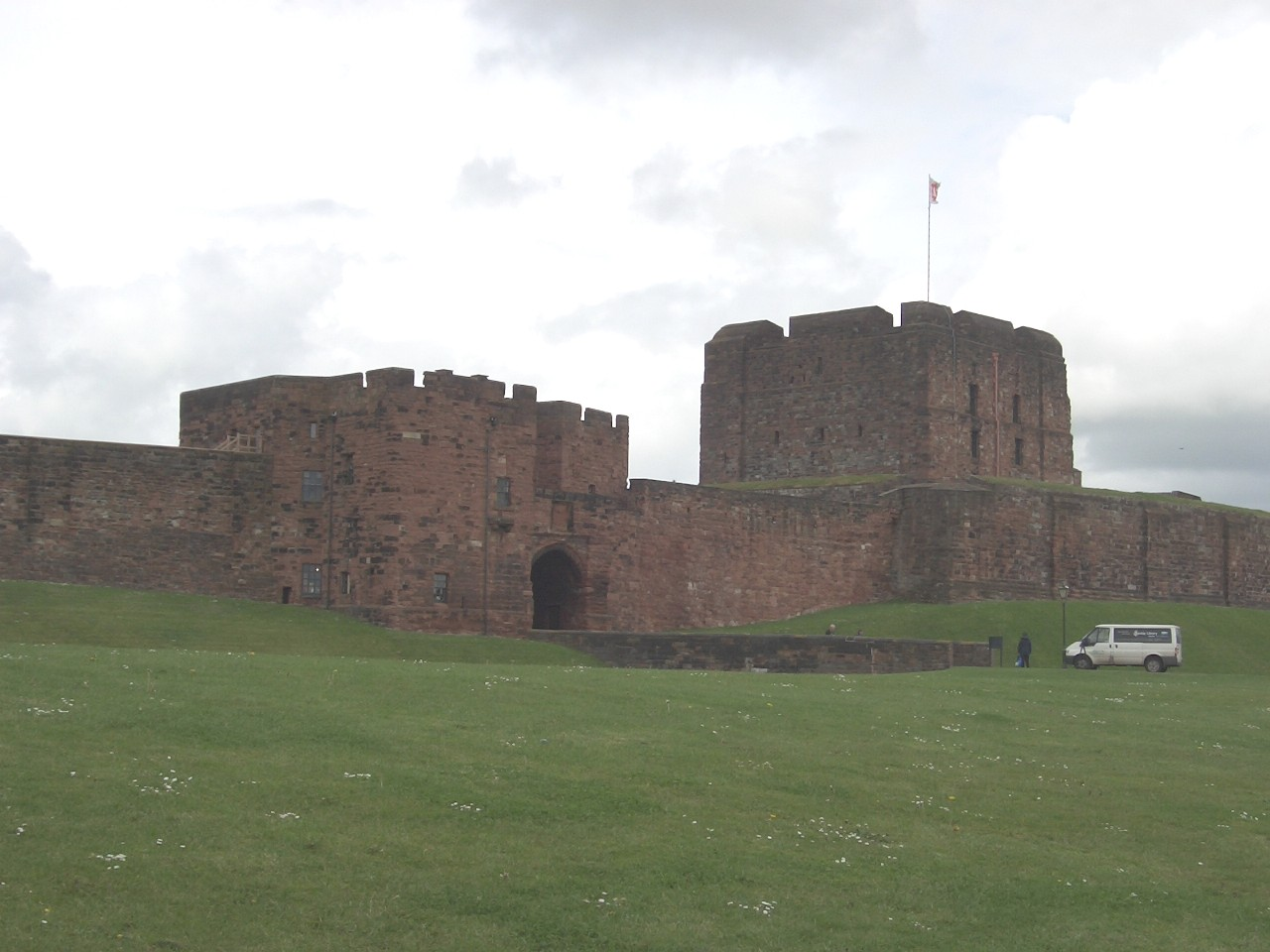
Carlisle Castle

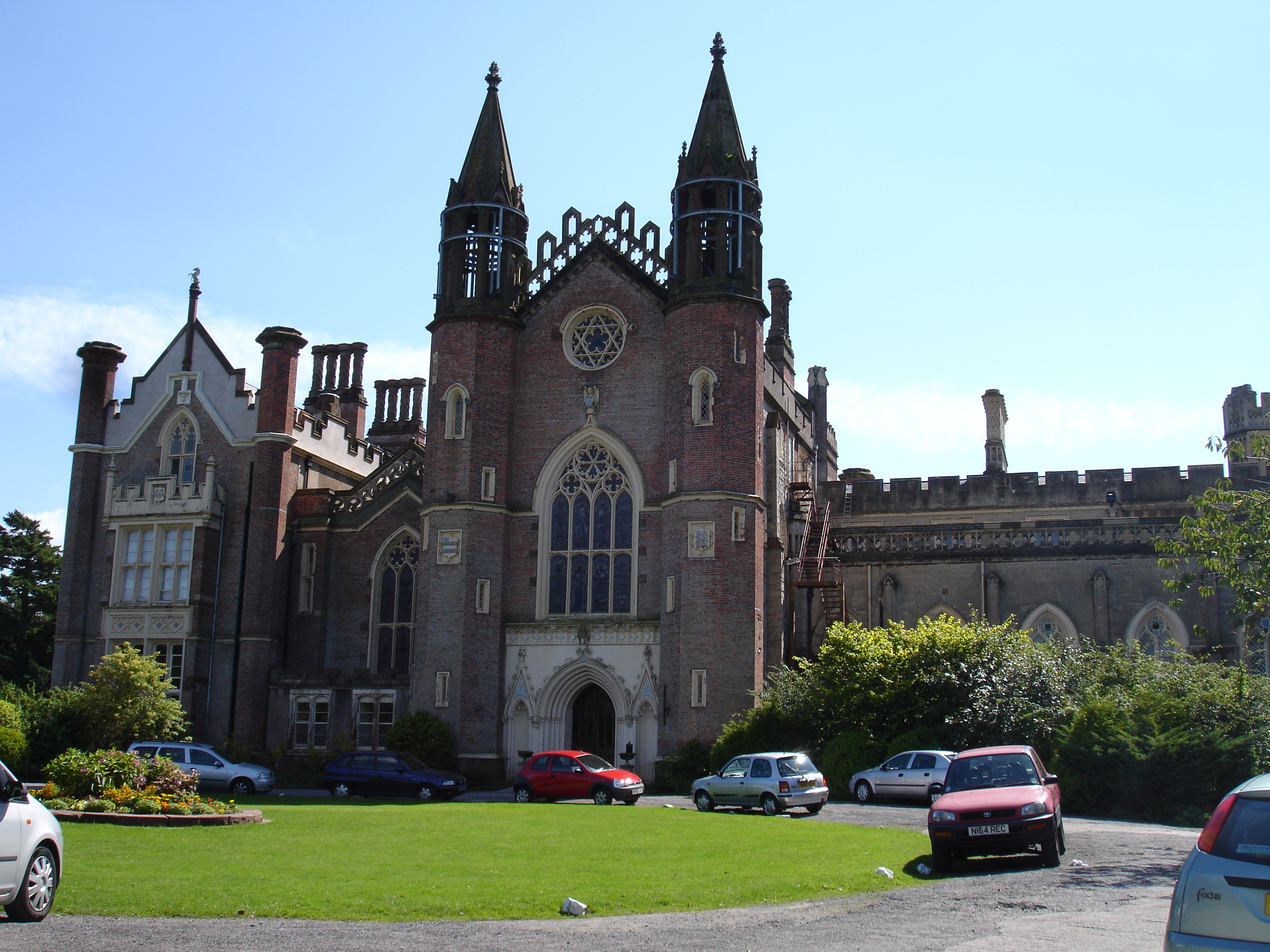
Conishead Priory near Ulverston

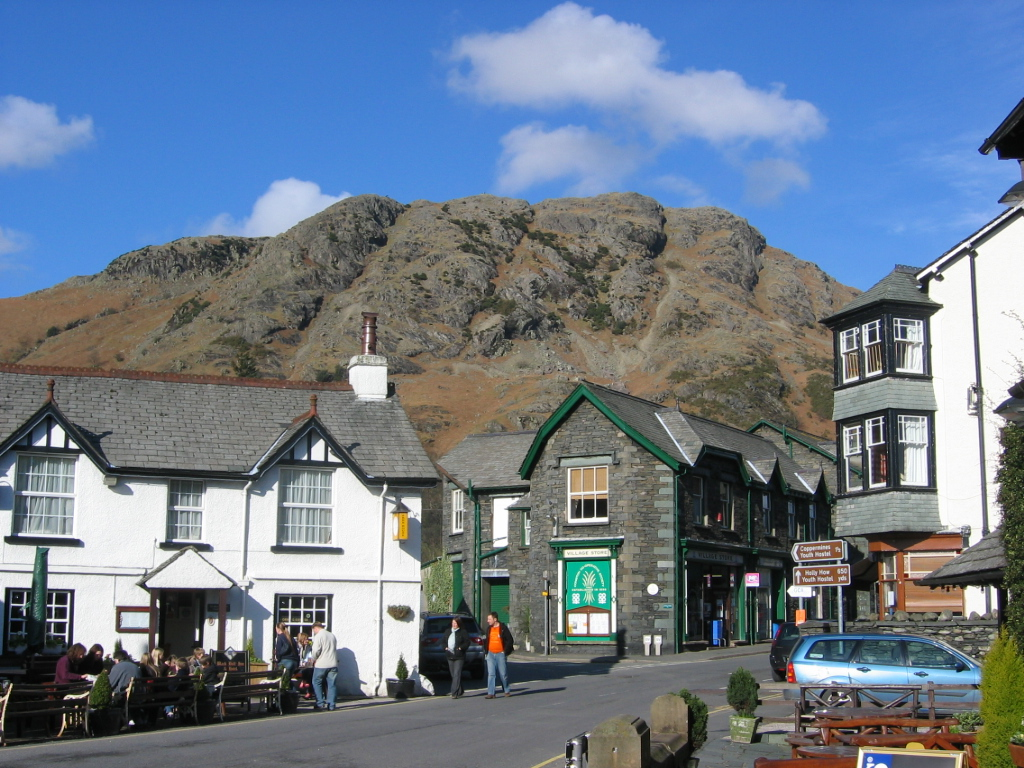
Coniston

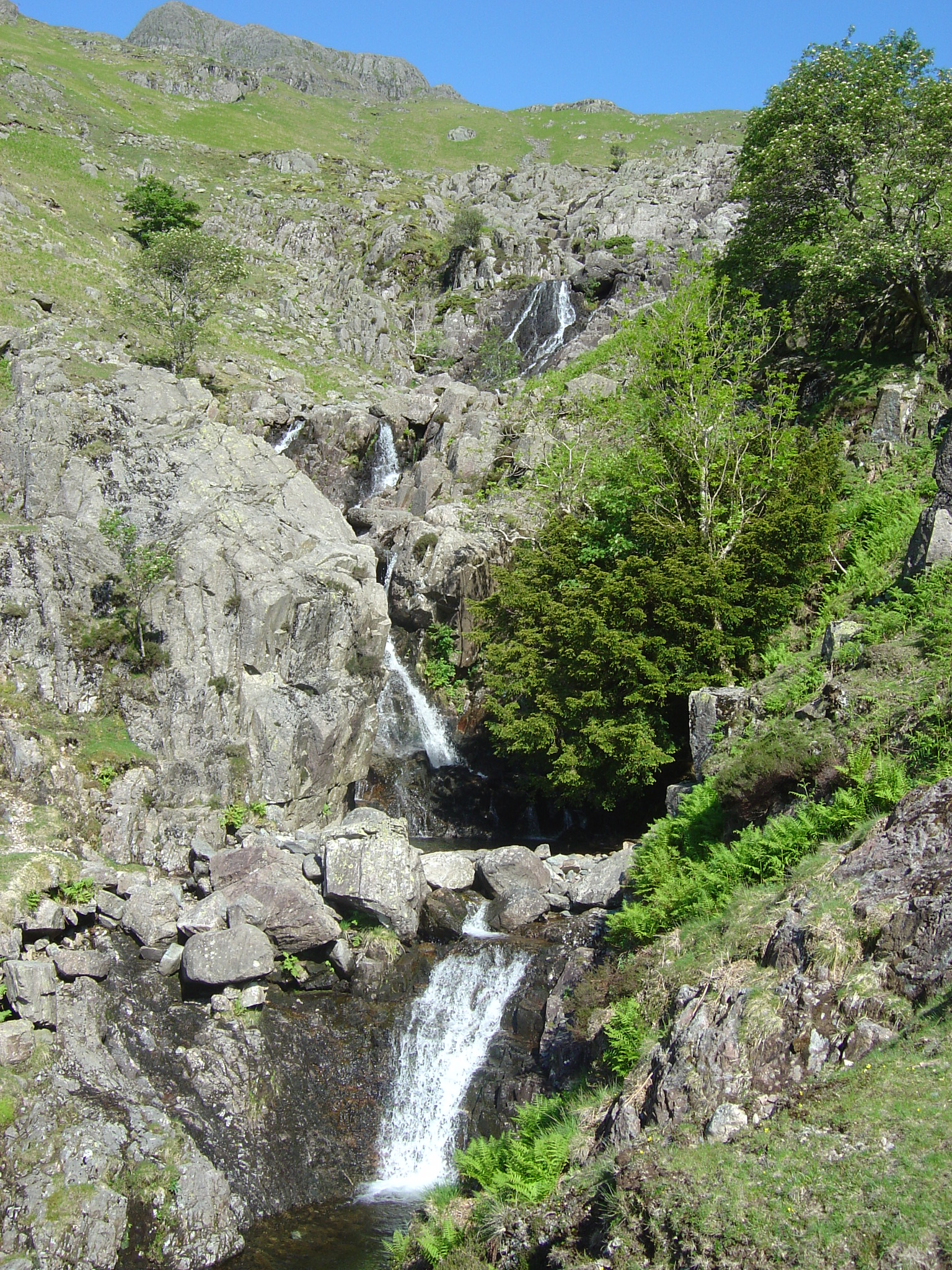
Dungeon Ghyll

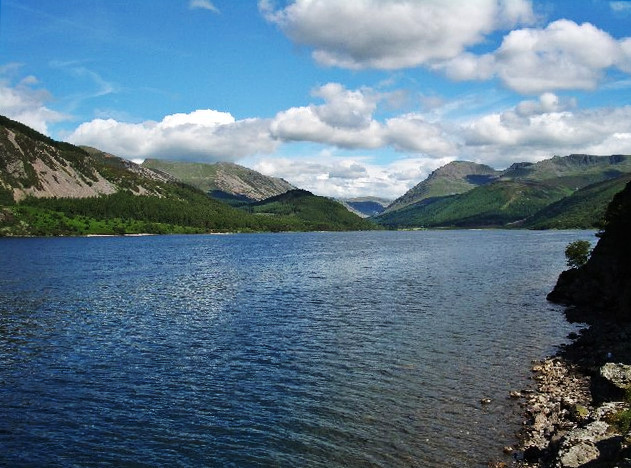
Ennerdale Water

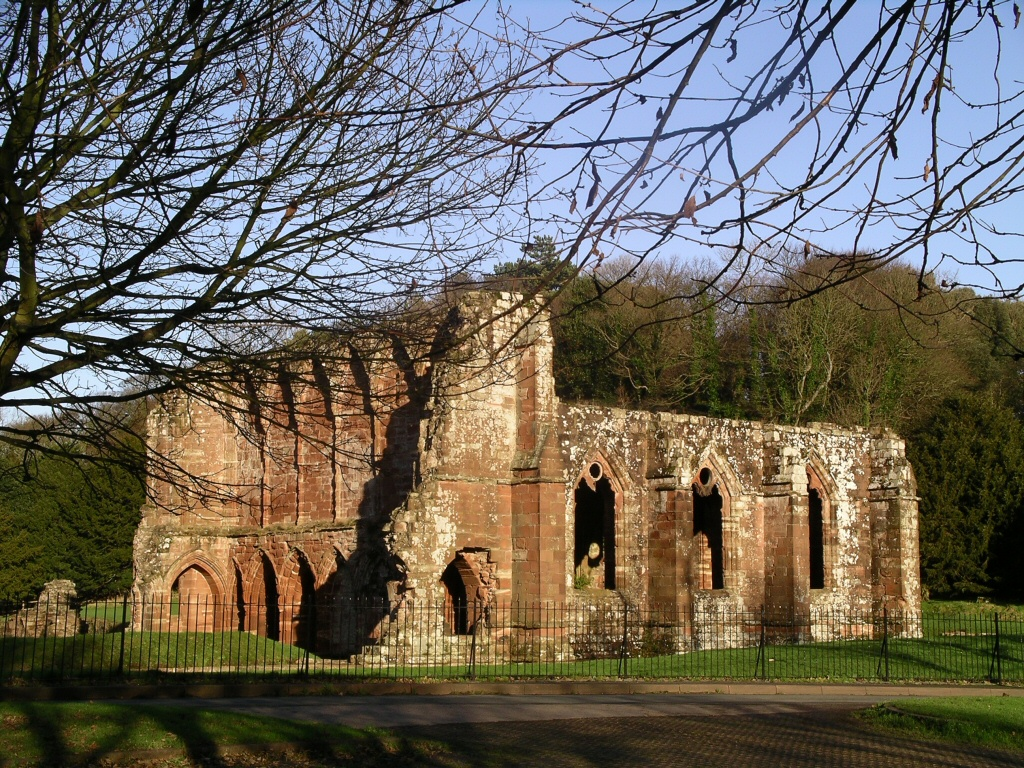
Furness Abbey

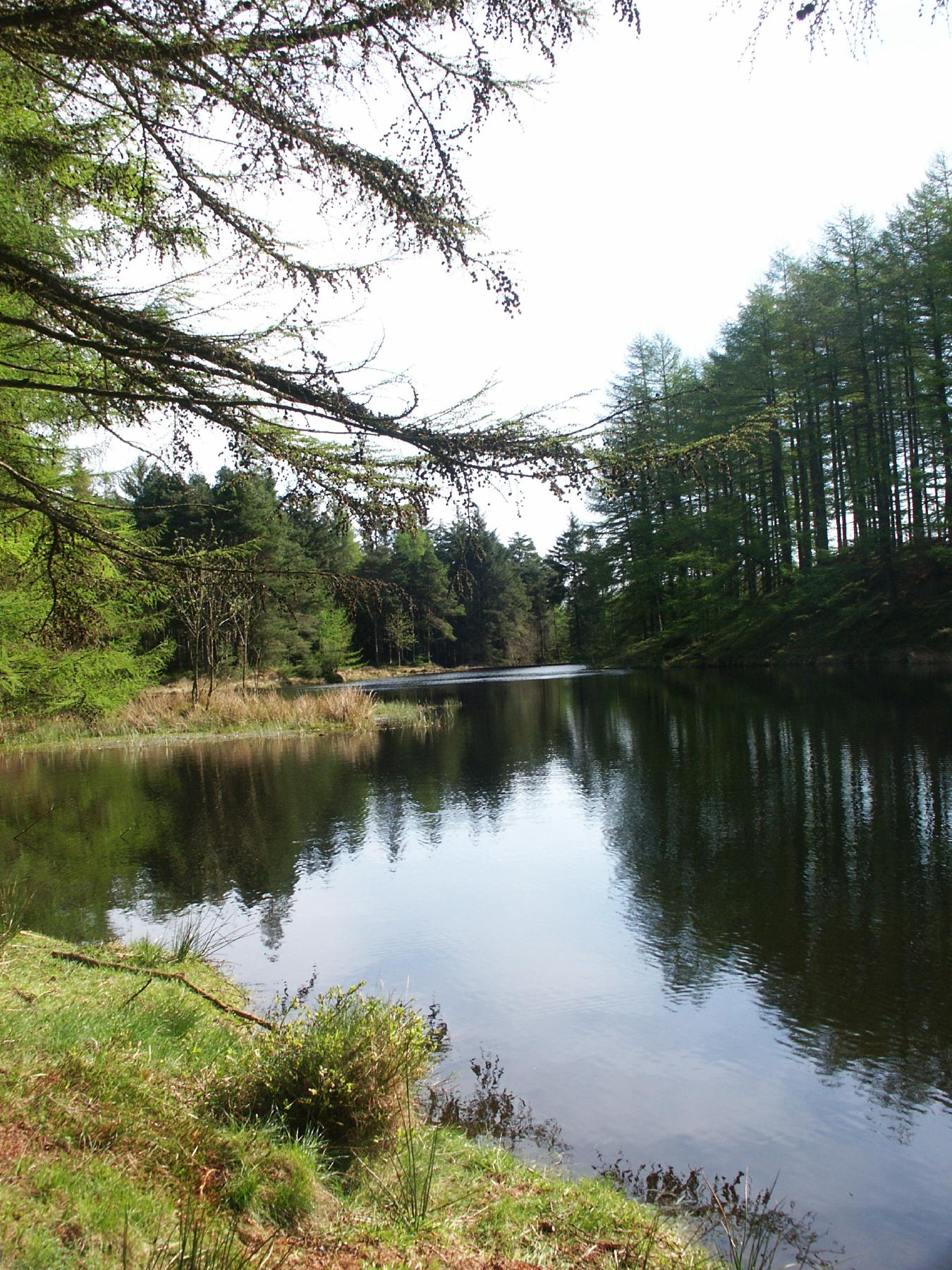
Grizedale Tarn

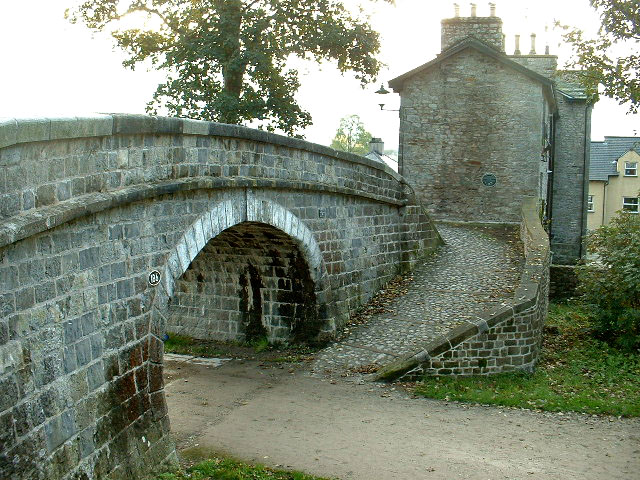
Kendal, canal change bridge

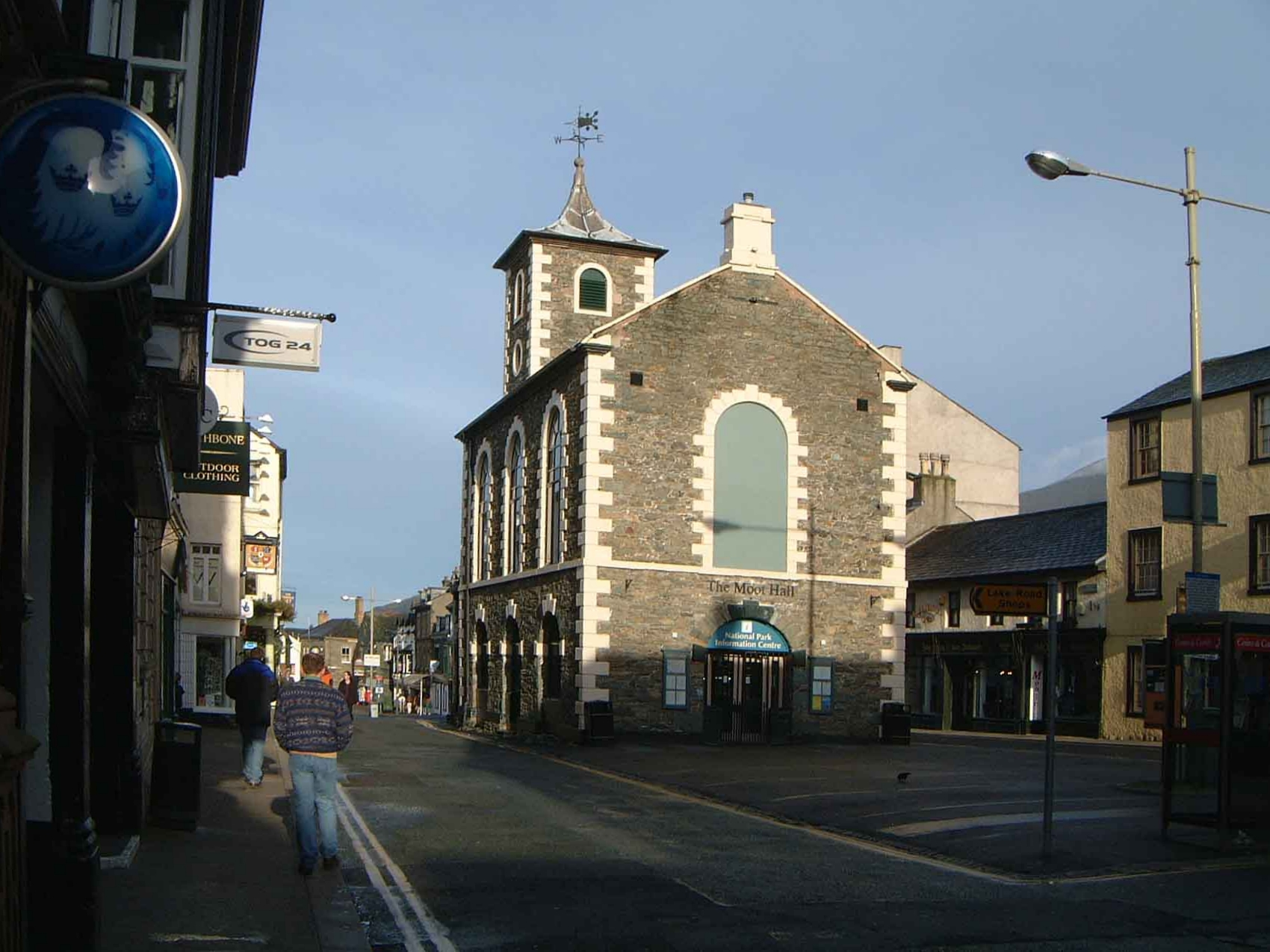
Keswick, Moot Hall

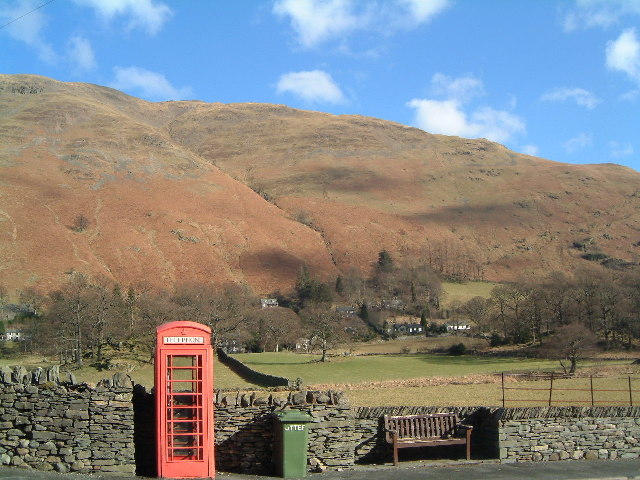
Patterdale village

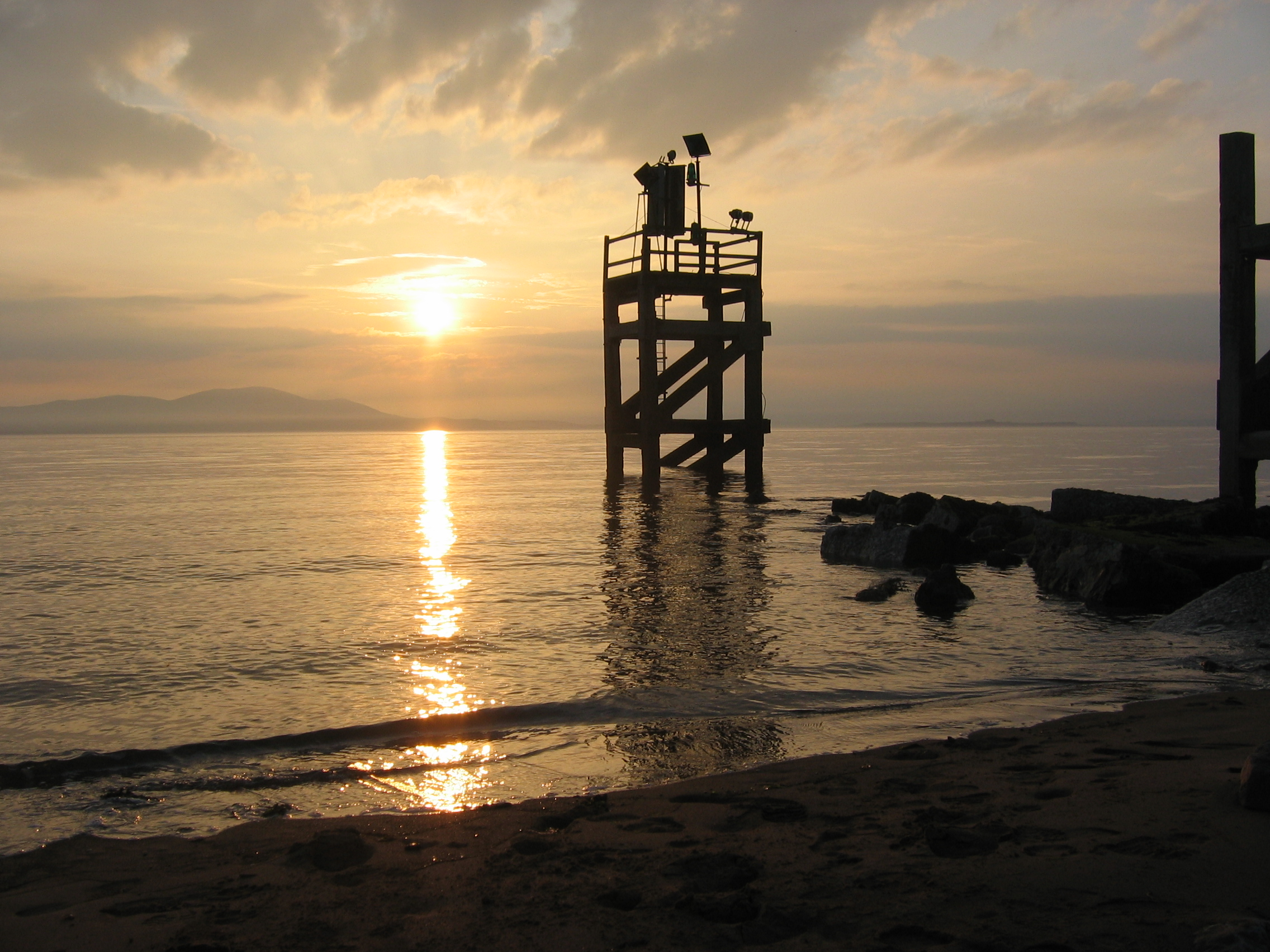
Silloth, West Beach

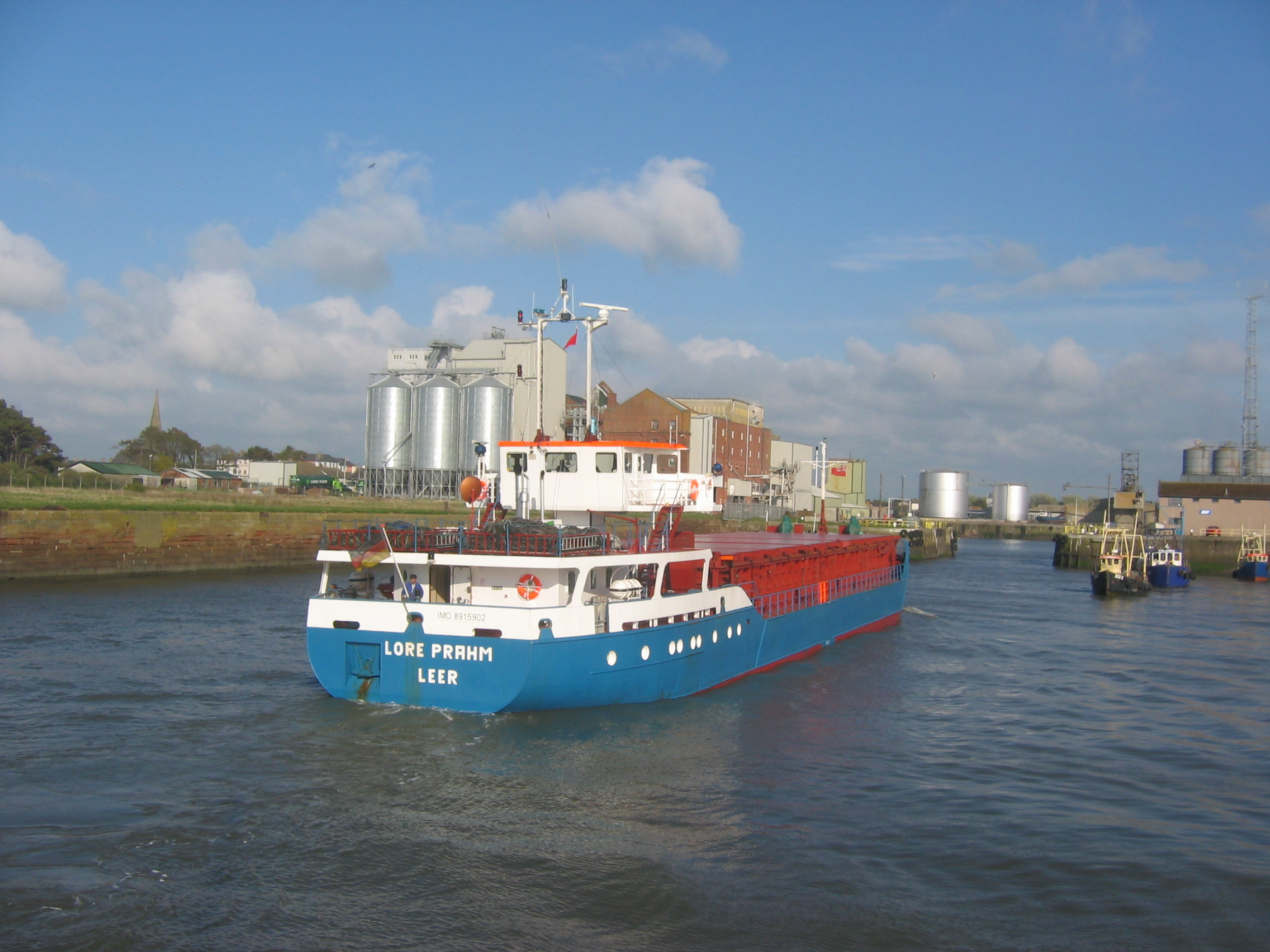
Silloth Port

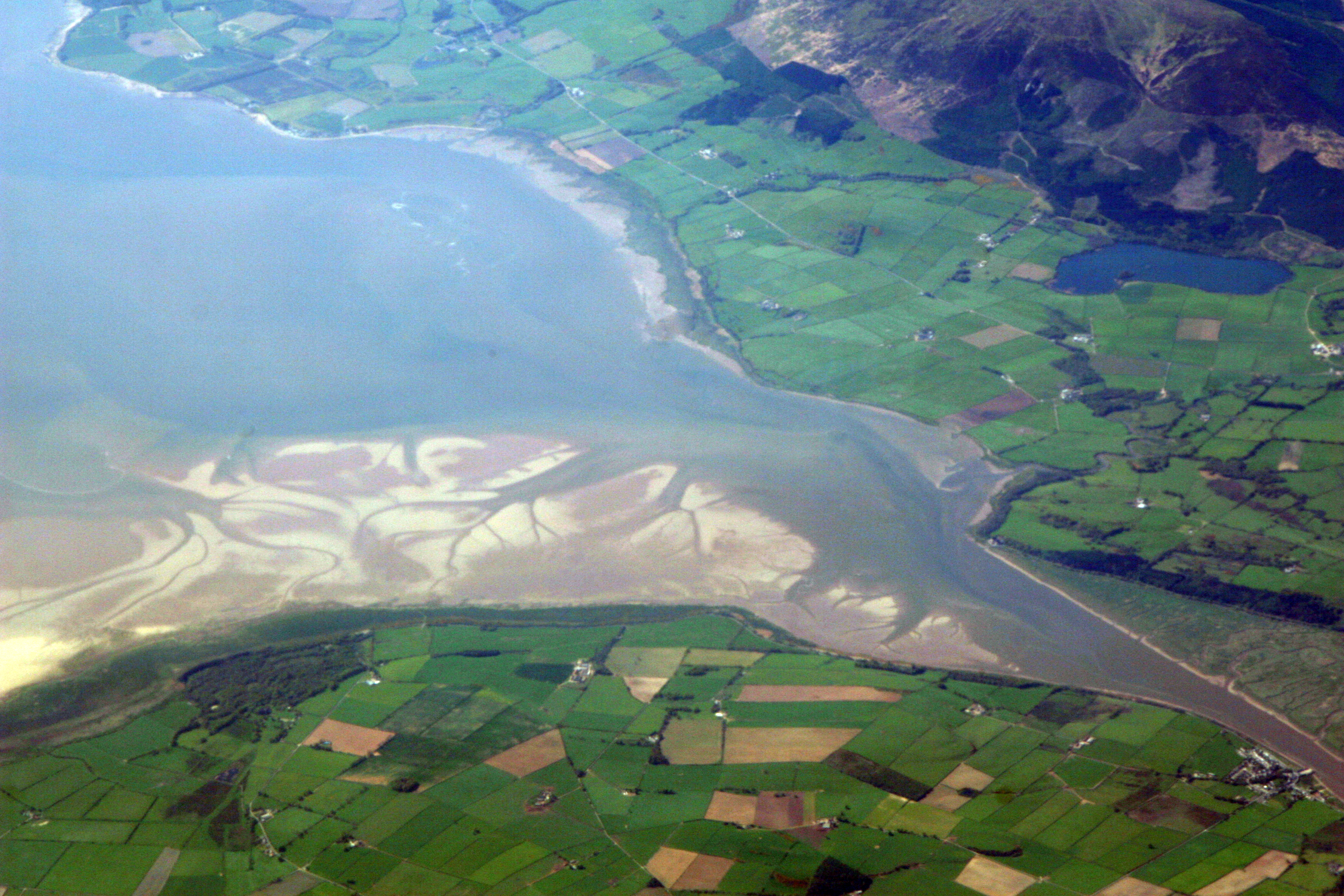
River Nith estuary

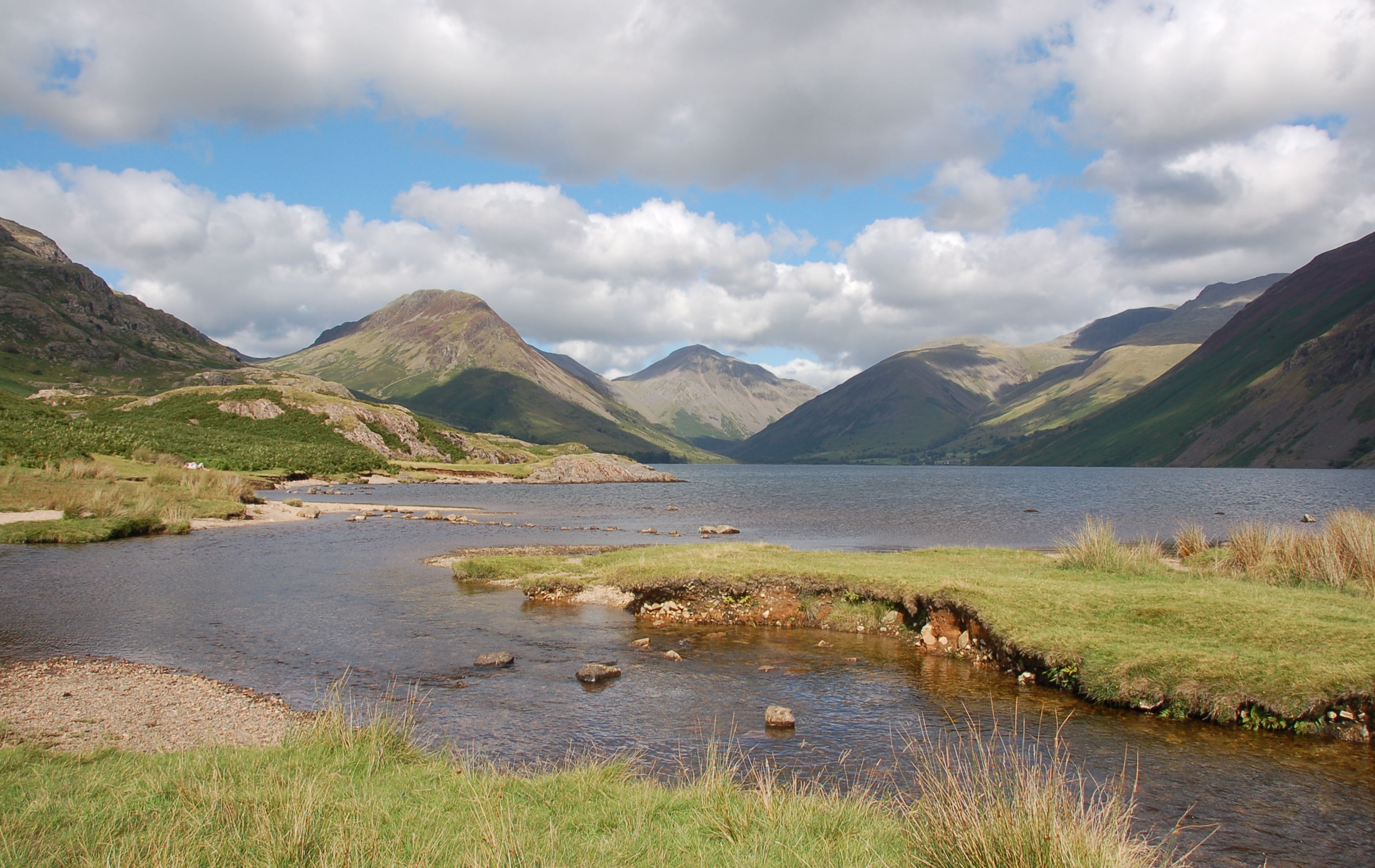
Wasdale from Wastwater

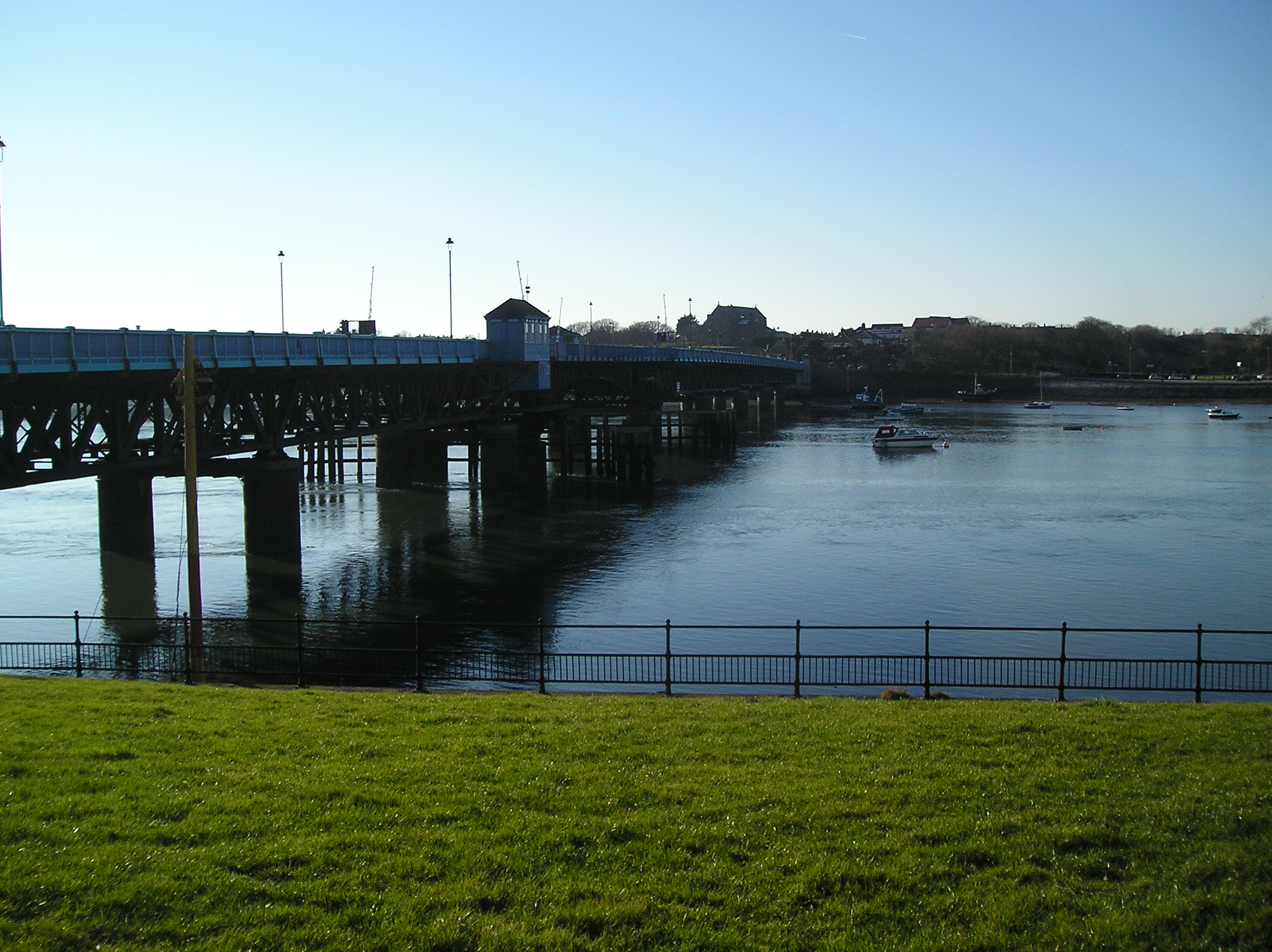
Walney Island

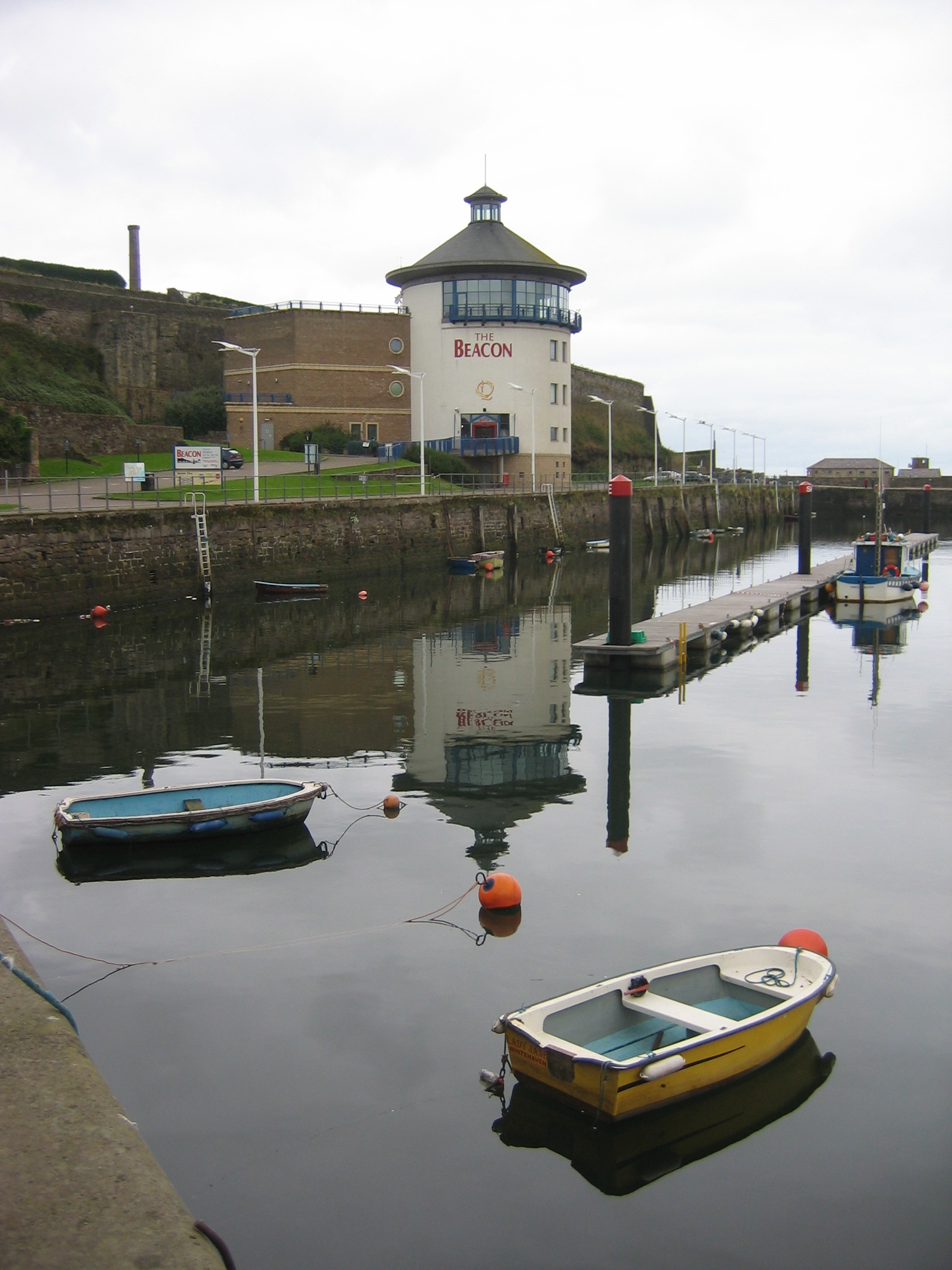
Whitehaven beacon

Whitehaven

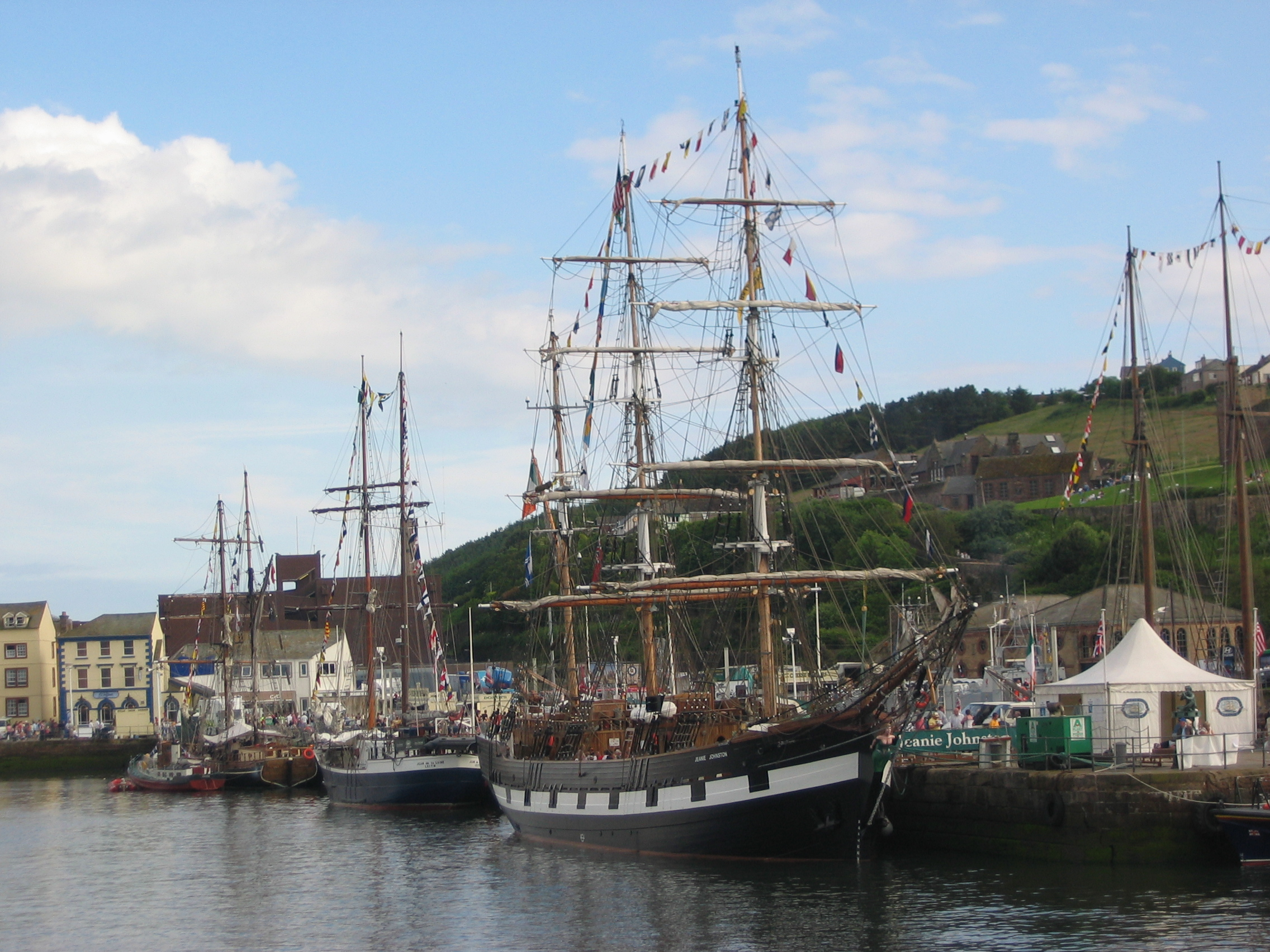
Whitehaven Maritime Festival 2005

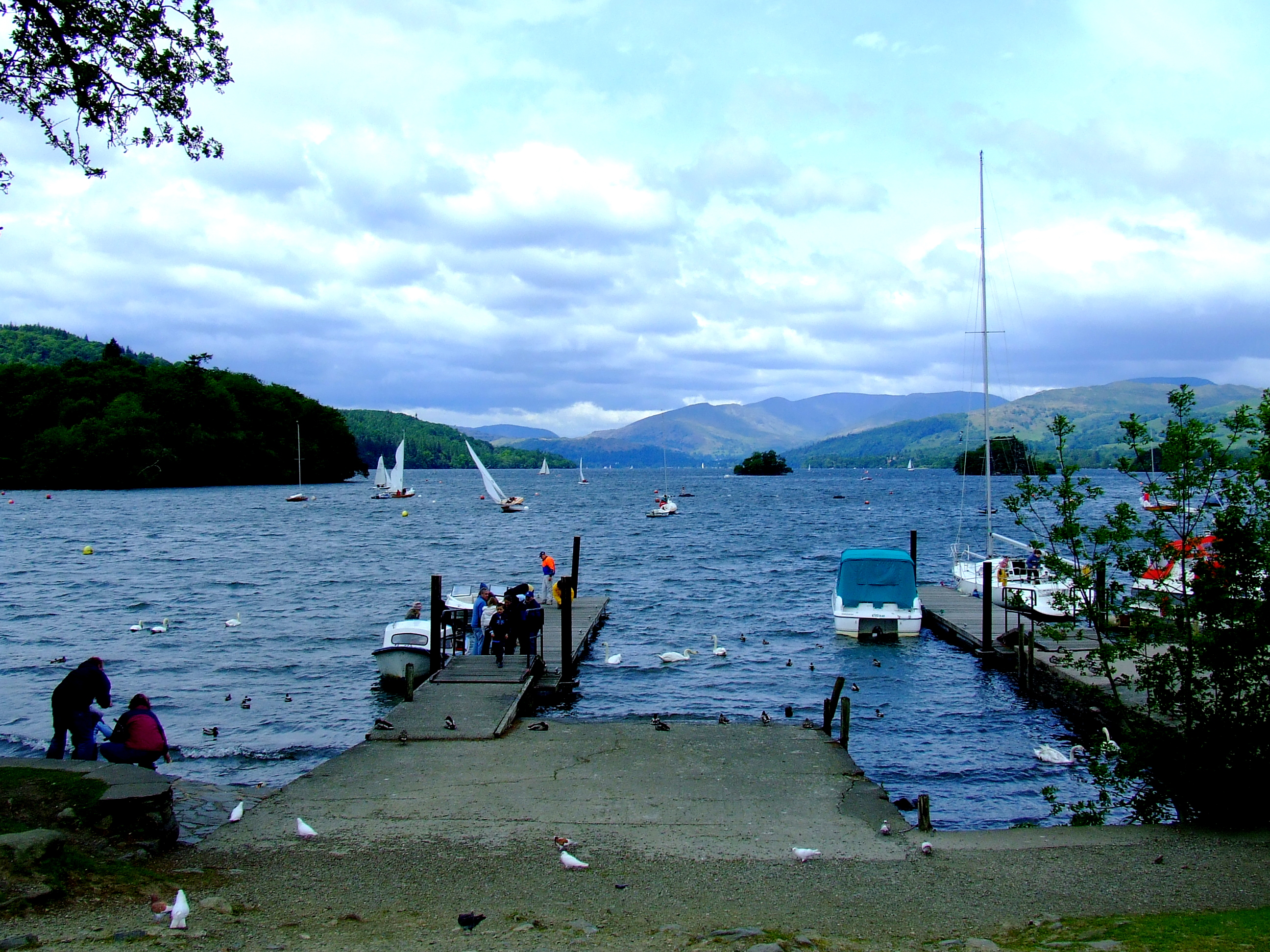
Windermere

== A ==
- Abbeytown, Ackenthwaite, Adgarley, Aglionby
- Aiketgate, Aikhead, Aikshaw, Aikton, Ainstable, Aisgill
- Albyfield, Aldingham, Aldoth, Allenwood
- Allhallows, Allithwaite, Allonby
- Alston, Alston Moor
- Ambleside
- Angerton, Cumberland, Angerton, Westmorland and Furness, Annaside, Anthorn
- Appleby-in-Westmorland, Applethwaite
- Arkleby, Arlecdon, Armaside, Armathwaite
- Arnaby, Arnside, Arrad Foot, Arthuret, Asby, Cumberland, Asby, Westmorland and Furness
- Ashgill, Askam-in-Furness, Askham, Askerton
- Aspatria, Aughertree, Ayside

== B ==
- Backbarrow, Baggrow, Baldwinholme, Bampton, Bampton Grange
- Bandrake Head, Banks, Barber Green, Barbon
- Barclose, Bardsea, Barepot, Barras
- Barrow Island, Barrow-in-Furness
- Barrows Green, Barton
- Bassenthwaite
- Baycliff, Bayles, Beanthwaite, Beaumont
- Beck Bottom, Beck Foot, Beck Head, Beck Side
- Beckces, Beckermet, Beckfoot, Beckside
- Beetham, Belah, Belle Vue, Berrier, Bewaldeth
- Bewcastle
- Biggar, Biglands, Bigrigg
- Birkby, Birkerthwaite
- Black Combe, Blackbeck, Blackdyke, Blackford
- Blackpool Gate, Blackwell
- Blagill, Blawith, Bleatarn, Blencarn, Blencogo, Blencow, Blennerhasset,
- Blindbothel, Blindcrake, Blitterlees
- Bolton, Bolton Low Houses, Bolton New Houses, Bolton Wood Lane, Boltongate,
- Bomby, Bonning Gate, Boot, Bootle
- Borrowdale, Borrowdale (Westmorland), Botcherby, Bothel, Boustead Hill
- Bouth, Bow, Bowland Bridge, Bowmanstead, Bowness-on-Solway
- Bowness-on-Windermere, Bowscale, Bowston, Brackenber, Brackenlands, Brackenthwaite (near Wigton), Brackenthwaite (near Cockermouth), Braithwaite
- Brampton (Carlisle), Brampton (Westmorland and Furness)
- Brandlingill, Bransty, Branthwaite
- Brathay, Braystones, Brayton Park, Bretherdale Head
- Bridekirk, Bridge Field, Bridgefoot, Briery
- Brigham, Brigsteer
- Brisco, Briscoe
- Broad Oak, Broadwath, Brockleymoor
- Bromfield, Broom, Brothybeck
- Brough, Brough Sowerby, Brougham
- Broughton, Broughton Beck, Broughton Cross
- Broughton East, Broughton-in-Furness, Broughton Mills
- Broughton Moor, Broughton West
- Brownber, Browtop, Brunstock, Brunthwaite
- Buckabank, Bullgill
- Burgh by Sands, Burneside, Burnrigg, Burrells, Burtholme
- Burthwaite, Burton-in-Kendal, Busk
- Buttermere, Butterwick

== C ==
- Caldbeck, Calder, Calder Bridge, Calthwaite, Calva (between Workington and Seaton), Calvo
- Cambeck Bridge, Camerton, Canal Foot
- Cardew, Cardewlees, Cardurnock, Cargo, Cark
- Carlatton, Carleton (north), Carleton (south), Carleton (east), Carr Bank
- Carlisle
- Cartmel, Cartmel Fell
- Carwinley, Casterton, Castle Carrock, Castle Sowerby, Castletown
- Cat Bank, Catlowdy, Catterlen, Causeway End
- Causewayhead, Cautley, Chalkfoot
- Chapel, Chapel Stile, Chapels, Chestnut Hill
- Church Brough, Claife, Clappersgate, Clawthorpe, Cleabarrow
- Cleator, Cleator Moor
- Cliburn, Clifton, Clifton Dykes, Cockermouth
- Cocklakes, Cockley Beck, Colby, Coldbeck
- Colthouse, Colton, Common End
- Coniston
- Corby Hill, Corkickle, Corney, Cotehill, Cotes, Cotehill, Coulderton
- Coupland, Cowen Head, Cowgill
- Crackenthorpe, Croasdale, Crofton, Croglin, Crook, Crooklands
- Crosby, Crosby Garrett, Crosby Ravensworth, Crosby Villa
- Croslands Park, Cross End, Crosscanonby, Crossgates
- Crosslands, Crosthwaite
- Culgaith, Cumdivock, Cummersdale, Cumrew, Cumwhinton, Cumwhitton, Currock

== D ==
- Dacre, Dale, Dalemain
- Dalston, Dalton, Dalton-in-Furness
- Dean, Deanscales, Dearham, Deepthwaite, Dendron, Dent, Denton Holme, Distington, Dockray
- Dovenby, Dragley Beck, Drigg, Drumburgh, Drumleaning, Drybeck
- Dubwath, Duddon Bridge, Dufton, Dundraw
- Dungeon Ghyll, Dunnerdale with Seathwaite, Durdar, Dykesfield

== E ==
- Eaglesfield, Eamont Bridge
- East Curthwaite, Easton, Edderside, Edenhall
- Egremont, Egton with Newland, Ellenborough
- Ellonby, Elterwater, Embleton, Endmoor
- Ennerdale Bridge
- Eskdale, Eskdale Green, Eskett, Etterby, Ewanrigg

== F ==
- Fair Hill, Far Arnside, Far End, Far Sawrey
- Farlam, Farleton, Faugh, Fawcett Forest, Fell Side, Fenton
- Field Broughton, Fingland, Finsthwaite, Firbank
- Flakebridge, Fletchertown, Flimby, Flitholme, Flookburgh, Floristonrigg
- Force Forge, Forest Head, Fornside, Fothergill
- Foulbridge, Foxfield, Frizington

== G ==
- Gaisgill, Galligill, Gamblesby, Gamelsby, Garlands
- Garnett Bridge, Garrigill, Garsdale, Garsdale Head
- Garth Row, Garths, Gatebeck, Gatefoot, Gatesgarth
- Gawthrop, Gawthwaite, Geltsdale, Gilcrux, The Gill, Gilsland
- Glasson, Glasson, Glassonby, Glassonbybeck
- Gleaston, Glencoyne, Glenridding, Goadsbarrow
- Goodyhills, Goose Green, Gosforth
- Grange Fell, Grange in Borrowdale, Grange-over-Sands
- Grasmere, Grassgarth, Grayrigg, Grayson Green
- Great Asby, Great Blencow, Great Broughton, Great Clifton
- Great Corby, Great Crosthwaite, Great Langdale, Great Musgrave, Great Ormside
- Great Orton, Great Salkeld, Great Strickland, Great Urswick
- Green Bank, Green Head
- Green Quarter, Greengill, Greenhill, Greenholme, Greenodd
- Greenrow, Greenwell, Greysouthen
- Greystoke, Greystone, Grinsdale, Grisedale, Grizebeck
- Grizedale, Grizedale Forest, Gullom Holme

== H ==
- Hackthorpe, Haile, Hailforth, Hale
- Halfpenny, Hall Dunnerdale, Hall Santon
- Hall Waberthwaite, Hallbankgate, Hallbeck, Hallow Bank
- Hallthwaites, Haltcliff Bridge
- Hampsfield, Hardendale, Haresceugh
- Harker, Harker Marsh, Harraby
- Harrington, Harriston, Hartley, Hartsop, Hassness
- Haverigg, Haverthwaite, Hawcoat, Hawksdale
- Hawkshead, Hawkshead Hill, Haws Bank, Hayton, Hayton, Hayton and Mealo
- Hazelrigg, Hazelslack, Heads Nook, Heaning
- Heathwaite, Heggle Lane, Helbeck, Helvellyn, Helsington, Helton, Hensingham
- Hesket, Hesket Newmarket, Hethersgill, Hetherside Heversham
- High Bankhill, High Bewaldeth, High Biggins, High Casterton
- High Crosby, High Cunsey, High Green, High Harrington, High Hesket
- High Hill, High Ireby, High Knipe, High Longthwaite
- High Lorton, High Newton, High Oaks, High Rigg
- High Row, High Scales, High Side, High Wray, Highbridge, Highlaws
- Highmoor, Hill Top, Hilton
- Hincaster, Hodbarrow, Hoff, Holborn Hill, Hollins
- Holker, Holme, Holme Abbey, Holme East Waver, Holme Low
- Holme St Cuthbert, Holmrook, Holmwrangle, Honister Pass
- Hopebeck, Hornsby, Houghton
- How, Howgate, Howgill, Howtown
- Hubbersty Head, Hugill, Hunsonby, Hurst
- Hutton, Hutton End, Hutton-in-the-Forest, Hutton John, Hutton Roof (Mungrisdale), Hutton Roof (Kirkby Lonsdale), Hutton Soil, Hycemoor, Hyton

== I-J ==
- Ings, Ireby, Ireleth, Irthington
- Isel, Isle of Walney, Ivegill, Johnby, Jericho

== K ==
- Kaber, Keekle, Keisley, Kelbarrow, Keld
- Kelleth, Kells, Kelsick, Kelton Head, Kendal
- Kentmere, Kentrigg, Kents Bank, Kershopefoot
- Keswick
- Killington, Kilnhill, Kingmoor, King's Meaburn
- Kingside Hill, Kingstown, Kingwater, Kinkry Hill
- Kirkandrews-on-Eden, Kirkbampton, Kirkbride
- Kirkby-in-Furness, Kirkby Lonsdale, Kirkby Stephen, Kirkby Thore, Kirkcambeck
- Kirkhouse, Kirkland (in Ennerdale), Kirkland (near Penrith), Kirkland Guards
- Kirklinton, Kirklinton Middle, Kirkoswald
- Kirksanton, Knock, Knowefield

== L ==
- Lady Hall, Laithes, Lakes
- Lakeside, Lambfoot, Lambrigg, Lamonby, Lamplugh
- Lane End, Lanercost, Langdale, Langrigg, Langwathby
- Laversdale, Lazonby, Leadgate, Leasgill, Leece
- Legburthwaite, Lessonhall, Levens
- Lindal-in-Furness, Lindale, Linethwaite, Linstock
- Little Asby, Little Bampton, Little Blencow, Little Broughton
- Little Clifton, Little Corby, Little Crosthwaite, Little Langdale
- Little Musgrave, Little Ormside, Little Orton, Little Salkeld
- Little Strickland, Little Town, Little Urswick, Littlebeck
- Lockhills, Long Marton, Longburgh, Longcroft
- Longdales, Longlands, Longpark
- Longsleddale, Longsowerby, Longthwaite, Longtown
- Low Crosby, Low Harker, Low Hesket, Low Lorton, Low Wood
- Lowca, Loweswater, Lowick, Lowther, Lupton

== M ==
- Mallerstang, Mansergh, Mansriggs, Martindale
- Maryport, Matterdale End, Maughanby, Maulds Meaburn, Mawbray
- Meal Bank, Mealsgate, Melkinthorpe, Melmerby, Metal Bridge
- Micklethwaite, Middleton, Midgeholme, Milburn, Millom, Milnthorpe
- Milton, Mockerkin, Monkhill, Moor Row, Moresby
- Morland, Morton (north), Morton (south)
- Mosedale, Mosser, Motherby
- Muncaster, Mungrisdale, Murton

== N ==
- Nateby, Natland, Near Sawrey, Nenthall, Nenthead, Nethertown, Nether Wasdale
- Newbiggin (Croglin), Newbiggin (Stainton), Newbiggin (Temple Sowerby), Newbiggin-on-Lune
- New Cowper, Newby, Newby Bridge, Newby East, Newby West
- New Hutton, Newland, Newlands, New Rent, Newton, Newton Arlosh
- Newton Reigny, Newton Rigg, Newtown (Holme St Cuthbert), Newtown (Irthington), North Dykes, North Scale, Nunclose

== O ==
- Oddendale, Old Hutton, Old Town, Ormside, Orthwaite, Orton, Osmotherley
- Oughterside, Oulton, Ousby, Outhgill, Oxen Park, Oxenholme

== P ==
- Papcastle, Park Broom, Parsonby, Parton, Patterdale
- Pennington, Penrith, Penruddock, Pelutho
- Petteril Green, Pica, Piel Island, Plumbland, Plumpton, Pokerbeck,
- Ponsonby, Pooley Bridge, Port Carlisle, Portinscale, Preston Patrick, Prospect

== Q ==
- Quality Corner

== R ==
- Rampside, Ravenglass, Ravenstonedale, Raughton Head, Renwick, Rickerby
- Roanhead, Rockcliffe, Rockcliffe Cross, Roose, Roosebeck
- Rosley, Rosside, Rosthwaite (north), Rosthwaite (south), Rottington
- Roundthwaite, Routenbeck, Rowrah, Ruckcroft, Ruleholme
- Rusland, Ruthwaite, Rydal

== S ==
- Sadgill, St Bees, Salkeld Dykes, Salta, Sandale, Sandford, Santon Bridge, Sandwith, Satterthwaite
- Scaleby, Scalebyhill, Scales (near Ulverston), Scales (near Threlkeld), Scotby
- Seascale, Seathwaite (in the Duddon Valley), Seathwaite (in Borrowdale)
- Seatoller, Seaton, Sebergham, Sedbergh, Sedgwick, Selside
- Sceughmire
- Shap, Shoregill
- Siddick, Silecroft, Silloth, Silverband
- Skelton, Skelwith Bridge, Skinburness, Skirwith, Skitby
- Slack Head
- Smardale, Smithfield
- Sockbridge, Soulby (near Dacre) Soulby (near Kirkby Stephen), Southwaite
- Spark Bridge
- Stainton (near Dacre), Stainton (near Kendal), Stainton with Adgarley
- Stair, Stanah, Stank, Stapleton, Staveley, Staveley-in-Cartmel
- Stockdalewath, Stone House, Storrs, Storth, Stub Place, Studholme
- Sunderland
- Swallowhurst, Swarthmoor, Swindale, Swinside

== T ==
- Tallentire, Talkin, Tarraby, Tarns
- Tebay, Temple Sowerby
- Thiefside, Thornhill, Thornthwaite (Keswick), Thornthwaite (Wigton), Threapland, Threlkeld, Thursby, Thurstonfield, Thurstonfield Lough, Thwaites
- Tirril
- Todhills, Torpenhow, Torver
- Troutbeck (near Penrith), Troutbeck (near Windermere), Troutbeck Bridge

== U ==
- Uldale, Ulpha, Ulverston, Underbarrow, Underskiddaw
- Unthank (near Dalston), Unthank (near Glassonby), Unthank End
- Upper Denton, Upton, Urswick

== V ==
- Vickerstown

== W ==
- Waberthwaite, Walton, Warcop, Warnell, Warwick Bridge, Warwick-on-Eden
- Wasdale, Wasdale Head, Watchgate, Watendlath, Watermillock, Wath Brow, Waverbridge, Waverton
- Welton, Wet Sleddale, Westnewton, Westward, Wetheral
- Whale, Whicham, Whitehaven
- Wiggonby, Wigton, Wilton
- Winder, Windermere, Winscales, Winster
- Winton, Witherslack, Wolsty, Woodend, Woodend
- Woodland, Workington, Wreay, Wythburn, Wythop Mill

== Y ==
- Yanwath, Yarlside, Yearngill, Yewdale

== See also ==
- List of places in England
