= Stainton =

Stainton can refer to:

== Places in England ==
- Cumbria
  - Stainton, Kingmoor
  - Stainton, Dacre, near Penrith
  - Stainton (near Kendal)
  - Stainton with Adgarley, near Dalton-in-Furness
- County Durham:
  - Stainton, County Durham, near Barnard Castle
  - Great Stainton
  - Little Stainton
- Lincolnshire:
  - Stainton by Langworth
  - Stainton le Vale
  - Market Stainton
- North Yorkshire:
  - Stainton, Middlesbrough
  - Stainton, west North Yorkshire, near Richmond
  - Staintondale
- South Yorkshire:
  - Stainton, South Yorkshire, in the City of Doncaster

== People ==
- Stainton (surname)

== Ships ==
- MV Stainton, a British coaster in service 1947-51
