= Bolton Wood Lane =

Hamlet in Cumbria, England

Coordinates: 54.786°N 3.159°W

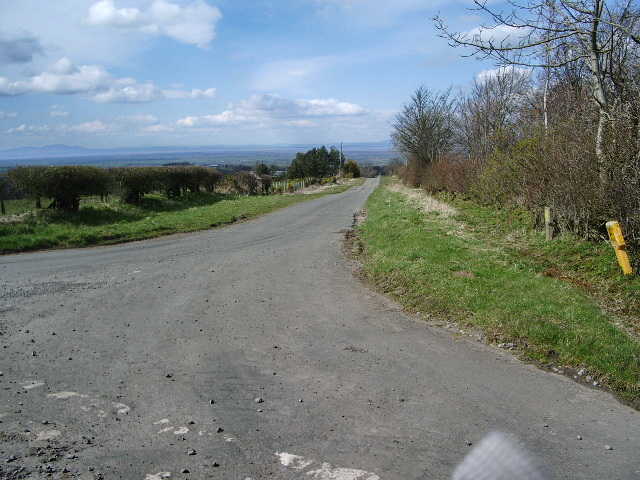
- Road to Bolton Wood Lane

- Location in Allerdale, Cumbria Location within Cumbria
- OS grid reference: NY254440
- Civil parish: Boltons
- Unitary authority: Cumberland
- Ceremonial county: Cumbria
- Region: North West
- Country: England
- Sovereign state: United Kingdom
- Post town: WIGTON
- Postcode district: CA7
- Dialling code: 016973
- Police: Cumbria
- Fire: Cumbria
- Ambulance: North West
- UK Parliament: Penrith and Solway

Bolton Wood Lane is a hamlet in Cumbria, England. It is located 3.1 miles (5.0 km) by road to the southwest of South End, to the east of Bolton Low Houses.

== See also ==
- List of places in Cumbria
