= Listed buildings in Kingmoor =

Kingmoor is a civil parish in the Cumberland district of Cumbria, England. It contains seven listed buildings that are recorded in the National Heritage List for England. All the listed buildings are designated at Grade II, the lowest of the three grades, which is applied to "buildings of national importance and special interest". The parish contains the villages of Stainton and Cargo, and is otherwise rural. The listed buildings consist of farmhouses, farm buildings, private houses, and a boathouse.

== Buildings ==
Name and location	Photograph	Date	Notes
West End Farmhouse and barn 54.92211°N 2.99462°W	—	Late 17th century	The farmhouse is in clay on a stone plinth and has a green slate roof. There are two storeys and two bays, with a cobble extension at the rear. The doorway has a plain surround, and the windows are sashes. The barn is at right angles, and is in clay with an extension in brick, a rear wall in cobble and rubble, and a Welsh slate roof. It contains a cart entrance, doorways and a blocked window.
Eden Farm; 54.92242°N 2.99361°W	—	1728	Originally a farmhouse, later a private house, it is in brick on a cobble plinth, and it has a Welsh slate roof. There are two storeys and two bays. The doorway has a plain surround, and a dated and inscribed lintel, and the windows are sashes in plain surrounds.
King Garth and stables 54.92911°N 3.00774°W	—	1733	Originally a bailiff's house, it was extended later in the 18th century, and has since been used as a boathouse. It is in brick with a roof of sandstone slabs repaired with Welsh slate, and with green slate on the extensions. There are two storeys and two bays, with a one-bay extension to the right and a two-bay stable to the left. On the front is a porch, a doorway with a plain sandstone surround, and sash windows. On the building are inscribed stone panels. External steps lead up to a loft door in the stable.
Croft House; 54.92468°N 2.98848°W	—	Early 19th century	A brick house on a chamfered stone plinth with a Welsh slate roof. There are two storeys and three bays. The doorway has a segmental head, a fanlight, and a pilaster strip surround, and the windows have flat brick arches and stone sills.
The Hollies; 54.92299°N 2.99170°W	—	Early 19th century	A brick house with quoins and a slate roof. There are two storeys and three bays. The doorway has a radial segment-headed fanlight, and a pilastered surround with a moulded arch and a keystone. The windows are sashes with flat arches and keystones.
Waverley House and barn 54.90256°N 2.96675°W	—	Early 19th century	The farmhouse and barn are in brick with pale headers, partly rendered, the right side wall is slate-hung, and there is a green slate roof. There are two storeys, three bays, and a lower two-storey barn. The doorway has a patterned fanlight with a segment-headed surround and a false keystone, and the windows are sashes with flat brick arches.
Eden View; 54.90266°N 2.96772°W	—	1833	A brick farmhouse on a moulded stone plinth with slate-hung side walls. The house has quoins, a slate roof, two storeys and three bays. The door has a patterned fanlight with pilaster strips and a moulded architrave, and the windows are sashes with flat brick arches. The lintel is inscribed with the date and initials.
