= Birkby =

Birkby may refer to the following places in England:

- Birkby, Cumbria
- Birkby, North Yorkshire
- Birkby, Huddersfield, West Yorkshire
