= Broad Oak =

Broad Oak or Broadoak may refer to one of several places in Great Britain or the United States:

England

- Broadoak, Cornwall, England
- Broad Oak, Cumbria, England
- Broad Oak, Rother, East Sussex, England
- Broad Oak, Wealden, East Sussex, England
- Broad Oak, Kent, England
- Broad Oak, Herefordshire, England
- Broad Oak, St Helens, England

United States

- Broad Oak (Dedham), an estate in Dedham, Massachusetts

== Other ==
- Hatfield Broad Oak, England
- Broad Oak Works, manufacturing division of BAE Systems Maritime – Maritime Services, Portsmouth, England
- Broadoak Academy, Somerset, England
- Broadoak School, Greater Manchester, England
- The Edward Harden Mansion in Sleepy Hollow, New York, United States, was originally known as Broad Oaks
- Broad Oak and Thornhill Meadows
