= Brockleymoor =

Settlement in Cumbria, England

Coordinates: 54.724°N 2.796°W

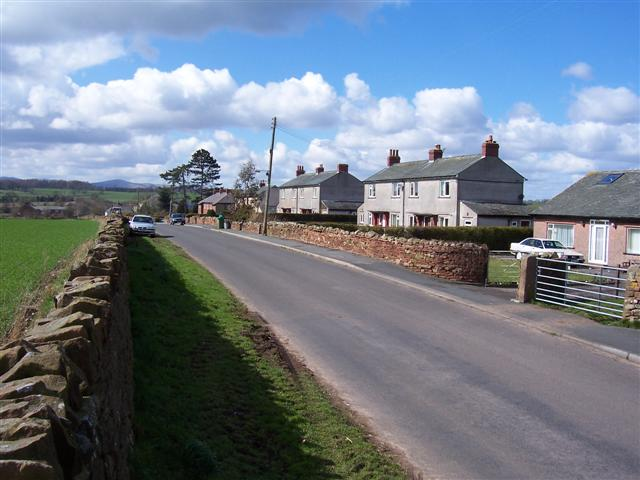
- Brockleymoor

- Location in Eden, Cumbria Location within Cumbria
- OS grid reference: NY487368
- Civil parish: Hesket
- Unitary authority: Westmorland and Furness
- Ceremonial county: Cumbria
- Region: North West
- Country: England
- Sovereign state: United Kingdom
- Post town: PENRITH
- Postcode district: CA11
- Dialling code: 01768
- Police: Cumbria
- Fire: Cumbria
- Ambulance: North West
- UK Parliament: Penrith and Solway

Brockleymoor was a hamlet in Cumbria, England, but it is now part of the village of Plumpton. It is located several miles north of Penrith, not far from the M6 motorway.

== See also ==
- List of places in Cumbria
