= Briscoe, Cumbria =

Hamlet in Cumbria, England

Coordinates: 54.489°N 3.509°W

Briscoe
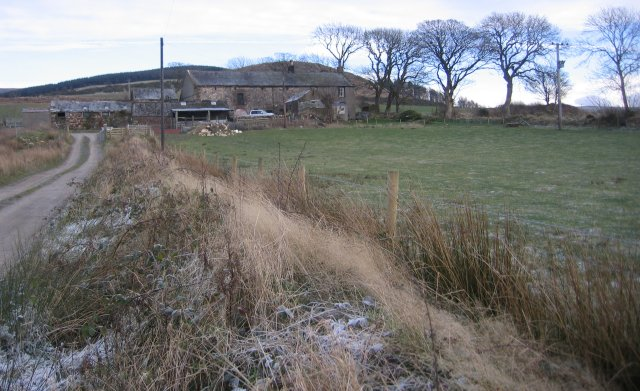
- Cobra Castle, Briscoe

- Location in Copeland Borough Location within Cumbria
- OS grid reference: NY022114
- Civil parish: St John Beckermet
- Unitary authority: Cumberland
- Ceremonial county: Cumbria
- Region: North West
- Country: England
- Sovereign state: United Kingdom
- Post town: EGREMONT
- Postcode district: CA22
- Dialling code: 01946
- Police: Cumbria
- Fire: Cumbria
- Ambulance: North West
- UK Parliament: Whitehaven and Workington

Briscoe is a hamlet in Cumbria, England. It is located to the east of Egremont.

== See also ==
- List of places in Cumbria
