= Blackbeck =

Village in Cumbria, England

Coordinates: 54.447325°N 3.495857°W

- Village
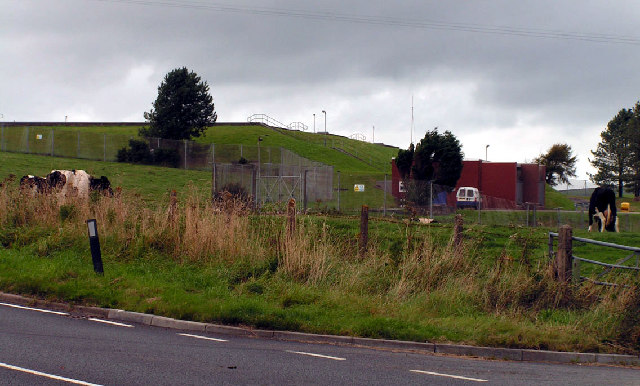
- Reservoir above Blackbeck

- Location in the former Copeland Borough Location within Cumbria
- OS grid reference: NY030068
- Civil parish: Beckermet
- Unitary authority: Cumberland
- Ceremonial county: Cumbria
- Region: North West
- Country: England
- Sovereign state: United Kingdom
- Post town: EGREMONT
- Postcode district: CA22
- Dialling code: 01946
- Police: Cumbria
- Fire: Cumbria
- Ambulance: North West
- UK Parliament: Whitehaven and Workington

Blackbeck is a small village in Cumbria, England. It is northeast of Beckermet and Sellafield, along the A595 road. It contains properties such as the Blackbeck Inn, Blackbeck Farm and Brow House.

== See also ==
- List of places in Cumbria
