= Bonning Gate =

Hamlet in Cumbria, England

Coordinates: 54.349°N 2.802°W

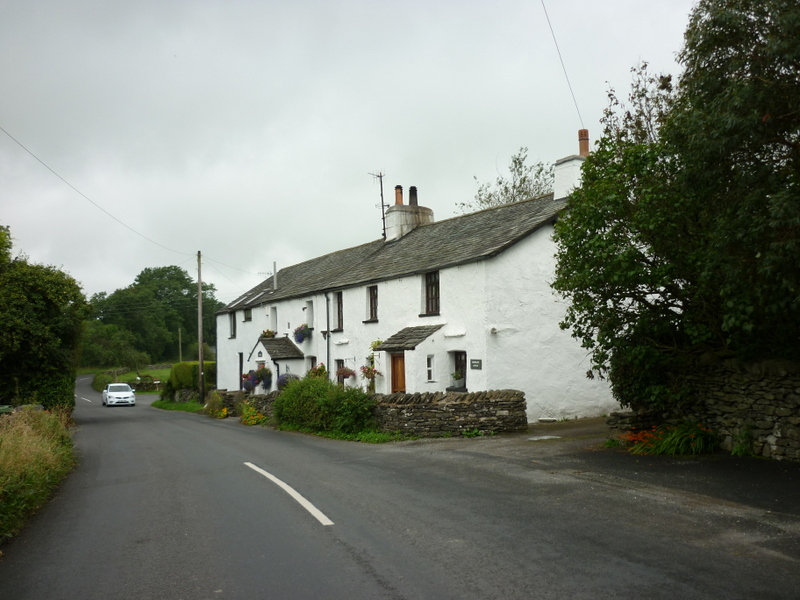
- Cottages at Bonning Gate

- Location in South Lakeland Location within Cumbria
- OS grid reference: SD478951
- Civil parish: Strickland Ketel
- Unitary authority: Westmorland and Furness
- Ceremonial county: Cumbria
- Region: North West
- Country: England
- Sovereign state: United Kingdom
- Post town: KENDAL
- Postcode district: LA8
- Dialling code: 01539
- Police: Cumbria
- Fire: Cumbria
- Ambulance: North West
- UK Parliament: Westmorland and Lonsdale

Bonning Gate is a hamlet in Cumbria, England. It is located 3.2 miles (5.1 km) by road to the northwest of Kendal.

== See also ==
- List of places in Cumbria
