= Busk, Cumbria =

Hamlet in Cumbria, England

Coordinates: 54.772°N 2.608°W

Busk
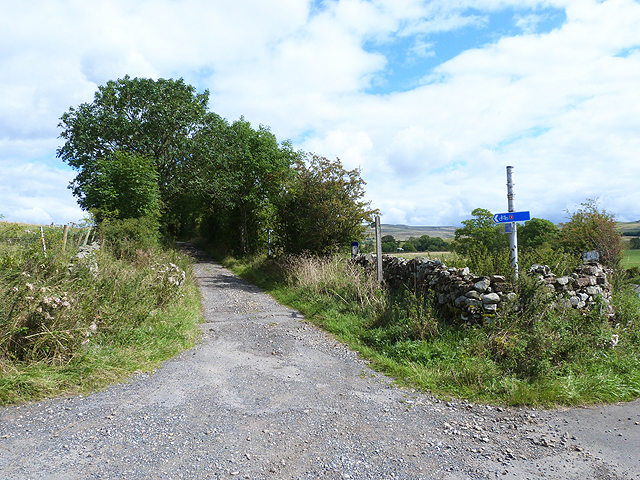
- Off-road cycle route at Five Lane Ends, near Busk

- Location in Eden, Cumbria Location within Cumbria
- OS grid reference: NY608420
- Civil parish: Kirkoswald
- Unitary authority: Westmorland and Furness
- Ceremonial county: Cumbria
- Region: North West
- Country: England
- Sovereign state: United Kingdom
- Post town: PENRITH
- Postcode district: CA10
- Dialling code: 01768
- Police: Cumbria
- Fire: Cumbria
- Ambulance: North West
- UK Parliament: Penrith and Solway

Busk is a hamlet in Cumbria, England. It is located 3.7 miles (6.0 km) by road to the east of Kirkoswald.

== See also ==
- List of places in Cumbria
