= Armaside =

Village in Cumbria, England

Coordinates: 54.636°N 3.315°W

- Location in Allerdale, Cumbria Location within Cumbria
- OS grid reference: NY151275
- Civil parish: Lorton
- Unitary authority: Cumberland
- Ceremonial county: Cumbria
- Region: North West
- Country: England
- Sovereign state: United Kingdom
- Post town: COCKERMOUTH
- Postcode district: CA13
- Dialling code: 019008
- Police: Cumbria
- Fire: Cumbria
- Ambulance: North West
- UK Parliament: Penrith and Solway

Armaside is an agricultural village in Cumbria, England, situated north of Low Lorton, south west of the River Cocker, and south east from Cockermouth. The village consists of Armaside, Armaside Farm, Armaside Howe, and High Armaside.

A map dated 1774 identifies the settlement as Armiside, whilst another dated 1820 shows it as Armside. Published in 1868, The National Gazetteer of Great Britain and Ireland notes that the people of Lorton including the hamlet of Armaside "are employed in flax-dressing, and in the manufacture of thread".

== See also ==
- List of places in Cumbria
