= Burnrigg =

Hamlet in Cumbria, England

Coordinates: 54.892°N 2.813°W

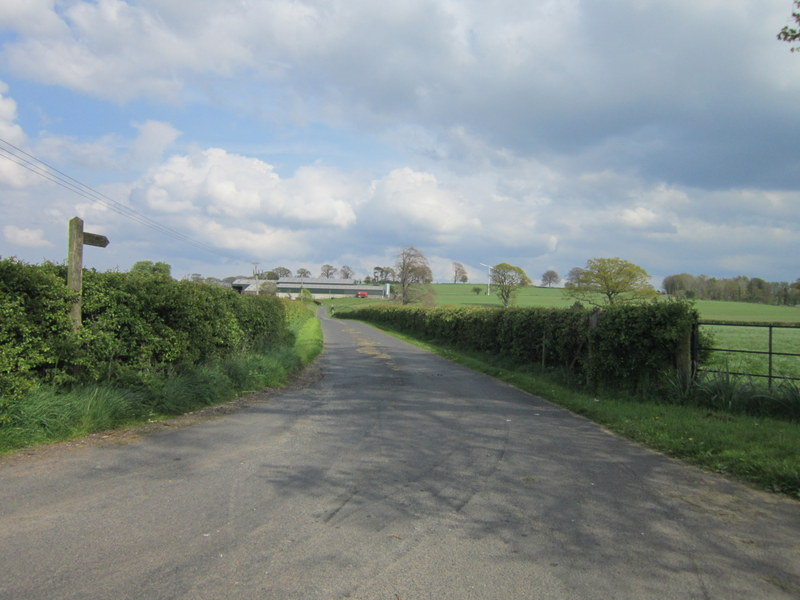
- A path leading to Low Wood Farm and Burnrigg

- Location in the former Carlisle district, Cumbria Location within Cumbria
- OS grid reference: NY478555
- Civil parish: Wetheral
- Unitary authority: Cumberland
- Ceremonial county: Cumbria
- Region: North West
- Country: England
- Sovereign state: United Kingdom
- Post town: CARLISLE
- Postcode district: CA8
- Dialling code: 01228
- Police: Cumbria
- Fire: Cumbria
- Ambulance: North West
- UK Parliament: Carlisle

Burnrigg is a hamlet in Cumbria, England. It is located to the east of Carlisle. In 1887, The British Architect said "on a site particularly high and open, are two small two- storied blocks of tenements, in all thirty-two, two small rooms to each, no other accommodation except four privies".

== See also ==
- List of places in Cumbria
