= Bleatarn =

Hamlet in Cumbria, England

Coordinates: 54.519°N 2.414°W

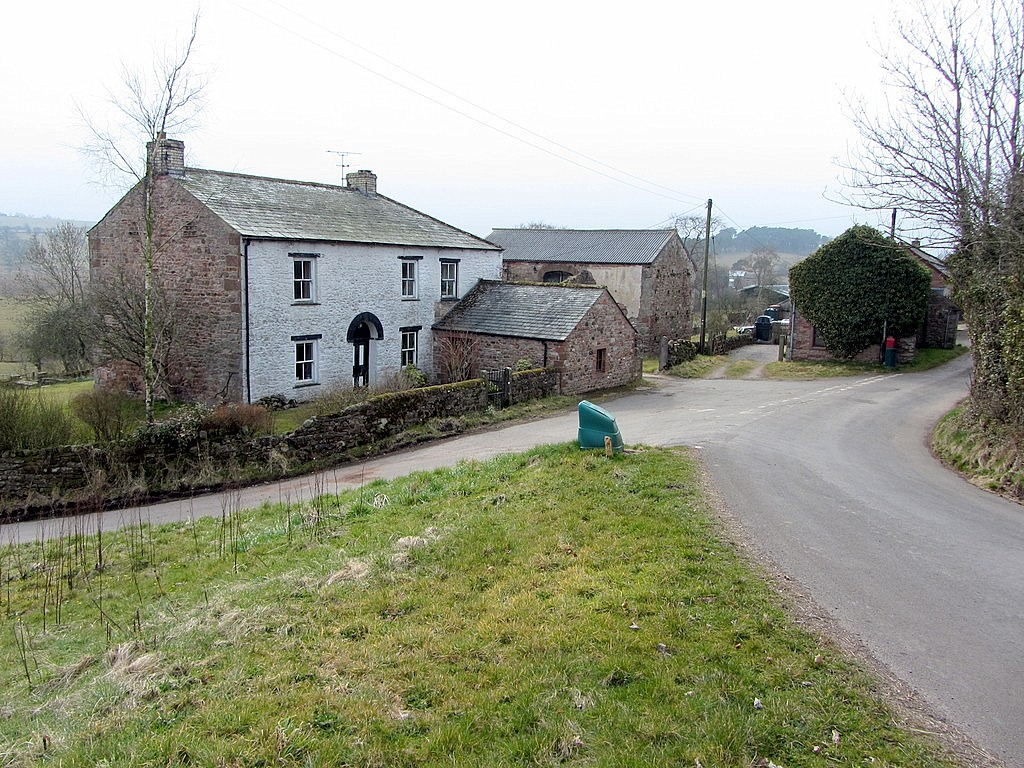
- Bleatarn

- Location in Eden, Cumbria Location within Cumbria
- OS grid reference: NY732138
- Civil parish: Warcop
- Unitary authority: Westmorland and Furness
- Ceremonial county: Cumbria
- Region: North West
- Country: England
- Sovereign state: United Kingdom
- Post town: APPLEBY-IN-WESTMORLAND
- Postcode district: CA16
- Dialling code: 017683
- Police: Cumbria
- Fire: Cumbria
- Ambulance: North West
- UK Parliament: Westmorland and Lonsdale

Bleatarn is a hamlet in Cumbria, England. It is located 3.3 miles (5.3 km) by road to the northwest of Soulby.

== See also ==
- List of places in Cumbria
