= Bolton New Houses =

Hamlet in Cumbria, England

Coordinates: 54.784°N 3.170°W

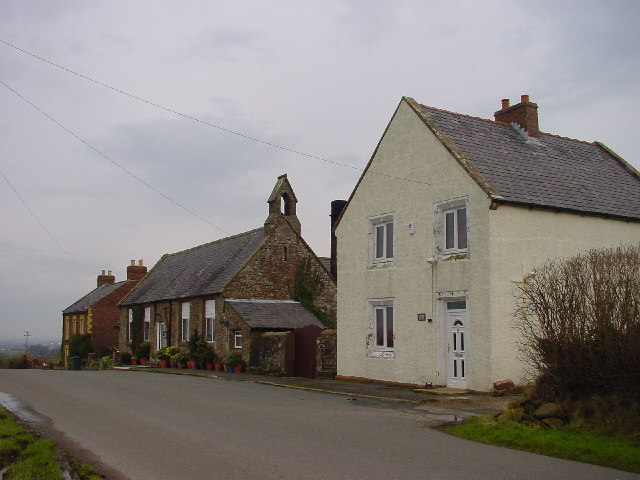
- Old School and School House, Bolton New Houses

- Location in Allerdale, Cumbria Location within Cumbria
- OS grid reference: NY247438
- Civil parish: Boltons
- Unitary authority: Cumberland
- Ceremonial county: Cumbria
- Region: North West
- Country: England
- Sovereign state: United Kingdom
- Post town: WIGTON
- Postcode district: CA7
- Dialling code: 016973
- Police: Cumbria
- Fire: Cumbria
- Ambulance: North West
- UK Parliament: Penrith and Solway

Bolton New Houses is a hamlet in Cumbria, England. Historically a part of Cumberland, it is located 3.1 miles (5.0 km) by the road to the southwest of South End.

== See also ==
- List of places in Cumbria
- Bolton Low Houses
