= Canal Foot =

Industrial village in Cumbria, England

Coordinates: 54.190°N 3.054°W

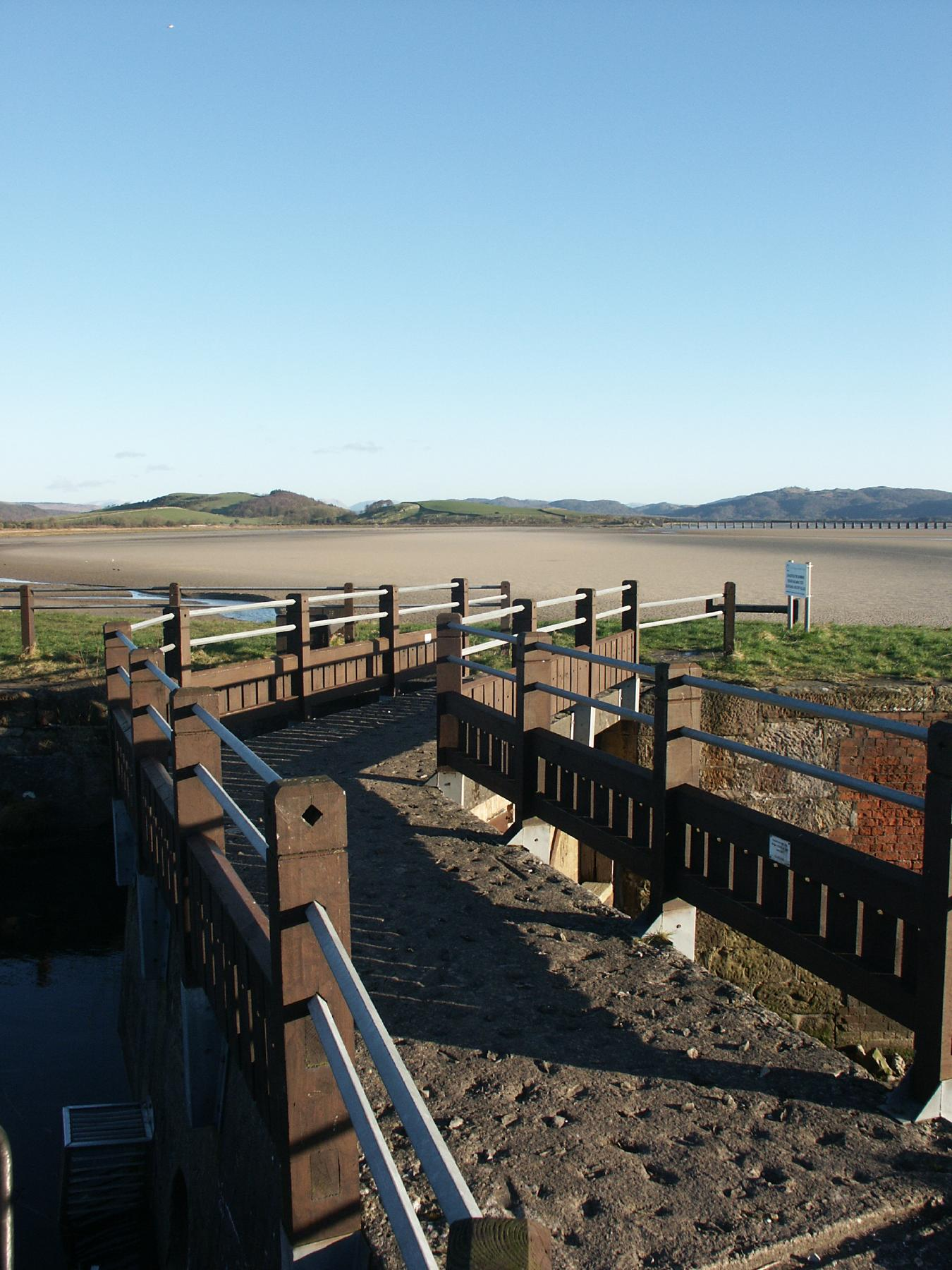
- Bridge at Canal Foot

- Location in South Lakeland Location on Morecambe Bay Location within Cumbria
- OS grid reference: SD314765
- Civil parish: Ulverston
- Unitary authority: Westmorland and Furness
- Ceremonial county: Cumbria
- Region: North West
- Country: England
- Sovereign state: United Kingdom
- Post town: ULVERSTON
- Postcode district: LA12
- Dialling code: 01229
- Police: Cumbria
- Fire: Cumbria
- Ambulance: North West
- UK Parliament: Barrow and Furness

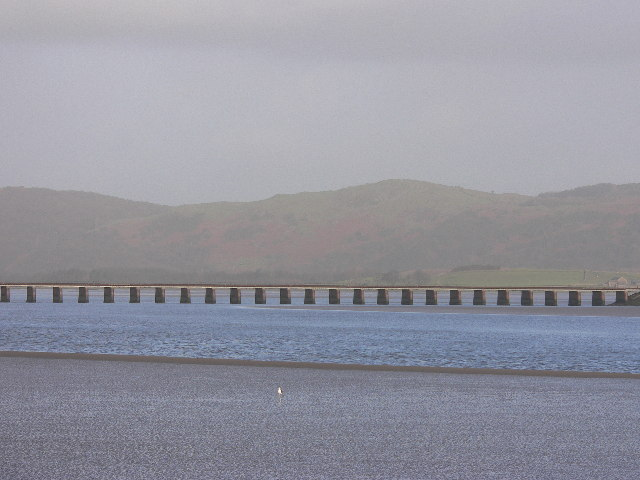
Levens Viaduct from Canal Foot

Canal Foot is an industrial village in Cumbria, England, on the Leven estuary. It is located 1.7 miles (2.7 km) by road to the east of the centre of Ulverston. Its name comes from its location being where the Ulverston Canal meets the Estuary.

Canal Foot is best known for its massive GlaxoSmithKline Plant, located in the former North Lonsdale Ironworks which ceased production in 1938. Glaxo Smith bought the plant in 1947 and manufactures penicillin and streptomycin and other medicines. Also of note is the Bay Horse Hotel and Restaurant, which was a staging post for coaches crossing Morecambe Bay during the 18th century. It serves traditional Cumbrian cuisine. It has won several awards, including being named "Cumbrian Inn of the Year" by The Good Hotel Guide in 2008 and "Lake District Hotel of the Year" by Lake District and Lancashire Life in 2000. The point here is called Hammerside Point. Canal Foot is used by anglers, as the water nearby contains a good amount of flounders and some sea bass.

== See also ==
- List of places in Cumbria
