= Boltons =

Civil parish in Cumbria, England

Coordinates: 54.755°N 3.164°W

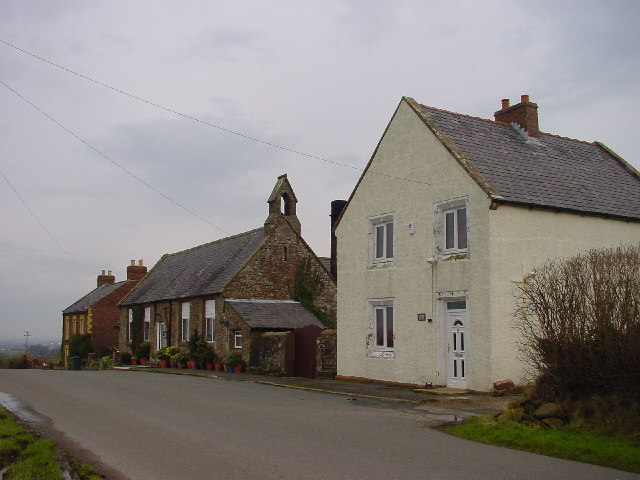
- Old School and School House, Bolton New Houses

- Location within Cumbria
- Population: 627 (2011 census)
- Civil parish: Boltons
- Unitary authority: Cumberland
- Ceremonial county: Cumbria
- Region: North West
- Country: England
- Sovereign state: United Kingdom
- UK Parliament: Penrith and Solway

Boltons is a civil parish in the Cumberland district, in the ceremonial county of Cumbria, England. According to the 2001 census it had a population of 585, increasing to 629 at the 2011 Census. Settlements in the parish include Bolton Low Houses, Bolton New Houses, Mealsgate, Boltongate and Sandale.

== Governance ==
An electoral ward in the same name exists. This ward stretches south to Underskiddaw with a total population of 1,832 as at the 2011 Census.

== See also ==
- Listed buildings in Boltons
