= Birkby, Cumbria =

Hamlet in Cumbria, England

Coordinates: 54.732°N 3.438°W

Birkby
- Location in Allerdale, Cumbria Location within Cumbria
- OS grid reference: NY074384
- Civil parish: Crosscanonby
- Unitary authority: Cumberland
- Ceremonial county: Cumbria
- Region: North West
- Country: England
- Sovereign state: United Kingdom
- Post town: MARYPORT
- Postcode district: CA15
- Dialling code: 01900
- Police: Cumbria
- Fire: Cumbria
- Ambulance: North West
- UK Parliament: Penrith and Solway

Birkby is a hamlet in the Cumberland district of the English county of Cumbria, historically within Cumberland, near the Lake District National Park. It is located on the A596 road, 1.6 miles (2.6 km) north-east of Maryport + 26.2 miles (42.2 km) south-west of Carlisle. In 1870-72 it had a population of 157.

== Governance ==
Birkby is in the parliamentary constituency of Penrith and Solway.

For Local Government purposes it is in the Cumberland unitary authority area.

Birkby is in the parish of Crosscanonby which has its own Parish Council; Crosscanonby Parish Council.

== See also ==
- List of places in Cumbria
