= Fornside =

Hamlet in Cumbria, England

Coordinates: 54.575°N 3.053°W

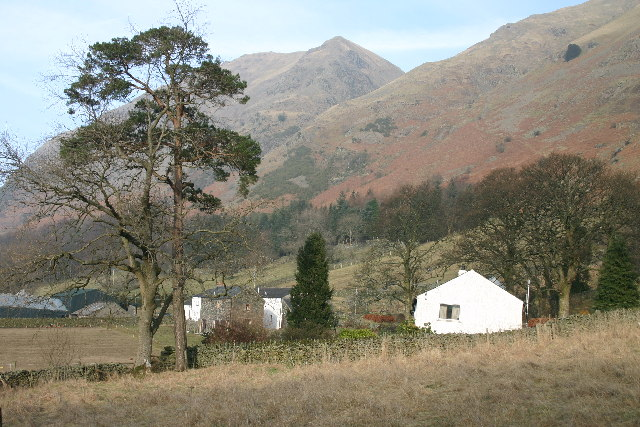
- Fornside

- Location in Allerdale, Cumbria Location within Cumbria
- OS grid reference: NY319204
- Civil parish: St John's Castlerigg and Wythburn
- Unitary authority: Cumberland
- Ceremonial county: Cumbria
- Region: North West
- Country: England
- Sovereign state: United Kingdom
- Post town: KESWICK
- Postcode district: CA12
- Dialling code: 017687
- Police: Cumbria
- Fire: Cumbria
- Ambulance: North West
- UK Parliament: Penrith and Solway

Fornside, part of an area known as St John's in the Vale, is a hamlet in the Lake District National Park of Cumbria, England. It is located about 4 miles as the crow flies to the southeast of Keswick, along the B5322 road.

The name is believed to be of Scandinavian origin, Forn meaning "old" or "former". The hamlet contains little more than self-catering cottages belonging to Fornside Farm, and 'The Studio', the former house of an artist which was "originally a barn adjoining Fornside House and is about 250 years old". There is also an old green Residential Carriage at Fornside, despite there being no nearby railway. The farmer owners Robert and Pam Hall rear Herdwick sheep. On the western side is the Sosgill and Righause woods.

Fornside is mentioned in Hall Caine's novel The Shadow of a Crime and visited by the character of Rotha.

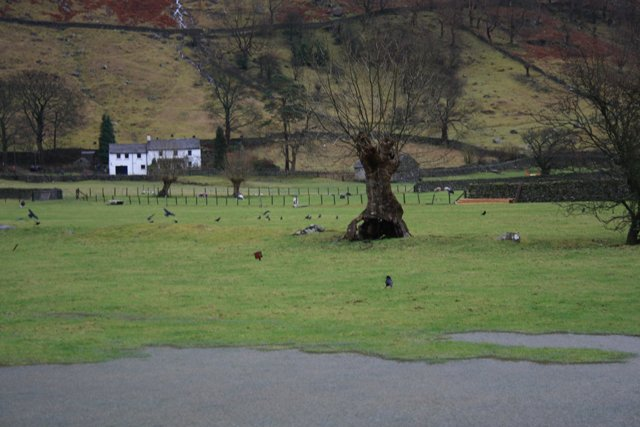
Fields of Fornside Pasture

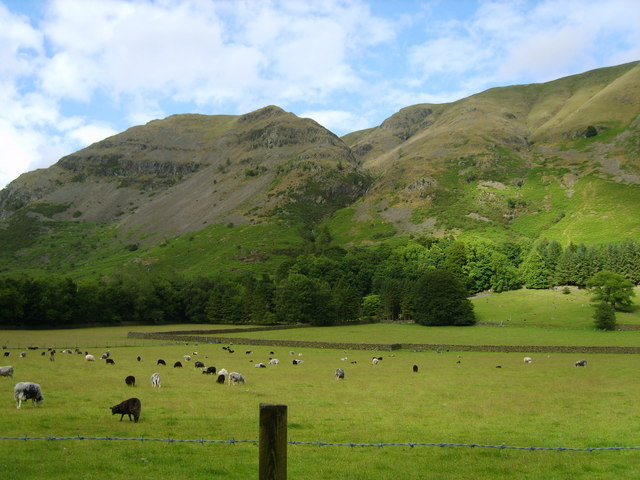
Herdwick sheep

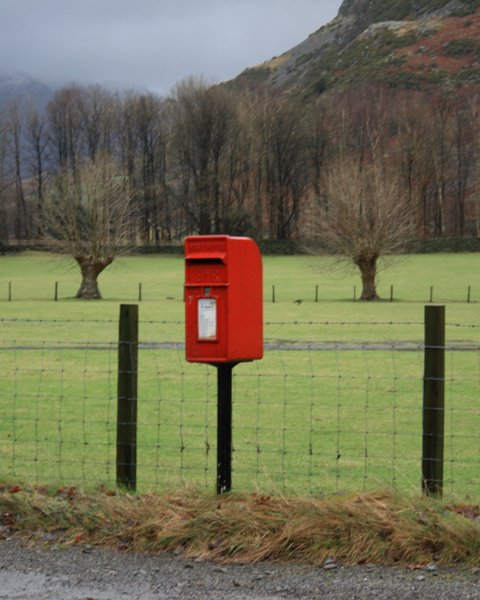
Post box

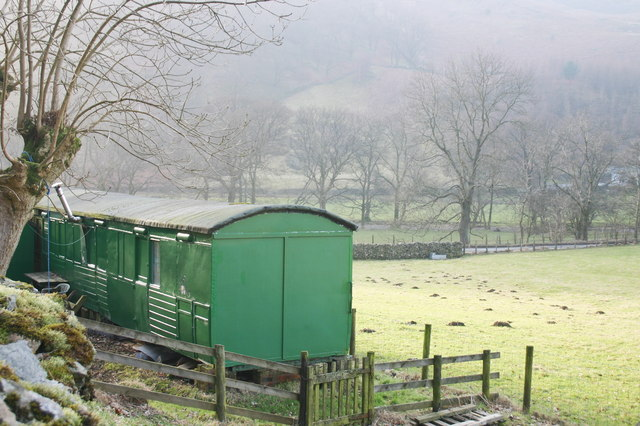
Residential carriage
