= Cautley =

Cautley is a surname. Notable people with the surname include:

- Baron Cautley of Lindfield in the County of Sussex, a title in the Peerage of the United Kingdom;
- Henry Cautley, 1st Baron Cautley (1863–1946), British barrister, judge and Conservative politician;
- Marjorie Sewell Cautley (1891–1954), American landscape architect;
- Proby Cautley KCB (1802–1871), English engineer and palaeontologist;
- Thomas Cautley Newby (1797–1882), English publisher and printer based in London;
- William Cautley (died 1864), New Zealand politician;

== See also ==
- Cautley Spout, England's highest waterfall above ground
