= Green Quarter =

Area of Manchester, England

Coordinates: 53.490°N 2.239°W

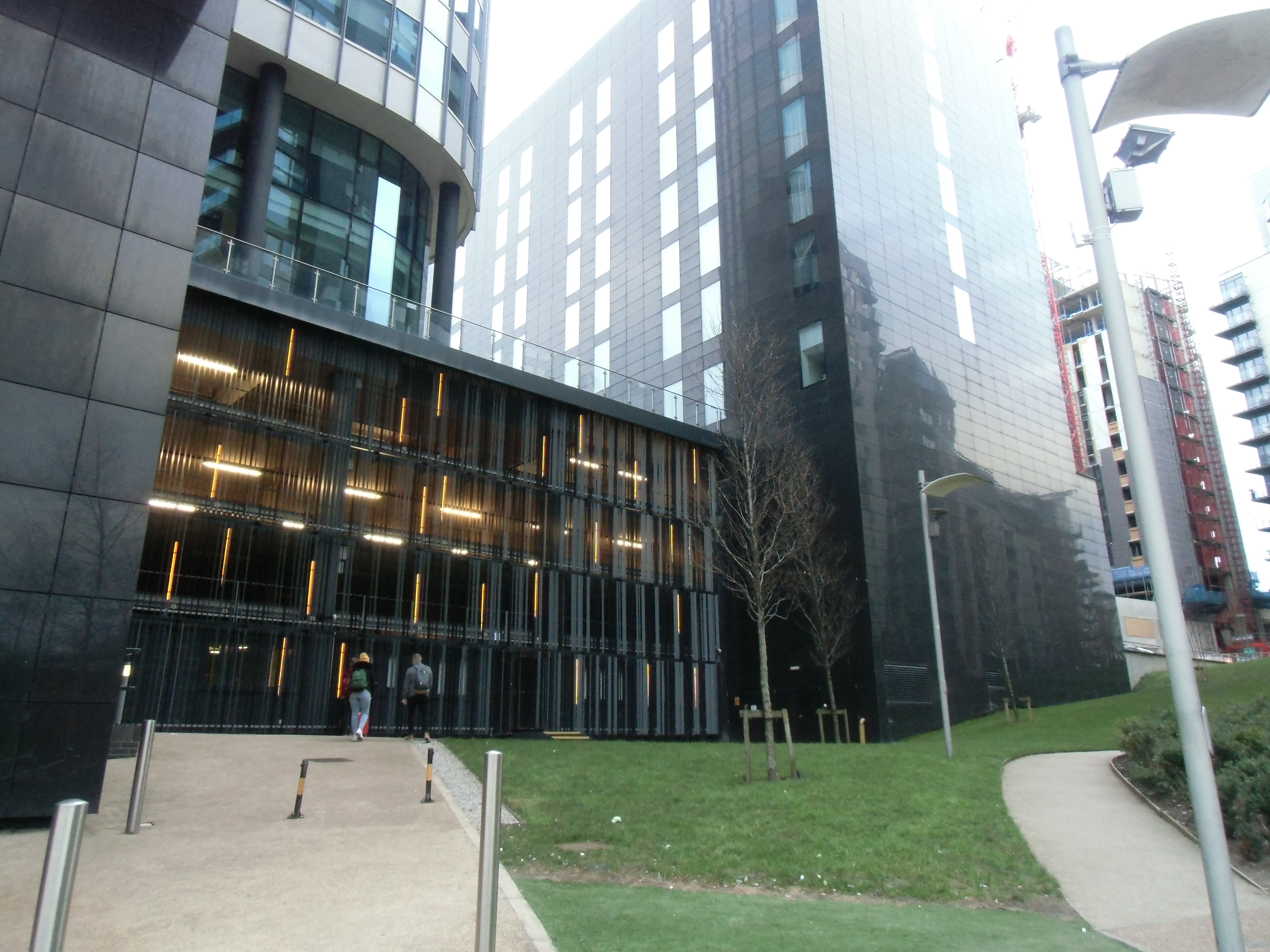
Manchester's Green Quarter

The Green Quarter is an area of Manchester, England, just north of the city centre between Cheetham, Strangeways and the River Irk.

From the mid-nineteenth century, the area, then known as Red Bank, was a slum housing impoverished Jewish immigrants from Eastern Europe, but is now home to digital start-ups and e-commerce businesses, new apartments, microbreweries, gin distilleries and restaurants.

Manchester's Green Quarter is a relatively new district built on the northern edge of the City Centre. It comprises a series of large new building developments near Manchester Victoria rail station. The Green Quarter is home to the £800m NOMA (North Manchester) development and One Angel Square, one of the most sustainable office buildings in Europe.
