= Drumleaning =

Hamlet in Cumbria, England

Coordinates: 54.856°N 3.136°W

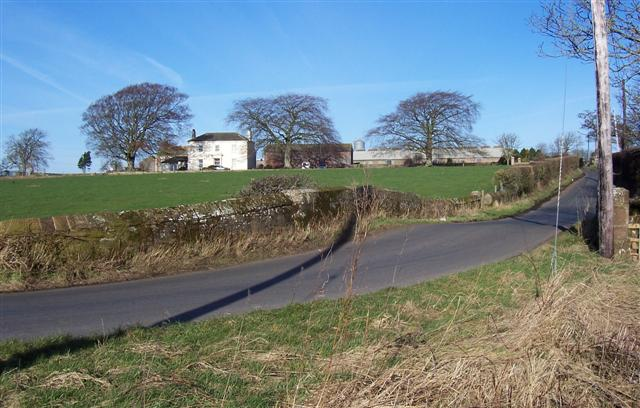
- Drumleaning

- Location in Allerdale, Cumbria Location within Cumbria
- OS grid reference: NY270518
- Civil parish: Aikton
- Unitary authority: Cumberland
- Ceremonial county: Cumbria
- Region: North West
- Country: England
- Sovereign state: United Kingdom
- Post town: WIGTON
- Postcode district: CA7
- Dialling code: 016973
- Police: Cumbria
- Fire: Cumbria
- Ambulance: North West
- UK Parliament: Penrith and Solway

Drumleaning is a hamlet in Cumbria, England. It is located 4 miles south of Drumburgh on a low ridge near the Wampool.
