= Brayton Park =

Hamlet in Cumbria, England

Coordinates: 54.771°N 3.301°W

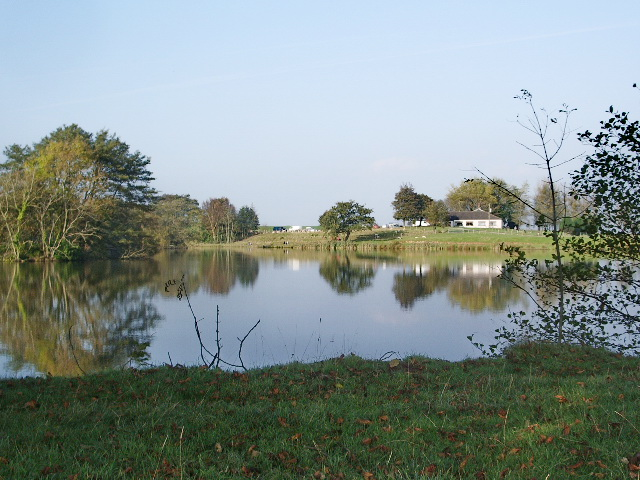
- Lake in Brayton Park

- Location in Allerdale, Cumbria Location within Cumbria
- OS grid reference: NY163425
- Civil parish: Aspatria
- Unitary authority: Cumberland
- Ceremonial county: Cumbria
- Region: North West
- Country: England
- Sovereign state: United Kingdom
- Post town: WIGTON
- Postcode district: CA7
- Dialling code: 016973
- Police: Cumbria
- Fire: Cumbria
- Ambulance: North West
- UK Parliament: Penrith and Solway

Brayton Park is a hamlet in Cumbria, England. It contains a small lake, notable for its fishing.
