= Broad Oak, Cumbria =

Hamlet in Cumbria, England

Coordinates: 54.338°N 3.364°W

Broad Oak
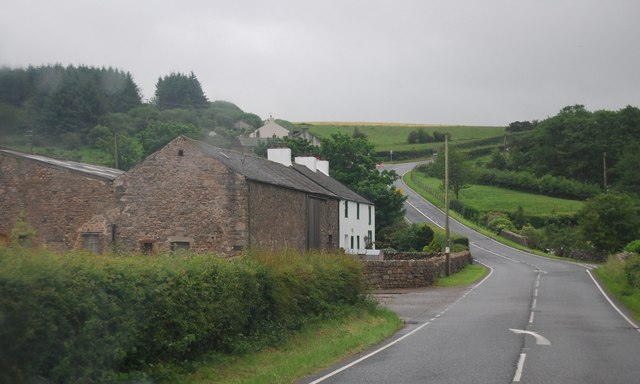
- Broad Oak by the A595

- Location in Copeland Borough Location within Cumbria
- OS grid reference: SD113944
- Civil parish: Waberthwaite; Muncaster
- Unitary authority: Cumberland
- Ceremonial county: Cumbria
- Region: North West
- Country: England
- Sovereign state: United Kingdom
- Post town: RAVENGLASS
- Postcode district: CA18
- Dialling code: 01229
- Police: Cumbria
- Fire: Cumbria
- Ambulance: North West
- UK Parliament: Barrow and Furness

Broad Oak is a hamlet in Cumbria, England. It is located along the A595 road, 14.4 miles (23.2 km) by road south of Egremont.

== See also ==
- List of places in Cumbria
