= Kelbarrow =

Hamlet in Cumbria, England

Coordinates: 54.455°N 3.031°W

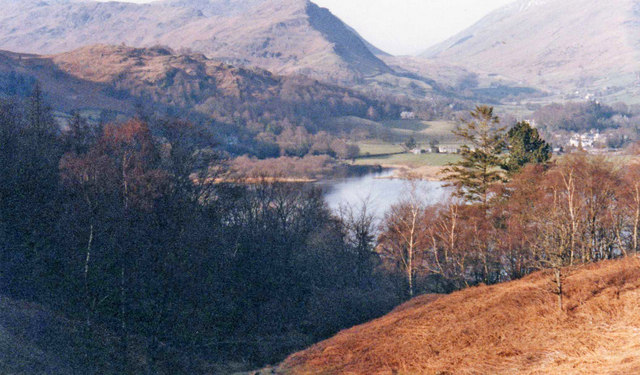
- Grasmere seen from near Kelbarrow

- Location in South Lakeland Location within Cumbria
- OS grid reference: NY331071
- Civil parish: Lakes
- Unitary authority: Westmorland and Furness
- Ceremonial county: Cumbria
- Region: North West
- Country: England
- Sovereign state: United Kingdom
- Post town: AMBLESIDE
- Postcode district: LA22
- Dialling code: 015394
- Police: Cumbria
- Fire: Cumbria
- Ambulance: North West
- UK Parliament: Westmorland and Lonsdale

Kelbarrow is a hamlet in Cumbria, England. It is located in close proximity to Grasmere, with views of Grasmere Lake.

== Notable people ==
- John Vaux of Kelbarrow, Constable of Carlisle in 1564.
- Edward Brown Lees
- Helen Sumner, granddaughter of Archbishop Sumner, antiquarian
