= Stubb Place =

Settlement in Cumbria, England

Coordinates: 54.302°N 3.410°W

- Location in Copeland Borough Location within Cumbria
- OS grid reference: SD082905
- Civil parish: Bootle
- Unitary authority: Cumberland
- Ceremonial county: Cumbria
- Region: North West
- Country: England
- Sovereign state: United Kingdom
- Post town: MILLOM
- Postcode district: LA19
- Dialling code: 01229
- Police: Cumbria
- Fire: Cumbria
- Ambulance: North West
- UK Parliament: Barrow and Furness

Stubb Place is a small settlement in western Cumbria, England. Due to the name of nearby cottages, it is known as Marshside by locals in Waberthwaite. It lies within the Lake District National Park.
