= Bolton Low Houses =

Village in Cumbria, England

Coordinates: 54.788°N 3.187°W

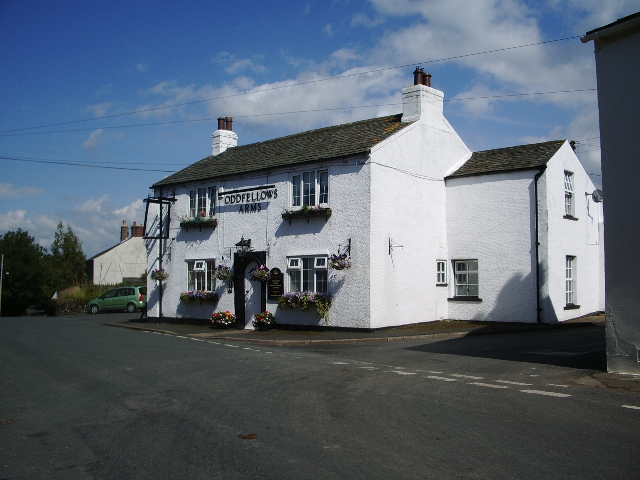
- Oddfellows Arms, Bolton Low Houses

- Location in Allerdale Location within Cumbria
- OS grid reference: NY236443
- Civil parish: Boltons
- Unitary authority: Cumberland
- Ceremonial county: Cumbria
- Region: North West
- Country: England
- Sovereign state: United Kingdom
- Post town: WIGTON
- Postcode district: CA7
- Dialling code: 016973
- Police: Cumbria
- Fire: Cumbria
- Ambulance: North West
- UK Parliament: Penrith and Solway

Bolton Low Houses is a small village in Cumbria, England. Historically part of Cumberland, it is located 3.1 miles (5.0 km) by road to the southwest of South End. There is a coal mining area to the east between Oughterside, Allhallows Colliery and Bolton No.2 Pit. In 1831, Samuel Lewis noted that there was a meeting house for dissenters in Bolton Low Houses. It contains a Methodist Chapel and a pub, the Oddfellows Arms.

== See also ==
- List of places in Cumbria
- Bolton New Houses
