= Cocklakes =

Hamlet in Cumbria, England

Coordinates: 54°51′01″N 02°51′06″W

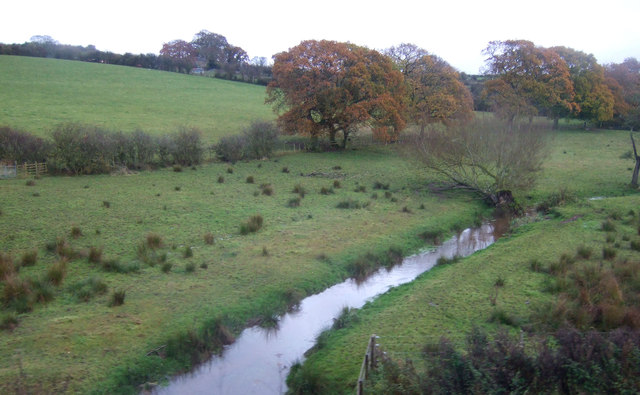
- Pow Maugham, Cocklakes

- Location in the former Carlisle district, Cumbria Location within Cumbria
- OS grid reference: NY454510
- Civil parish: St Cuthbert Without; Wetheral
- Unitary authority: Cumberland
- Ceremonial county: Cumbria
- Region: North West
- Country: England
- Sovereign state: United Kingdom
- Post town: CARLISLE
- Postcode district: CA4
- Dialling code: 01228
- Police: Cumbria
- Fire: Cumbria
- Ambulance: North West
- UK Parliament: Carlisle

Cocklakes is a hamlet in Cumbria, England. British Gypsum formerly had a plant in Cocklakes. It has a lake which is used for fishing. It is served by the A6 road.

== Name ==
The name of Cocklakes originated in Old English with the "Cock-" part of the name coming from the Old English word for "throat" or "ravine". During the Middle Ages, the name was "Cock-Laik", which meant "cockpit" in Middle English. Due to the name, it has been often reported as one of the rudest place names in the United Kingdom, due to cock being a vulgar slang term for penis.

== Mine ==
There had been small scale local mining in Cocklakes prior to the 19th century. Around 1830, the first commercial gypsum mining operations started. It was originally owned by John Howe & Co. before being transferred in 1910 to the Carlisle Plaster & Cement Company and later to British Gypsum in 1953. Cocklakes mine was also the first place to manufacture plasterboard in the United Kingdom, despite workers initially attempting to separate the paper from the plaster. Initially the mine operated on a small scale but due to the Second World War leading to a rise in demand for anhydrite for sulfuric acid. From there, the Cocklakes mine had an underground diesel railway constructed to help with the moving of raw materials.

Following the end of the war, a number of migrant workers from Eastern Europe came to Cumbria to work at Cocklakes mine. The railway changed its locomotives to newer diesel trains in 1970 with their old ones being taken by Carnforth Steam Museum by William Steuart Trimble who would become the High Sheriff of Cumberland. In 1975, the railway was put on care and maintenance.
