= Kelton Head =

Hamlet in Cumbria, England

Coordinates: 54.557°N 3.441°W

- Location in Copeland Borough Location within Cumbria
- OS grid reference: NY068189
- Civil parish: Lamplugh
- Unitary authority: Cumberland
- Ceremonial county: Cumbria
- Region: North West
- Country: England
- Sovereign state: United Kingdom
- Post town: WORKINGTON
- Postcode district: CA14
- Dialling code: 01946
- Police: Cumbria
- Fire: Cumbria
- Ambulance: North West
- UK Parliament: Whitehaven and Workington

Kelton Head is a hamlet in Cumbria, England. A map from 1774 shows it named Keltonhead, at that time located in the county of Cumberland. It has just four houses, and is very close to Kelton Head Quarry, near Rowrah. Despite this, it is in the Lamplugh Neighbourhood.

Samuel Lewis in "A Topographical Dictionary of England", published 1848, records Kelton as a township of 192 inhabitants. Kelton Iron Ore Mine, located on Keltonfell Top, was active from before 1869 but abandoned by 1914.
