= Cleabarrow =

Hamlet in Cumbria, England

Coordinates: 54.359°N 2.890°W

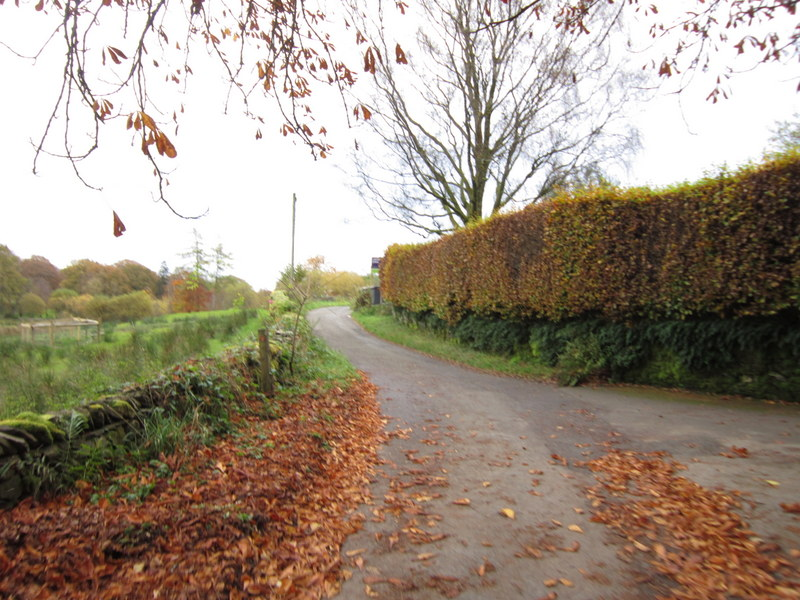
- The Dales Way, Cleabarrow

- Location in South Lakeland Location within Cumbria
- OS grid reference: SD421963
- Civil parish: Windermere
- Unitary authority: Westmorland and Furness
- Ceremonial county: Cumbria
- Region: North West
- Country: England
- Sovereign state: United Kingdom
- Post town: WINDERMERE
- Postcode district: LA23
- Dialling code: 015394
- Police: Cumbria
- Fire: Cumbria
- Ambulance: North West
- UK Parliament: Westmorland and Lonsdale

Cleabarrow is a hamlet in Cumbria, England. It gives its name to a small tarn in the area.
