= Stainton, Kingmoor =

Hamlet in Cumbria, England

Coordinates: 54.903°N 2.967°W

Stainton
- Hamlet
- Location in the Cumberland district, Cumbria Location within Cumbria
- OS grid reference: NY379569
- Civil parish: Kingmoor
- Unitary authority: Cumberland
- Ceremonial county: Cumbria
- Region: North West
- Country: England
- Sovereign state: United Kingdom
- Post town: CARLISLE
- Postcode district: CA3
- Dialling code: 01228
- Police: Cumbria
- Fire: Cumbria
- Ambulance: North West
- UK Parliament: Carlisle

Stainton is a hamlet in the Kingmoor parish of Cumberland, Cumbria, England. It is near the city of Carlisle. Circa 1870, it had a population of 63 as recorded in the Imperial Gazetteer of England and Wales.

== See also ==
- Listed buildings in Kingmoor
