= Cargo, Cumbria =

Village in Cumbria, England

Coordinates: 54.923°N 2.989°W

Cargo
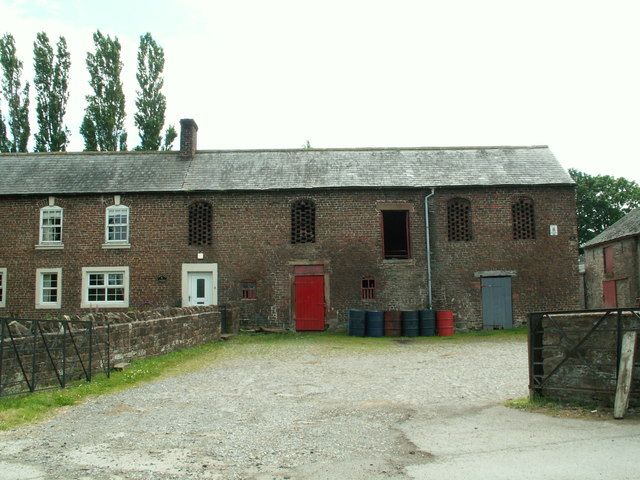
- Cargo Farm

- Location in the former City of Carlisle district, Cumbria Location within Cumbria
- OS grid reference: NY365592
- Civil parish: Kingmoor
- Unitary authority: Cumberland
- Ceremonial county: Cumbria
- Region: North West
- Country: England
- Sovereign state: United Kingdom
- Post town: CARLISLE
- Postcode district: CA6
- Dialling code: 01228
- Police: Cumbria
- Fire: Cumbria
- Ambulance: North West
- UK Parliament: Carlisle

Cargo is a small village near the River Eden on the Solway Plain. Cargo is about 3 1/2 miles (5.6 km) northwest of Carlisle in Cumbria in the North West of England. The name Cargo reflects a combination of two languages; from the Celtic word carreg meaning "rock" and from the Old Norse word haugr meaning "hill". Circa 1870, it had a population of 262 as recorded in the Imperial Gazetteer of England and Wales.

== See also ==
- Listed buildings in Kingmoor
