= Kingmoor =

Civil parish in Cumbria, England

Coordinates: 54.92°N 2.98°W

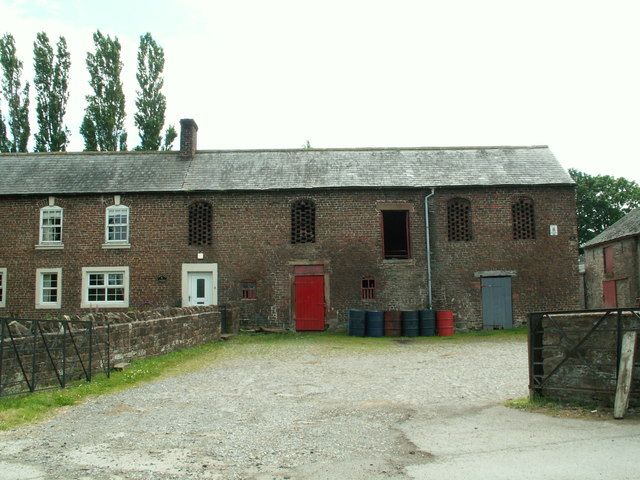
Cargo Farm in the parish

Kingmoor is a civil parish in the Cumberland district of Cumbria, England, to the north west of Carlisle city centre. At the 2011 census it had a population of 735.

The parish is bordered in the south and west by the River Eden, across which lies the parish of Beaumont; it is also bordered by Rockcliffe in the north, and Stanwix Rural and the unparished area of Carlisle in the east and south.

The parish includes the villages of Cargo, Crindledyke and Stainton.

The parish used to be larger and included the present day Carlisle suburbs of Kingstown, Moorville, Newfield and Lowry Hill. The Kingstown Industrial Estate lies partially within the parish. A large part of the parish used to be RAF Carlisle, most of which has now become the various Kingmoor Park business parks.

There is a parish council, the lowest tier of local government.

== Listed buildings ==
As of 2017 there are seven listed buildings in the parish, all at grade II.
