= Stainton with Adgarley =

Village in Cumbria, England

Coordinates: 54.142°N 3.151°W

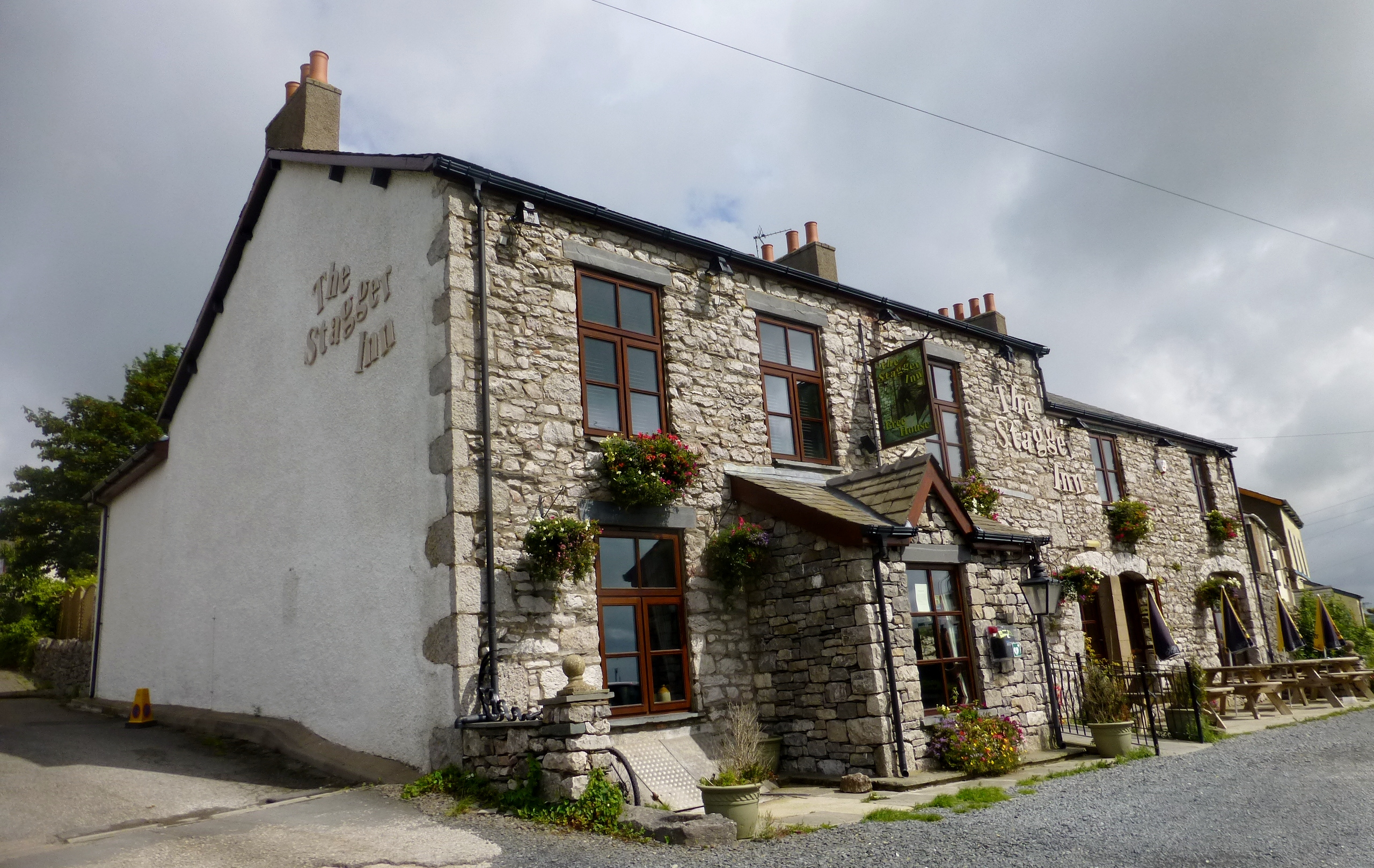
- The Stagger Inn public house, Stainton with Adgarley

- Location in South Lakeland Location within Cumbria
- OS grid reference: SD248724
- Civil parish: Urswick
- Unitary authority: Westmorland and Furness
- Ceremonial county: Cumbria
- Region: North West
- Country: England
- Sovereign state: United Kingdom
- Post town: BARROW-IN-FURNESS
- Postcode district: LA13
- Dialling code: 01229
- Police: Cumbria
- Fire: Cumbria
- Ambulance: North West
- UK Parliament: Barrow and Furness

Stainton with Adgarley is a small village in Cumbria, England. It is situated about 5 miles from Dalton-in-Furness. It is a small farming community and is served by the Urswick Bardsea and Stainton Parish Council.

There were once two villages, Stainton and Adgarley. The Stainton name comes from the original Steintun. Adgarley was once called Eadgarlith. Each has its own village green.

It contains a limestone quarry called Stainton Quarry, worked since before 1900.
