= Embleton, Cumbria =

Village and civil parish in Cumbria, England

Coordinates: 54.659°N 3.297°W

Embleton
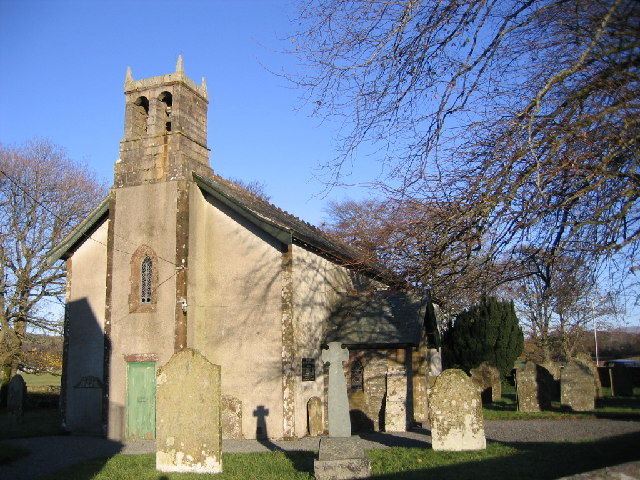
- Embleton Church

- Location within Cumbria
- Population: 278 (Parish, 2021)
- OS grid reference: NY163301
- Civil parish: Embleton
- Unitary authority: Cumberland
- Ceremonial county: Cumbria
- Region: North West
- Country: England
- Sovereign state: United Kingdom
- Post town: COCKERMOUTH
- Postcode district: CA13
- Dialling code: 017687
- Police: Cumbria
- Fire: Cumbria
- Ambulance: North West
- UK Parliament: Penrith and Solway
- Website: embletonparish.com

Embleton is a small village and civil parish located in the Cumberland district in Cumbria, England. It is located east of Cockermouth on the A66 road, and within the boundaries of the Lake District National Park.

The hamlet of Wythop Mill is within the parish about a mile south of the village, close to the boundary with Wythop civil parish.

== History ==
Sometime around 1854 a schoolmaster digging in common land at Embleton came across a hoard of weapons dating to the 1st century AD, the transition between the Late Iron Age and Early Roman period. It comprised three iron spearheads and two swords, one of which was in a decorated copper-alloy scabbard. The latter object can now be seen in the British Museum.

Embleton railway station opened in 1865, on the Cockermouth, Keswick and Penrith Railway, and was closed by British Rail in 1958 although the railway through the village survived until 1966. The trackbed has now been used for the route of the A66 road.

== Governance ==
There are two tiers of local government covering Embleton, at parish and unitary authority level: Embleton and District Parish Council and Cumberland Council. The parish council is a grouped parish council, covering the three civil parishes of Embleton, Setmurthy (in which the main settlement is Dubwath), and Wythop. The parish council meets at Embleton Village Hall. The parish is wholly within the Lake District National Park, and so some functions are administered by the Lake District National Park Authority, notably planning.

Embleton is within the Penrith and Solway UK Parliamentary constituency.

=== Administrative history ===
Embleton was historically a township in the ancient parish of Brigham, which formed part of the historic county of Cumberland. The township of Embleton took on civil functions under the poor laws from the 17th century onwards. As such, the township also became a civil parish in 1866, when the legal definition of 'parish' was changed to be the areas used for administering the poor laws.

When elected parish and district councils were established in 1894, Embleton was included in the Cockermouth Rural District. Cockermouth Rural District was abolished in 1974, becoming part of the borough of Allerdale in the new county of Cumbria. Allerdale was in turn abolished in 2023 when the new Cumberland Council was created, also taking over the functions of the abolished Cumbria County Council in the area.

== Demography ==
At the 2021 census the parish had a population of 278. At the 2001 census the population was 297, and in 2011 it was 294.

== See also ==
- Listed buildings in Embleton, Cumbria
- Embleton railway station
