= Setmurthy =

Civil parish in Cumbria, England

Coordinates: 54.6794°N 3.2660°W

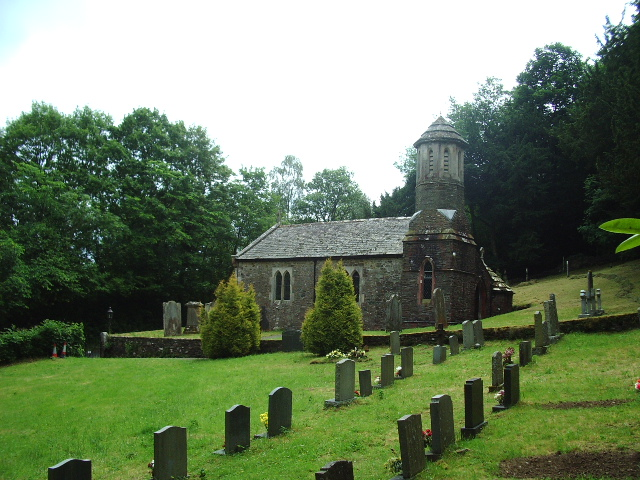
- St Barnabas' Church

- Location within Cumbria
- Population: 98 (Parish, 2021)
- Civil parish: Setmurthy
- Unitary authority: Cumberland
- Ceremonial county: Cumbria
- Region: North West
- Country: England
- Sovereign state: United Kingdom
- Post town: COCKERMOUTH
- Postcode district: CA13
- Police: Cumbria
- Fire: Cumbria
- Ambulance: North West
- UK Parliament: Penrith and Solway

Setmurthy is a civil parish in the Cumberland district of Cumbria, England. It lies within the Lake District National Park. The main settlement in the parish is Dubwath, on the shore of Bassenthwaite Lake.

== History ==
The spelling "Satmurthawe" is seen in 1473.

The parish church of St Barnabas, built in 1794, is grade II listed; it is in the Diocese of Carlisle and the Binsey Mission Community.

== Geography ==
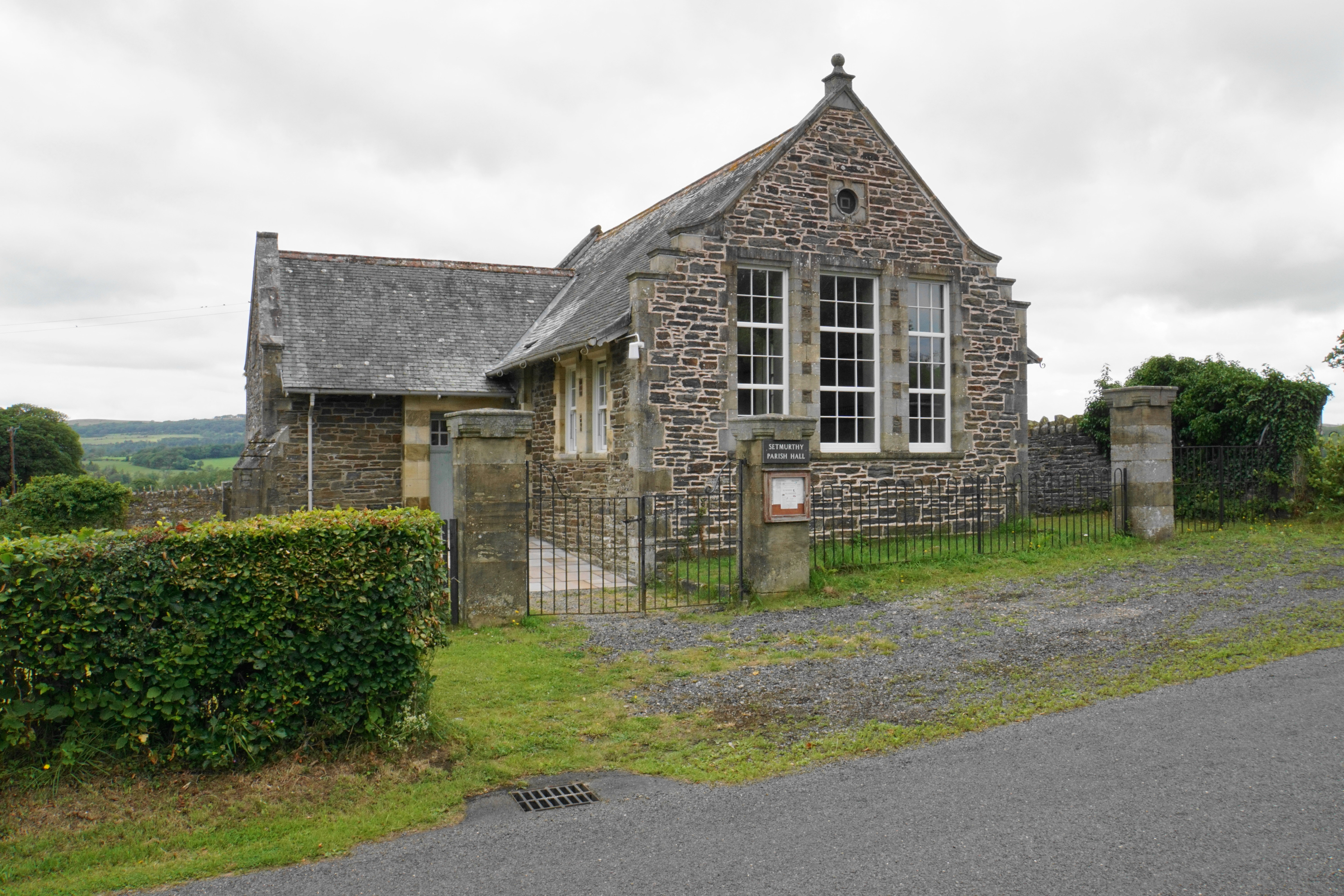
Setmurthy Village Hall

There is no built up area of Setmurthy as such; instead it comprises a loose-knit community around the parish church and a former school (built 1896) now used as a village hall.

The River Derwent forms the northern and eastern boundary of the parish, separating it from Blindcrake. Bassenthwaite Lake forms the eastern boundary, and the parish is then bordered by Above Derwent to the south east, Embleton to the west and south, and Cockermouth and Bridekirk to the west. The main settlement is the hamlet of Dubwath.

Watch Hill, also known as Setmurthy Common, reaches 254 metres (833 ft) and because of its relative isolation qualifies as a marilyn, a hill with 150 m of topographic prominence. Alfred Wainwright includes it in his The Outlying Fells of Lakeland, recommending an ascent from the west and a return on the same route. He comments that "It is easily attained with a minimum of effort: a stroll on grass so simple that boots are incongruous footwear for it and bare feet appropriate".

== Governance ==
There are two tiers of local government covering Setmurthy, at parish and unitary authority level: Embleton and District Parish Council and Cumberland Council. The parish council is a grouped parish council, covering the three civil parishes of Embleton, Setmurthy, and Wythop. The parish is wholly within the Lake District National Park, and so some functions are administered by the Lake District National Park Authority, notably planning.

Setmurthy is within the Penrith and Solway UK Parliamentary constituency.

=== Administrative history ===
Setmurthy was historically a township in the ancient parish of Brigham, which formed part of the historic county of Cumberland. The township took on civil functions under the poor laws from the 17th century onwards. As such, Setmurthy also became a civil parish in 1866, when the legal definition of 'parish' was changed to be the areas used for administering the poor laws.

St Barnabas' Church was a chapel of ease to St Bridget's Church, Brigham until 1835, when Setmurthy was made a separate ecclesiastical parish from Brigham.

When elected parish and district councils were established in 1894, Setmurthy was included in the Cockermouth Rural District. Cockermouth Rural District was abolished in 1974, becoming part of the borough of Allerdale in the new county of Cumbria. Allerdale was in turn abolished in 2023 when the new Cumberland Council was created, also taking over the functions of the abolished Cumbria County Council in the area.

== Population ==
At the 2021 census, the population was 98. In the 2011 census the population had been 110.

== Listed buildings ==
As of 2017 there are nine listed buildings in the parish; Hewthwaite Hall, dating from 1581, is grade II* and the others are grade II.
