= Brackenthwaite =

Brackenthwaite may refer to the following places in England:

- Brackenthwaite, Buttermere, Cumbria, a settlement some 6 miles (9.7 km) south of Cockermouth
- Brackenthwaite, Westward, Cumbria, a settlement some 3 miles (4.8 km) south-east of Wigton
- Brackenthwaite, North Yorkshire, a settlement some 4 miles (6.4 km) south-west of Harrogate
