= Brigham, Cumbria =

Village in Cumbria, England

Coordinates: 54.658°N 3.416°W

Brigham
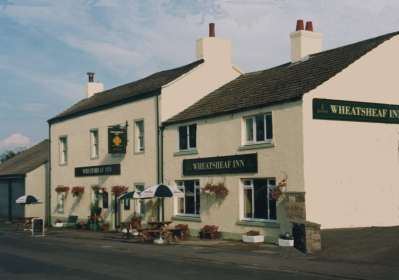
- The former Wheatsheaf Inn public house, Brigham

- Location within Cumbria
- Population: 1,100 (Parish, 2021)
- OS grid reference: NY085303
- Civil parish: Brigham
- Unitary authority: Cumberland
- Ceremonial county: Cumbria
- Region: North West
- Country: England
- Sovereign state: United Kingdom
- Post town: COCKERMOUTH
- Postcode district: CA13
- Dialling code: 01900
- Police: Cumbria
- Fire: Cumbria
- Ambulance: North West
- UK Parliament: Penrith and Solway

Brigham is a village and civil parish in the Cumberland district of Cumbria, England. The village is near to the town of Cockermouth and is located just outside the Lake District National Park.

== Toponymy ==
'Brigham' is 'homestead near the bridge'. 'Brycg' is OE (Old English) for 'bridge'; 'hām' is OE for 'village', 'homestead'.

== History ==
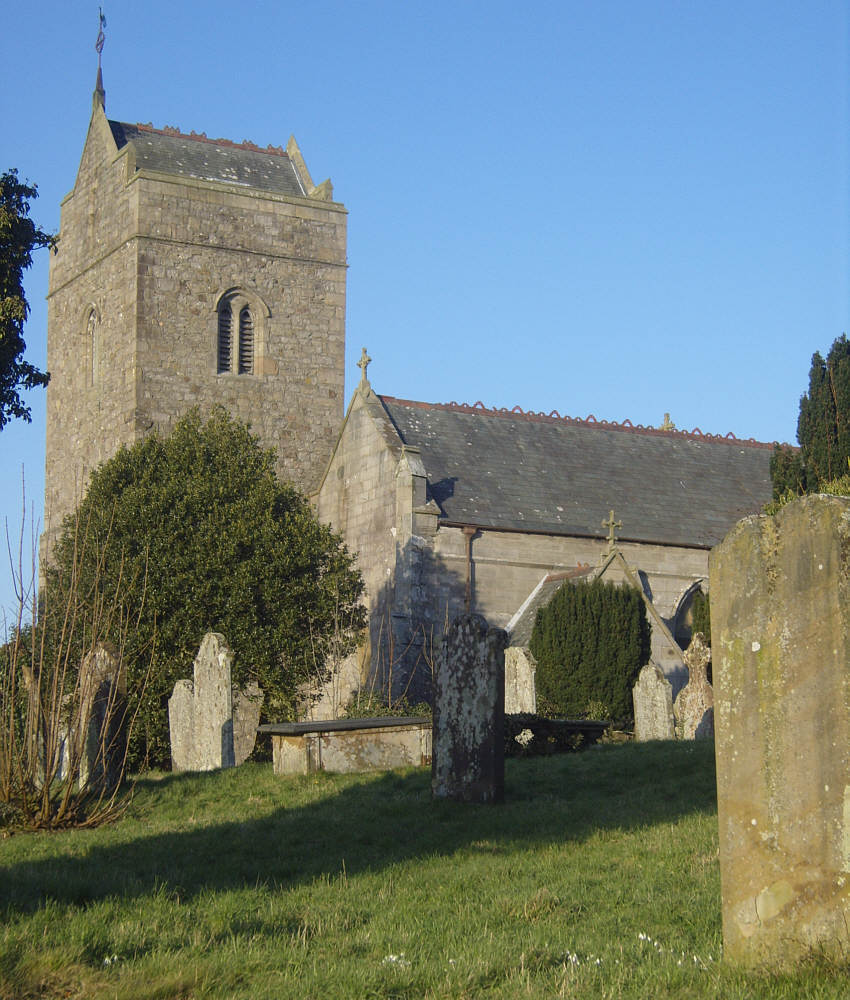
St. Bridget's Church, Low Brigham

Brigham has existed as a settlement since Neolithic times and an early centre of Christianity in Cumbria. The church of St Bridget's, was originally a Norman building, and is situated at the far north of the village, known as Low Brigham; it contains several fragments of pre-Norman crosses and other early carved stones. A disused quarry hosting businesses and a caravan holiday park is situated in the centre of the village, above which runs the main street (C2007) of High Brigham. The quarry is bisected by the non-pavemented road called Stang Lonning.

Brigham railway station opened in 1847 on the Cockermouth and Workington Railway. The station closed in 1966. At one time there was also a second station serving the hamlet of Broughton Cross, 1 km west of the main village.

The village gave its name to HMS Brigham, a Ham class minesweeper. The ship's bell from this vessel is now in St Bridget's Church of England primary school in the village. Until a more modern fire alarm system was installed, this bell was rung as the fire alarm for the school.

The family of Bounty mutineer Fletcher Christian are buried in the graveyard at St. Bridget's. Fletcher himself, born 1764 and raised in the township of Eaglesfield within Brigham parish (at that time), and christened at St. Bridget's, is thought to be buried on Pitcairn Island, though some have claimed that he returned secretly to England.

Brigham was a site for dialect research in the Survey of English Dialects and later in the Atlas Linguarum Europae.

== Community ==
The village has its own Church of England primary school; St. Bridget's, with just over 100 pupils. There is no longer a Post Office in Brigham, nor a grocery shop although there is still a social club. Brigham used to have 3 local pubs all of which have been converted into houses. They were The Appletree Inn (by the War Memorial Hall and Cuddy Croft Quarry), The Limekiln and The Wheatsheaf, both on Low Road. Housing estates known as High Rigg and The Hill are at the east and west ends of the village, with newer estates St. Bridget's and Butterfields Close in the north and south respectively. The Brigham War Memorial Hall was opened on 20 November 1924 (OS grid reference: NY 08501 30274).

== Governance ==
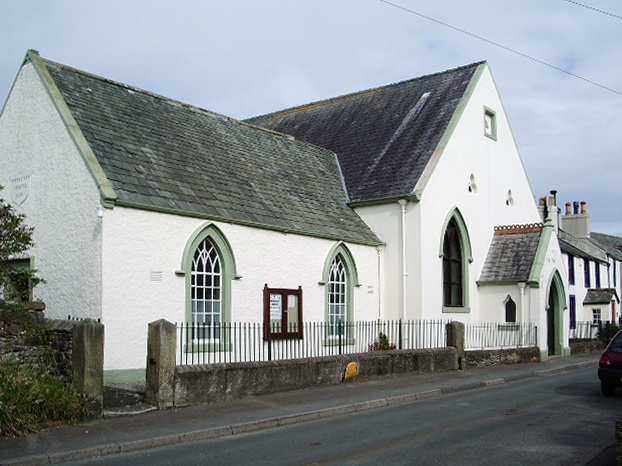
Brigham Methodist Church

There are two tiers of local government covering Brigham, at parish and unitary authority level: Brigham Parish Council and Cumberland Council. The parish council meets at Brigham Methodist Church.

Brigham is part of the Penrith and Solway constituency for elections to the UK parliament.

=== Administrative history ===
Brigham was an ancient parish in the historic county of Cumberland. The parish was large, and was subdivided into thirteen townships, some of which had chapels of ease. The townships were:

- Blindbothel
- Brackenthwaite
- Brigham
- Buttermere
- Cockermouth
- Eaglesfield
- Embleton
- Greysouthen
- Lorton
- Mosser
- Setmurthy
- Whinfell
- Wythop

From the 17th century onwards, parishes were gradually given various civil functions under the poor laws, in addition to their original ecclesiastical functions. In some cases, including Brigham, the civil functions were exercised by each township separately rather than the parish as a whole. In 1866, the legal definition of 'parish' was changed to be the areas used for administering the poor laws, and so the townships also became separate civil parishes.

When elected parish and district councils were established in 1894, Brigham was given a parish council and included in the Cockermouth Rural District. Cockermouth Rural District was abolished in 1974, becoming part of the borough of Allerdale in the new county of Cumbria. Allerdale was in turn abolished in 2023 when the new Cumberland Council was created, also taking over the functions of the abolished Cumbria County Council in the area.

== See also ==
- Listed buildings in Brigham, Cumbria
