= Jennings Brewery =

Brewery in Cumbria, England

Coordinates: 54°39′53.65″N 3°21′47.53″W

Jennings
- Company type: Brewery
- Industry: Brewing
- Founded: 1828
- Founder: John Jennings Snr
- Headquarters: Lorton, Cumbria (1828–1879); Cockermouth, Cumbria (1874–present)
- Products: Beer
- Owner: Kurt and Rebecca Canfield

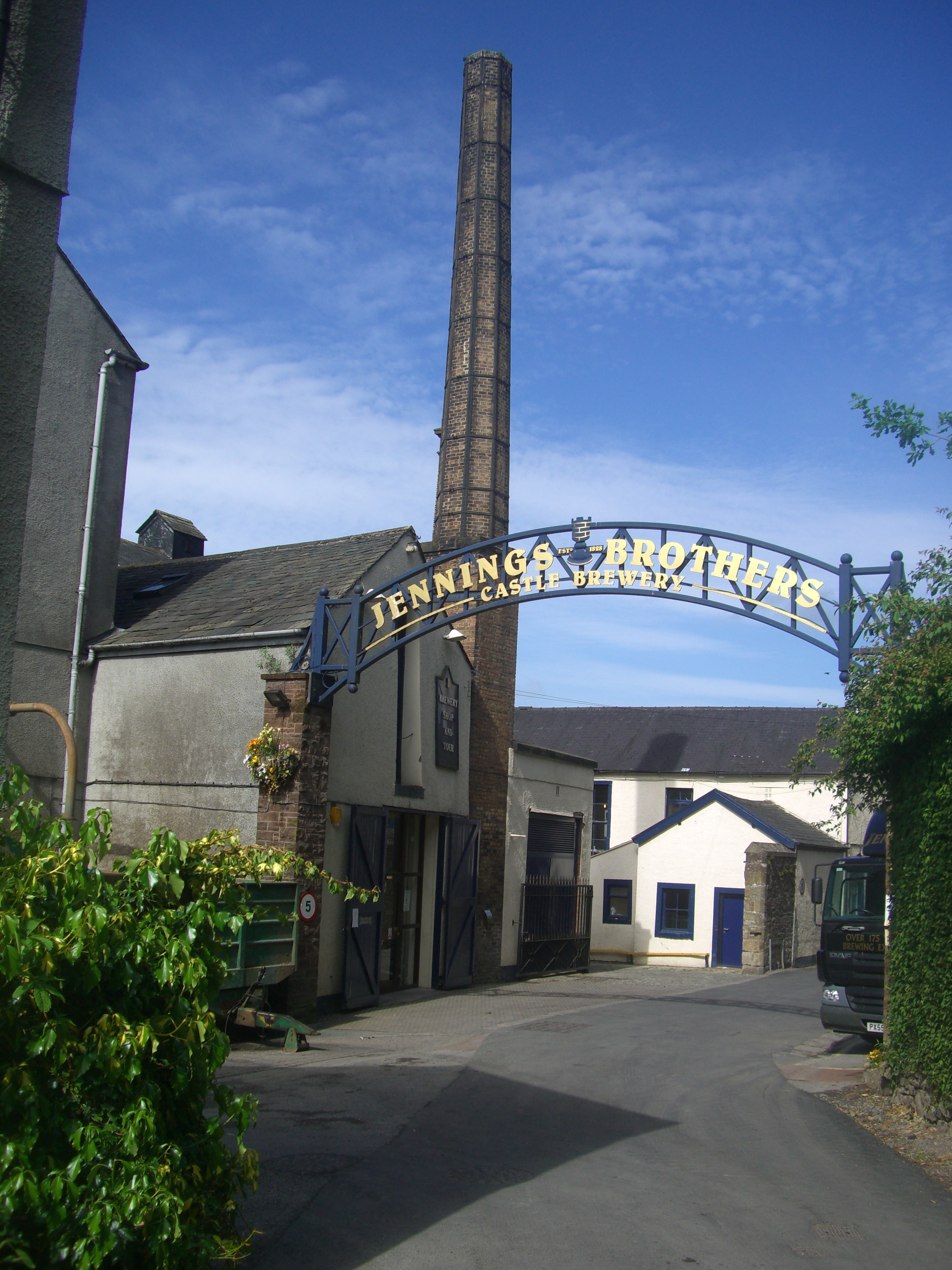
Jennings Brewery, Cockermouth

Jennings Brewery was established as a family concern in 1828 in the village of Lorton, between Buttermere and Cockermouth in the Lake District, England. The brewery was started by John Jennings Snr, son of William Jennings (a maltster). Jennings brewed exclusively in Lorton until 1874 when its present home, the Castle Brewery in Cockermouth, was purchased. The Lorton brewery closed some five years later.

Jennings Brewery brewed a range of ales using lakeland water drawn from the brewery's own well, malted Maris Otter barley from Norfolk and Goldings, Fuggles and Challenger hops from Kent, Herefordshire and Worcestershire. The malt used by Jennings Brewery is screened and crushed rather than ground into a flour to keep the husks as whole as possible. The hops used are flaked rather than the increasingly popular hop pellets available nowadays.

In May 2005, Jennings Brewery was purchased by the national brewer, Wolverhampton & Dudley Breweries (W&DB), (renamed Marston's Plc in January 2007). The purchase was opposed by the Campaign for Real Ale, which feared W&DB would close the Cockermouth brewery. In the short term these fears were unfounded, however, in June 2005 W&DB announced it would invest £250,000 to expand fermenting and cask racking capacity in Cockermouth; this work had been completed before the end of October 2008.

Following the takeover by W&DB, the brewery's distribution centre in Workington was closed and its tied estate of 127 pubs absorbed by the W&DB pub company.

In May 2020, Marston's announced that it would merge its brewing business with Carlsberg UK (the United Kingdom arm of Carlsberg Group), into a joint venture valued at £780 million. Marston's took a 40% stake in the merged firm. The deal involved Marston's six breweries and distribution depots, but not its 1,400 pubs.

In September 2022, the Carlsberg Marston's Brewing Company announced the closure of the brewery to take effect in early October. Jennings Cumberland Cask ale and bottled beer brands will be produced at Marston's Brewery, in Burton upon Trent, Staffordshire.

A month later, the site was placed on the market with the agents seeking offers of £750,000. Agents TSR stated the property is suitable for continuation as a commercial brewing operation or as a regeneration opportunity, respecting the historic significance of the site. In March 2024, the property failed to achieve its auction reserve price of £750,000. Agents SDL said they would continue to market the site for a post-auction sale.

As of February 2025 there were plans to re-open the brewery. New owners Kurt and Rebecca Canfield bought the Cockermouth brewery and the rights to the Jennings brand for an undisclosed sum.

== List of brewed ales ==
- Cumberland Ale (4.0% abv) - The brewery's biggest selling ale.
- Jennings Bitter (3.5% abv) - The original beer from the Jennings brewery in Cockermouth and the brewery's biggest seller in west Cumbria; since May 2019 this is now called Night Vision.
- Castle Bitter - Lakeland Ale (3.4% abv)

Seasonal Ales:

- Red Breast (4.5% abv Dec 2014 and Dec 2015) - Named from a line in The Redbreast Chasing the Butterfly by William Wordsworth, who was born in Cockermouth
- Cockle Warmer (4.2% abv Jan 2015) - Not to be confused with Laal Cockle Warmer
- Bloomin Marvellous (4.0% abv Apr 2015)
- Cocky Blonde (4.0% abv Jun 2015)
- Summit Else (4.2% abv Sep 2015)
- Bull's Eye (3.9% abv Oct 2015)
- Pigs Might Fly (3.9% abv Nov 2015)

Currently not in production:

- Laal Cockle Warmer (6.5% abv) - Winter seasonal ale from 1995 after former winter ale, Sneck Lifter went to all year round. "La'al" is the Cumbrian word for little and, due to the strength of this ale, it may sometimes be drunk in half pints. Cockle Warmer was last brewed in December 2005.
- Amber Ale (3.7% abv)
- Classic Pale Ale (4.2% abv)
- Porter (4.5% abv)
- Rye Beer (4.0% abv)
- Winter Ale (4.5% abv)
- Crag Rat (4.3% abv Mar-Apr) - Launched in May 2001. Named for slang for rock climbers. Has been found available out of season.
- Golden Host (4.3% abv Mar-Apr) - Named from a line in I Wandered Lonely as a Cloud by William Wordsworth.
- Tom Fool (4.0% abv) - Thomas Skelton of Muncaster Castle in the Lake District was known for his pranks or "Tomfoolery". Part of his will reads: "And when I'm bury'd then my friends may drink, but each man pay for his self, yt's best I thinke!"
- Fish King (4.3% abv) - Launched in 2005 when it was brewed as a celebration of the Lake District Osprey Project.
- World's Biggest Liar (4.3% abv) - Jennings sponsored the 2008 World's Biggest Liar competition held in Searton Bridge.
- Mountain Man (4.3% abv)
- Honey Bole (4.5% abv)
- Yan T'yan Tethera (3.8% abv) - Named for the Cumbrian dialect of "One, Two, Three" (shepherds counting sheep). Label on pump has sheep imaged.
- Swan's Lake (4.2% abv Oct-Nov) - Launched in 2008 and named after the Lakeside-Bowness ferry which has been running for 70 years.
- Cross Buttock (4.5% abv)
- 1828 (3.8% abv)
- Stickle Pike (3.8 abv)
- Sneck Lifter (5.1% abv) - Launched in 1990 as a winter beer and moved into all year round in 1995. "Sneck" is a northern word for door latch. A sneck lifter is a man's last sixpence, allowing him to lift the pub's door latch and purchase a pint, whereupon he hopes to make enough friends that they may offer to buy him further rounds.
- Cocker Hoop (4.6% abv) - Launched in 1995 as September Ale. Cock-a-hoop is the old custom of removing the cork from a barrel and resting it on the cask before the brewer adds his winnits to the brew. Its name was changed to Cocker Hoop as a reminder of the brewery's location on the banks of the River Cocker.
- Bitter Smooth (3.5% abv) - Launched in 1996; formerly named Old Smoothy
- Cumberland Cream (4.0% abv) - All malt brew flavoured with Styrian Golding hops.
- Jennings Dark Mild (3.1% abv) - A very dark, malty mild, which is characteristically sweet.

== Awards ==
- Great British Beer Festival 1999 Cocker Hoop received Best Bitter
- Drinktec 2005 International Milds, Stouts and Porters, class 2, Sneck Lifter received bronze

== See also ==
- British regional breweries using wooden casks

== Bibliography ==
- Good Beer Guide 2006, edited by Roger Protz, published by CAMRA Books
- Good Beer Guide 2009, edited by Roger Protz, published by CAMRA Books
- What Ales newsletter, Spring 2009, quarterly publication featuring story on Jennings Brewery (and advertisement), published by West Cumbria branch of CAMRA.
- Cumbria Real Ale Guide, edited by Jim Chapple, second edition 2008, published by Cumbria CAMRA
