= Greysouthen =

Village and civil parish in Cumbria, England

Coordinates: 54.648°N 3.441°W

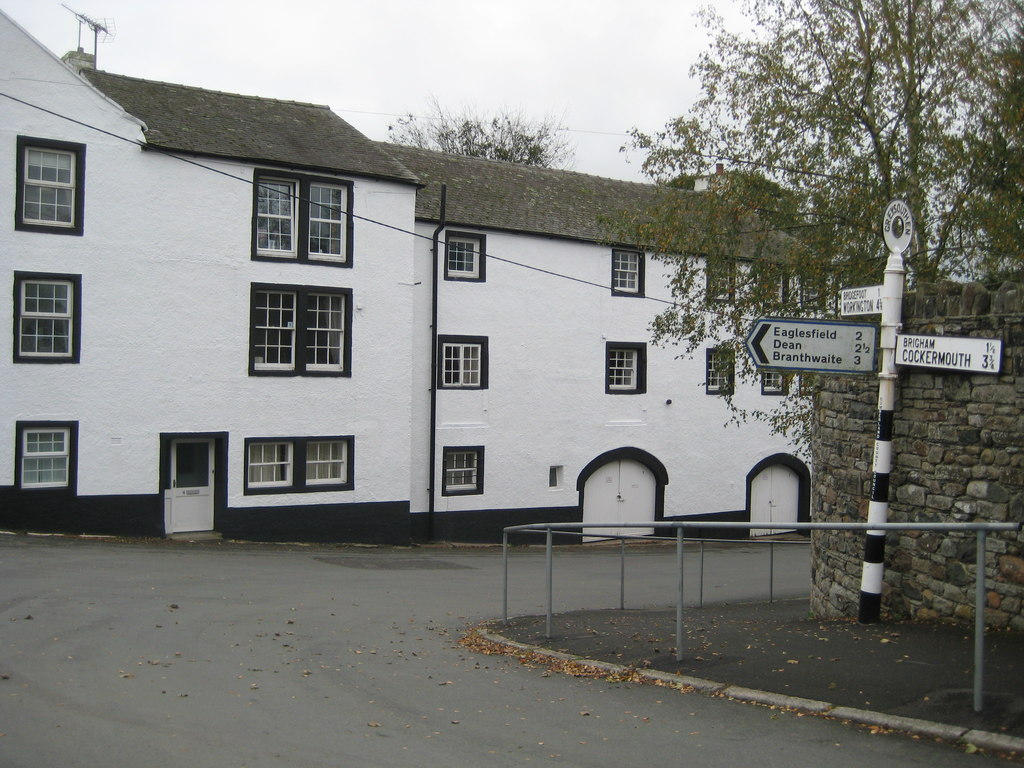
- The Old Punchbowl Pub in Greysouthen

- Location within Cumbria
- Population: 584 (Parish, 2021)
- OS grid reference: NY07086 29077
  - London: 250 mi (400 km) S
- Civil parish: Greysouthen
- Unitary authority: Cumberland
- Ceremonial county: Cumbria
- Region: North West
- Country: England
- Sovereign state: United Kingdom
- Post town: Cockermouth
- Postcode district: CA13
- Dialling code: 019000
- Police: Cumbria
- Fire: Cumbria
- Ambulance: North West
- UK Parliament: Whitehaven and Workington

Greysouthen (/ˈɡreɪsuːn/ GRAY-soon) is a village and civil parish between the towns of Workington and Cockermouth, in the Cumberland district of Cumbria, North West England. It lies a couple of miles outside the boundary of the Lake District National Park. The village has an historic association with coal mining.

== History ==
In 1870, Greysouthen was described as a settlement of 136 houses, with an agricultural implement factory, a Quakers' chapel, a Wesleyan chapel and a flax mill. In 1901 Greysouthen civil parish had an area of 1,558 acres.

=== Mining ===
There is evidence of settlers digging for coal across west Cumbria as early as the 13th century. Coal mining began in the Greysouthen area in the late 16th century.

A majority stake in Greysouthen's coal lease was sold to William Walker & Company in 1787. The business remained profitable for the next 80 years. Another firm entered Greysouthen's coal extraction industry in 1800. Wilson & Company invested in another colliery within Greysouthen. The two collieries distributed coal tokens which represented the success of the mines. Between these two mines a feud broke out over mine space. Wilson & Co was fined £16,000 damages over illegally mining William Walker & Company's land.

By the start of the 19th century Greysouthen's thriving mining industry had become the sole employer. To house miners, small rows of cottages were built within the town. In 1823 Joseph Birbeck and J.W. Flecter began mining in Greysouthen. A tax value of £20 was introduced for the annual lease of 400 tons of coal. For every ton mined over this, an additional tax of 1 shilling was applied.

The Melgramfitz pit was closed in 1886, which led to the end of the Greysouthen as a coal mining community.

Greysouthen's 19th century miners were known for their ale consumption, which magistrates felt was their prime concern.

== Governance ==
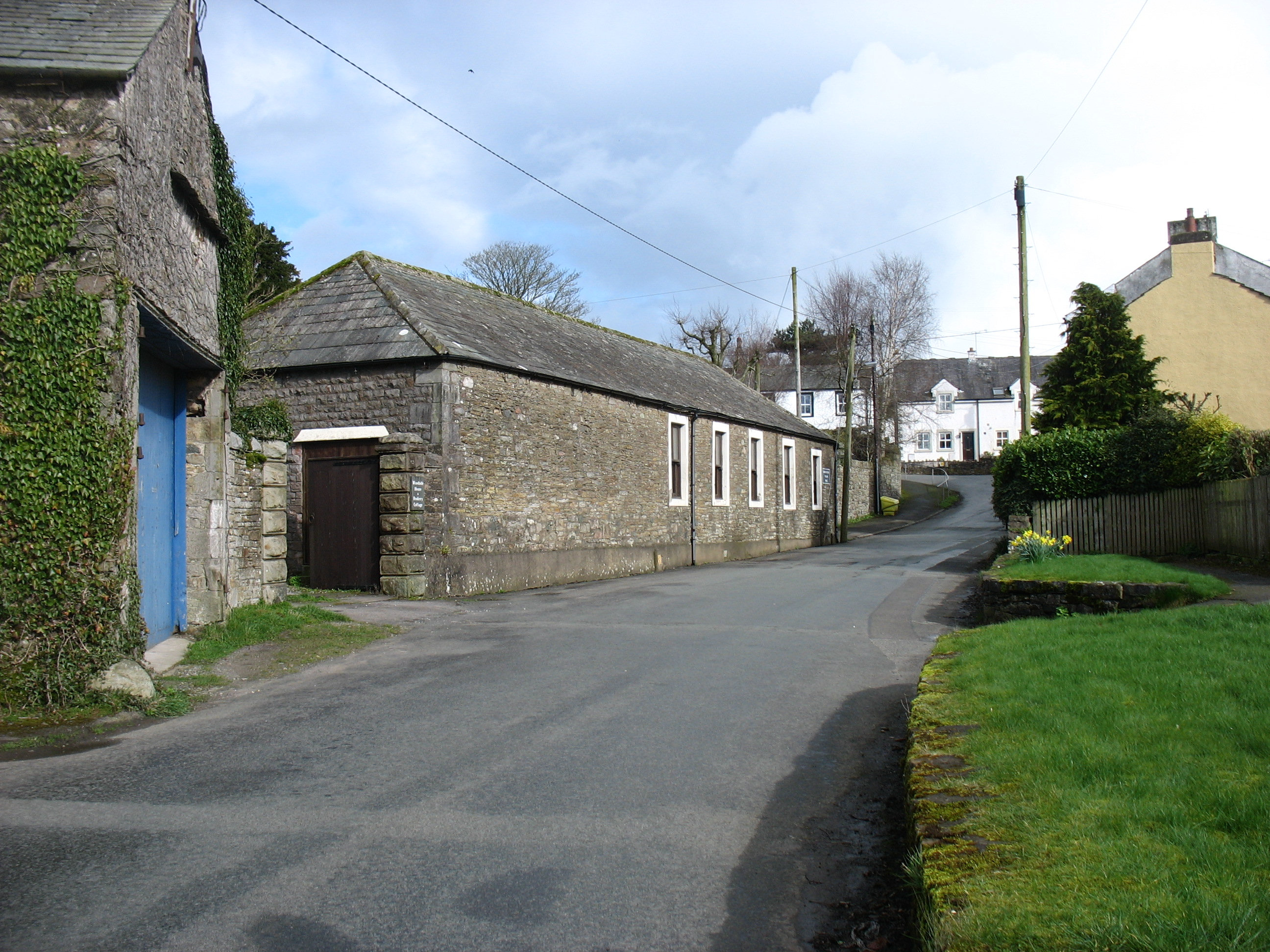
Greysouthen Village Hall, The Went

There are two tiers of local government covering Greysouthen, at parish and unitary authority level: Greysouthen Parish Council and Cumberland Council. The parish council meets at Greysouthen Village Hall on The Went.

For national elections, Greysouthen forms part of the Whitehaven and Workington constituency.

=== Administrative history ===
Greysouthen was historically a township in the ancient parish of Brigham, which formed part of the historic county of Cumberland. The township of Greysouthen took on civil functions under the poor laws from the 17th century onwards. As such, the township also became a civil parish in 1866, when the legal definition of 'parish' was changed to be the areas used for administering the poor laws.

When elected parish and district councils were established in 1894, Greysouthen was included in the Cockermouth Rural District. Cockermouth Rural District was abolished in 1974, becoming part of the borough of Allerdale in the new county of Cumbria. Allerdale was in turn abolished in 2023 when the new Cumberland Council was created, also taking over the functions of the abolished Cumbria County Council in the area.

== Community ==
Greysouthen is surrounded by farmland through which two streams run. The village is divided into two by the local residents – "up the went" and "down the went". The 'went' is a hill at the centre of Greysouthen.

St Josephs Roman Catholic Church is approximately 3 miles (5 km) from the centre of the village. Greysouthen has one large playing field with an adventure playground, football pitch, and a garden commemorating the Queen's Silver Jubilee.

Greysouthen had previously received a bus service, which stopped about ten times daily with connections to Workington and Cockermouth. The service was subsidised by the county council and operated by minor bus companies. It ended in 2015.

The village is in the catchment area for Paddle Primary Academy, a Church of England institution, in the neighbouring village of Eaglesfield, and is also in catchment for Cockermouth School and Keswick School, Cockermouth being nearer.

The parish council has been supporting Cumbrian rural communities over the introduction of superfast broadband and mobile coverage. Superfast broadband was activated in the village in January 2015.

== Ecology ==
There are 7 beaches within 10 miles (16 km) of Greysouthen, Siddick is the closest at about 5 miles (8 km); the second closest is Maryport then Workington, Crosscanonby, Allonby, Parton and Whitehaven.

The Greysouthen area supports a variety of bird species including northern lapwings, common snipes, Eurasian curlews, common woodpigeons, buzzards, Eurasian oystercatchers, common pheasants, Eurasian sparrowhawks, and quail. Red squirrels are also found. Orange tips, red admirals, and painted lady butterflies occur within the area.

Locally growing west Cumbrian wild plants include the greater butterfly orchid, early purple orchid and yellow rattle.

== Population ==
Population growth in Greysouthen 1880 to 1960

Year	Pop.	±%
1880	700	—
1890	550	−21.4%

Year	Pop.	±%
1900	490	−10.9%
1910	525	+7.1%

Year	Pop.	±%
1920	514	−2.1%
1930	506	−1.6%

Year	Pop.	±%
1950	502	−0.8%
1960	500	−0.4%

The population of Greysouthen between 1880 and 1900 fell by about 210 people in a 20-year period, this a period after the closure of the local mines.

== See also ==
- Listed buildings in Greysouthen
