= Dubwath =

Hamlet in Cumbria, England

Coordinates: 54.669°N 3.245°W

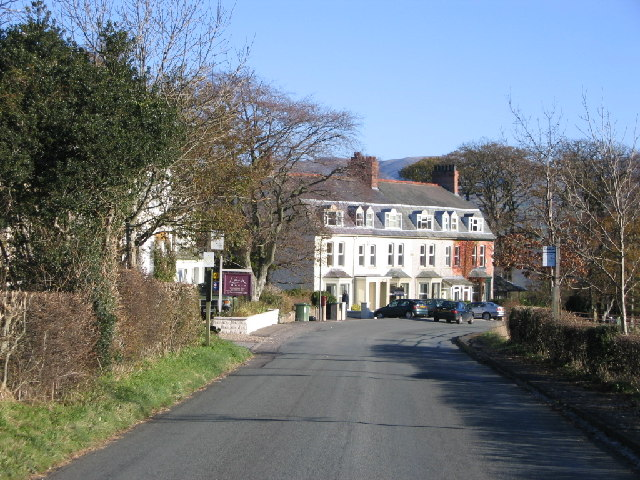
- Dubwath

- Location in Allerdale, Cumbria Location within Cumbria
- OS grid reference: NY196311
- Civil parish: Setmurthy
- Unitary authority: Cumberland
- Ceremonial county: Cumbria
- Region: North West
- Country: England
- Sovereign state: United Kingdom
- Post town: COCKERMOUTH
- Postcode district: CA13
- Dialling code: 017687
- Police: Cumbria
- Fire: Cumbria
- Ambulance: North West
- UK Parliament: Penrith and Solway

Dubwath is a hamlet in the Cumberland district, in Cumbria, England. It is part of the parish of Setmurthy. The population of this civil parish taken at the 2011 Census was 148.

It is situated on the B5291 road between Cockermouth and Keswick. It is directly adjacent to Bassenthwaite Lake (a popular sailing location). It used to be served by Bassenthwaite Lake railway station, the railway now having been replaced with an A road, the A66. It is on the Workington to Penrith via Keswick bus route.

Dubwath contains a sailing club and a restaurant called Pheasant Inn. Most of the buildings date back to Victorian times. Rallies are often staged on the roads around Dubwath. The sailing club is a popular tourist location, particularly during 'Bass week' in the summer.

At Dubwath Silver Meadows lottery-funded Bassenthwaite Reflections has established the Lake District's first wetlands nature reserve. The 7.15 hectares (17.7 acres) site at the northern end of Bassenthwaite Lake is a wildlife haven for nature lovers and bird watchers and an excellent example of 'fen' habitat. It is accessible by wheelchairs and uses recycled plastic boardwalks. There are viewing points for birdlife and red squirrels - all encouraged by regularly topped up feeders.

== Governance ==
Dubwath is within the Penrith and Solway UK Parliamentary constituency.

It has its own parish council, jointly with the parishes of Setmurthy and Wythop, known as Embleton and District Parish Council.
