= Listed buildings in Wythop =

Wythop is a civil parish in the Cumberland district, Cumbria, England. It contains six listed buildings that are recorded in the National Heritage List for England. All the listed buildings are designated at Grade II, the lowest of the three grades, which is applied to "buildings of national importance and special interest". The parish is in the Lake District National Park and is entirely rural. The listed buildings are houses, farmhouses, farm buildings, a public house, and a former mill.

== Buildings ==
Name and location	Photograph	Date	Notes
Wythop Hall and former stables 54.64442°N 3.23662°W	—	16th century (probable)	The building originated as the hall and kitchen wing of a fortified house, and were extended in 1678. The house is rendered on an irregular plinth and has a green slate roof. It has two storeys, three bays, a porch, a door with an architrave and a dated lintel, and sash windows with continuous hood moulds. The stables are at right angles, they are built in rubble with a corrugated iron roof. They contain a mullioned window in the ground floor, a plank door, and a casement window in the upper floor.
Sale Farmhouse and outbuildings 54.66181°N 3.24992°W	—	1669	The farmhouse and attached byre and barns are rendered with green slate roofs. The house has two storeys and four bays, and is flanked by the outbuildings that also have a rear extension, giving a T-shaped plan. The doorway and sash windows have stone surrounds. The other buildings have a door and a casement window. Inside the house is a bressumer.
Routenbeck Cruck Barn; 54.66249°N 3.24906°W	—	Late 17th or early 18th century	The former barn is in Lakeland rubble and has a roof of Westmorland slate. There are five bays, with outshuts flanking the doorway. To the north is a single-storey single-bay loft. Inside the building four cruck trusses have survived.
Routenbeck House; 54.66239°N 3.24866°W	—	Early 18th century	The house was extended later in the 18th century. It is roughcast with angle pilasters, the older part is on projecting plinth stones, and it has a green slate roof with coped gables. There are two storeys, the older part has two bays, and the later part to the left is higher with three bays. The windows are sashes in stone surrounds.
The Pheasant Inn; 54.66504°N 3.24232°W		Late 18th century	A former coaching inn, the public house is in stone, mainly rendered, with a Lakeland slate roof. There are two storeys and an L-shaped plan, with two ranges at right angles, the north range with ten bays, a west range of four bays with a hipped roof, and a four-bay rear projection. The windows are a mix of casements and sashes. In the west wing are two blocked arches, with a sign depicting a pheasant over the left arch. At the rear are external steps leading to a first-floor doorway.
Wythop Mill Cottage and former mill 54.65380°N 3.27459°W	—	Late 18th century	These consist of a cottage, with another cottage added as an extension at right angles, and a former mill beyond that. They are roughcast with green slate roofs. The cottages have two storeys, and two bays each. All parts have plank doors. The windows are sashes, those in the original cottage have stone surrounds, and in the extension the surrounds are chamfered.
