= Lorton, Cumbria =

Pair of villages in Cumbria, England

Coordinates: 54°37′09″N 3°18′30″W

Lorton
- Civil parish
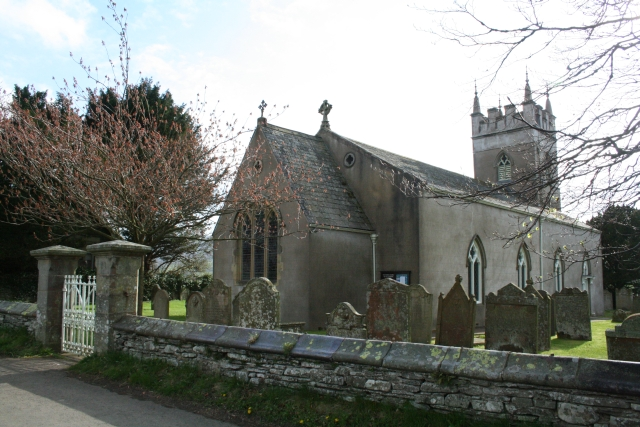
- St Cuthbert's Church, Lorton

- Location within Cumbria
- Population: 253 (Parish, 2021)
- OS grid reference: NY1602623548
- Civil parish: Lorton
- Unitary authority: Cumberland
- Ceremonial county: Cumbria
- Region: North West
- Country: England
- Sovereign state: United Kingdom
- Post town: COCKERMOUTH
- Postcode district: CA13
- Dialling code: 01900
- Police: Cumbria
- Fire: Cumbria
- Ambulance: North West
- UK Parliament: Penrith and Solway

Lorton is a village and civil parish in the Cumberland district of Cumbria, England. The village is in two parts: Low Lorton and High Lorton, with the parish church of St Cuthbert standing between them. Lorton is at the northern end of the Vale of Lorton, part of the valley of the River Cocker, and it is surrounded by fells such as Grasmoor, Hopegill Head and Whiteside. They are about 4 miles (6.5 km) from Cockermouth, which gives access to the main A66 road. Other nearby places include Loweswater and Brigham.

== Toponymy ==
The second element in the name "Lorton" is from the Old English "tūn" meaning farmstead or village, but the first is enigmatic. Experts have suggested the Old Norse river name "Hlóra", meaning roaring, as with the Norwegian "Lora". The roaring may refer to the Whit Beck or to the River Cocker.

== History ==
=== Agriculture, brewing and writing ===
In 1811, Lorton peaked in prosperity and population due to high demand for farm products as England recovered from the Napoleonic Wars (1803–1815). Most residents were employed across the six farms, including one attached to the 17th-century New House. These were powered by fast-flowing tributaries of the River Cocker, running the length of the valley. Most houses and cottages started as barns and mills. Church records indicate a post-war depression from 1816 to 1830, with a population decrease of about 50 and smaller numbers of marriages.

Jennings Brewery was set up in Lorton in 1828 by John Jennings and brewed here exclusively until 1874.

Lorton Park is a Grade II Listed Regency House owned in the 19th century by Richard Harbord, a Liverpool shipping magnate buried in the parish church. In 1863, Prince Arthur visited Lorton Park and planted a commemorative chestnut tree in the gardens.

The writer and newspaper publisher Ann Fisher was born in this parish in 1819 as was the novelist and agricultural writer and activist Doreen Wallace (1897–1989).

In the Imperial Gazetteer of England and Wales (1870–1872) by John Marius Wilson, Lorton was described as "a village, a township, and a parish in Cockermouth district, Cumberland". Wilson gave some early key statistics on the value of real property (£3,288), the head count (456) and the area (5264 acres, 2130 ha). Lorton was mentioned some 15 years later in the Gazetteer of the British Isles (1887) by John Bartholomew, whose figures show some changes: the population was down by 59 at 397 and the area up by 54 acres at 5318 acres (2152 ha).

The poet William Wordsworth, born in nearby Cockermouth, immortalised the Lorton Yew Tree in his poem "Yew Trees" in 1804. It is estimated to be at least 1,000 years old, but was severely damaged by a storm shortly after the poem was written.

== Geography ==
The village is in two parts: High Lorton on higher ground to the east, and Low Lorton by the banks of the River Cocker to the west. The small primary school, village shop, and village hall (Yew Tree Hall) are at High Lorton, and the village's only public house, the Wheatsheaf Inn, is at Low Lorton. St Cuthbert's Church stands between High Lorton and Low Lorton.

The parish extends eastwards from the River Cocker up into the high ground either side of the Whinlatter Pass. The road over the pass (the B5292) connects Lorton with Braithwaite to the east. The B5289 also passes through the parish, running roughly parallel to the River Cocker, passing through Low Lorton and linking the village with Cockermouth to the north and Buttermere and Loweswater to the south.

Lorton in Fairfax County, Virginia, United States, is named after it.

== Education ==
Lorton School is one of the oldest in Cumberland. Although there is evidence of schooling dating back to the 1500s, the school was opened officially in 1809 and has been extended many times. It now has capacity for 70 pupils. Many of the pupils come from within catchment, which includes all of the Loweswater and Buttermere Valleys as well as Wythop and Embleton, small villages some miles away, lining the A66. A number of pupils travel from Cockermouth. The school is known for its strong focus on using its unique location to enhance its children's education, with outdoor learning being a mainstay of the school day.

== Tourism ==
Lorton is relatively untouched by tourism, but many pass through on the way to the Buttermere valley. There are several hill walks available. For instance, Hopegill Head can be climbed from High Lorton and Fellbarrow from Low Lorton. Of interest are the 12th-century St Cuthbert's Church and the 1663 pele tower, but the latter is closed to the public.

== Governance ==
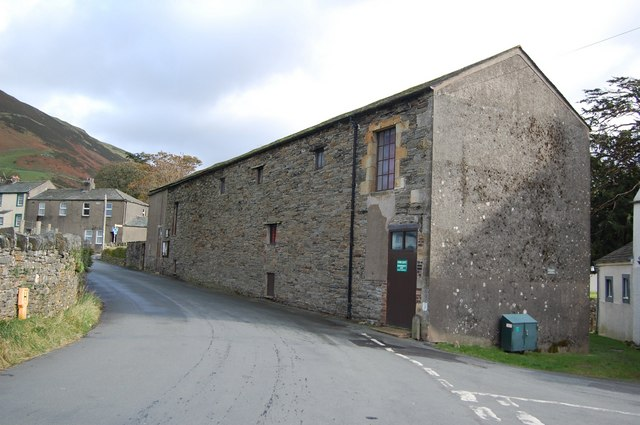
Yew Tree Hall, High Lorton

There are two tiers of local government covering Lorton, at parish and unitary authority level: Lorton Parish Council and Cumberland Council. The parish council meets at Yew Tree Hall, a late 18th or early 19th century maltings building at High Lorton which was formerly part of Jennings Brewery, but has now been converted into the village hall. The parish is wholly within the Lake District National Park, and so some functions are administered by the Lake District National Park Authority, notably planning. The parish council works in partnership with the three neighbouring parishes of Blindbothel, Buttermere, and Loweswater as the Melbreak Communities, particularly to respond to issues of flooding along the River Cocker.

For national elections, the parish forms part of the Penrith and Solway constituency.

=== Administrative history ===
Lorton was historically a township in the ancient parish of Brigham, in the historic county of Cumberland. The parish of Brigham was large, and its four south-eastern townships of Brackenthwaite, Buttermere, Lorton, and Wythop were served by a chapel of ease at Lorton. Further chapels subordinate to the one at Lorton were subsequently also established at Buttermere and Wythop.

The township of Lorton took on civil functions under the poor laws from the 17th century onwards. As such, the township also became a civil parish in 1866, when the legal definition of 'parish' was changed to be the areas used for administering the poor laws. The parish of Lorton was included in the Cockermouth Rural District from 1894.

Cockermouth Rural District was abolished in 1974, becoming part of the borough of Allerdale in the new county of Cumbria. Allerdale was in turn abolished in 2023 when the new Cumberland Council was created, also taking over the functions of the abolished Cumbria County Council in the area.

== Population ==
At the 2021 census, the parish had a population of 253. At the 2001 census, Lorton had a population of 250.

== See also ==
- Listed buildings in Lorton, Cumbria
