= Blindbothel =

Parish in Cumbria, England

Coordinates: 54.634°N 3.366°W

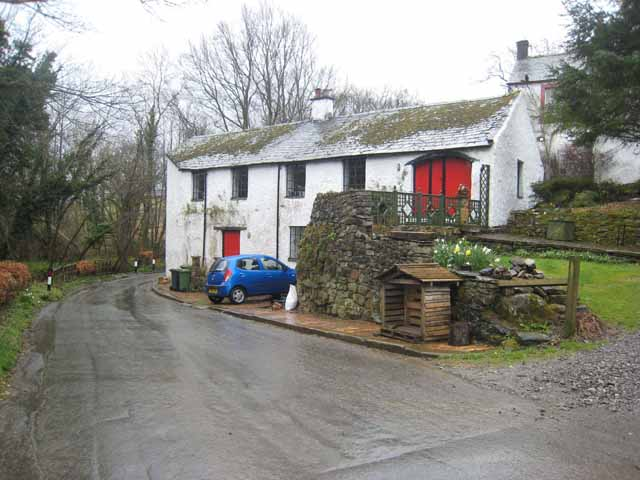
- Aikbank Mill, Blindbothel

- Location within Cumbria
- Population: 148 (Parish, 2021)
- OS grid reference: NY118274
- Civil parish: Blindbothel
- Unitary authority: Cumberland
- Ceremonial county: Cumbria
- Region: North West
- Country: England
- Sovereign state: United Kingdom
- Post town: COCKERMOUTH
- Postcode district: CA13
- Dialling code: 01228; 01900
- Police: Cumbria
- Fire: Cumbria
- Ambulance: North West
- UK Parliament: Penrith and Solway

Blindbothel is a civil parish in the Cumberland district of Cumbria, England. It lies within the Lake District National Park, and is a couple of miles south of the town of Cockermouth. There is no village called Blindbothel; instead the parish comprises a largely rural area containing several small farming hamlets.

== History ==
In the 1870s Blindbothel was described as:

"Blindbothel, a township in Brigham parish, Cumberland; 2 miles W of Cockermouth. Real property, £1,206. Pop., 116. Houses, 19."

== Geography ==
Blindbothel has an area of around 500 hectares (1,200 acres) On the east of Blindbothel is the River Cocker which flows to Cockermouth.

== Governance ==
There are two tiers of local government covering Blindbothel, at parish and unitary authority level: Blindbothel Parish Council and Cumberland Council. The parish is wholly within the Lake District National Park, and so some functions are administered by the Lake District National Park Authority, notably planning. The parish council works in partnership with the three neighbouring parishes of Buttermere, Lorton, and Loweswater as the Melbreak Communities, particularly to respond to issues of flooding along the River Cocker.

=== Administrative history ===
Blindbothel was historically a township in the ancient parish of Brigham, in the historic county of Cumberland. The township took on civil functions under the poor laws from the 17th century onwards. As such, the township also became a civil parish in 1866, when the legal definition of 'parish' was changed to be the areas used for administering the poor laws.

The parish of Blindbothel was included in the Cockermouth Rural District from 1894. In 1934, the parish was enlarged to take in the area of the abolished neighbouring parishes of Mosser and Whinfell. Cockermouth Rural District was abolished in 1974, becoming part of the borough of Allerdale in the new county of Cumbria. Allerdale was in turn abolished in 2023 when the new Cumberland Council was created, also taking over the functions of the abolished Cumbria County Council in the area.

== Population ==
At the 2021 census, the population was 148. The population was 174 according at the 2011 census.

The graph below shows the change in total population in Blindbothel from 1891 to 2011. The total population has gradually increased over time. The sharp increase between the 1931 and 1951 censuses may be attributed to the enlargement of the parish in 1934 to absorb Mosser and Whinfell. Out of the four civil parishes of Buttermere, Lorton and Loweswater, Blindbothel has the smallest population, as the land is mostly for agricultural use. However more recently the adaption for tourism has supplemented the land.

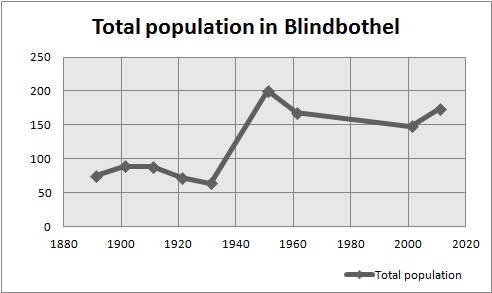
Total Population in Blindbothel from 1891 to 2011 thumbnail

The population density of Blindbothel in 2011 was 0.1 people per hectare. The 2011 census data show the mean age of Blindbothel was 43.7. With most people being in the 45–59 age group. Showing there are mostly older people living in Blindbothel. There were also more males than females living in Blindbothel in 2011, as there were 83 females and 91 males.

== Housing ==
According to the 2011 census data, there are 70 households in total, however there were 72 in 2001, showing a slight decline. The 2011 census data also showed that 33 were married households with no dependent children, suggesting that older couples may have either moved here when their children are no longer dependent, or they have lived in Blindbothel since their children were young, as in another statistic most of the households in Blindbothel in 2011 have 2 people in each household. The type of housing is relatively similar, 45 of the households in Blindbothel in the 2011 census were detached, followed by 17 semi-detached, the housing may have all been built at around the same time, suggesting why.

== Education ==
The Eaglesfield Paddle C. E. Primary Academy is the only school in Blindbothel, according to the 2011 census data, there were 4 schoolchildren living in Blindbothel, so there isn't a high demand for educational facilities there. The former Grant Maintained school, known as 'Paddle School' also offers a nursery class and aims to help children "become independent, confident, self disciplined individuals, proud of their achievements and sensitive to the needs of others"

== Industry ==
In 1881 the most common occupational order for men was agriculture, where as the women were either domestic or didn't have a specified occupation. The land used to be mostly for agriculture and there are little services available in Blindbothel even now, so there are a lack of jobs available in the village, as in the 2011 census data, most people are in professional occupations or are Managers, Directors and Senior Officials. The data also shows that 23 people are retired, so most of the residents of Blindbothel are still economically active.

== See also ==
- Listed buildings in Blindbothel
