= Listed buildings in Buttermere, Cumbria =

Buttermere is a civil parish in the Cumberland district of Cumbria, England. It contains eleven listed buildings that are recorded in the National Heritage List for England. All the listed buildings are designated at Grade II, the lowest of the three grades, which is applied to "buildings of national importance and special interest". The parish is in the Lake District National Park and contains lakes and fells with the valleys between them. In the valleys are the village of Buttermere, and the settlement of Brackenthwaite; all the listed buildings are in the valleys, most of them in or near the settlements. They consist of farmhouses and farm buildings, houses, and a church.

== Buildings ==
Name and location	Photograph	Date	Notes
High Hollins House; 54.59280°N 3.30266°W	—	Late 16th to early 17th century	A former farmhouse, stuccoed, with a green slate roof, in two storeys and with seven bays. It has a 20th-century door in a Tudor arched surround and a hood mould. The windows on the front are casements, and at the rear they are cross-mullioned. Inside the house is an inglenook and a large bressumer.
Hopebeck; 54.60379°N 3.29712°W	—	Mid or late 17th century	A roughcast farmhouse in a projecting plinth with a green slate roof. It has two storeys and seven bays. There are two doorways, one with an architrave and a hood mould, and the windows are mullioned. At the rear are two gabled extensions.
Bowderbeck; 54.53888°N 3.27100°W	—	Late 17th century	A farmhouse in rubble with a green slate roof, in two storeys and two bays, with a rear outshut. On the front is a gabled porch, and the windows are mullioned.
Picket How and former byre 54.58619°N 3.30836°W	—	Late 17th century	The former byre has been incorporated into the farmhouse, which is roughcast on a projecting plinth and with a green slate roof. There are two storeys and three bays, with the former byre to the left and a rear extension giving the house a T-shaped plan. Most of the windows are mullioned. There is a doorway, and in the former byre is a sash window, each of which has a shaped lintel.
Low Hollins; 54.59178°N 3.30376°W	—	1687	The former farmhouse is partly stuccoed and partly roughcast with a green slate roof. It has two storeys and four bays, with a lower single-bay extension to the left, and a two-bay extension at the rear. In the ground floor are casement windows, and above are mullioned windows in chamfered surrounds. In the extension is a doorway with a chamfered surround, an inscribed lintel and a hood mould. Inside the house is an inglenook.
Crag House and barn 54.54295°N 3.27919°W	—	Late 17th to early 18th century	The farmhouse and barn are in rubble with a green slate roof. The house has two storeys, four bays, and a gabled stone porch. The windows are sashes, some of which are sliding sashes. The barn to the left has a large cart entrance, a half-plank door, and a loft door.
Palace How; 54.58613°N 3.31308°W	—	Mid to late 18th century	A stuccoed farmhouse with a green slate roof, in two storeys and with four bays. On the front are two plank doors, one with a gabled porch. The windows are sashes.
Low House and barn 54.59039°N 3.30759°W	—	1773	The farmhouse and former barn, now incorporated into the house, are stuccoed with an eaves cornice and a green slate roof. There are two storeys, the main part of the house has three bays, with a single-bay extension at right-angles to the right, and the lower former barn to the left, giving an L-shaped plan. The doorway has pilasters, a fanlight, and a segmental pediment. The windows are sashes in architraves.
Croft Farmhouse; 54.54098°N 3.27706°W		Late 18th or early 19th century	A farmhouse and café, stuccoed on a chamfered plinth, with quoins and a green slate roof. There are two storeys and two bays, with a two-bay extension to the left, and a single-storey, three-bay extension at right-angles to the right. The doorway in the main part has a shaped lintel and a cornice on consoles, and in the extension is a doorway with a simpler shaped lintel. The windows are horizontally sliding sashes.
Millbeck Farmhouse; 54.60074°N 3.29746°W	—	Early 19th century	A stuccoed farmhouse with angle pilasters and a green slate roof with coped gables. There are two storeys and three bays. The windows are sashes, and the doorway has pilasters, a radial fanlight, and a false keystone.
St James' Church; 54.54178°N 3.27514°W		1840	A small church that was extended in 1884 and 1933, It is in stone and slate rubble and has a green slate roof with coped gables. The church consists of a two-bay nave, a west porch, and a single-bay chancel. On the west gable is a twin bellcote, and the windows are lancets.
