= John Hatfield (forger) =

John Hatfield (1758?–1803) was a notorious English forger, bigamist and imposter.

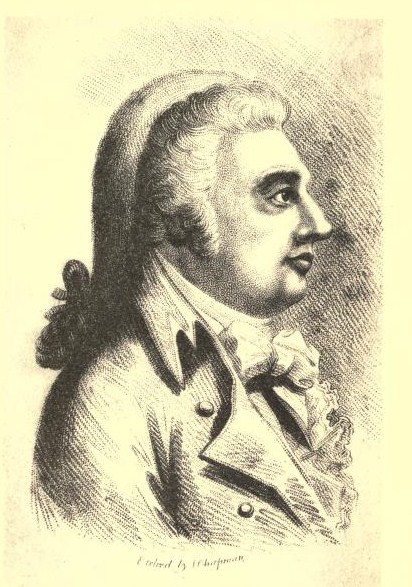
John Hatfield

== Early life ==
Born at Mottram in Longdendale, Cheshire, before 1759, Hatfield became traveller to a linendraper in the North of England about 1772, and paid his addresses to a natural daughter of Lord Robert Manners, who was to receive a dowry if she married with her father's approval. Lord Robert, taken in by Hatfield, assented to his proposal of marriage, and presented him at his wedding with £1,500. Hatfield soon went to London, described himself as a near relation of the Rutland family, and lived in luxury. When the money was spent he disappeared, abandoning his wife (who shortly died) and three daughters.

== Debtor and second marriage ==
After several years' absence Hatfield returned to London in 1782. His career was cut short by his committal to the King's Bench prison for debt. Here he induced a clergyman to lay his case before the Duke of Rutland, who secured his release. When the duke became lord-lieutenant of Ireland in 1784, Hatfield went to Dublin, and by claiming relationship with the viceroy lived for a time on credit. He was soon committed to The Marshalsea, Dublin, when the duke again paid his debts and sent him out of the country.

Hatfield continued a career of imposture until arrested for an hotel bill at Scarborough on 25 April 1792. He remained in the Scarborough gaol for more than seven years, but eventually managed to excite the pity of Miss Nation, a Devonshire lady, who lived with her mother in a house opposite the prison. She paid his debts, and, though she is said never to have spoken to him till he left the gaol, married him next morning (14 September 1800). The pair went to Dulverton in Somersetshire, where by fraudulent representations Hatfield obtained both money and credit. He lived in London once again in magnificent style, and canvassed Queenborough: Members of Parliament had immunity from arrest. Pressed by his creditors, he procured a few hundred pounds and disappeared, leaving his second wife and her young child in Somerset.

== Third marriage ==
In August 1801 Hatfield arrived at Keswick, Cumberland, in a carriage, and impersonated Alexander Augustus Hope, M.P. He spent his time in excursions, and on a visit to Grasmere became acquainted with a Liverpool gentleman named Crump, whose name and credit he then employed when in want of money. By franking letters in his assumed name he silenced suspicion. An intrigue with a lady of fortune came to nothing. But the reputation of Mary Robinson, the "Buttermere Beauty", led him to visit the Fish Inn, Buttermere, where her father was landlord. She was sufficiently well known to be mentioned in a guide book of 1792, by Joseph Palmer. Finding that Mary's family had some means, Hatfield married her at Lorton Church on 2 October 1802.

Newspapers reported the marriage of the "Buttermere Beauty" to a member of the aristocracy, and the Earl of Hopetoun, the head of the Hope family, made it known that the real Colonel Hope was then in Vienna. After his wedding Hatfield set out for Scotland, but in four or five days returned with Mary to her father's house. George Hardinge, a judge in Wales, who knew Colonel Hope, went to Keswick, and invited Hatfield to visit him; Hatfield was introduced to Hardinge by one of his creditors. Hatfield then asserted that his name was Hope, but that he was not the member for Linlithgow. A warrant was made out, and he was placed in custody.

Hatfield treated the matter as a mistake, and managed to escape from his custodians. In November a reward of £50 was offered for his apprehension, and a description was circulated.

== Arrest, trial and execution ==
Hatfield was taken at a village sixteen miles from Swansea soon after. His trial took place at Carlisle on 15 August 1803. To three indictments for forgery Hatfield pleaded not guilty. But the charges were fully proved. He was sentenced to be hanged, and met his death coolly, on Saturday, 3 September. Mary Robinson and her false lover were the subject at the time of novels, verses, dramas, and tales. At the time, Samuel Taylor Coleridge gave wide publicity to the elopement of John and Mary, in five articles for The Morning Post. Coleridge also visited Hatfield as a condemned man, while travelling through Carlisle with Dorothy Wordsworth and William Wordsworth.
