= Listed buildings in Brigham, Cumbria =

Brigham is a civil parish in the Cumberland district in Cumbria, England. It contains 16 listed buildings that are recorded in the National Heritage List for England. Of these, one is listed at Grade I, the highest of the three grades, one is at Grade II*, the middle grade, and the others are at Grade II, the lowest grade. The parish contains the village of Brigham and surrounding countryside. The listed buildings include a church and a sundial in the churchyard, houses and associated structures, farmhouses and farm buildings, milestones, a bridge, a war memorial, and a cattle pound.

== Key ==
Grade	Criteria
I	Buildings of exceptional interest, sometimes considered to be internationally important
II*	Particularly important buildings of more than special interest
II	Buildings of national importance and special interest

== Buildings ==
Name and location	Photograph	Date	Notes	Grade
St Bridget's Church; 54.66506°N 3.41896°W		Late 11th century	The church was altered in each of the following three centuries, and restored in 1863–76 by William Butterfield. It is in calciferous sandstone and has green slate roofs with coped gables, cross finials and shaped ridge tiles. The church consists of a west tower, a nave with a south aisle, a south porch, and a chancel with a north vestry. The tower is in three stages and it has a saddleback roof.	I
Parsonage Farmhouse; 54.66563°N 3.41889°W	—	13th or 14th century	Originally a vicarage, and later used as a farmhouse, it was altered in the 19th and 20th centuries. The house has thick roughcast walls and a Welsh slate roof, and has two storeys and three bays. Its remaining medieval features include a pointed window arch and two corbels flanking the porch. Later features include sash windows, some of which are horizontally sliding, and a stone porch.	II*
Sundial; 54.66479°N 3.41886°W	—	1684	The sundial is in the churchyard of St Bridget's Church. It is in red sandstone, and has a shaft with chamfered and moulded angles. On one face is the date, and the sundial is on the other face. The gnomon is missing.	II
Midtown Farmhouse and barns 54.65991°N 3.41427°W	—	Early 18th century	The farmhouse and barns, one on each side, are roughcast with green slate roofs. The house has two storeys and three bays. The barn on the left shares a common roof with the house, and the right barn is lower. The doorway has an architrave. Most of the windows are sashes, and there is also a casement window and two fire windows. (Note: Street View in May 2009 shows that the barns have been converted for domestic use.)	II
Brigham Hall; 54.65911°N 3.41827°W	—	Mid 18th century	A pebbledashed farmhouse with quoins and a green slate roof. It has two storeys and five bays. The doorway has a shaped head, and the windows are sashes.	II
Gate posts, 81 High Brigham; 54.65918°N 3.41834°W	—	Mid 18th century	A pair of gate piers in pebbledashed stone with a square plan. They have shaped caps and ball finials.	II
114 High Brigham and former barn 54.65980°N 3.41913°W	—	Late 18th or early 19th century	The house and former barn are stuccoed with green slate roofs. The house has an eaves cornice, quoins, two storeys, and three bays. The doorway has an architrave and a pediment, and the windows are sashes, also with architraves. The barn to the right is lower and recessed; it contains a doorway, a garage door, a sash window, a casement window, and an oval vent.	II
126 High Brigham; 54.65961°N 3.41961°W	—	Late 18th or early 19th century	A rendered house with quoins and a green slate roof. It has two storeys and three bays, with a single-bay extension to the left. The doorway has a quoined surround, and the windows are sashes.	II
Cattle pound 54.65696°N 3.41012°W	—	Early 19th century	The cattle pound is in calciferous sandstone. It consists of a low dry stone wall enclosing a roughly rectangular area.	II
Milestone, Broughton Cross; 54.65975°N 3.43204°W	—	Early 19th century	The milestone was provided for the Cockermouth to Workington Turnpike road. It has a rounded top and is inscribed on the front with the distances in miles to Cockermouth and to Workington.	II
Milestone, Eller Ridge Cottage; 54.66526°N 3.41063°W	—	Early 19th century	The milestone was provided for the Cockermouth to Workington Turnpike road. It has a rounded top and is inscribed on the front with the distances in miles to Cockermouth and to Workington.	II
Old Vicarage; 54.66525°N 3.41511°W	—	Early 19th century	A rendered house with gable cross finials and a green slate roof. It has two storeys and three bays. The central porch leads to double doors above which is a fanlight. The windows are sashes with chamfered surrounds and hood moulds.	II
Wall and gate piers, Old Vicarage; 54.66453°N 3.41466°W	—	Early 19th century	The wall and gate piers are in calciferous sandstone. The wall is low and serpentine shaped, with saddleback coping. The gate piers are square and rusticated and have pyramidal caps.	II
Broughton High Bridge; 54.66821°N 3.42545°W		1835	A road bridge carrying Great Boughton over the River Derwent, it is in rusticated calciferous sandstone, and consists of three segmental arches. The arches have voussoirs, and are carried on round piers. The bridge has solid parapets with chamfered coping.	II
Ellerlea; 54.65953°N 3.41296°W	—	Mid 19th century	A stuccoed house with an eaves cornice, angle pilasters, and a green slate roof. There are two storeys and three bays. The central doorway has a fanlight and an Ionic doorcase, flanked by single-storey canted bay windows. Above the doorway is a round-headed sash window, and the other upper floor windows are casements.	II
War memorial 54.66492°N 3.41883°W		1921	The war memorial is in the churchyard of St Bridget's Church. It is in red Aberdeen granite, and consists of a cross on a short shaft, on a tapering plinth and a base, both rough-hewn and with a polished front face. The front faces carry inscriptions and the names of those lost in the two World Wars. The memorial stands in a five-sided area surrounded by a granite kerb.	II

== Notes and references ==
=== Sources ===
- Historic England, "Church of St Bridget, Brigham (1145196)", National Heritage List for England
- Historic England, "Parsonage Farmhouse, Brigham (1145197)", National Heritage List for England
- Historic England, "Sundial south of Church of St Bridget, Brigham (1311963)", National Heritage List for England
- Historic England, "Midtown Farmhouse and adjoining barns, Brigham (1311973)", National Heritage List for England
- Historic England, "Brigham Hall, Brigham (1145201)", National Heritage List for England
- Historic England, "Gate posts in front of No. 81 High Brigham, Brigham (1138190)", National Heritage List for England
- Historic England, "No. 114 High Brigham and adjoining former barn, Brigham (1326856)", National Heritage List for England
- Historic England, "No. 126 High Brigham, Brigham (1138185)", National Heritage List for England
- Historic England, "Cattle pound at High Ellerbeck Bridge, Brigham (1145199)", National Heritage List for England
- Historic England, "Milestone east of Broughton Cross, Brigham (1138156)", National Heritage List for England
- Historic England, "Milestone outside of Eller Ridge Cottage, Brigham (1145202)", National Heritage List for England
- Historic England, "The Old Vicarage, Brigham (1326857)", National Heritage List for England
- Historic England, "Wall and gate piers at entrance to The Old Vicarage, Brigham (1138198)", National Heritage List for England
- Historic England, "Broughton High Bridge, Brigham (1138171)", National Heritage List for England
- Historic England, "Ellerlea, Brigham (1145200)", National Heritage List for England
- Historic England, "Brigham War Memorial, Brigham (1457578)", National Heritage List for England
- Historic England, Listed Buildings
- Hyde, Matthew; Pevsner, Nikolaus (2010) [1967], Cumbria, The Buildings of England, New Haven and London: Yale University Press, ISBN 978-0-300-12663-1
