= Mosser =

Village in Cumbria, England

Coordinates: 54.612741°N 3.3718601°W

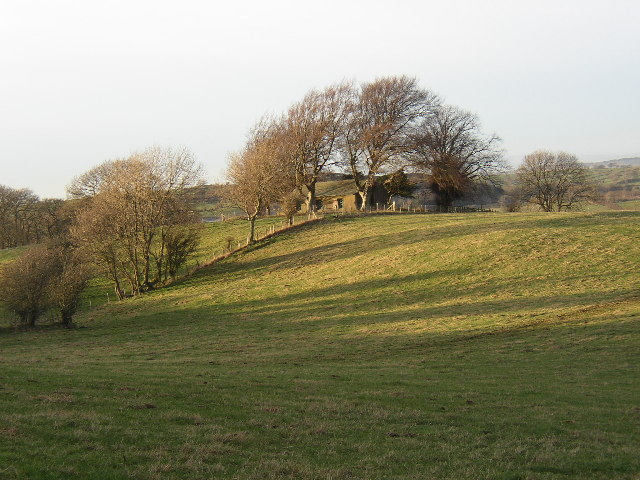
- View towards St Michael's Church on the hillside

- Location within Cumbria
- Civil parish: Blindbothel
- Unitary authority: Cumberland
- Ceremonial county: Cumbria
- Region: North West
- Country: England
- Sovereign state: United Kingdom
- Post town: COCKERMOUTH
- Police: Cumbria
- Fire: Cumbria
- Ambulance: North West

Mosser is a village in the civil parish of Blindbothel, in the Cumberland district of Cumbria, England. It lies 26 miles (42 km) south-west of Carlisle and 3.6 miles (5.8 km) south of Cockermouth, and is within the boundaries of the Lake District National Park.

== History ==
The name "Mosser" means 'Moss shieling', in the sense of a peat bog.

Mosser was historically a township in the ancient parish of Brigham in the historic county of Cumberland. The township took on civil functions under the poor laws from the 17th century onwards. As such, the township also became a civil parish in 1866, when the legal definition of 'parish' was changed to be the areas used for administering the poor laws.

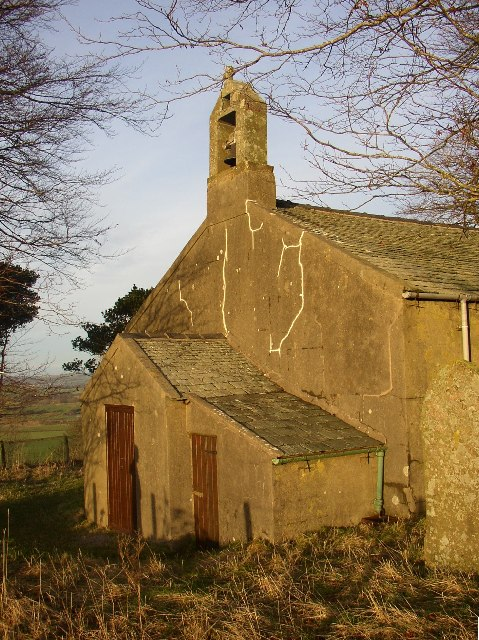
St Michael's, also known as the Fell Church

A chapel of ease dedicated to St Philip existed at Mosser from medieval times. It had fallen into ruins by the late 17th century, but was rebuilt in 1773. An ecclesiastical parish of Mosser was created in 1883, covering the townships of Mosser, Blindbothel, Eaglesfield and part of Whinfell. The old church of St Philip initially served as the parish church. A new church, also dedicated to St Philip, was built in the Eaglesfield township in 1891; it is called St Philip, Mosser, by reference to the ecclesiastical parish it serves, despite not being in the old Mosser township.

The old chapel at Mosser was subsequently rededicated to St Michael and is now also known as the Fell Church.

The civil parish of Mosser was abolished in 1934 and its area incorporated into the civil parish of Blindbothel. In 1931 (the last census before the parish was abolished), Mosser had a population of 56.

On 28 February 2018 there was a 3.2 magnitude earthquake of which Mosser was at the epicentre.
