= Brackenthwaite, Westward =

Settlement in Cumbria, England

Coordinates: 54.80°N 03.10°W

Brackenthwaite
- Location in Allerdale, Cumbria Location within Cumbria
- OS grid reference: NY2946
- Civil parish: Westward
- Unitary authority: Cumberland
- Ceremonial county: Cumbria
- Region: North West
- Country: England
- Sovereign state: United Kingdom
- Post town: WIGTON
- Postcode district: CA7
- Dialling code: 01697
- Police: Cumbria
- Fire: Cumbria
- Ambulance: North West
- UK Parliament: Penrith and Solway

Brackenthwaite is a settlement situated some 3 miles (4.8 km) south-east of the town of Wigton in the English county of Cumbria. It should not be confused with the identically named settlement of Brackenthwaite that is situated some 6 miles (9.7 km) south of Cockermouth in the same county.

For administrative purposes, Brackenthwaite lies within the civil parish of Westward, the Cumberland unitary authority area, and the county of Cumbria. It is within the Penrith and Solway constituency of the United Kingdom Parliament.

== Toponymy ==
Bracanethuaite 12th Century. Old Norse brakni 'bush' and thveit 'assart' like Bregentved (Denmark) and Bracquetuit (Normandy).
