= Buttermere, Cumbria (village) =

Village and civil parish in England

Coordinates: 54.542°N 3.276°W

Buttermere
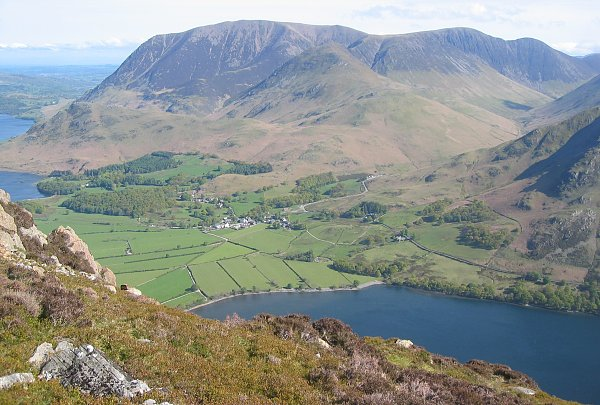
- Buttermere village (centre), with Grasmoor (above), Buttermere lake (below), and Crummock Water (left).

- Location within Cumbria
- Population: 92 (Parish, 2021)
- OS grid reference: NY174170
- Civil parish: Buttermere
- Unitary authority: Cumberland
- Ceremonial county: Cumbria
- Region: North West
- Country: England
- Sovereign state: United Kingdom
- Post town: COCKERMOUTH
- Postcode district: CA13
- Dialling code: 017687
- Police: Cumbria
- Fire: Cumbria
- Ambulance: North West
- UK Parliament: Penrith and Solway

Buttermere is a village and civil parish in the Cumberland district of Cumbria, England. It lies within the Lake District National Park.

== Village ==
The village of Buttermere lies between the lakes of Buttermere and Crummock Water, and is overlooked by the summits of Grasmoor to the north and High Stile to the south. The nearest towns are Keswick and Cockermouth, both of which are approximately 10 miles (16 km) away.

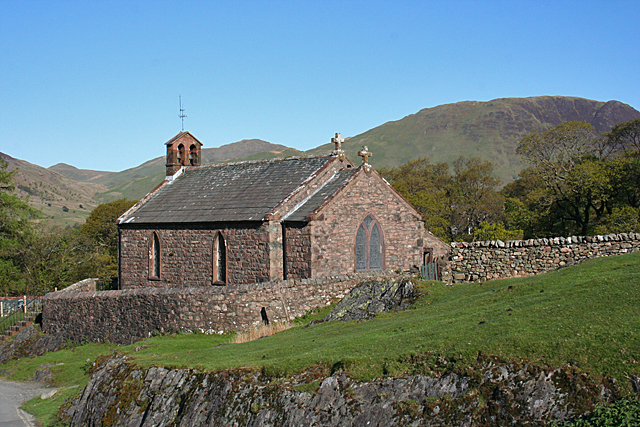
St James's Church

Buttermere church is dedicated to St James, and dates from 1840, replacing a chapel which was dedicated in 1507. It has a memorial plaque to Alfred Wainwright, in the sill of a window with a view of Haystacks where his ashes were scattered. It is Grade II listed.

In the village, The Bridge Hotel, stands on a site dating back to the 11th century, where an armoury and a bakery stood, in connection with the Water-Mill Earl Boether built higher up the stream. For seven centuries the mill worked continuously, the buildings being many times renewed. Circa 1734, the buildings were sold to the church, the curate being the Reverend Robert Walker. He obtained a beer licence and originated the Bridge Inn. In 1837, Jonathan Thomas Sleap purchased the property, rebuilding the inn using stone obtained from the old water will. He changed the name to 'Victoria' upon the visit by Queen Victoria in 1850. In 1861, H Cooper inherited the property incorporating the bay windows, but it was the author Nicholas Size, who in 1920 extended and improved the building. Upon his death the new owner changed the name to 'The Bridge'.

The Fish Inn was the home of Mary Robinson, known as the Maid of Buttermere, when her father was its landlord. It kept this name until 2019, and is now called the Buttermere Court Hotel.

Buttermere is situated on the B5289 road that runs beside Crummock Water and along the valley of the River Cocker north to Cockermouth. In the other direction, the B5289 runs via the steep Honister Pass, to Borrowdale and Keswick. A more direct, but more minor, road crosses the nearby Newlands Pass into the Newlands Valley and hence to Keswick.

== Civil parish ==
The civil parish of Buttermere covers a considerable area around the village, including both Buttermere and Crummock Water lakes, the summit of Grasmoor, the north side of High Stile and the western side of Honister Pass. The smaller settlements of Brackenthwaite, to the north of Crummock Water, and Gatesgarth, at the foot of the Honister Pass, are included. The parish lies entirely within the Lake District National Park.

== Governance ==
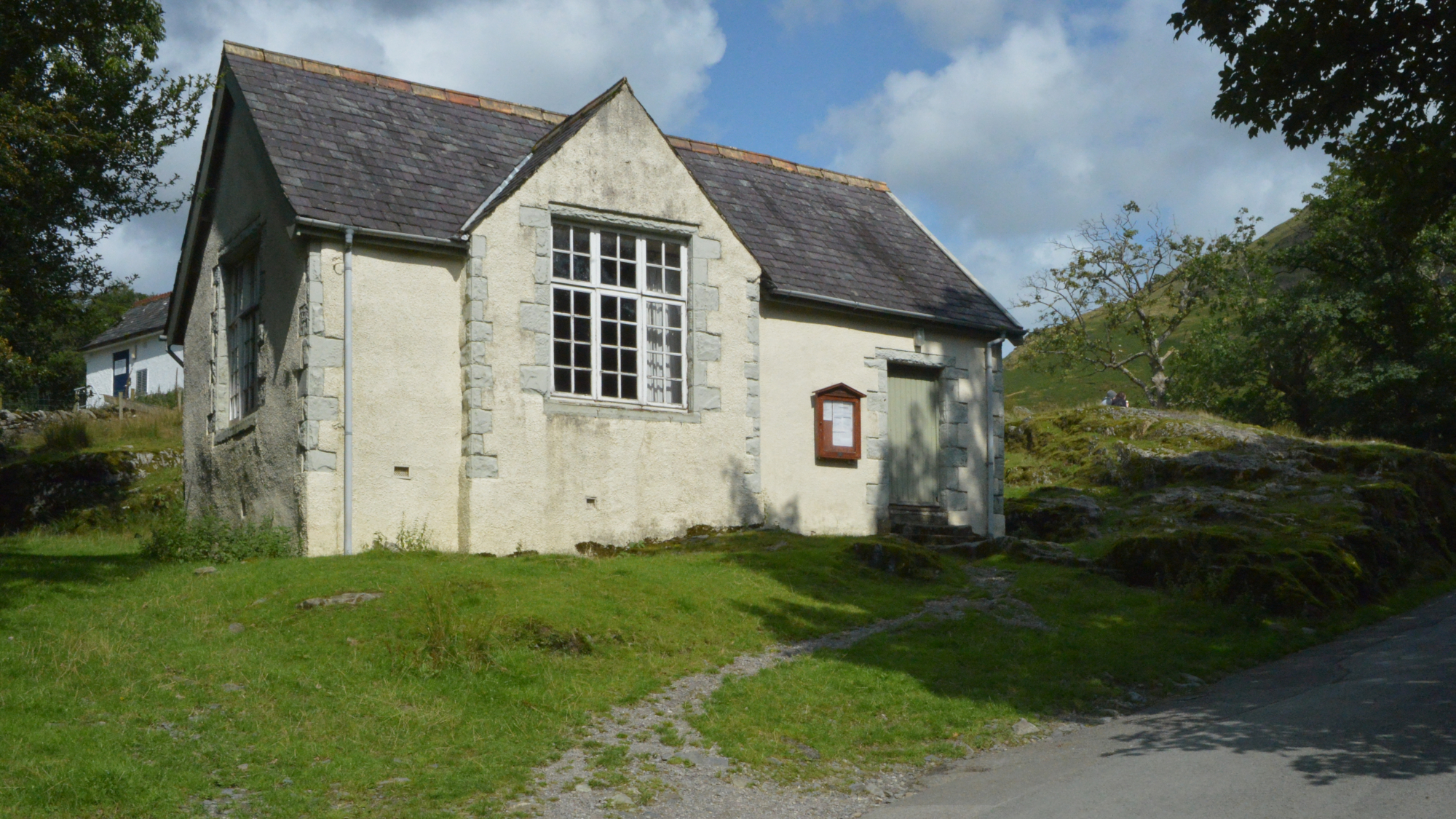
Old School Room

There are two tiers of local government covering Buttermere, at parish and unitary authority level: Buttermere Parish Council and Cumberland Council. The parish council meets at the Old School Room. The parish is wholly within the Lake District National Park, and so some functions are administered by the Lake District National Park Authority, notably planning. The parish council works in partnership with the three neighbouring parishes of Blindbothel, Lorton, and Loweswater as the Melbreak Communities, particularly to respond to issues of flooding along the River Cocker.

The parish is within the Penrith and Solway constituency for elections to the United Kingdom Parliament.

=== Administrative history ===
Buttermere was historically a township in the ancient parish of Brigham, in the historic county of Cumberland. The parish of Brigham was large, and its four south-eastern townships of Brackenthwaite, Buttermere, Lorton and Wythop were served by a chapel of ease at Lorton. Buttermere's church of St James was a subordinate chapel to the one at Lorton.

The township of Buttermere took on civil functions under the poor laws from the 17th century onwards. As such, the township also became a civil parish in 1866, when the legal definition of 'parish' was changed to be the areas used for administering the poor laws. The parish of Buttermere was included in the Cockermouth Rural District from 1894. It was enlarged in 1934 to take in the area of the abolished neighbouring parish of Brackenthwaite.

Cockermouth Rural District was abolished in 1974, becoming part of the borough of Allerdale in the new county of Cumbria. Allerdale was in turn abolished in 2023 when the new Cumberland Council was created, also taking over the functions of the abolished Cumbria County Council in the area.

== Demography ==
At the 2021 census, the population of the parish was 92. The population had been 127 at the 2001 census, and 121 at the 2011 census.

== Transport ==
A free bus operates between Buttermere and Cockermouth with five return services per day.

== Famous residents ==
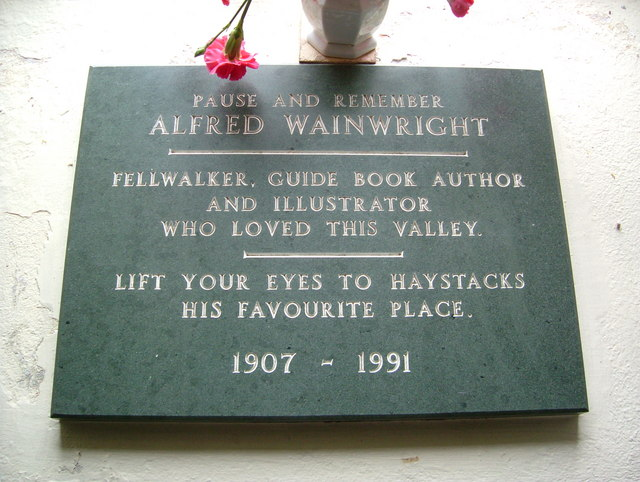
Plaque to Alfred Wainwright in Buttermere Church

- Mary Robinson (1778–1837) — known as "The Maid of Buttermere" and the subject of writings by Samuel Taylor Coleridge, William Wordsworth, Charles Lamb and, more recently, Melvyn Bragg's novel of that name.
- Economic historian Arthur Cecil Pigou (1877—1959) lived at Lower Gatesgarth and hosted many of his friends at the house.

== See also ==
- Listed buildings in Buttermere, Cumbria
