= Gatesgarth =

Settlement in Cumbria, England

Coordinates: 54.523622°N 3.246202°W

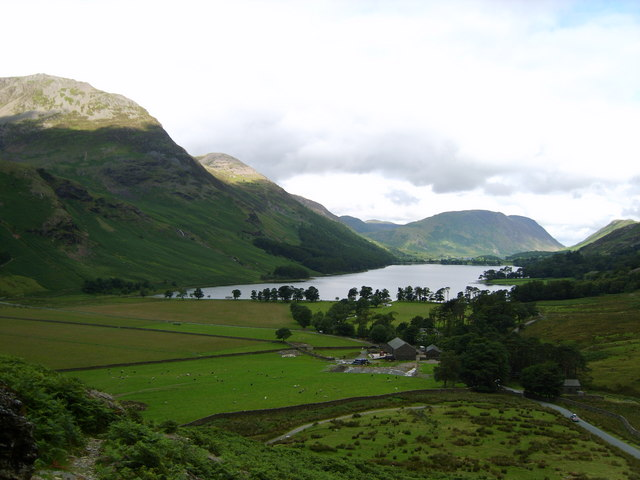
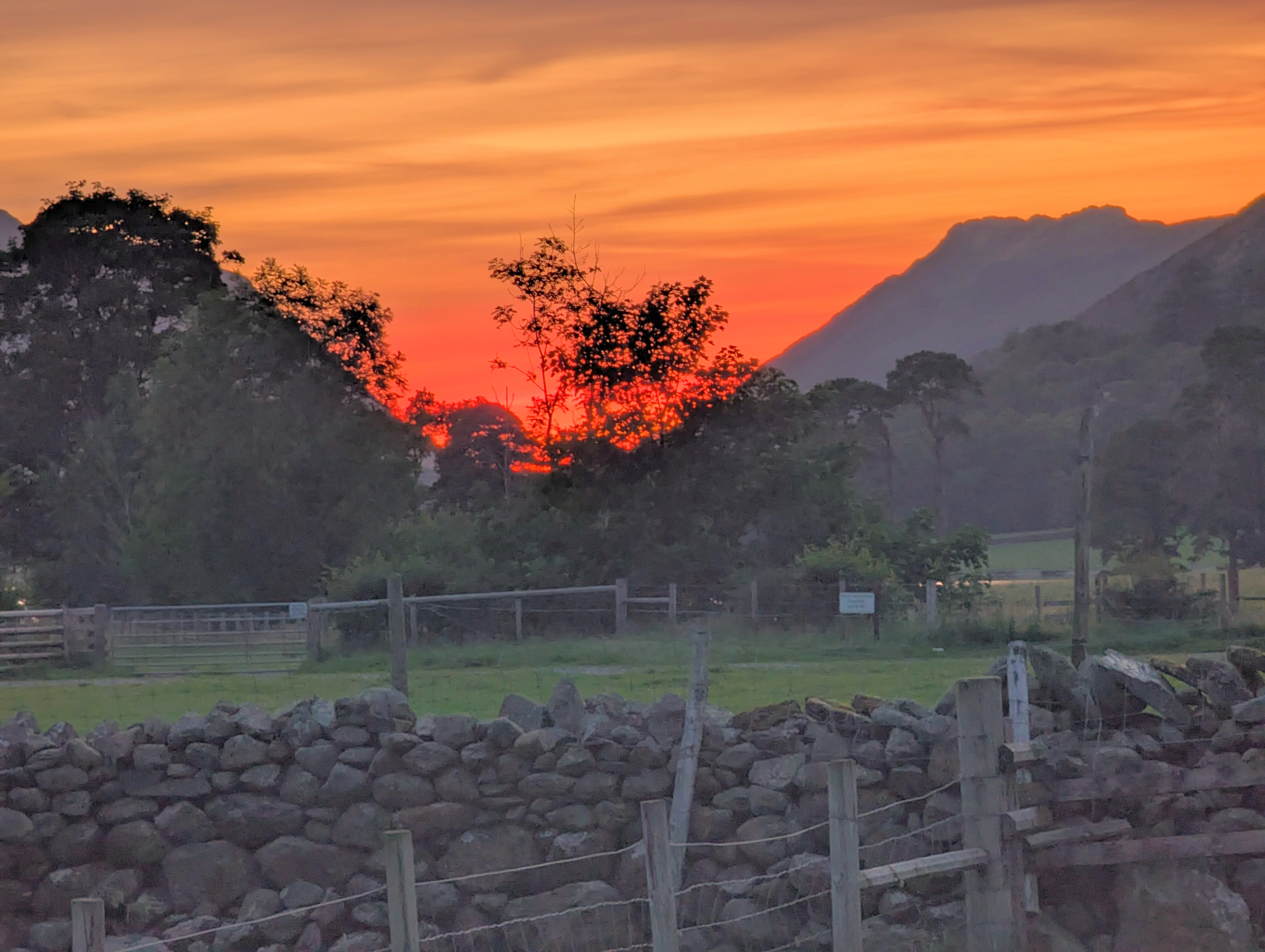
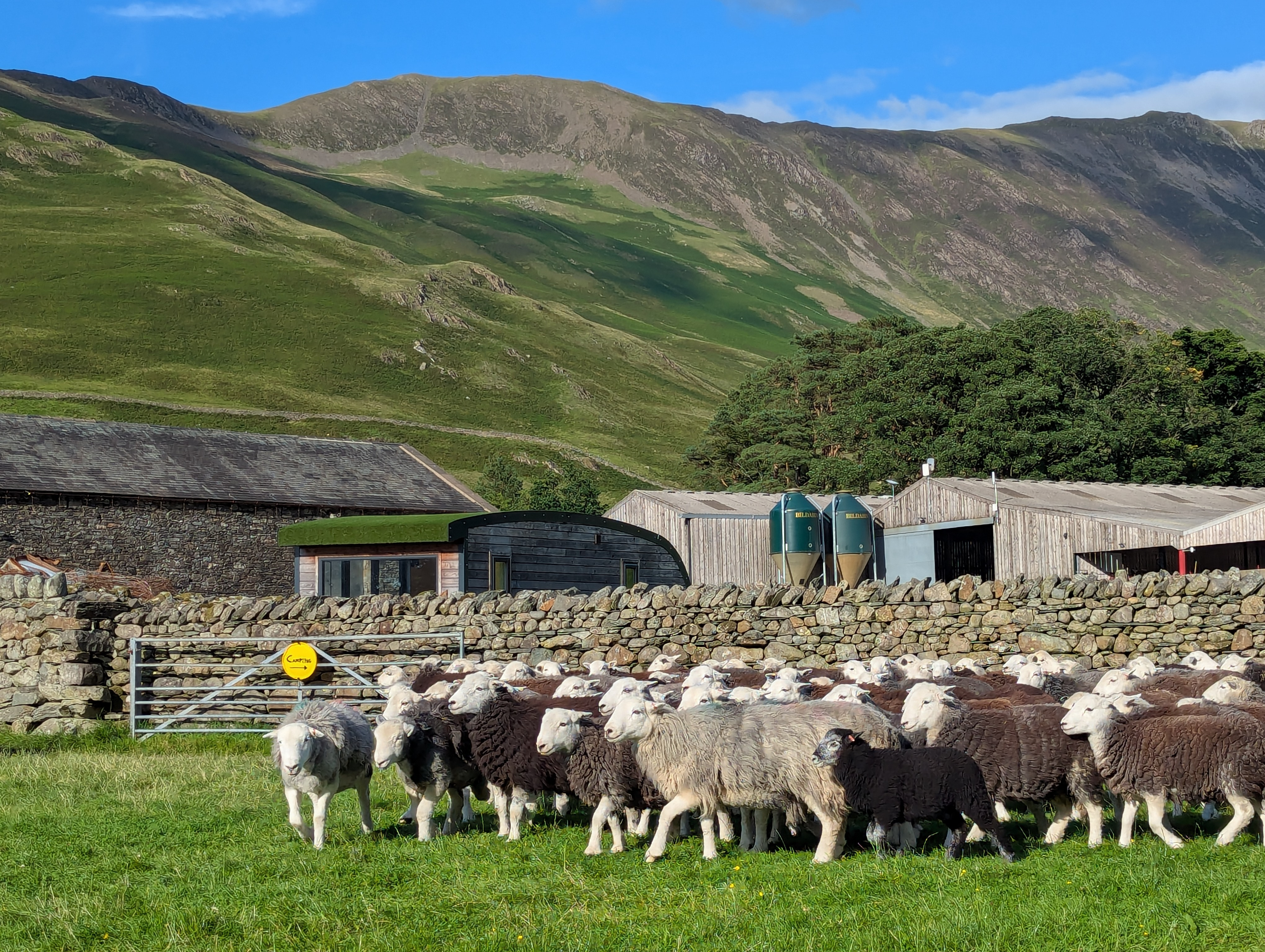
- Gatesgarth seen from Low Raven Crag Sunset, July 25 Sheep on Gates Garth farm, Cockermouth,

- Location in Allerdale, Cumbria Location within Cumbria
- OS grid reference: NY193149
- Civil parish: Buttermere
- Unitary authority: Cumberland
- Ceremonial county: Cumbria
- Region: North West
- Country: England
- Sovereign state: United Kingdom
- Post town: COCKERMOUTH
- Postcode district: CA13
- Dialling code: 017687
- Police: Cumbria
- Fire: Cumbria
- Ambulance: North West
- UK Parliament: Penrith and Solway

Gatesgarth is a settlement in Lake District of England. It is situated to the east of the lake of Buttermere, on the B5289 road on its western approach to the Honister Pass.

For administrative purposes, Gatesgarth lies within the civil parish of Buttermere, the unitary authority of Cumberland, and the county of Cumbria. It is within the Penrith and Solway constituency of the United Kingdom Parliament.
