= Listed buildings in Greysouthen =

Greysouthen is a civil parish in the Cumberland district in Cumbria, England. It contains seven listed buildings that are recorded in the National Heritage List for England. All the listed buildings are designated at Grade II, the lowest of the three grades, which is applied to "buildings of national importance and special interest". The parish contains the village of Greysouthen and surrounding countryside. The listed buildings consist of houses, farmhouses, farm buildings, and a milestone.

== Buildings ==
Name and location	Photograph	Date	Notes
Milestone; 54.65256°N 3.45425°W	—	Late 18th or early 19th century	The milestone has a rounded top. It has a cast iron plate inscribed with the distances in miles to Workington and to Cockermouth.
The Mansion and No. 20 Main Street; 54.64887°N 3.44064°W	—	c. 1805	A house with adjoining servants' quarters, stuccoed, with angle pilasters, an eaves cornice, and a green slate roof. The main house has two storeys and nine bays, with a lower two-storey four-bay house. There is a porch with Tuscan columns, and the windows are sashes. At the rear, facing Main Street, is a doorcase with pilasters flanked by stained glass windows.
Lodge; 54.64776°N 3.44427°W	—	Early 19th century	The lodge is stuccoed, with angle pilasters, an eaves cornice, and a green slate hipped roof. It is in a single storey and has three bays and a tow-storey two-bay extension at the rear. There is a canted bay window, and the other windows are sashes.
Observatory; 54.65344°N 3.43769°W	—	Early 19th century	The observatory, is in the grounds of Tarn Bank, and is in calciferous sandstone on a rusticated plinth with a dentilled cornice. It has a circular plan and a lead-domed cupola. The observatory is in a single storey, and has a rectangular porch, a doorway with pilasters, and narrow tall round-arched windows.
Overend House and barn 54.65183°N 3.43376°W	—	Early 19th century	The house and barn are roughcast with Welsh slate roofs. The house has two storeys and three bays with a lower single-bay extension to the right, and a right-angled barn The door has a fanlight, and the windows are sashes. In the extension is a re-set lintel.
Tarn Bank; 54.65382°N 3.43727°W	—	Early 19th century	A house in calciferous sandstone on a chamfered plinth, with angle pilasters, an eaves cornice, and a hipped green slate roof. There are two storeys and three bays, a single-storey three-bay wing to the right, and extensions to the rear. There is a porch with two columns, and the windows are sashes.
Mayfield; 54.63184°N 3.44649°W	—	1845	A roughcast farmhouse with angle pilasters and a green slate roof. It has two storeys and three bays, with a folly battlemented tower to the right. The windows are sashes with hood moulds.
