= Mary Robinson (Maid of Buttermere) =

Inn-keeper's daughter in Cumbria, England (1778–1837)

Mary Robinson (1778 – 7 February 1837, married name Mary Harrison), known as "The Maid of Buttermere", was an inn-keeper's daughter from Buttermere, Cumbria, England, who was deceived into a bigamous marriage. She is mentioned in William Wordsworth's "The Prelude".

== Life ==
Robinson was a shepherdess and the daughter of the landlord of the Fish Inn in the village of Buttermere in England's Lake District. She was married bigamously in 1802 to John Hatfield (c.1758–1803), who presented himself as "Colonel Hope". The marriage of the celebrated local beauty to the brother of an earl (as he claimed) was widely reported, and Samuel Taylor Coleridge wrote in the London Morning Post of "The romantic marriage". Hatfield was exposed as an impostor, bigamist and forger, was arrested, escaped, was captured in South Wales, and was tried at Carlisle for forgery and hanged in 1803. Mary's story captured the public imagination, and subscriptions were raised on her behalf. She married a local farmer Richard Harrison in 1807 and had four children. Her death was mentioned in The Annual Register and she is buried in the churchyard at St Kentigern's Church at Caldbeck (St Kentigern is also known as St Mungo).

== Depictions ==
Robinson is mentioned in William Wordsworth's "The Prelude". He describes her as an "artless daughter of the hills" of "modest mien / And carriage marked by unexampled grace", and says that after death "She lives in peace / Upon the spot where she was born and reared / Without contamination doth she live / In quietness, without anxiety."

She is the subject of Melvyn Bragg's 1987 novel The Maid of Buttermere, which was adapted into a play by Lisa Evans and premiered at Keswick's Theatre by the Lake in 2009.
