= Listed buildings in Blindbothel =

Blindbothel is a civil parish in the Cumberland district in Cumbria, England. It contains eleven listed buildings that are recorded in the National Heritage List for England. All the listed buildings are designated at Grade II, the lowest of the three grades, which is applied to "buildings of national importance and special interest". The parish is almost entirely rural, and most of the listed buildings are houses, cottages, farmhouses, and farm buildings dating from the 17th and 18th centuries. The other listed buildings are a church and a bridge.

== Buildings ==
Name and location	Photograph	Date	Notes
Whinfell Hall; 54.61682°N 3.31817°W	—	Late 17th century	Originally a farmhouse, later a private house, most of the building dates from the mid-19th century. Both parts are roughcast with green slate roofs and sash windows. The older part has a blocked chamfered doorway with an inscribed lintel and a blocked chamfered window. The newer part is in two storeys and has three bays. It has a doorway with a Tuscan porch and a fanlight.
Littlethwaite Farmhouse and barn 54.60910°N 3.31796°W	—	Early 18th century	The farmhouse and barn are roughcast over slate rubble. The roof is in green slate at the front, and is tiled at the rear. The house has two storeys and three bays, with a central doorway and mullioned windows. At the rear is an overall outshut.
Toddell Cottage and former barn 54.62499°N 3.36150°W	—	Early 18th century	The cottage and former barn are roughcast with a green slate roof. There are two storeys and five bays with the former barn to the right. Some of the windows are horizontally sliding sashes, and others are casements.
Toddell Farmhouse and barn 54.62503°N 3.36122°W	—	Early 18th century	The farmhouse and barn have a green slate roof. The house is stuccoed with angle pilasters, and has two storeys and three bays. Most of the windows are sashes, and there is one double casement window. The barn, to the right, is roughcast on slate rubble, and has doorways under a slate canopy.
Brandlingill Farmhouse; 54.62614°N 3.36114°W	—	1735	The farmhouse, later a private house, was extended in the late 18th century. It is roughcast with a green slate roof and is in two storeys. Originally with two bays, the extension added two bays to the left. The windows are sashes, those in the original part having architraves.
Underwood and barn 54.61014°N 3.38172°W	—	1742	A farmhouse and a barn, the latter being altered in 1925. Both are roughcast, the house has a green slate roof, and the barn a roof of Welsh slate. The house has two storeys and three bays, with an extension at the rear, and the barn to the left. It has sash windows with architraves, and a doorway with pilasters and a segmental hood. The barn has plank doors, some under a segmental arch, one with an inscribed lintel, and ventilation slits.
St Michael's Church; 54.61073°N 3.37288°W		1773	A small church standing on a medieval site that was restored in 1925. It is in rendered slate rubble and has a green slate roof with coped gables. The church consists of a combined nave and chancel, with a west porch and a gabled bellcote. Its furnishings include a 12th-century font on a 19th-century pedestal.
Gill Brow Cottage; 54.61314°N 3.37087°W	—	Late 18th century	A farmhouse with slate rubble walls and a green slate roof. It is in two storeys and two bays with a protruding extension to the left. In the extension is a casement window, and the other windows are sashes.
Low Bank Farmhouse; 54.62141°N 3.32230°W	—	Late 18th century	A rendered farmhouse with quoins and a green slate roof. It has two storeys and three bays, a central doorway, and sash windows with architraves. At the rear is a round-headed stair window and a lean-to porch.
Gill Brow and barn 54.61294°N 3.37122°W	—	1785	A farmhouse and barn that are roughcast and with green slate roofs. The house has two storeys and three bays, with a further bay to the right. The doorway has a fanlight, and most of the windows are sashes, with casements in the right bay. To the left is an L-shaped barn with doorways, a cart entrance with a segmental arch, and casement windows.
Lorton Low Bridge; 54.61880°N 3.31503°W	—	Early 19th century	The bridge carries a road over the River Cocker. It is in slate rubble with a sandstone parapet, and consists of two segmental arches with a splayed cutwater. The parapet is solid and has saddle-back coping.
