= Listed buildings in Embleton, Cumbria =

Embleton is a civil parish in the Cumberland district of Cumbria, England. It contains 14 listed buildings that are recorded in the National Heritage List for England. All the listed buildings are designated at Grade II, the lowest of the three grades, which is applied to "buildings of national importance and special interest". The parish contains the village of Embleton and the settlement of Wythop Mill, and is otherwise rural. Most of the listed buildings are houses, farmhouses and farm buildings. The other listed buildings are a public house, a boundary stone, and two milestones.

== Buildings ==
Name and location	Photograph	Date	Notes
Shatton Lodge Farmhouse; 54.64235°N 3.32607°W	—	Early or mid 17th century	The farmhouse is stuccoed, it has a green slate roof, and is in two storeys and seven bays. The doorway has an architrave with a plain frieze and a cornice. Some of the windows are mullioned, and in some windows the mullions have been replaced by small-pane windows. There are continuous hood moulds on both floors. On the right return are sash windows, and inside the house is a blocked inglenook.
Shatton Hall; 54.64083°N 3.32192°W	—	Mid 17th century (probable)	Originally a farmhouse, and later a private house, it was extended in 1701 and again in the 19th century. It is roughcast and has a green slate roof with a coped gable. There are two storeys and three bays, with a two-bay extension to the right, and a right-angled two-bay extension to the left. The doorway has an architrave and a hood mould. Most of the windows are sashes, and there are also oval fire windows, and a canted bay window in the extension.
Wythop Mill Cottage and stables 54.65423°N 3.27466°W	—	Mid 17th century	The cottage has been altered, incorporating the former stables; it is roughcast over rubble with a green slate roof. It has two storeys and two bays, with the former stables to the left. The windows are a mix of sashes and casements.
Stanger House; 54.63757°N 3.33925°W	—	1695	The house was altered in the 19th century. It is rendered with a green slate roof, and has two storeys and three bays, with a further two bays to the right. The windows are sashes in chamfered surrounds. In the left return is a dated lintel.
Blue Bell Inn; 54.66161°N 3.29173°W	—	Early 18th century	A public house that was altered in the late 19th century. It is roughcast with applied timber-framing, and has a green slate roof. There are two storeys and four bays, and the windows are casements.
Close Farmhouse and barn 54.66546°N 3.26873°W	—	Early 18th century	The farmhouse and barn are roughcast with green slate roofs. The house has two storeys and three bays, with a four-bay stable conversion to the right, and a right-angled barn to the left. In the original part of the house are two mullioned windows and a fire window, the other windows being sashes. In the barn are plank doors.
Scales Farmhouse and barn 54.66013°N 3.30459°W	—	Early 18th century	The farmhouse and barn are roughcast with a green slate roof. The house has two storeys and four bays, and a doorway with a bolection architrave and an open segmental pediment. The windows are sashes. The barn is right-angled to the right, and has an extension in mixed slate rubble. In the barn are plank doors, a loft door, and ventilation slits.
Stanley Hall; 54.66151°N 3.29185°W	—	Early 18th century	A roughcast house with a green slate roof in two storeys and two bays, with a single-bay single-story outhouse on the right. Only one mullioned window has survived, the others being sashes or casements. At the rear is an original studded plank door.
High Side and barn 54.64524°N 3.29816°W	—	1771	The farmhouse incorporates parts of an earlier building, and the barn is dated 1747; both have roofs of green slate. The farmhouse is stuccoed, it has two storeys and three bays, and contains a panelled door and sash windows. The barn at a lower level to the left, and has plank doors and a large cart entry. Inside the house is a blocked inglenook.
Shatton Lodge; 54.64248°N 3.32679°W	—	Late 18th century	The house was altered and extended in the 19th century. It is roughcast with quoins, eaves modillions, and a green slate roof that has a coped gable with bargeboards. The house has two storeys and five bays, with a 19th-century extension on the left. There is a panelled door, and sash windows with hood moulds, and in the roof are three gabled dormers.
Milestone, Blue Bell Inn; 54.66184°N 3.29226°W	—	Early 19th century	The milestone was provided for the Cockermouth to Keswick Turnpike road. It has a shaped top, and a cast iron plate on the front inscribed with the distances in miles to Cockermouth and to Keswick.
Milestone, Close Farmhouse; 54.66514°N 3.26839°W	—	Early 19th century	The milestone was provided for the Cockermouth to Keswick Turnpike road. It has a shaped top, and a cast iron plate on the front inscribed with the distances in miles to Cockermouth and to Keswick.
Mill House; 54.65428°N 3.27482°W	—	Early 19th century	The house is in mixed slate rubble with a green slate roof. It has two storeys and two bays. The central doorway has a fanlight, and the windows are sashes.
Boundary stone 54.66508°N 3.26833°W	—	Mid 19th century	The stone marks the boundary between parishes. It has a rounded top and is inscribed "EMBLETON".
