= Pheasant Inn, Bassenthwaite =

Pub in Cumbria, England

Coordinates: 54.665057°N 3.242004°W

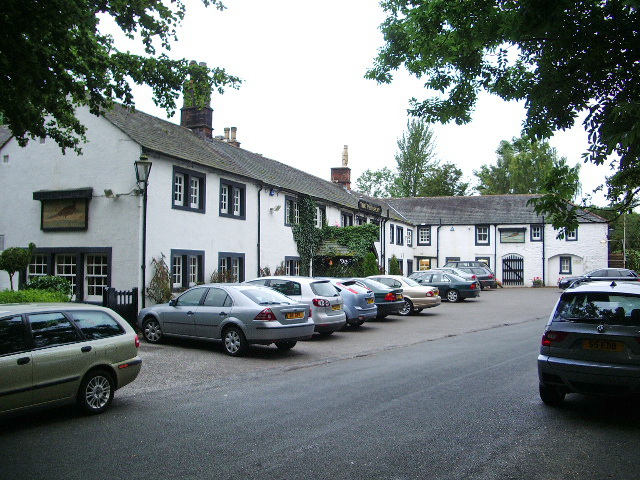
The Pheasant Inn

The Pheasant Inn is a historic coaching inn and public house in the civil parish of Wythop near Bassenthwaite Lake, Cumbria, in the English Lake District. It dates from the 18th century and is Grade II listed.

It is on the Campaign for Real Ale's National Inventory of Historic Pub Interiors.

In 2021 it was refurbished as a hotel by its new owners, the Inn Collection Group.
