= St Bridget's Church, Brigham =

Coordinates: 54.6651°N 3.4189°W

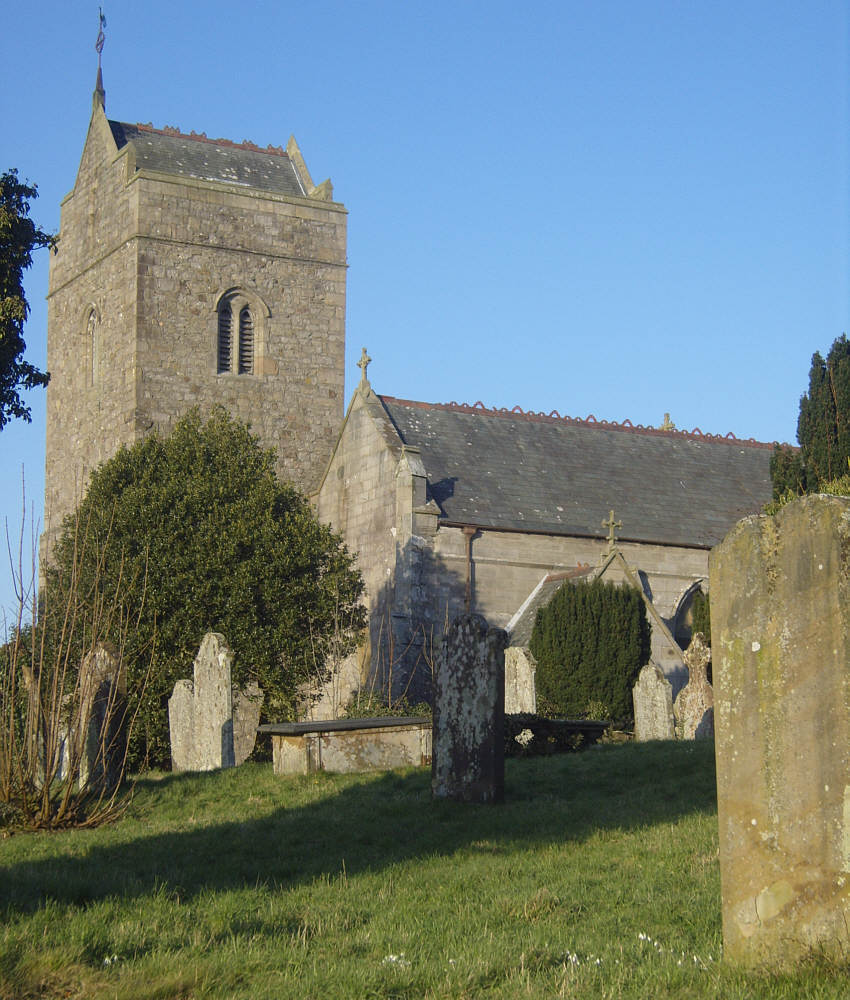
- St Bridget's Church, Brigham, from the southwest

- Location in Cumbria
- OS grid reference: NY 085 309
- Location: Brigham, Cumbria
- Country: England
- Denomination: Anglican

History
- Status: Parish church
- Dedication: St Bridget

Architecture
- Functional status: Active
- Heritage designation: Grade I
- Designated: 3 March 1967
- Architect: William Butterfield (restoration)
- Architectural type: Church
- Style: Norman, Gothic and Gothic Revival

Specifications
- Materials: Calciferous sandstone with green slate roofs

Administration
- Province: York
- Diocese: Carlisle
- Archdeaconry: West Cumberland
- Deanery: Solway
- Parish: Brigham

St Bridget's Church is in the village of Brigham, Cumbria, England. It is an active Anglican parish church in the deanery of Solway, the archdeaconry of West Cumberland, and the diocese of Carlisle. The church is recorded in the National Heritage List for England as a designated Grade I listed building.

== History ==
The church dates from the later part of the 11th century, with additions and alterations in the 12th and 13th centuries. The south aisle was re-built in the about 1323 as a chantry for the rector, Thomas de Burgh. Restoration of the church was carried out between 1864 and 1876 by William Butterfield; this included adding the east window and the south windows of the chancel, and the saddleback roof on the tower. The timber roofs of the nave and chancel also date from this restoration. Fletcher Christian, leader of the Mutiny on the Bounty, was baptised in the church on the day of his birth in 1764.

== Architecture ==
=== Exterior ===
St Bridget's is constructed in calciferous sandstone ashlar, and has a green slate roof. Its plan consists of a three-bay nave with a south aisle and south porch, and a two-bay chancel with a north vestry. At the west end is a three-storey tower with a saddleback roof, and at the ends of the gables are cross finials. The church contains elements of Norman, Gothic and Gothic Revival architecture. The Norman features include a blocked doorway in the north wall, and the arcade between the nave and the south aisle. The ground floor of the tower is tunnel-vaulted. Medieval cross slabs have been incorporated in the north wall and in the blocked west door.

=== Interior ===
Nave and chancel of St Bridget's, Brigham

Both the nave and the chancel have painted timber roofs. The south aisle contains a piscina, a sedilia, and a recess for the tomb of Thomas de Burgh, who died in 1348. In the church are pieces of carved stone; these include an Anglo-Danish cross-socket, and fragments dating from the pre-Norman period. The east window contains stained glass depicting the Ascension, designed by Alexander Gibbs, and is a memorial to Rev John Wordsworth, son of William Wordsworth, who was vicar of the church for 40 years. On each side of the east window are niches for statues. There is more glass by Gibbs in other windows, dating from 1865, and glass elsewhere by Cox & Buckley and Sons, from 1870. The font dates either from the 13th century or possibly from the 17th century. The two-manual organ was built in 1895 by W. Hill and Son of London.

== External features ==
In the churchyard is a red sandstone sundial dated 1684. It has a square shaft, the head is weathered and the gnomon is missing. The sundial is a Grade II listed structure. The churchyard also contains many carved gravestones from the 17th to the 19th centuries, and the table tomb of Fletcher Christian's father Charles.

== See also ==
- Grade I listed churches in Cumbria
- Listed buildings in Brigham, Cumbria
