= Brackenthwaite, Buttermere =

Settlement in Cumbria, England

Coordinates: 54.587333°N 3.313065°W

Brackenthwaite
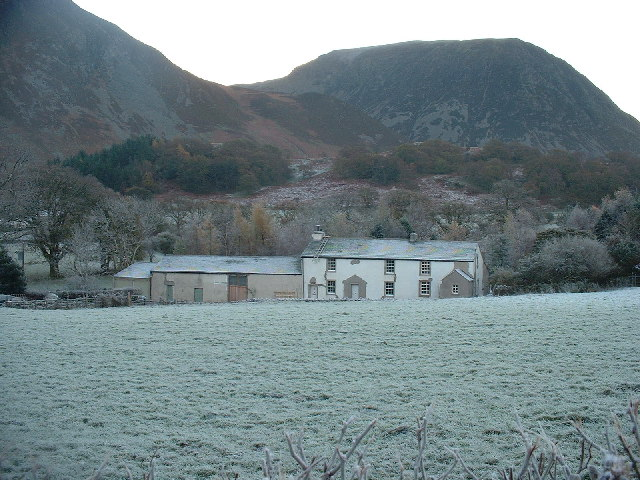

- Location within Cumbria
- OS grid reference: NY151221
- Civil parish: Buttermere
- Unitary authority: Cumberland
- Ceremonial county: Cumbria
- Region: North West
- Country: England
- Sovereign state: United Kingdom
- Post town: COCKERMOUTH
- Postcode district: CA13
- Dialling code: 01900
- Police: Cumbria
- Fire: Cumbria
- Ambulance: North West
- UK Parliament: Penrith and Solway

Brackenthwaite is a hamlet in the parish of Buttermere, in the Cumberland district of Cumbria, England. It is situated some 6 miles (9.7 km) south of Cockermouth. It lies within the Lake District National Park.

== History ==
The name is recorded as Bracanethuaite in the 12th century. It derives from the Old Norse brakni 'bush' and thveit 'assart' (cf. thwaite) like Bregentved (Denmark) and Bracquetuit (Normandy) (cf. Thuit).

Brackenthwaite was historically a township in the ancient parish of Brigham. The parish of Brigham was large, and its four south-eastern townships of Brackenthwaite, Buttermere, Lorton and Wythop were served by a chapel of ease at Lorton.

The township of Brackenthwaite took on civil functions under the poor laws from the 17th century onwards. As such, the township also became a civil parish in 1866, when the legal definition of 'parish' was changed to be the areas used for administering the poor laws. The parish of Brackenthwaite was included in the Cockermouth Rural District from 1894.

In 1934, the parish was abolished and its area added to the neighbouring parish of Buttermere. At the 1931 census (the last before the abolition of the parish), Brackenthwaite had a population of 89.

== See also ==
- Listed buildings in Buttermere, Cumbria
