= Wythop =

Civil parish in Cumbria, England

Coordinates: 54.650°N 3.266°W

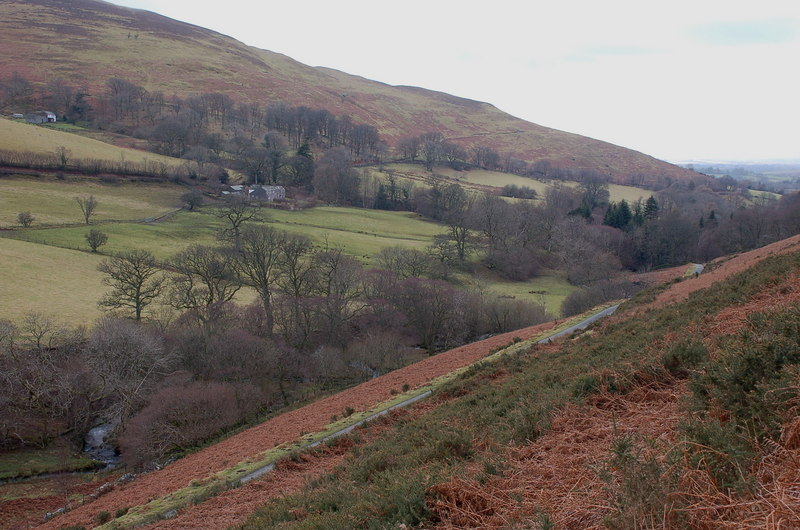
- Wythop Beck and Eskin farm

- Location within Cumbria
- Population: 36 (Parish, 2021)
- OS grid reference: NY182290
- Civil parish: Wythop
- Unitary authority: Cumberland
- Ceremonial county: Cumbria
- Region: North West
- Country: England
- Sovereign state: United Kingdom
- Post town: COCKERMOUTH
- Postcode district: CA13
- Dialling code: 017687
- Police: Cumbria
- Fire: Cumbria
- Ambulance: North West
- UK Parliament: Penrith and Solway

Wythop is a civil parish in the Cumberland district of Cumbria, England. It lies between the towns of Cockermouth and Keswick and is within the Lake District National Park. At the 2021 census the parish had a population of 36.

== Toponymy ==
'Wythop' is " 'withy valley', cf. 'wīðig', 'hop' " (from the Old English). 'Wīðig','withy' means 'willow', 'hop' means 'a small enclosed valley'; so 'Wythop' is the 'valley of willow trees'.

== Geography ==
Alfred Wainwright stressed the unique nature of Wythop valley, in that instead of rising to a crest it fell away to the declivity of Bassenthwaite Lake. However he also made the point that "its scenery is in no way freakish. Here is a charming and secluded natural sanctuary in an idyllic setting.

The promontory of Beck Wythop was selected by Thomas West as one of his four 'stations' for viewing Bassenthwaite Lake.

The settlement of Wythop Mill is just outside the parish boundary, forming part of the neighbouring parish of Embleton.

== Governance ==
There are two tiers of local government covering Wythop, at parish and unitary authority level: Embleton and District Parish Council and Cumberland Council. The parish council is a grouped parish council, covering the three civil parishes of Embleton, Setmurthy, and Wythop. The parish is wholly within the Lake District National Park, and so some functions are administered by the Lake District National Park Authority, notably planning.

Wythop is within the Penrith and Solway UK Parliamentary constituency.

=== Administrative history ===
Wythop was historically a township in the ancient parish of Brigham, which formed part of the historic county of Cumberland.

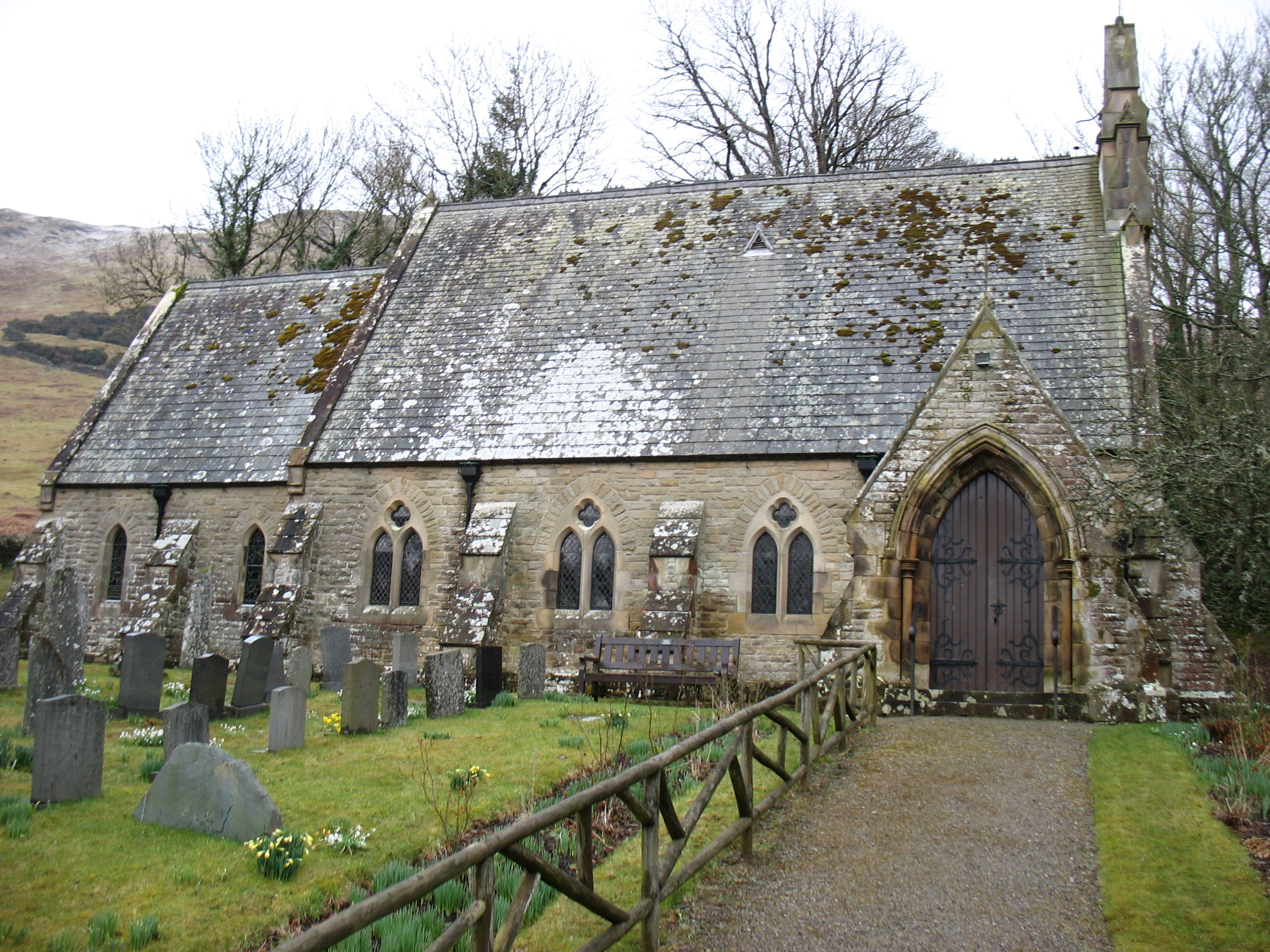
St Margaret's Church, built 1864

The parish of Brigham was large, and its four south-eastern townships of Brackenthwaite, Buttermere, Lorton, and Wythop were served by a chapel of ease at Lorton. Another chapel was subsequently built at Wythop, which was subordinate to the one at Lorton. Wythop was made a separate ecclesiastical parish in 1835. In 1864, a replacement Wythop church dedicated to St Margaret was built on a new site; the old church near Kelswick Farm is now in ruins.

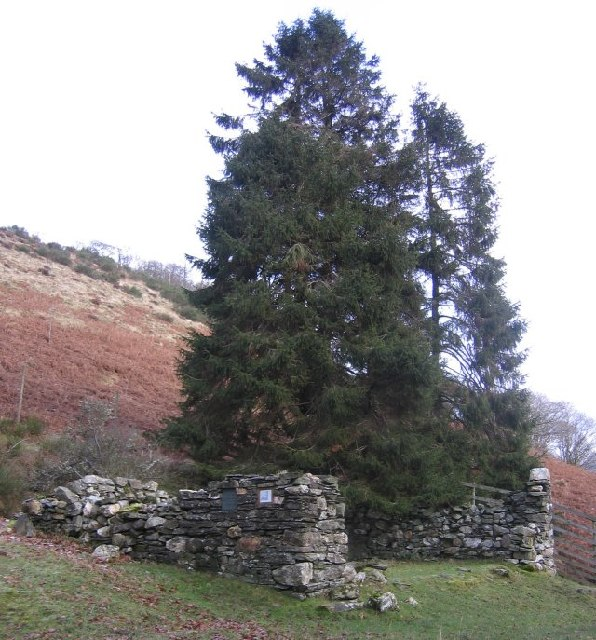
Ruins of Wythop Chapel near Kelswick Farm

The township of Wythop took on civil functions under the poor laws from the 17th century onwards. As such, the township also became a civil parish in 1866, when the legal definition of 'parish' was changed to be the areas used for administering the poor laws.

When elected parish and district councils were established in 1894, Wythop was included in the Cockermouth Rural District. Cockermouth Rural District was abolished in 1974, becoming part of the borough of Allerdale in the new county of Cumbria. Allerdale was in turn abolished in 2023 when the new Cumberland Council was created, also taking over the functions of the abolished Cumbria County Council in the area.

== See also ==
- Listed buildings in Wythop
