= Cockermouth Rural District =

Rural district in Cumberland, England

Coordinates: 54.664°N 3.367°W

Cockermouth was a rural district in Cumberland, England, from 1894 to 1974.

It was created by the Local Government Act 1894 based on Cockermouth rural sanitary district. It entirely surrounded but did not include the towns of Cockermouth and Keswick, and also surrounded Maryport on its land side.

It was abolished by the Local Government Act 1972 on 1 April 1974 and has since formed part of the Allerdale district of Cumbria.
