= Grade I listed churches in Cumbria =

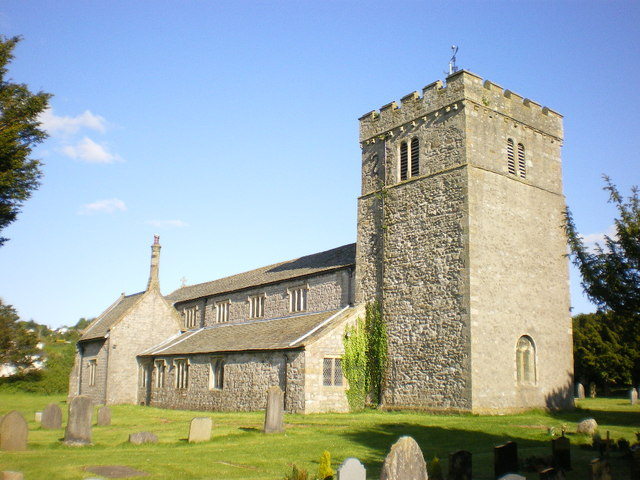
St James, Burton-in-Kendal

Cumbria is a county in North West England. It was created in 1974 from the historical counties of Westmorland and Cumberland, together with the Furness area of Lancashire and the Sedbergh Rural District of the West Riding of Yorkshire. Its largest settlement is the county town of Carlisle. Buildings in England are given listed building status by the Secretary of State for Culture, Media and Sport, acting on the recommendation of Historic England. Listed status gives the structure national recognition and protection against alteration or demolition without authorisation. Grade I listed buildings are defined as being of "exceptional interest, sometimes considered to be internationally important"; only 2.5 per cent of listed buildings are included in this grade.

There have been Christian churches in Cumbria since the Anglo-Saxon era. Anglo-Saxon elements to be found in the churches include the lower parts of the towers of St Michael, Beetham, and St Laurence, Morland. Many of the churches have Norman features, including the tower of St Michael, Barton, the north arcade of St Andrew, Crosby Garrett, the crossing of St Lawrence, Crosby Ravensworth, much of St John the Evangelist, Crosscanonby, the north arcade and three doorways of St Mary, Kirkby Lonsdale, and a doorway, the arcades and the chancel arch of St Michael, Torpenhow. Gothic features are found in churches that originated at a later date, such as All Saints, Boltongate, and in additions to older churches, such as St Lawrence, Appleby, St Michael, Burgh by Sands, and Carlisle Cathedral. St James, Whitehaven, is in Georgian style, as is the nave of St Andrew, Penrith. Gothic Revival features can be found in churches that were restored or altered during the 19th century, and include the north transept added to St Michael, Muncaster by Anthony Salvin, additions to St Martin, Bowness-on-Windermere by Paley and Austin, and William Butterfield's restoration of St Bridget, Brigham. The most modern church in the list is St Martin, Brampton, which was built between 1874 and 1878, and is the only church designed by Philip Webb, using a variety of architectural styles.

Cumbria is predominantly rural, and has the largest national park in England and Wales, the Lake District. The county's major industry is tourism, but there is also some manufacturing, especially in the coastal towns of Barrow-in-Furness and Whitehaven. The geology of the county is complex: the central Lake District region contains volcanic and metamorphic rocks, with sedimentary rocks around the periphery. The building materials used for the churches are mainly the sedimentary rocks of sandstone and limestone, with roofs in metamorphic slate. Stone from the nearby Roman Hadrian's Wall was re-used in the construction of some churches in the north of the county, including St Andrew, Aikton, St Michael, Burgh by Sands, and St Peter, Kirkbampton. Viking material in the form of statues and the Gosforth Cross is found in association with St Mary, Gosforth, and in a wall of St Mary and St Michael, Great Urswick, is a cross-shaft thought to be Viking in origin. Because of Cumbria's proximity to Scotland, several churches incorporate defensive features, including St Michael, Burgh by Sands, St Mungo, Dearham, St James, Great Ormside, and St John, Newton Arlosh. This list consists of the 49 Grade I listed ecclesiastical buildings in the ceremonial county of Cumbria, as recorded in the National Heritage List for England.

== Churches ==
Name	Location	Photograph	Notes
St Mary	Abbeytown; 54.8454°N 3.2829°W	The west end of the stone church with a projecting two-storey porch, large buttresses and a double bellcote	The present church consists of part of the nave of Holmcultram Abbey, a Cistercian monastery founded in 1150. A west porch was added in 1507. Following the dissolution of the monasteries in 1538, the congregation was allowed to use the building as their parish church. The tower fell in 1600, destroying the choir and the north transept, an event that was followed by a fire in 1604. The building was modified between 1727 and 1739, shortening the nave, and removing the aisles and clerestory. The church was restored in 1913, and an ambulatory was created in 1973, but the building was again damaged by fire in 2006. It is constructed in sandstone, and contains a Norman west doorway and a Perpendicular east window.
St Andrew	Aikton; 54.8653°N 3.1194°W	The plain west end of a stone church with a two-light window and a double bellcote surmounted by a saltire finial	St Andrew's dates from the 12th century, and retains some Norman features, including the chancel arch. Stones from Hadrian's Wall were used in its construction. The east and south walls of the chancel were rebuilt in 1732, and the north and south walls of the nave rebuilt in 1869. At the west end is a double bellcote surmounted by a St Andrew's cross. The porch contains a 13th-century upside-down grave-slab.
St Lawrence	Appleby-in-Westmorland; 54.5782°N 2.4915°W	A broad stone church seen from the east with aisles of differing sizes and a battlemented west tower	The oldest part of the church is the Norman lower stage of the tower, dating from about 1130. The body of the church is from the 14th century, and is in Decorated style. The exterior of the church is in Perpendicular style. Between 1655 and 1666, the northeast chapel was added and the chancel was rebuilt, this being paid for by Lady Anne Clifford. The church was restored in 1861–62, and again in 1960. The organ was acquired from Carlisle Cathedral in 1674. In the north chapel are monuments to Lady Anne Clifford, and to her mother, Lady Margaret Clifford.
St Michael	Barton; 54.6298°N 2.7954°W	A stone church seen from the southeast with a central tower surmounted by a plain parapet	St Michael's has a central tower dating from the 12th century; the nave dates from the same century. The south aisle was added in the following century, a north aisle and a south chapel in about 1300, and the chancel in the early 14th century. Perpendicular-style windows were inserted in the 16th century, the south porch was added in the following century, and the vestry was built in about 1904. It is the only church in Cumbria to have a central Norman tower on a medieval parish church.
St Michael	Beetham; 54.2094°N 2.7741°W	A stone church see from the south with a slim west tower, a battlemented south aisle, and a clerestory with three-light windows	It is possible that the lower part of the tower of St Michael's dates from the Anglo-Saxon era. The south aisle was added in about 1200, the chancel was extended during the 13th century, and in the following century the Beetham chapel was added. The south aisle was widened in the 15th century, and in the following century the top stage of the tower was built. There was a restoration in 1873–75. The south arcade is in Norman style.
All Saints	Bolton; 54.6046°N 2.5599°W	A long, low stone church seen from the south with a west bellcote surmounted by a saddleback roof	This long narrow church was built in the 12th and 13th centuries, with later alterations. It was restored in 1848. At the west end is a bellcote with a saddleback roof. The church contains Norman features, including windows and a south doorway. An early 12th-century carved stone above the doorway depicts two knights on horseback.
All Saints	Boltongate; 54.7560°N 3.1986°W	A stone church seen from the southwest with a west bellcote	All Saints dates from the 14th century, replacing an earlier church. It is constructed in limestone; the roof of the nave is in sandstone slate, and that of the chancel is green slate. The plan consists of a nave with north and south porches, north and south transepts, a chancel and a north vestry. At the west end is a double bellcote. The architectural style is Perpendicular. The roof of the nave is a pointed barrel vault.
St Martin	Bowness-on-Windermere; 54.3641°N 2.9210°W	A long stone church seen from the south with a clerestory and a west tower surmounted by a battlemented parapet and a saddleback roof	A chapel of ease built in 1203 was replaced by the present church in about 1483, retaining the tower base. The clerestory was probably added in the 16th century. The church was restored in 1870 by Paley and Austin, who added the saddleback roof to the tower, built the stair turret, and extended the chancel. The northeast vestry was built in 1911 by W. L. Dolman, who converted it into a chapel in 1922. Painted on the internal walls are texts dating from the 16th century, and further decoration executed by Henry Hughes in the 19th century. One of the monuments is by John Flaxman.
St Martin	Brampton; 54.9417°N 2.7379°W	A stone church seen from the northwest with a west tower surmounted by a saddleback roof and a spirelet and a three-gabled north aisle	St Martin's was built in 1877–78. It is the only church designed by Pre-Raphaelite architect Philip Webb. The top stage of the tower, featuring a saddleback roof with a lead spirelet, was added in 1906 by George Jack, following Webb's design. The church is constructed in sandstone with green slate roofs. All the stained glass was made by Morris & Co. and designed by Edward Burne-Jones. The font, moved from another church, dates from the 13th century.
St Bridget	Brigham; 54.6651°N 3.4189°W	The west end of a stone church with a northwest tower surmounted by a saddleback roof	Originating in the 11th century, St Bridget's had alterations and additions in each of the following three centuries. Between 1864 and 1876, William Butterfield restored the church; this included adding the east window and the south windows of the chancel, as well as the saddleback roof on the tower. Inside, many of the furnishings and the floor tiles were designed by Butterfield. The stained glass in some of the windows was designed by Alexander Gibbs under Butterfield's direction.
St Mungo	Bromfield; 54.8114°N 3.2840°W	A simple, small, stone church with a west bellcote seen from the south	St Mungo's Church dates from the 12th century, with later additions and alterations. One of the additions was the chantry chapel of St George which originated in 1395. It was suppressed at the time of the dissolution of the monasteries, and restored in 1925. The north aisle and north transept were rebuilt in 1861, creating a family chapel in the transept. The chancel was restored in 1893. On the south of the church is a re-set Norman doorway, whose tympanum consists of a re-used hogback stone. At the west end of the church is a double bellcote, and at the east end is a smaller medieval bellcote with an angelus bell.
St Ninian (also known as Ninekirks)	Brougham; 54.6628°N 2.6847°W	A long. low, small church with a small west bellcote seen from the southeast	The church originated in the Norman era, but was completely rebuilt in 1659–60 at the expense of Lady Anne Clifford. It consists of a four-bay nave and a single-bay chancel, with a west bellcote and a south porch added in the 19th century. Almost all the furnishings date from the 17th century, including a three-decker pulpit with a sounding board, the font, and box pews. The church is now redundant and in the care of the Churches Conservation Trust.
St Michael	Burgh by Sands; 54.9221°N 3.0489°W	A stone church seen from the northwest with a squat west tower and a north aisle containing thin lancet windows	Built in stone from Hadrian's Wall, the church probably dates from the late 12th century. The north aisle was added in around 1200. St Michael's is a fortified church to resist Scottish raiders. During the 14th century the church was lengthened by the addition of a defensive tower at each end. There remains an internal yett or iron-barred gate to make the west tower defensible. The east tower was reduced in height in about 1713, and the church was restored in 1880–81. The west doorway is Norman, and the rest of the medieval church is Early English in style. The top of the west tower is probably Georgian.
St James	Burton-in-Kendal; 54.1859°N 2.7210°W	A stone church seen from the northwest with a battlemented west tower	The lower part of the tower and the northwest corner of the nave of St James' are Norman, dating from the 12th century. Alterations and additions, including the aisles and chapels, were made during the next four centuries. The church was restored in 1844, when the chancel and north chapel were built and the clerestory added, and again in 1872. It is constructed in limestone with dressings in limestone and sandstone. The windows contain Decorated and Perpendicular tracery.
St Kentigern	Caldbeck; 54.7495°N 3.0495°W	A stone church seen from the southeast with a clerestory and a battlemented west tower	St Kentigern's was built in the 12th and 13th centuries, and retains features of Norman architecture in the south porch. Alterations were made in 1512, and in 1727 the west tower was built. The church was restored by C. J. Ferguson in 1880; work included rebuilding the chancel roof. In 1932–33 the clerestory was added by C. J. Fawcett Martindale. The tower is constructed in limestone, the body of the church in sandstone, and the roofs are in green slate.
Carlisle Cathedral	Carlisle; 54.8947°N 2.9384°W	A bulky red-stone building with transepts and a central battlemented tower	The cathedral originated as an Augustinian priory church in the 12th century. Repeated additions were made until the dissolution of the monasteries, following which the building was much reduced in size. Since then there have been restorations and alterations; in 1765 by Thomas Pitt, in 1852–56 by Ewan Christian, and in 1871–80 by G. E. Street. Later alterations were made under Charles Nicholson and S. E. Dykes Bower. The nave is in Norman style, and the choir is in a mixture of Early English and Decorated styles.
St Mary	Cartmel; 54.2011°N 2.9524°W	A large church seen from the southwest with a nine-light west window and a central tower set diagonally	Cartmel Priory was founded in about 1189 by the Augustinians. Following its dissolution in 1536, the whole of the priory church became the parish church. By the beginning of the 17th century it was in poor condition, and was repaired by George Preston of Holker Hall. It was restored during the 19th century, particularly between 1857 and 1870 by E. G. Paley. The church has a cruciform plan: the tower is at the crossing, with its upper stage set diagonally. There are Norman features, including a south doorway and blocked windows.
St Anthony	Cartmel Fell; 54.2849°N 2.8977°W	A small, low, simple church seen from the southwest with an elongated west tower surmounted by a saddleback roof	This long, low church was built as a chapel of ease to Cartmel Priory in about 1504. Extensions were added to the north and south at the east end in about 1520. The church was restored in 1911 by John Curwen. It is constructed in roughcast stone with a slate roof. At the west end is a low tower with a saddleback roof. Inside the church is a three-sided altar rail and a three-decker pulpit. The stained glass includes fragments dating from about 1520.
St Andrew	Crosby Garrett; 54.4821°N 2.4184°W	The nave of a stone church seen from the south with a porch and a west tower surmounted by a pyramidal roof	The church dates from the 11th century, with a Norman north arcade built in about 1175. The small west tower dates from the 13th century, and the chancel was rebuilt and enlarged in the following century. A north vestry was added in 1745. The north aisle was rebuilt in 1866 by E. Johnson in Norman Revival style. The tower was rebuilt in 1874, and has a low pyramidal roof and corner pinnacles.
St Lawrence	Crosby Ravensworth; 54.5274°N 2.5865°W	A stone church seen from the north east with a north transept and a battlemented west tower with a tall circular stair turret surmounted by a conical roof	The oldest part of the church is at the crossing, dating from about 1190–1200. The south Norman doorway dates from the 13th century, and the west tower was built in the late 15th century. The church was remodelled twice in the 19th century; first by George Gibson in 1811–12, who added a southwest porch and a south chancel doorway. The second remodelling was carried out between 1848 and 1887 by the incumbent Revd George F. Watson in conjunction with J. S. Crowther. This included adding a new top stage to the tower, a clerestory, and transepts, and rebuilding the chancel.
St John the Evangelist	Crosscanonby; 54.7373°N 3.4472°W	A simple stone church seen from the south with a west bellcote	St John's dates from the 12th century, with alterations during the following two centuries. It was restored by C. J. Ferguson in 1880. The church is constructed in sandstone blocks, some of which came from former Roman buildings. Its architecture is mainly Norman, although the south aisle is in Decorated style. In the porch are part of a 10th-century cross-shaft decorated with carvings of beasts, and a grave-cover, possibly from the 11th century. Outside the church is a 10th-century hogback stone.
St Andrew	Dacre; 54.6320°N 2.8380°W	A stone church seen from the southwest with battlemented parapets on the west tower, south aisle and nave	The church was built in the 12th century, with additions in the following century. The tower was rebuilt in 1810. There were repairs in 1854 and a restoration in 1874–75. Norman features include the tower arch and the chancel windows. In the chancel is a 12th-century piscina. Also in the church are two cross-shaft fragments, one dating from the 9th century, the other from the 10th or 11th century. In addition there are monuments, one of which is by Francis Leggatt Chantrey.
St Oswald	Dean; 54.6149°N 3.4403°W	A low stone church with a double bellcote at the junction of the chancel and nave	The church dates from the 12th century, with extensions in the 13th and 15th centuries, and alterations in the 17th century. It is constructed in calciferous sandstone, and consists of a three-bay nave, a lower and narrower three-bay chancel, and a north vestry. On the east gable of the nave is a double bellcote. Inside the church are carved furnishings by Robert (Mouseman) Thompson.
St Mungo	Dearham; 54.7140°N 3.4412°W	A stone church seen from the southwest with a massive west tower containing very small windows	This Norman church was built in the late 12th century, with additions during the following century. The large tower, built for defence, dates from the 14th century. The north aisle was added by C. J. Ferguson in 1882. The font is Norman, and carved with dragon-like creatures. Also in the church are carved stones dating from the 10th and 11th centuries.
St Andrew	Dent; 54.2781°N 2.4542°W	The western part of a stone church seen from the south with a clerestory and a battlemented west tower	St Andrew's probably dates from the 12th century, and was enlarged and remodelled in the 16th century. The tower is said to have been added in the 18th century. In 1889–90, the church was restored by Paley, Austin and Paley. It is mainly in Perpendicular style. In the church is a memorial to the geologist Adam Sedgwick.
St Cuthbert	Edenhall; 54.6816°N 2.6700°W	A red stone church seen from the northwest with a north transept and a west tower surmounted by a battlemented parapet with machicolations and a short spire	The church originated in the 12th century, with additions and alterations during each of the following three centuries. The tower was built in the middle of the 15th century. The church was repaired in 1662, and in 1834 the south porch and north vestry were added. The parapet of the tower has battlements, and structures similar to machicolations. On the summit of the tower is a short spire with a weathercock.
St Mary	Gosforth; 54.4192°N 3.4314°W	The western part of a church seen from the southwest with a west bellcote and a large roofed lychgate in the foreground	The oldest remaining fabric in the present church dates from the 12th century, although there has been a Christian presence since the 8th century. The church was remodelled and extended between 1896 and 1899 by C. J. Ferguson. The former south Norman doorway has been blocked with stone. The church is associated with a group of Viking sculptures dating from the early 10th century, including the Gosforth Cross.
St Oswald	Grasmere; 54.4575°N 3.0237°W	The rendered tower of a church and part of the nave	Dating from the 14th century, the body of the church consists of two naves, which were doubled in size between 1490 and 1500. Originally each nave had a separate roof, but these were replaced by a single roof in about 1562. The naves are divided by an arcade in two tiers; the upper tier was added when the roof was replaced. The walls and windows were restored in 1840 by George Webster. The tower is at the southeast, with walls that slope inwards. In the church is a memorial to the poet William Wordsworth by Thomas Woolner, containing an epitaph by John Keble.
St James	Great Ormside; 54.5531°N 2.4631°W	A stone church seen from the southeast with an elongated squat west tower surmounted by a saddleback roof	The nave of St James' was built in the 11th century, with a small chancel. The defensive west tower was added in about 1200; its top was later truncated. In the early 16th century the chancel was enlarged, making it wider than the nave. The north aisle was replaced in 1723 by the Hilton chapel. During the 19th century the Norman south doorway was blocked, and replaced by a new doorway and a porch immediately to the west. The font is Norman.
St Mary and St Michael	Great Urswick; 54.1583°N 3.1218°W	The east end of a stone church with a gabled north vestry and a squat battlemented west tower	The tower of this church dates from the 13th century, and has a Perpendicular top stage. The chancel is also from the 13th century, and was lengthened during the following century. The nave and vestry date from the 14th century. The windows contain tracery in Decorated and Perpendicular styles. A west gallery was added in 1828. When the church was restored in the early 20th century, two cross shafts were found in the walls, one of which is considered to be of Viking origin.
St Michael and All Angels	Hawkshead; 54.3739°N 2.9990°W	A stone church seen from the northwest with a clerestory and a west tower surmounted by a battlemented parapet and corner pinnacles	The church dates from the late 15th or early 16th century. The north aisle was rebuilt in 1578, becoming the Sandys Chapel, and the clerestory was added at about the same time. In about 1793 a vestry and a hearse house were added. Paintings were executed on the walls and capitals in 1680 by James Addison; these were restored in 1875–76. In the church are two memorials moved from the London Church of St Dionis Backchurch when it was demolished in the 19th century.
Ireby Old Church	Ireby; 54.7427°N 3.2071°W	A very small stone church with lancet windows and a single west bellcote	Only the chancel remains of this redundant church, now under the care of the Churches Conservation Trust. It was built in the 12th century and contains some Norman features. The nave, north aisle and porch were demolished in 1845–46. What remained was restored in 1880 by Ewan Christian. The chancel is constructed in blocks of sandstone and limestone, and has a green slate roof.
St Michael	Isel; 54.6879°N 3.3009°W	A simple small church seen from the northwest with a west double bellcote	Originating in the 12th century, the south doorway of the church and the chancel arch are in Norman style. The church was restored in 1878 by C. J. Ferguson. It is constructed in calciferous sandstone with slate roofs. The church consists of a four-bay nave with a south porch and a double bellcote, and a three-bay chancel with a north vestry.
Holy Trinity	Kendal; 54.3225°N 2.7443°W	A large stone church seen from the northwest with battlemented parapets and pinnacles on the west tower and the body of the church	The church dates from the 13th century, but its present appearance is mainly the result of extensive restorations by J. S. Crowther between 1850 and 1868. It is the largest church in Cumbria, and has five aisles. Other than the west porch, and a north vestry added in 1934, the plan is a rectangle, the aisles embracing the west tower and the chancel. The architectural style is Perpendicular. In the church is a memorial to the painter George Romney.
St Peter	Kirkbampton; 54.8980°N 3.0848°W	Part of a simple, small church seen from the north, with a projecting porch and vestry and a bellcote on the west gable	St Peter's dates from the 12th century, and contains Norman architecture. It was restored in 1870–71, and again in 1882. During these restorations, carved and inscribed stones from the nearby Roman Hadrian's Wall were found incorporated in the fabric of the south wall. The windows include stained glass designed by William Morris and Edward Burne-Jones.
St Mary	Kirkby Lonsdale; 54.2037°N 2.5975°W	The west end of a stone church with the west tower embraced in the body of the church, a Norman west doorway and battlemented parapets	This church with a south aisle and two north aisles was built between the 12th and 16th centuries. Alterations were made in the 18th century and in 1807. A restoration was carried out in 1866 by E. G. Paley, which included raising the roofs and adding the south porch. Norman features include three doorways and the north arcade.
St Mary	Lanercost; 54.9662°N 2.6949°W	The west end of a red stone church with an elaborate doorway, blind arcading, three tall lancet windows, and a niche containing a statue in the gable	St Mary's has been converted from the nave of Lanercost Priory, the building of which started during the later part of the 1170s. After the dissolution of the monasteries, the building was in ruins until the nave was re-roofed in 1739–40. The church is constructed in sandstone taken from the nearby Hadrian's Wall. It was restored between 1847 and 1849 by Anthony Salvin, and a further restoration was carried out in the 1870s by C. J. Ferguson. The internal furnishings are mainly by Salvin and Ferguson. The stained glass in the north aisle windows was designed by Edward Burne-Jones and made by Morris & Co.
St Margaret and St James	Long Marton; 54.6100°N 2.5178°W	A stone church seen from the southeast with a south transept and a west tower with a plain parapet	In the nave of St Margaret and St James' are Saxon and Norman features, including windows, and doorways with tympana containing carvings. The tower was probably built in the early 12th century, and the chancel was extended later that century. The south transept was added in the 15th century, and a vestry in the following century. The church was restored in 1880 by John A. Cory.
Holy Trinity	Millom; 54.2207°N 3.2729°W	A small church seen from the south with a nave containing three three-light windows, one of which is blocked, a small chancel, and a west bellcote	The nave and chancel of Holy Trinity date from the late 12th century, including a Norman north doorway. The south aisle was added early the following century, and was substantially enlarged in about 1335. A porch was added in 1906. The chancel was widened during a 1930 restoration, when part of a cross shaft dating from the 10th or 11th century was found built into the chancel wall. Inside the church, all the pews are box pews, and there are monuments, the oldest dating from 1484.
St Laurence	Morland; 54.5965°N 2.6235°W	A stone church seen from the south, with a large south transept, and a west tower surmounted by a short recessed lead-covered spire	The tower of St Laurence's is the only Anglo-Saxon tower in the northwest of England. It was raised in height probably in 1588, and a lead-covered spire was added later. The church has a cruciform plan with Norman features. Aisles were added in the late 12th century, and the transepts in about 1225 in Early English style. In 1600 the chancel was rebuilt with Perpendicular windows. The north aisle was rebuilt in the 18th century with Georgian windows. The church was restored in 1896 by C. J. Ferguson.
St Michael	Muncaster; 54.3568°N 3.3803°W	A small stone church seen from the southwest with two bellcotes and a battlemented parapet	St Michael's stands in the grounds of Muncaster Castle, and dates from the 16th century. It was restored in 1873 by Anthony Salvin, who added the north transept in Decorated style, as well as battlements. Its plan consists of a four-bay nave, a three-bay chancel and a north transept. On the west gable is a double bellcote, and on the east gable is a Sanctus bellcote.
St John	Newton Arlosh; 54.8855°N 3.2506°W	A stone church seen from the south, with a large squat battlemented west tower and a small body, both which contain very small windows	Built in about 1303 by the monks of Holm Cultram Abbey, this fortified church fell into ruin after the Dissolution of the Monasteries. In 1844 Sarah Losh restored the church and extended it to the north. In 1894 the orientation of the church was changed, turning it to the north, making the former nave into a narthex, the extension into the body of the church, and the former east apse into a vestry. The church had a defensive rôle to resist Scottish raiders, with the tower acting as a pele tower.
St Andrew	Penrith; 54.6642°N 2.7512°W	A stone tower with a doorway flanked by columns, a clock face, louvred bell openings, and a battlemented parapet	The lower part of the tower of St Andrew's was built in the 12th and 13th centuries, and the top stage was altered between 1460 and 1470. In 1720 the body of the church and the west doorway were rebuilt in Georgian style. Inside the church are galleries on three sides, carried on Tuscan columns, and paintings on the walls.
St Oswald	Ravenstonedale; 54.4330°N 2.4296°W	A stone church seen from the south, with lancet windows, and a battlemented west tower	The tower of St Oswald's was rebuilt in 1738, and the rest of the church in 1744. It replaced an older church and re-used some of its material, including the outer doorway of the former south porch, which dated from about 1200. The church consists of a west tower, a nave without aisles, and a chancel. Inside is a west gallery. The seating is arranged in the manner of a college chapel, facing inwards, and consists of six raked ranks of box pews. In the middle of the north side is a three-decker pulpit with a sounding board.
St Mary and St Bega	St Bees; 54.4939°N 3.5934°W	A stone church seen from an angle, with a clerestory and a large central tower with a plain parapet	St Bees Priory was founded on an existing religious site as a Benedictine priory by William Meschin sometime after 1120. Following its dissolution in 1539 the roof of the chancel was removed but the nave was retained in use as the parish church. It was repaired in 1611 and 1622. Between 1855 and the 1880s William Butterfield carried out remodelling and restoration that included re-roofing the transepts and aisles, and he re-built the upper tower in a bold Romanesque style. The fine west doorway is Norman dating from about 1140. Much of the internal furnishings are by Butterfield.
St Andrew	Sedbergh; 54.3231°N 2.5285°W	A long stone church see from the north, with a clerestory, a battlemented parapet along the aisle, and a west tower	The church dates from about 1500. It was restored in 1886 by Paley and Austin. The church contains fabric from earlier periods. Its plan consists of a nave with a clerestory, north and south aisles, the north aisle extending into the vestry and the south aisle into a chapel, a chancel, and a three-stage west tower. Inside the church the arcades differ, the south having six bays, and the north eight.
St Michael	Torpenhow; 54.7469°N 3.2353°W	A simple stone church seen from the northwest with a transept and a bellcote surmounted by pinnacles	St Michael's originated in the early 12th century and contains Norman features, including a south doorway, the arcades, the chancel arch, and the font. The north transept dates from the 13th century, and the west bellcote probably from the 17th century. In 1689 the nave ceiling was painted by Thomas Addison. The church was restored between 1880 and 1882 by John A. Cory, who also added the south porch.
St Columba	Warcop; 54.5360°N 2.3988°W	The west end of a stone church with a three-light window and a square bellcote with machicolations and a battlemented parapet	The church dates from the 12th century, and contains Norman features in the north wall of the nave. Later alterations and additions resulted in the presence of Early English and Perpendicular features. The chancel was rebuilt in 1854–55 by J. S. Crowther. The church has a cruciform plan, each transept containing a piscina.
St James	Whitehaven; 54.5508°N 3.5834°W	A rendered church seen from the northwest with two tiers of rectangular windows and an embraced west tower surmounted by pinnacles	Built between 1752 and 1773, this church is in Georgian style. It was designed by Carlisle Spedding (or possibly by Christopher Myers). The apse was restored in 1871, and the church was reordered by C. J. Ferguson in 1886. A baptistry was created in 1921. There are galleries on three sides, and the ceiling contains roundels painted with depictions of the Annunciation and the Ascension.
