= Listed buildings in Kirkbampton =

Kirkbampton a civil parish in the Cumberland unitary authority area of Cumbria, England. It contains nine listed buildings that are recorded in the National Heritage List for England. Of these, one is listed at Grade I, the highest of the three grades, and the others are at Grade II, the lowest grade. The parish contains the settlements of Kirkbampton, Little Bampton, and Oughterby, and is otherwise rural. The listed buildings consist of a 12th-century church, houses, farmhouses, farm buildings, and a war memorial.

== Key ==
Grade	Criteria
I	Buildings of exceptional interest, sometimes considered to be internationally important
II	Buildings of national importance and special interest

== Buildings ==
Name and location	Photograph	Date	Notes	Grade
St Peter's Church; 54.89803°N 3.08484°W		12th century	The church was restored in 1870–71 and again in 1882. It is in calciferous and red sandstone, the roof of the chancel is in sandstone slate, and elsewhere the roofs are in green slate. The church consists of a nave with a south porch, and a chancel with a north organ chamber and vestry. On the west gable is an open double bellcote. It has retained some Norman features, including the north doorway, a priest's door (now blocked), and the chancel arch.	I
Haverlands House; 54.90239°N 3.11415°W	—	17th century (or earlier	A farmhouse and attached outbuilding in rendered mud and brick, and with slate roofs. The house has one storey at the front, two at the rear, and three bays. There are central two-light windows with pointed heads, a small window to the left and a fire window to the right. The outbuilding to the left has one storey and contains a projecting central porch, doorways, and small windows. In the left return is a loft door.	II
Post Office and adjoining house 54.89843°N 3.08181°W	—	Late 17th or early 18th century	The building, which originated as a barn, a house and a byre, was altered in 1804. It is in rendered clay, the house was raised in brick, and the roofs are in Welsh slate. To the left is the Post Office, with three bays and a single storey, in the centre is the house with two bays and two storeys, and to the right is the former byre, in one bay and one storey. Above the shop doorway is a dated lintel, and the windows in the house are sashes. At the rear is a large cart entrance. Inside the former barn are three pairs of upper crucks, and there is one pair inside the former byre.	II
Solway View; 54.89845°N 3.08158°W	—	Late 17th or early 18th century (probable)	A house in rendered clay with projecting plinth stones, raised in brick in the 19th century, and with a slate roof. It has two storeys and three bays, with an outshut on the front. Most of the windows are sashes with a casement window in the outshut.	II
North View and former stable 54.88604°N 3.13495°W	—	Early 18th century (probable)	A house and former stable, now incorporated, rendered, mostly in clay, and the porch and stable in brick. It is in a single-storey, the house has three bays with the stable to the left. The lean-to porch has a side door, and the windows in the house are sashes. The former stable contains a plank door and a loft door.	II
The Limes and barn 54.88671°N 3.13634°W	—	Late 18th century	A farmhouse and barn in brick with green slate roofs. The house has a chamfered plinth, quoins, and a cornice. It is in two storeys and three bays, and contains a doorway and sash windows with architraves. The barn is to the right, it is L-shaped, and has a doorway with a quoined surround and an entablature with a keystone, windows, more doorways, and ventilation slits.	II
Laurel House; 54.89827°N 3.08392°W	—	Late 18th or early 19th century	A stuccoed house on a squared plinth with a Welsh slate roof, in two storeys and three bays. The doorway has pilasters and a fanlight, and the windows are sashes in architraves. On the right wall are hung slates.	II
Croft House Farmhouse; 54.89818°N 3.08622°W	—	Early 19th century	A brick farmhouse on a chamfered stone plinth with quoins and a green slate roof. There are two storeys and a symmetrical front of three bays. The central doorway has pilasters, and a semicircular fanlight with a moulded surround and a false keystone. The windows are sashes in moulded architraves.	II
War memorial 54.89826°N 3.08503°W		1920	The war memorial is in the churchyard of St Peter's Church. It is in Cornish granite, and consists of a wheel-head cross with a tapering shaft on a four-sided plinth. On the front of the cross is Celtic knotwork. The shaft and plinth carry inscriptions and the names of those lost in the two World Wars.	II
