= Listed buildings in Burton-in-Kendal =

Burton-in-Kendal is a civil parish in Westmorland and Furness, Cumbria, England. It contains 32 listed buildings that are recorded in the National Heritage List for England. Of these, one is listed at Grade I, the highest of the three grades, one is at Grade II*, the middle grade, and the others are at Grade II, the lowest grade. The parish contains the village of Burton-in-Kendal and the surrounding countryside. The Lancaster Canal passes through the parish, and the listed buildings associated with this are a bridge, an aqueduct, and a milestone. The other listed buildings are located in the village, apart from two boundary stones, a milestone, and a farmhouse. In the village, the listed buildings include houses and associated structures, a church and items in the churchyard, hotels, public houses, a market cross, and a commemorative lamp post.

== Key ==
Grade	Criteria
I	Buildings of exceptional interest, sometimes considered to be internationally important
II*	Particularly important buildings of more than special interest
II	Buildings of national importance and special interest

== Buildings ==
Name and location	Photograph	Date	Notes	Grade
St James' Church; 54.18591°N 2.72092°W		12th century	The oldest parts of the church are the base of the tower and the northwest corner of the nave. Alterations and additions were made in the following centuries, the church was restored in 1844 when the clerestory was added, and in 1872 the chancel south arcade was rebuilt. The church is built in limestone with sandstone dressings and slate roofs. It consists of a nave with a clerestory, aisles, a south porch, a chancel with north and south chapels, and a west tower. The tower has three stages and an embattled parapet, and most of the windows are in Perpendicular style.	I
1–5 Main Street; 54.18126°N 2.72158°W		17th century (probable)	A terrace of five cottages with two storeys, the upper storey overhanging, and a green slate roof with a stone ridge. Nos. 1–3 are stuccoed, partly over timber framing, and Nos. 4 and 5 have a roughcast upper floor and a stuccoed ground floor. The upper floor of Nos. 4 and 5 is carried on two Tuscan columns and a timber upright. Most of the windows are sashes, and on the front facing The Square is a Venetian window.	II
Burton Hall; 54.18408°N 2.72219°W	—	17th century	A house that was altered and extended in the 19th century, it is in stone on a plinth, and has a green slate roof with a stone ridge, copings and finials. There are two storeys, three bays, and a single-storey extension to the right. In the centre is a two-storey gabled porch, the windows are 19th-century casements, and there are two blocked fire windows. At the rear are two mullioned windows, and a single-storey gabled porch with a ball finial.	II
Glenlea and Aysgarth; 54.18164°N 2.72157°W		17th century (probable)	A pair of roughcast cottages that have a green slate roof with a stone ridge. There are two storeys, the upper storey overhanging, and each cottage has one bay. Glenlea has a bay window in the ground floor and a casement above, and Aysgarth has a sash window in each floor. The upper storey is supported by two massive circular stone columns and a smaller rectangular column.	II
Dalton Old Hall Farmhouse; 54.17126°N 2.70608°W	—	1666	A farmhouse that was later altered and extended, it is pebbledashed with stone dressings, a corniced ogee gutter, and a green slate roof with copings. The house has a T-shaped plan, with two storeys, a south front of three bays, a left extension, and two rear wings. The doorway has a chamfered surround and an initialled, dated and decorated lintel, and the windows are sashes.	II
Hordley House; 54.17944°N 2.72215°W	—	Late 17th or early 18th century (probable)	A roughcast house with stone dressings and a green slate roof with a stone ridge. There are two storeys and three bays. The central doorway has a segmental head. The windows in the lower floor are casements, and in the upper floor they are mullioned and transomed cross windows.	II
Manor House; 54.18016°N 2.72179°W		1701	A stone house on a plinth, with corniced gutters and a slate roof with a stone ridge. There are two storeys, and the main part to the right also has attics. The main part has three bays, and a doorway with a plain surround and a bracketed cornice. The windows are sashes in plain surrounds, two of the attic windows being blind. The part to the left has a three-light window in the ground floor and a Venetian window above.	II
Hutton House; 54.18081°N 2.72155°W	—	1728	A stone house on a plinth, with a slate roof and two storeys with cellars. Four semicircular stone steps lead up to a central doorway that has an architrave, a pulvinated frieze, and a pediment. Above the door is an inscribed plaque with a moulded surround and a round head. The top half of a mullioned window lights the cellar, and the other windows are 20th-century casements in moulded architraves.	II
Laurel Cottage; 54.18081°N 2.72187°W	—	18th century or earlier	A stone house with a green slate roof, two storeys and three irregular bays. The sash windows and the doorway have plain surrounds.	II
The Globe; 54.18172°N 2.72157°W	—	18th century (probable)	A roughcast house with a green slate roof, two storeys and two bays. In the centre is a doorway with Ionic pilasters, an entablature and a cornice, and the windows are sashes.	II
Hill House; 54.18204°N 2.72170°W	—	18th century (probable)	A roughcast house that has a green slate roof with a stone ridge. There are two storeys, the main part being higher than the part to the right. The main part has a central lattice porch and doorway, and sash windows. The part to the right has a doorway, a casement window and two small fixed windows.	II
Market Cross; 54.18150°N 2.72134°W		18th century	The market cross stands in The Square, and is in limestone. It consists of a tapering column surmounted by a cornice and with a moulded square base. The column is on a plinth with a chamfered base on three octagonal steps.	II
Walls, gatepiers, gates and lamps, Burton House; 54.17958°N 2.72191°W		Late 18th century (probable)	The walls are in limestone and the piers are in sandstone. Flanking the entrance to the drive are two pairs of square gate piers with chamfered edges and bases, and cornices and shallow pyramidal tops. On the outer piers are cast iron lampposts with octagonal lanterns. From the gate piers, curving walls on a plinth with coping, lead to similar end piers.	II
Mansion House; 54.17954°N 2.72215°W	—	Late 18th century	A limestone house on a low plinth, later divided into two dwellings, with chamfered quoins and a green slate roof. There are two storeys with an attic, and the front facing the road has three bays. In the centre is a doorway with Tuscan pilasters and a pediment, and the windows are sashes. On the north gabled front are four bays, there is a Diocletian window in the attic, and at the rear is a round-headed stair window.	II
Royal Hotel; 54.18170°N 2.72130°W		Late 18th century	The hotel is in stone with a partly hipped green slate roof. There are two storeys, a main front of nine bays, and three bays on the right return. The main doorway has a moulded architrave and a pediment on brackets. Most of the windows on the front are sashes with stone lintels, and there is also a shop window with pilasters and a cornice. In the right return are Venetian windows and a doorway that has a plain surround, a fanlight, and a cornice on brackets.	II
The Coach House; 54.18039°N 2.72152°W		Late 18th century	The former coach house has been converted into three dwellings. It is in limestone with sandstone dressings, quoins, a string course, and a hipped green slate roof. There are three storeys and six bays. In the centre of the ground floor are two elliptical arches, now filled with doors and windows, that have chamfered surrounds and keystones. Above are two French windows in arches with keystones and impost blocks, and an oculus, all under a moulded pediment on consoles. The other windows are 20th-century replacements.	II
Burton House; 54.17956°N 2.72115°W		c. 1795	The house, later divided into three dwellings, is in sandstone, partly stuccoed, and has a green slate roof. The central block is on a plinth, and has bands, modillioned eaves, 2 1/2 storeys, cellars, and three bays. It is flanked by low recessed two-bay links to single-bay pedimented two-storey pavilions. The windows are sashes, and the main windows on the front have pediments. On the left return of the central block in the main entrance, which has a Venetian form, a moulded surround, and a keystone.	II*
1–4 The Square; 54.18149°N 2.72174°W	—	c. 1810	A terrace of four houses forming the west side of The Square. They are stuccoed with stone dressings, and have a modillioned eaves cornice and a Welsh slate roof. They have three storeys and ten bays. Above the doorways of Nos. 3 and 4 are pediments. The entry to No. 2 is through a carriage arch that has an elliptical head, a keystone, and moulded impost blocks. The windows are sashes.	II
Post Office and three houses 54.18149°N 2.72116°W		c. 1810	A row of four stone houses with a slate roof forming the east side of The Square. They are on a plinth, and have quoins and a modillioned cornice. The houses have three storeys and a total of five bays. Nos. 1 and 2 have paired doorways with plain surrounds and a moulded pediment, and Nos. 3 and 4 have paired doorways without a pediment. The windows are sashes in plain surrounds.	II
Braithwaite Bridge; 54.19111°N 2.73256°W		c. 1816	This is bridge No. 146, an accommodation bridge, over the Lancaster Canal. It is in limestone and consists of a single elliptical arch with a string course, rusticated voussoirs, and keystones. The parapets are curved in plan and have flat tops and end pilasters. The distance between the parapets is about 3.5 metres (11 ft).	II
Milestone; 54.19184°N 2.73259°W	—	c. 1816	The milestone is on the side of the Lancaster Canal. It is in limestone, and consists of an upright stone with a round head. On the sides are oval panels inscribed with numbers representing the distances in miles to Lancaster and to Kendal.	II
New Mill Aqueduct; 54.18938°N 2.73164°W		c. 1816	The aqueduct carries the Lancaster Canal over a road. It is in limestone and consists of a single horseshoe arch with voussoirs, keystones, and curved, ramped retaining walls ending in pilasters.	II
Boundary stone 54.19644°N 2.72209°W	—	Early 19th century (probable)	The stone marks the boundary between the parishes of Burton-in-Kendal and Holme, It consists of an upright stone with a flat top, deep chamfers, and pyramidal stops on the front. It is inscribed with the names of the parishes.	II
Boundary stone 54.18298°N 2.67328°W	—	Early 19th century (probable)	The stone marks the boundary between Dalton and Hutton Roof. It is limestone, and consists of an inscribed upright stone with a round head and chamfers to the front corners. On the top is a benchmark.	II
Devenant House; 54.18090°N 2.72151°W	—	Early 19th century	A house in ashlar limestone on a plinth, with a band, modillioned eaves, corniced gutters, and a green slate roof, partly hipped. There are two storeys with attics, and a symmetrical front of three bays. The windows are sashes, and the attic windows are blind. The central doorway has a fanlight and a cornice on brackets.	II
Fern Bank and cottage 54.18034°N 2.72199°W	—	Early 19th century	Originally a bank, later a house with a cottage to the right, the building is stuccoed with stone dressings and corniced eaves. There are two storeys, the house has four bays, and the cottage has one. The doorway to the house has Tuscan pilasters and an entablature, and above the door is a fanlight. In the fourth bay is a carriage arch with a segmental head, and the windows are sashes in plain surrounds. The doorway in the cottage has a semicircular hood on moulded consoles. To the left is a canted bay window, and in the upper floor is a sash window.	II
Kings Arms Hotel; 54.18100°N 2.72170°W		Early 19th century (probable)	The hotel was later extended to the left, and is roughcast with a green slate roof. There are three storeys and four bays. The doorway has a moulded surround and a bracketed cornice, and the windows are sashes.	II
Milestone; 54.17366°N 2.72494°W	—	Early 19th century (probable)	The milestone is in sandstone and consists of an upright stone with chamfers on a semicircular inscribed base. On the chamfers are inscribed cast iron plaques.	II
The Square House; 54.18134°N 2.72129°W	—	Early 19th century (probable)	A stone house on a plinth, with a string course, a slate roof, three storeys and three bays. There are two doorways and the windows are sashes.	II
Coach house, stables and hayloft, Burton Hall; 54.18392°N 2.72199°W	—	Mid 19th century (probable)	The building is in roughcast stone with limestone dressings and a green slate roof with a stone ridge. It contains a doorway, a casement window, and a wagon door with voussoirs and a keystone. On the right gable is a ball finial.	II
Privies, Burton Hall; 54.18387°N 2.72241°W	—	Mid 19th century (probable)	The privies are in stone with a green slate roof. The entrances are on the sides. One entrance has a plain door, a plain surround, and a flat lintel, and the other has a pointed head with voussoirs, and a door decorated with studs.	II
Lamp post 54.18151°N 2.72151°W	—	1863	The lamp post was erected in The Square to commemorate the marriage of the future King Edward VII. It is in cast iron, with a square festooned tapering plinth, and a fluted tapering post with a petalled base, scrolled brackets, and a square lantern. On the plinth is an inscribed plaque.	II
