= Listed buildings in Holme, Cumbria =

Legally protected buildings in an English civil parish

Holme is a civil parish in Westmorland and Furness, Cumbria, England. It contains 14 listed buildings that are recorded in the National Heritage List for England. All the listed buildings are designated at Grade II, the lowest of the three grades, which is applied to "buildings of national importance and special interest". The parish contains the village of Holme and the surrounding countryside. The Lancaster Canal passes through the parish, and nine structures on the canal are listed, eight bridges and a milepost. The other listed buildings are a house, a farmhouse, two boundary stones, and a milepost on a road.

== Buildings ==
Name and location	Photograph	Date	Notes
Pinders Farmhouse and barn 54.20250°N 2.73179°W	—	17th century	The farmhouse and barn are in stone with a green slate roof. The house has two storeys, three irregular bays, and a single-storey extension at right angles to the right. The windows are of different types, including sashes and casements, and some are mullioned. The barn to the left has a wagon door and ventilation slits.
Holme Mill Bridge; 54.19722°N 2.72712°W		c. 1816	An accommodation bridge crossing the Lancaster Canal, it is in limestone, and consists of a single elliptical arch. The bridge has rusticated voussoirs and keystones. The parapets are ramped with a curved plan, and they end in pilasters. The bridge is about 3.5 metres (11 ft) wide.
Sheerness Bridge; 54.19906°N 2.72725°W		c. 1816	The bridge carries Sheernest Lane over the Lancaster Canal, it is in limestone, and consists of a single elliptical arch. The bridge has rusticated voussoirs and keystones. The parapets are arched and end in pilasters. The bridge is about 3.5 metres (11 ft) wide.
Holme Turnpike Bridge; 54.20177°N 2.72722°W		c. 1816	The bridge carries Burton Road over the Lancaster Canal. It is in limestone, and consists of a single elliptical arch. The bridge has rusticated voussoirs and keystones. The parapets are arched and end in pilasters, and the carriageway is about 6 metres (20 ft) wide.
Janson's Bridge; 54.20425°N 2.72766°W		c. 1816	An accommodation bridge crossing the Lancaster Canal, it is in limestone, and consists of a single elliptical arch. The bridge has rusticated voussoirs and keystones. The parapets are ramped, they have flat tops, and end in pilasters. The bridge is about 3.5 metres (11 ft) wide.
Holme Park Bridge; 54.20773°N 2.72783°W		c. 1816	The bridge carries Park Lane over the Lancaster Canal, it is in limestone, and consists of a single elliptical arch. The bridge has rusticated voussoirs and keystones. The parapets are ramped, they have flat tops, and end in pilasters. The bridge is about 3.5 metres (11 ft) wide.
Holme Warehouse Bridge; 54.20609°N 2.72783°W		c. 1816	An accommodation bridge crossing the Lancaster Canal, it is in limestone, and consists of a single elliptical arch. The bridge has rusticated voussoirs and keystones. The parapets are ramped, they have flat tops, and end in pilasters. The bridge is about 3.5 metres (11 ft) wide.
Nelson's Bridge; 54.21005°N 2.72709°W		c. 1816	An accommodation bridge crossing the Lancaster Canal, it is in limestone, and consists of a single elliptical arch. The bridge has rusticated voussoirs and keystones. The parapets are ramped, they have flat tops, and end in pilasters. The bridge is about 3.5 metres (11 ft) wide.
Garth's Bridge; 54.21369°N 2.72476°W		c. 1816	An accommodation bridge crossing the Lancaster Canal, it is in limestone, and consists of a single elliptical arch. The bridge has rusticated voussoirs and keystones. The parapets are ramped, they have flat tops, and end in pilasters. The bridge is about 3.5 metres (11 ft) wide.
Milepost on Lancaster Canal; 54.20515°N 2.72794°W		c. 1816	The milepost is on the towpath of the canal. It is in limestone, and consists of an upright stone with two oval panels containing numbers that represent the distances in miles to Lancaster and to Kendal.
Boundary stone 54.21617°N 2.71915°W	—	Early 19th century (probable)	The stone is on the east side of the A6070 road, and marks the boundary between the parish of Holme and the former parish of Farleton. It is in limestone, and consists of an upright stone with a flat top, deep chamfers and pyramid stops to the front corners. It is inscribed with the names of the parishes.
Boundary stone 54.19656°N 2.72205°W	—	Early 19th century (probable)	The stone is on the east side of the A6070 road, and marks the boundary between the parishes of Holme and Burton. It is in limestone, and consists of an upright stone with a flat top, deep chamfers and pyramid stops to the front corners. It is inscribed with the names of the parishes.
Bridge House and barn 54.20280°N 2.73016°W	—	Early 19th century (probable)	The house and barn are in stone with a green slate roof. The house has two storeys and three bays. On the front is a gabled porch, and the windows are sashes. The barn has a cart entrance, a doorway and a small casement window.
Milepost on A6070 road 54.21040°N 2.72186°W	—	1826	The milepost is on the east side of the A6070 road. It is in cast iron, and has a half-hexagonal plan, fluted faces and a domed top. It indicates the distances in miles to Burton and to Kendal.
