= Studholme, Cumbria =

Hamlet in Cumbria, England

Coordinates: 54.894°N 3.155°W

Studholme
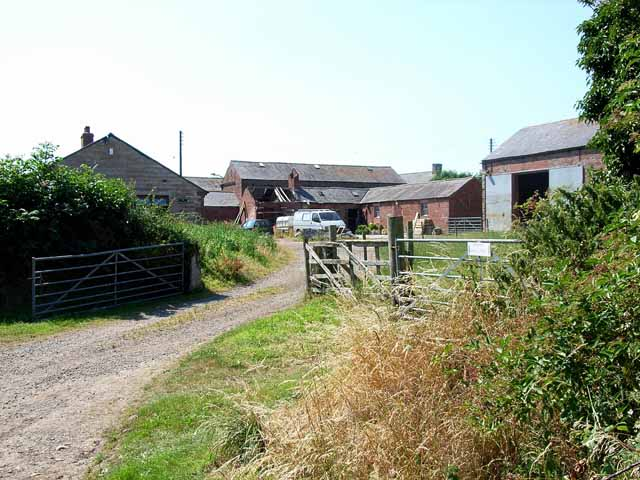
- Studholme Farm

- Location in Allerdale, Cumbria Location within Cumbria
- OS grid reference: NY259560
- Civil parish: Kirkbampton
- Unitary authority: Cumberland
- Ceremonial county: Cumbria
- Region: North West
- Country: England
- Sovereign state: United Kingdom
- Post town: WIGTON
- Postcode district: CA7
- Dialling code: 016973
- Police: Cumbria
- Fire: Cumbria
- Ambulance: North West
- UK Parliament: Penrith and Solway

Studholme is a hamlet in the English county of Cumbria.

Studholme is located about a mile north-west of the village of Little Bampton.
