= Listed buildings in Boltons =

Boltons is a civil parish in the Cumberland district in Cumbria, England. It contains 14 listed buildings that are recorded in the National Heritage List for England. Of these, one is listed at Grade I, the highest of the three grades, one is at Grade II*, the middle grade, and the others are at Grade II, the lowest grade. The parish contains the village of Boltongate and smaller settlements, and is otherwise completely rural. Most of the listed buildings are houses with associated structures, farmhouses and farm buildings. The other listed buildings are a church, its former rectory, a war memorial, and four milestones provided for the Carlisle-Cockermouth Turnpike.

== Key ==
Grade	Criteria
I	Buildings of exceptional interest, sometimes considered to be internationally important
II*	Particularly important buildings of more than special interest
II	Buildings of national importance and special interest

== Buildings ==
Name and location	Photograph	Date	Notes	Grade
All Saints Church; 54.75594°N 3.19858°W		Late 14th century	The church is built on the plinth of an earlier church. It is in limestone, the nave has a roof of sandstone slate, and the chancel a roof of green slate. The church consists of a nave with north and south porches, transept chapels, a chancel with a north vestry, and a twin bellcote at the west end. There is also a stair tower with a stone-slate spire, leading to a walkway with an embattled parapet, and a north rood turret.	I
The Rectory; 54.75472°N 3.19858°W	—	Early 15th century	Originally a rectory, later a private house, it was extended in the early 17th century and again in 1889. The house is rendered with a sandstone string course and quoins and a green slate roof. The oldest part has thick walls, two storeys, one bay, and a tower at the east end. It contains a slit window in the ground floor and a sash window above. The central section, dating from 1889, is two storeys and two bays. To the right and lower is the 17th-century range, with two storeys and three bays. The windows in the newer parts are sashes. Inside the oldest part, the ground floor is barrel vaulted, and in the 17th-century range is an inglenook.	II
Weary Hail; 54.76532°N 3.21721°W	—	1576	The hall, later used as a farmhouse, has been extended, and is in two ranges at right angles giving it an L-shaped plan. The building is in limestone, partly roughcast, with green slate roofs. The older part has thick walls, and is in three storeys, but only the ground floor is occupied. The newer range has three storeys and an attic, with two bays and a staircase bay to the right. Many of the openings, including mullioned windows, are blocked. In the newer range is a doorway with pilasters, a pediment, and a fanlight, and the windows are sashes.	II*
Thackthwaite Hall and byre 54.78116°N 3.14530°W	—	1700	A farmhouse attached to a former older house, later used as a byre. The whole building is in rubble, partly roughcast, with a roof of green slate and some Welsh slate, and both parts have two storeys. The former older house has three bays, mullioned windows (some of which are blocked), and a doorway with a chamfered surround and an inscribed lintel. The later building dates from the 18th century, it has three bays, an eaves cornice, a parapet, a 20th-century porch, and sash windows.	II
Wellrash Farmhouse and barn 54.76393°N 3.17635°W	—	Late 16th century	The building is rendered with a green slate roof. The house has two storeys and three bays, with a byre to the left and a barn to the right. The house has mullioned windows, fire windows and a casement window, and the doorway has a chamfered surround. The barn has doorways, loft doors, and ventilation slits.	II
Boltongate Farm; 54.75628°N 3.19676°W	—	1687	Originally a farmhouse, later a private house, it is in roughcast sandstone with a green slate roof, and in two storeys. There are four bays with a rear extension, giving the building an L-shaped plan. The windows are mullioned, and there are two half-plank doors.	II
Milestone; 54.78738°N 3.18862°W	—	Late 18th or early 19th century	The milestone was provided for the Carlisle-Cockermouth Turnpike. It is in sandstone, and has a round top, a curved face, and a cast iron plate. The plate is inscribed with the distances in miles to Carlisle, Wigton and Cockermouth.	II
Milestone; 54.77815°N 3.20619°W	—	Late 18th or early 19th century	The milestone was provided for the Carlisle-Cockermouth Turnpike. It is in sandstone, and has a round top, a curved face, and a cast iron plate. The plate is inscribed with the distances in miles to Carlisle, Wigton and Cockermouth.	II
Milestone; 54.76927°N 3.22581°W	—	Late 18th or early 19th century	The milestone was provided for the Carlisle-Cockermouth Turnpike. It is in sandstone, and has a round top, a curved face, and a cast iron plate. The plate is inscribed with the distances in miles to Carlisle, Wigton and Cockermouth.	II
Milestone; 54.75953°N 3.24331°W	—	Late 18th or early 19th century	The milestone was provided for the Carlisle-Cockermouth Turnpike. It is in sandstone, and has a round top, a curved face, and a cast iron plate. The plate is inscribed with the distances in miles to Carlisle, Wigton and Cockermouth.	II
Thistlebottom; 54.74177°N 3.10772°W	—	Late 18th or early 19th century	A limestone farmhouse with sandstone quoins, a green slate roof, and a coped gable on the left. It has two storeys and three bays, with a single-bay extension to the right. The sash windows and the doorway have painted stone surrounds.	II
Bolton Park; 54.76301°N 3.14956°W	—	1840	A stone farmhouse on a chamfered plinth with eaves modillions and a hipped slate roof. It has two storeys and three bays with a rear extension. There is a porch with four fluted Doric columns and a modillion cornice. Above the door is a fanlight. The windows are mullioned with hood moulds, some of which incorporate carved heads. In the extension is a sash window.	II
Gate piers, Bolton Park; 54.76311°N 3.14936°W	—	1840	A pair of square gate piers in ashlar. They are surmounted by carved seated greyhounds.	II
Boltongate War Memorial; 54.75628°N 3.19840°W	—	c. 1920	The war memorial is in the churchyard of All Saints Church. It is in grey granite, and consists of a wheel-head Celtic cross on a wide shaft and a tapering four-sided plinth. On the cross-head is knotwork carving, and on the shaft and plinth are an inscription and the names of those lost in the First World War. In front is a stone block with a slate plaque carrying an inscription and the names of those lost in the Second World War.	II

== Notes and references ==
=== Sources ===
- Historic England, "Church of All Saints, Boltongate (1312157)", National Heritage List for England
- Historic England, "The Rectory, Boltongate (1144465)", National Heritage List for England
- Historic England, "Weary Hail, Boltongate (1137761)", National Heritage List for England
- Historic England, "Thackthwaite Hall and adjoining byre, Boltongate (1312184)", National Heritage List for England
- Historic England, "Wellrash Farmhouse and adjoining barn, Boltongate (1144467)", National Heritage List for England
- Historic England, "Boltongate Farm (not a farmhouse), Boltongate (1137753)", National Heritage List for England
- Historic England, "Milestone (on north side of former A595), Boltongate (1144466)", National Heritage List for England
- Historic England, "Milestone west of Percy Hill, Boltongate (1144464)", National Heritage List for England
- Historic England, "Milestone east of Pink House Hotel, Boltongate (1238713)", National Heritage List for England
- Historic England, "Milestone east of Aldersceugh, Boltongate (1312188)", National Heritage List for England
- Historic England, "Thistlebottom, Boltongate (1144463)", National Heritage List for England
- Historic England, "Bolton Park, Boltongate (1144461)", National Heritage List for England
- Historic England, "Gate piers south-east of Bolton Park, Boltongate (1144462)", National Heritage List for England
- Historic England, "Boltongate War Memorial, Boltongate (1457953)", National Heritage List for England
- Historic England, Listed Buildings
- Hyde, Matthew; Pevsner, Nikolaus (2010) [1967], Cumbria, The Buildings of England, New Haven and London: Yale University Press, ISBN 978-0-300-12663-1
