= St Michael's Church, Beetham =

Coordinates: 54.2094°N 2.7741°W

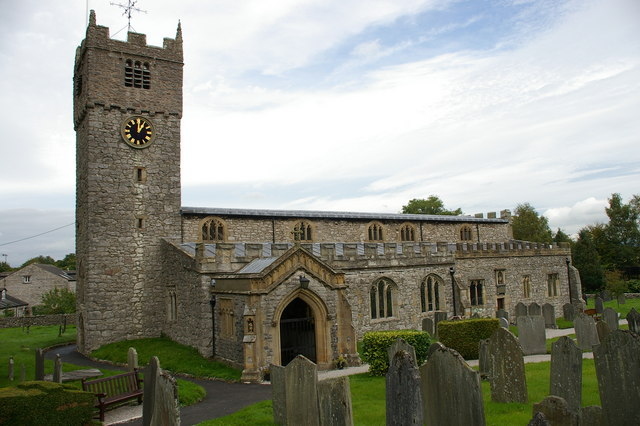
- St Michael's Church, Beetham, from the southwest

- Location in Cumbria
- OS grid reference: SD 496,796
- Location: Beetham, Cumbria
- Country: England
- Denomination: Anglican
- Website: St Michael, Beetham

History
- Status: Parish church

Architecture
- Functional status: Active
- Heritage designation: Grade I
- Designated: 12 February 1962
- Architectural type: Church
- Style: Norman, Gothic

Specifications
- Materials: Mainly limestone with sandstone dressings

Administration
- Province: York
- Diocese: Carlisle
- Archdeaconry: Westmoreland and Furness
- Deanery: Kendal
- Parish: Beetham

Clergy
- Vicar: Andrew B. Norman

St Michael's Church is in the village of Beetham, Cumbria, England. It is an active Anglican parish church in the deanery of Kendal, the archdeaconry of Westmoreland and Furness, and the diocese of Carlisle. The church is recorded in the National Heritage List for England as a designated Grade I listed building.

== History ==
It is possible that the oldest existing part of the church, the lower part of the tower, dates from the Anglo-Saxon era. The south aisle was added in about 1200, and the chancel was extended during the 13th century. In the following century the Beetham chapel was added, the south aisle was widened in the 15th century, and in the 16th century the top stage of the tower was built. In the 1870s the church was restored and a south porch was added. In the Buildings of England series, Hyde and Pevsner state that this was carried out by Joseph Bintley, whereas Price attributes it to the Lancaster architects Paley and Austin.

== Architecture ==
=== Exterior ===
The church is constructed in rubble, mainly limestone, with sandstone dressings. It is roofed in lead. The plan is rectangular, incorporating a nave and chancel with a clerestory, north and south aisles, a north vestry and a south chapel. The church also has a south porch, and a west tower in two stages. The lower stage of the tower contains a west doorway dating from the 14th century, above which is a two-light window. The upper stage is slightly corbelled-out and contains three-light bell openings. At the top is a battlemented parapet with crocketted pinnacles and a 20th-century weathervane. At the east end of the church, the chancel has a 19th-century five-light window, and both aisles contain a 15th-century three-light window. At the west end is a 15th-century three-light window to the left of the tower, and a late 14th-century two-light window to the right. On the south side of the church is a gabled porch, and two- or three-light windows. On the north side is a doorway and five 15th-century three-light windows. All the windows are in Perpendicular style.

=== Interior ===
The south arcade is in Norman style with cylindrical piers and round arches. The north arcade dates from the 15th century, with octagonal piers and pointed arches. The octagonal font cover dates from 1636. Most of the other furnishings date from the 19th and 20th centuries. The south window in the southeast chapel contains fragments of medieval and 17th-century stained glass. These were re-set in the 1870s by Frederick Burrow, who also worked on other windows. The east window dates from 1881 and is by Heaton, Butler and Bayne. Some of the windows in the nave were designed by Shrigley and Hunt. The oldest monument is in the southeast chapel, a tomb with effigies dating from about 1490, which was damaged in 1647.

== External features ==
In the churchyard is a war memorial to the First World War, consisting of a sandstone Celtic-style cross standing on sandstone steps, and surrounded by limestone walls. A plaque has been added to commemorate the Second World War. It has been designated as a Grade II listed building.

== See also ==
- Grade I listed churches in Cumbria
- Grade I listed buildings in Cumbria
- Listed buildings in Beetham
- List of ecclesiastical works by Paley and Austin
