= St Michael's Church, Burgh by Sands =

Coordinates: 54.9221°N 3.0489°W

St Michael's Church
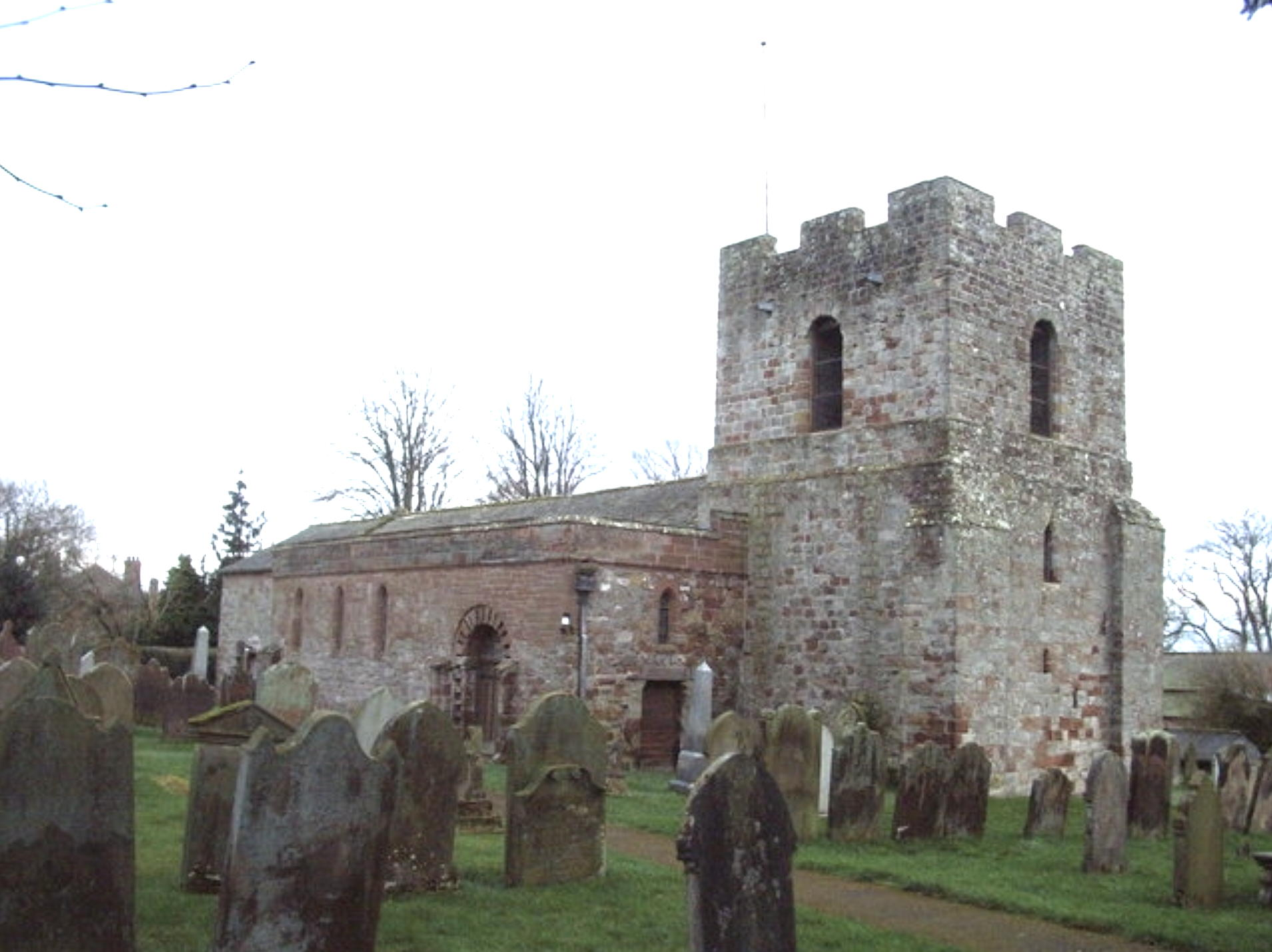
- St Michael's Church from the northwest

- Location in the former Carlisle district, Cumbria Location in Cumbria, England
- OS grid reference: NY 329 591
- Location: Burgh by Sands, Cumbria
- Country: England
- Denomination: Anglican
- Website: St Michael, Burgh-by-Sands

History
- Status: Parish church

Architecture
- Functional status: Active
- Heritage designation: Grade I
- Designated: 1 April 1957
- Architectural type: Church
- Style: Norman, Gothic, Gothic Revival

Specifications
- Materials: Sandstone, slate roofs

Administration
- Province: York
- Diocese: Carlisle
- Archdeaconry: Carlisle
- Deanery: Carlisle
- Parish: Burgh by Sands

St Michael's Church is in the village of Burgh by Sands, Cumbria, England. It is an active Anglican parish church in the deanery of Carlisle, the archdeaconry of Carlisle, and the diocese of Carlisle. Its benefice is united with those of St Andrew, Aikton, St Mary, Kirkandrews-on-Eden with Beaumont, and St Peter, Kirkbampton. The church is recorded in the National Heritage List for England as a designated Grade I listed building. It is a fortified church standing on the line of Hadrian's Wall, and is unique in having had two fortified towers (one of which has been converted into a vestry).

== History ==
The church dates probably from the late 12th century, with the north aisle added in about 1200. During the 14th century fortified towers were added to the west and east of the church. While the foundations for the west tower were being dug in 1360, the north arcade collapsed and had to be rebuilt. Later, probably in 1713, the east tower was reduced in height to two storeys, and was possibly used as a residence for the vicar. The church was restored in 1880–81. Edward I died in Burgh by Sands in 1307, and then lay in state in the church.

== Architecture ==
=== Exterior ===
St Michael's is constructed in Roman red and calciferous sandstone stones taken from Hadrian's Wall, and has a green slate roof. Its plan consists of a three-bay nave with a clerestory, a north aisle, a two-bay chancel with a two-storey vestry to the east (the former east tower), and a west tower. The tower is in three stages, it has very thick walls that contain steps within the west wall to a chamber, and a newel staircase at the southwest angle. There are clasping buttresses, and arrow slits in the bottom stage. The middle stage contains trefoil-headed lancet windows on each side, that on the east looking into the nave. The bell openings in the top stage are round-headed, and the parapet is battlemented. The north doorway was probably moved from the west of the church; it is Norman and has beakhead decoration. The rest of the medieval parts of the church are Early English in style, with lancet windows in the chancel and the north wall of the aisle. In the south wall of the nave are three blocked square-headed windows, and two 19th-century two-light windows. Between these windows is a large 18th-century aedicule monument. The vestry has a blocked 15th-century window, an 18th-century round-headed window and, in the upper storey, a 19th-century sash window.

=== Interior ===
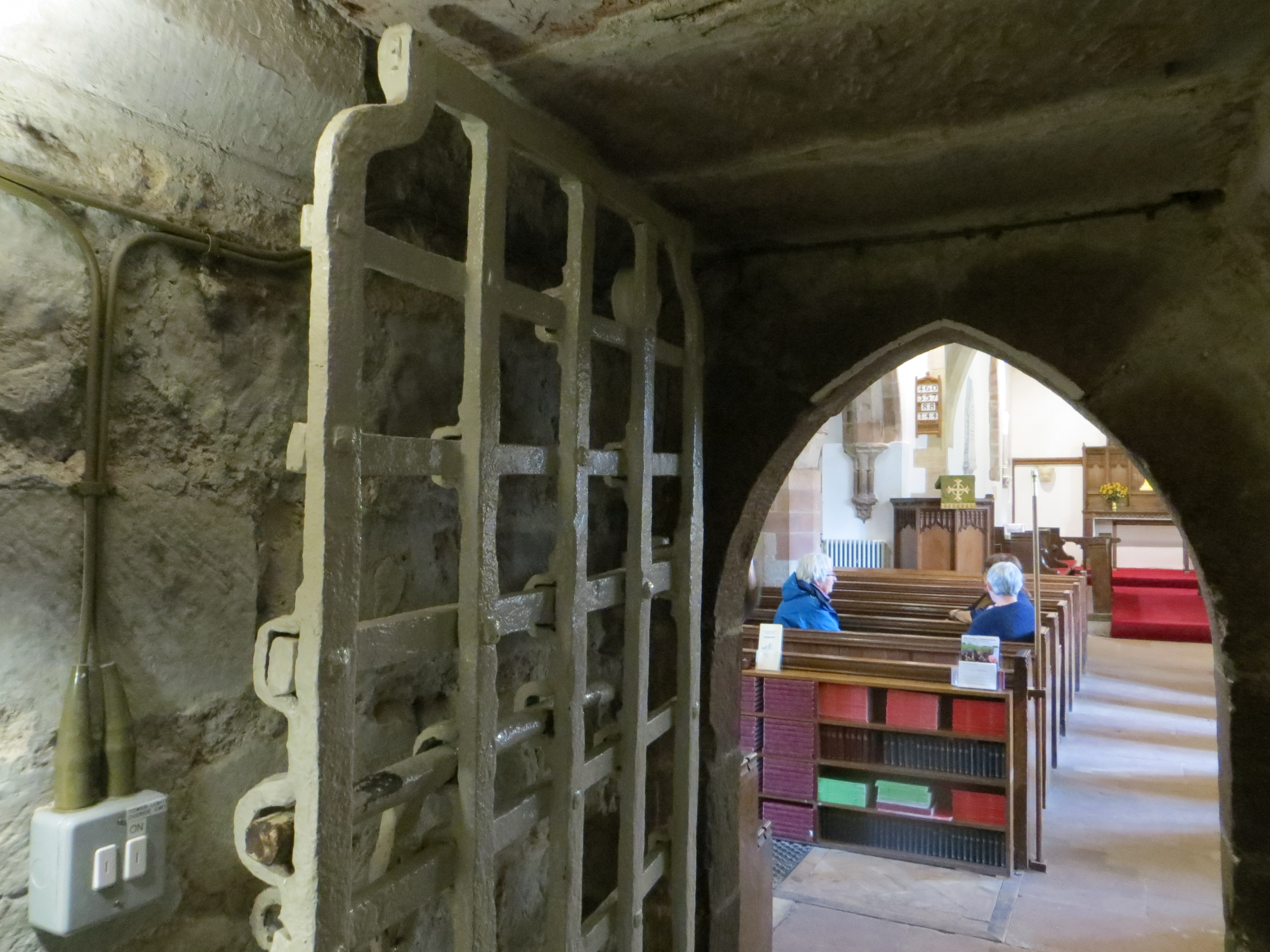
Yett between church and tower

Inside the church is a three-bay north arcade of pointed arches carried on octagonal columns. A small passage leads into the base of the tower; this is protected by an iron gate (or yett). The chancel arch dates from the 19th century, and contains a recess for an aumbry. In the east wall of the chancel to the left of the altar is a carved Roman corbel stone. To the right of the altar a door leads into the vestry. The stained glass in the north aisle windows dates from 1898 and is by Heaton, Butler and Bayne; one of these depicts Edward I. The rest of the stained glass dates from 1897, and is by Seward and Company.

== See also ==
- Grade I listed buildings in Cumbria
- Grade I listed churches in Cumbria
- Listed buildings in Burgh by Sands
