= St Andrew's Church, Aikton =

Coordinates: 54.8653°N 3.1194°W

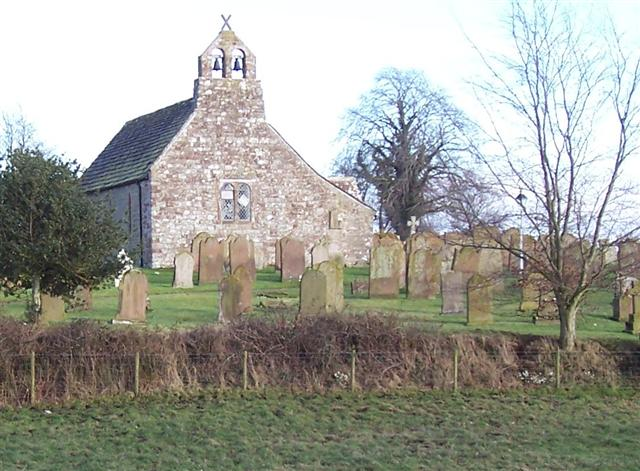
- St Andrew's Church, Aikton, from the west

- Location in Cumbria
- OS grid reference: NY 282 528
- Location: Aikton, Cumbria
- Country: England
- Denomination: Anglican
- Website: Aikton, St Andrew

History
- Status: Parish church
- Founded: 12th century
- Dedication: St Andrew

Architecture
- Functional status: Active
- Heritage designation: Grade I
- Designated: 11 April 1967
- Architectural type: Church
- Style: Norman, Gothic
- Completed: 1869

Specifications
- Materials: Sandstone, slate roofs

Administration
- Province: York
- Diocese: Carlisle
- Archdeaconry: Carlisle
- Deanery: Carlisle
- Parish: Aikton

Clergy
- Vicar: Revd Canon Gill Hart

St Andrew's Church stands near the village of Aikton, Cumbria, England. It is an active Anglican parish church in the deanery of Carlisle, the archdeaconry of Carlisle, and the diocese of Carlisle. Its benefice is united with those of St Michael, Burgh by Sands, St Mary, Kirkandrews-on-Eden with Beaumont, and St Peter, Kirkbampton. The church is recorded in the National Heritage List for England as a designated Grade I listed building.

== History ==
The church dates from the 12th century, with additions made in the 13th century. In the 18th century a south aisle was added, and in 1869 the church was restored at a cost of over £400 (equivalent to £40,000 in 2025).

== Architecture ==
=== Exterior ===
The church is built in red sandstone rubble. Many of the stones used in its construction were taken from Hadrian's Wall. The chancel roof is in Welsh slate, while the roof of the nave is in sandstone slates. The plan of the church consists of a four-bay nave with a south aisle and a gabled porch, and a two-bay chancel with a gabled vestry to the north. At the west end of the church is a double bellcote. In the north wall are lancet windows, the east window has two lights and there is a lancet window in the vestry. In the west wall is a blocked window. In the churchyard is a War Memorial commemorating servicemen in the parish who lost their lives in the First World War,

=== Interior ===
The roof dates from the 15th century; it is an open timber roof consisting of four king post trusses with side struts. The chancel arch is Norman in style. The font dates from the 14th century. It consists of a square bowl on a pedestal; the bowl has trefoils and plain rounded decorations. In the aisle is a steeply pointed trefoiled piscina. In the porch is a 13th-century coffin lid, inscribed with the carving of a sword. The organ was built by J. Charles Lee of Coventry.

== See also ==
- Grade I listed churches in Cumbria
- Listed buildings in Aikton
