= Listed buildings in Blennerhasset and Torpenhow =

Blennerhasset and Torpenhow is a civil parish in the Cumberland district in Cumbria, England. It contains 15 buildings that are recorded in the National Heritage List for England as designated listed buildings. Of these, one is listed at Grade I, the highest of the three grades, and the others are at Grade II, the lowest grade. The parish contains the villages of Blennerhasset and Torpenhow, and the smaller settlements of Kirkland Guards and Whitrigg, and is otherwise rural. Most of the listed buildings are houses, cottages, farmhouses and farm buildings, the latter including buildings on a model farm. The other listed buildings are a church, a milestone, and two war memorials.

== Key ==
Grade	Criteria
I	Buildings of exceptional interest, sometimes considered to be internationally important
II	Buildings of national importance and special interest

== Buildings ==
Name and location	Photograph	Date	Notes	Grade
St Michael's Church; 54.74690°N 3.23542°W		Early 12th century	The church was subsequently altered and restored on a number of occasions. It is built in sandstone with a green slate roof, and consists of a nave, aisles, a south porch, a north transept, and a chancel. On the west gable is a bellcote. The church has retained Norman features, including round-headed windows and a doorway, the arcades, and the chancel arch.	I
Torpenhow Hall; 54.74648°N 3.23447°W	—	Mid 16th century	Originally a manor house, later a farmhouse, it was altered in the 19th and 20th centuries. The house is rendered and has a green slate roof. There are two storeys, the main block has three bays, and there is a lower two-bay extension. The doorway has a chamfered surround and a Tudor arched head, and is inscribed. Most of the windows are sashes, and there is a mullioned window at the rear. Inside the house is an inglenook and a bressumer.	II
Low Wood Rook and former stables 54.75357°N 3.25525°W	—	1663	The house and attached stable was altered in the 18th century and used as an inn in the 19th century. It is rendered on a chamfered plinth and has a green slate roof. The main part has two storeys with an attic and two bays. The extension to the left has two storeys and two bays, and to the left of this is the former stable. The doorway has an inscribed lintel and a dated hood mould, and above the doorway is a blocked attic window with a pointed arch. The windows in the main part and the extension are sashes, and in the stable they are casements.	II
St Michael's Vicarage; 54.74676°N 3.23585°W	—	Late 17th century	The vicarage was altered and extended in the 18th and 19th centuries. It is roughcast with a Welsh slate roof, and has two storeys. The older part has three bays, and there are two later extensions to the right. The windows in the older part are mullioned and contain casements; the windows in the extensions are sashes.	II
Winder Cottages; 54.76225°N 3.27631°W		1678	A pair of roughcast cottages with a Welsh slate roof in two storeys. Both cottages have two bays, and No. 4 also has a single-bay extension to the right. They have doorways with chamfered surrounds and Tudor arched heads, casement windows and fire windows. Above the doorway of No. 3 is an inscription. There is a continuous hood mould on both floors. Inside the cottages are back-to-back inglenooks.	II
Peartree House; 54.76144°N 3.27846°W	—	1686	A roughcast house with large plinth stones and a green slate roof, it is in two storeys. The doorway has a chamfered surround, an inscribed Tudor arched head, and a hood mould. The windows on the front are casements, those on the ground floor having a continuous hood mould, and in the upper floor the hood moulds are separate. Above the doorway is a quatrefoil.	II
Whitrigg Hall; 54.73686°N 3.23608°W	—	1708	This consists of a farmhouse and attached barn, roughcast over rubble with projecting plinth stones and a green slate roof. The house has two storeys and three bays, and the barn extends to the left. The house has a doorway with a chamfered surround and a brick porch, and the windows are sashes. In the barn are doorways, a loft door, and an entrance with a segmental arch.	II
Kirkland Green and adjoining barn 54.75025°N 3.25788°W	—	Late 18th century	Both the farmland and barn have green slate roofs. The house is stuccoed, with an eaves cornice and quoins on a chamfered plinth. It is in two storeys with four bays, and has a doorway with an architrave and a pediment. The windows are sashes. The barn is built in rubble, and contains casement windows and round vents. To the left is a segmental archway.	II
Croft House; 54.74582°N 3.24006°W	—	Late 18th or early 19th century	The house is stuccoed, and has quoins, an eaves cornice, and a green slate roof. There are two storeys and three bays, and the windows are sashes. The central round-headed doorway has pilasters, a keystone and a radial fanlight.	II
Milestone; 54.74930°N 3.25889°W	—	Late 18th or early 19th century	The milestone was provided for the Carlisle-Cockermouth Turnpike. It is in sandstone, and has a round top, a curved face, and a cast iron plate. The plate is inscribed with the distances in miles to Carlisle, Wigton and Cockermouth.	II
Mechi Farmhouse; 54.75796°N 3.28474°W	—	1863–64	A farmhouse on a model farm in polychrome rubble with sandstone quoins and a Welsh slate roof. It has two storeys and three bays, with a single-bay extension at right angles to the right. There are two doorways, and the windows are sashes. In the extension, external stone steps lead up to a first floor doorway.	II
Barns and byres, Mechi Farm; 54.75845°N 3.28483°W	—	1863–64	The building incorporates the former turbine house tower and stables of a model farm. It is in polychrome rubble with sandstone quoins and a Welsh slate roof. The building consists of triple single-storey byres, two L-shaped stables and granary, an open-sided barn, and a low square tower. Some of the machinery remains inside.	II
Barn with clock tower, Mechi Farm; 54.75820°N 3.28433°W	—	1865	Part of a model farm, this contained a sheep shed, a coach house and a butching house, and has since been used for other purposes. It is in polychrome rubble with sandstone quoins and has a Welsh slate roof. It has two storeys and six bays, with a clock tower to the left.	II
Blennerhasset war memorial 54.76183°N 3.27852°W		1920–21	The plinth of the war memorial is in red sandstone, it is stepped, and has been rebuilt from the former market cross. Set on it is a pink granite base and a cross. The base is inscribed with the names of those lost in the two world wars.	II
Torpenhow war memorial 54.74690°N 3.23562°W	—	1921	The war memorial is in the churchyard of St Michael's Church to the west of the church. It is in Aberdeen granite, and consists of a wheel-head Celtic cross with a tapering shaft on a low stepped plinth. On the front of the cross and upper part of the shaft is Celtic strapwork decoration. On the lower part of the memorial is an inscription and the names of those lost in the First World War, and the rear contains the date and the names of those lost in the Second World War.	II
