= St James' Church, Burton-in-Kendal =

Coordinates: 54.1859°N 2.7210°W

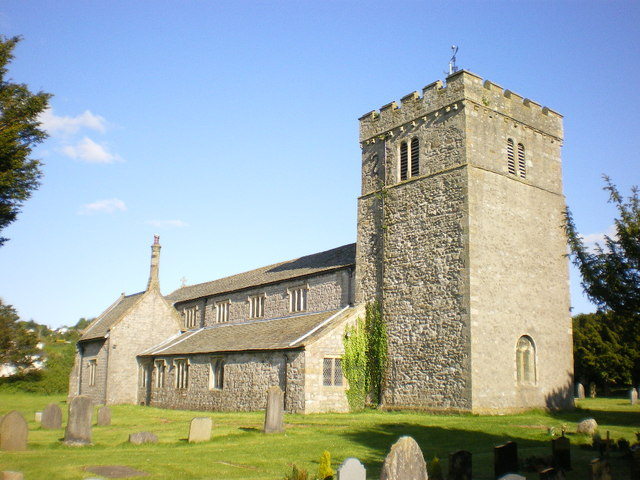
- St James' Church, Burton-in-Kendal, from the northwest

- Location in Cumbria
- OS grid reference: SD 531 769
- Location: Burton-in-Kendal, Cumbria
- Country: England
- Denomination: Anglican
- Churchmanship: Conservative Evangelical
- Website: St James, Burton

History
- Status: Parish church

Architecture
- Functional status: Active
- Heritage designation: Grade I
- Designated: 12 February 1962
- Style: Norman, Gothic

Specifications
- Materials: Limestone, slate roofs

Administration
- Province: York
- Diocese: Carlisle
- Archdeaconry: Westmorland and Furness
- Deanery: Kendal
- Parish: Burton-in-Kendal

Clergy
- Bishop: The Rt Revd Rod Thomas (AEO)
- Vicar: Revd Graham Burrows

St James' Church is in the village of Burton-in-Kendal, Cumbria, England. It is an active Anglican parish church in the deanery of Kendal, the archdeaconry of Westmorland and Furness, and the diocese of Carlisle. Its benefice is united with that of Holy Trinity, Holme. The church is recorded in the National Heritage List for England as a designated Grade I listed building.

== History ==
The lower part of the tower and the northwest corner of the nave date from the 12th century, and are Norman in style. The north chapel dates from the later part of the 13th century. In the following century the south aisle was built, and the north aisle and south chapel date from the late 15th or the 16th century. In 1844 the chancel and the north chapel were rebuilt, and the clerestory was added. In 1871 the Lancaster architects Paley and Austin carried out further alterations, including the removal of the gallery, adding a north vestry and organ chamber, replacing the seating, remodelling the pulpit, and adding a new font.

=== Present day ===
St James' Church is within the Conservative Evangelical tradition of the Church of England, and it has passed resolutions to show that it rejects the ordination of women. It receives alternative episcopal oversight from the Bishop of Ebbsfleet.

== Architecture ==
St James is constructed in limestone rubble with dressings in sandstone and limestone. The roof is made of slate. The plan consists of a nave with a clerestory, north and south aisles, a south porch, a chancel with north and south chapels, and a west tower. The tower is in three stages with a two-light west window, two-light bell openings, and an embattled parapet. Most of the windows are Perpendicular in style. Within the church, the pulpit is Jacobean. There is stained glass by Clayton and Bell, H. W. Bryans, Shrigley and Hunt, and by Lavers, Barraud and Westlake. Additionally, the church houses carved stone fragments dating back to the late 10th or 11th century.

== See also ==
- Grade I listed churches in Cumbria
- Grade I listed buildings in Cumbria
- Listed buildings in Burton-in-Kendal
- List of ecclesiastical works by Paley and Austin
- Media related to St James' Church, Burton-in-Kendal at Wikimedia Commons
