= St Michael's Church, Torpenhow =

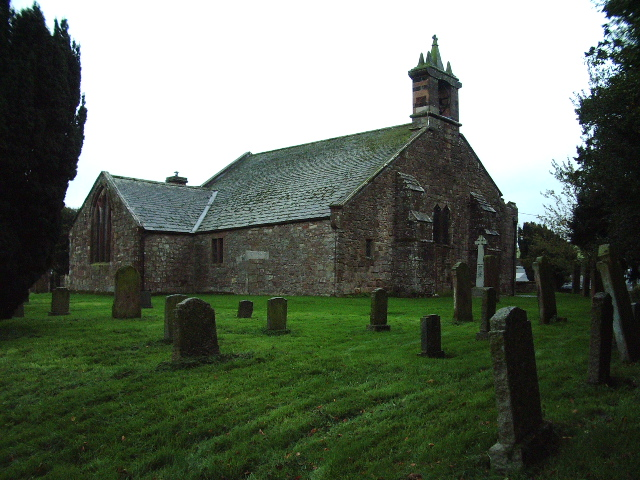
- St Michael's Church, Torpenhow, from the northwest
- St Michael's Church, Torpenhow
- 54.7469°N 3.2353°W
- OS grid reference: NY 205 398
- Location: Torpenhow, Cumbria
- Country: England
- Denomination: Anglican
- Website: The Binsey Team Ministry

History
- Status: Parish church
- Founded: Early 12th century
- Dedication: St Michael and All Angels

Architecture
- Functional status: Active
- Heritage designation: Grade I
- Designated: 11 April 1967
- Architectural type: Church
- Style: Norman
- Completed: 1913

Specifications
- Materials: Sandstone, green slate roofs

Administration
- Province: York
- Diocese: Carlisle
- Archdeaconry: West Cumberland
- Deanery: Derwent
- Parish: Torpenhow

Clergy
- Rector: Revd Tricia Rodgers
- Vicar: Revd Peter Streatfeild

St Michael's Church is in the civil parish of Blennerhasset and Torpenhow, Cumbria, England. It is an active Anglican church in the deanery of Derwent, the archdeaconry of West Cumberland, and the diocese of Carlisle. It is recorded in the National Heritage List for England as a designated Grade I listed building.

== History ==
The church dates from the early 12th century, with extensions later in that century and in the 13th century, alterations in the 15th and 17th centuries, and restorations in 1882 and 1913. It is thought that some of the stone used in the building came from the Roman fort at Old Carlisle. The architect carrying out the 1913 restoration said that he found "distinct traces of a Saxon building".

== Architecture ==
=== Structure ===
The church is built in sandstone with a roof of green slate. Its plan consists of a three-bay nave with north and south aisles and a north transept and a south porch, and a three-bay chancel. At the west end is an open bellcote. Within the porch is a blocked doorway, the present door having a Tudor-style surround. In the west wall is another blocked doorway, over which is a two-light window dating from the 15th century. Much of the architecture is Norman. The Norman features include round-headed windows in the north wall of the chancel, with similar, but blocked, windows in the south and east walls; the south doorway; and, inside the church, the arcades and the chancel arch. The chancel arch is carved with demon-like figures on the north side, and human and animals on the south side. In the south porch is a medieval gravestone; other similar gravestones have been used as lintels for the west window and for blocking the west door. The south aisle has a battlemented parapet. The ceiling of the nave was given to the church in 1689 by Thomas, the brother of the essayist Joseph Addison, and is thought to have come from the hall of a London Livery Company; it is painted with cupids and garlands. The north transept has an open timber roof dated 1614. The panelled ceiling in the chancel dates from the 19th or 20th century.

=== Fittings and furniture ===
The font has a carved Norman bowl on a later stem. In the south wall is a recess which probably formerly contained a medieval tomb effigy that is now in the south porch. In the east wall is an aumbry, and a piscina with a motif of the sun. A piscina with a possible Roman carving is close by. The pulpit is simple and Jacobean in style. Several carvings may reference Knights Templar origins. The panelled choir stalls date from 1882, while all the other furnishings are 20th century. The stained glass includes windows by Clayton and Bell.

== See also ==
- Grade I listed churches in Cumbria
- Listed buildings in Blennerhasset and Torpenhow
