= All Saints Church, Boltongate =

Coordinates: 54.7560°N 3.1986°W

All Saints' Church, Boltongate
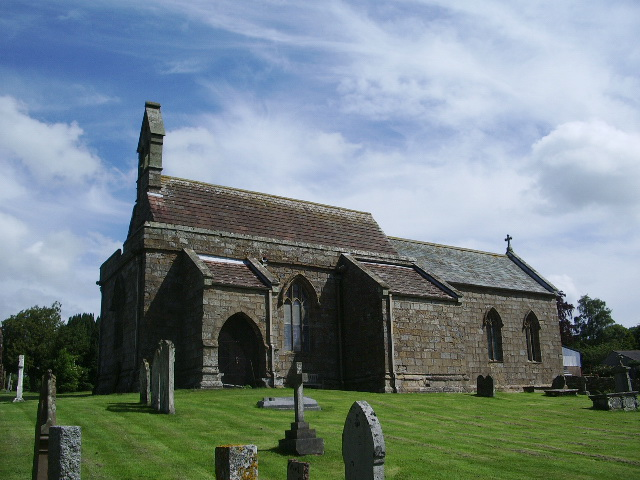
- All Saints' Church from the south

- Location in Cumbria
- OS grid reference: NY 229 407
- Location: Boltongate, Cumbria
- Country: England
- Denomination: Anglican
- Website: All Saints, Boltongate

History
- Status: Parish church

Architecture
- Functional status: Active
- Heritage designation: Grade I
- Designated: 11 April 1967
- Architectural type: Church

Specifications
- Materials: Limestone; nave roof of sandstone slates, chancel roof of green slate

Administration
- Province: York
- Diocese: Carlisle
- Archdeaconry: West Cumberland
- Deanery: Derwent
- Parish: All Saints, Bolton

Clergy
- Vicar: Revd Stephen Walker

All Saints' Church is in the village of Boltongate, Cumbria, England. It is an active Anglican parish church in the deanery of Solway, the archdeaconry of West Cumberland and the diocese of Carlisle. A former fortified church, it is recorded in the National Heritage List for England as a designated Grade I listed building.

== History ==
The church dates mainly from the late 14th century, and it is built on a plinth from an earlier church. The church was built to resist fire and assault. The rectory was also fortified and includes a pele tower.

== Architecture ==
=== Exterior ===
The authors of the Buildings of England series (led by Nikolaus Pevsner) describe the church as "one of the architectural sensations of Cumbria". Externally it is Perpendicular in style, while internally it is more Scottish with French influences. The church is built in limestone; the roof of the nave has sandstone slates, while that of the chancel is in green slate.

Its plan consists of a two-bay nave with north and south porches and chapels forming north and south transepts, and a three-bay chancel with a north vestry. The porches and transepts have a structural function, as they support the thrust of the massive stone roof of the nave. At the west, but set back from the west front, is a twin bellcote. (The bellcote was moved to its present position in 1812). A plain parapet runs round the walls of the nave and a cross finial stands on the east gable. At the northeast junction of the nave and chancel is a hexagonal stair turret that leads to a walkway around the parapet; the turret is surmounted by a slate-covered spire. In the south wall of the chancel is an arched priest's doorway.

=== Interior ===
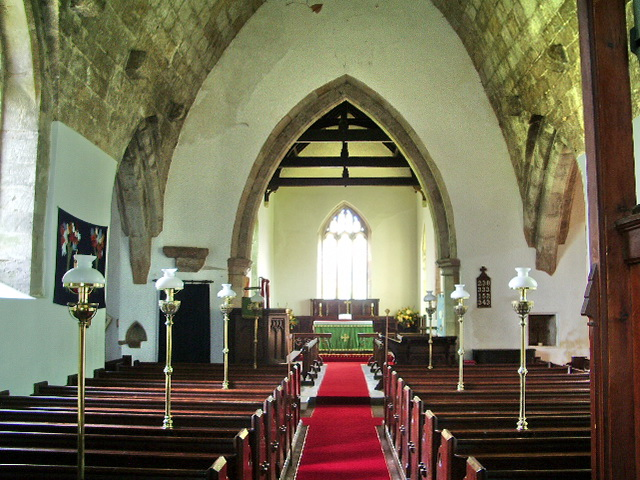
Interior showing the stone-vaulted roof with corbels of uncertain function; they might have supported a wooden loft built as a refuge

The chancel has an open timber roof. The nave has a stone barrel-vaulted roof. This indicates that this was a fortified building, and it is said to be the only stone barrel-vaulted church in England. Corbels at the west end support the bellcote and the parapet walk. The corbels elsewhere in the nave have an uncertain function; they possibly supported the centring over which the vault was built, or an upper floor. As well as a piscina on the south side of the chancel, there are piscinae in both transepts (indicating that they would originally have had altars); the piscina in the south transept has an ogee arch and recesses for aumbries. The font has a 14th-century appearance, but may be older. Around the walls are plaques dating from the 18th and 19th centuries. In the windows is stained glass dated 1864 and 1884 designed by R. B. Edmundson. On the west wall are boards dating from the 19th century that carry the Creed and Lord's Prayer.

=== Organ ===
The church had an undated organ built by the Casson Positive Organ Company. This has been replaced with a 19th-century organ by Wilkinson and Sons of Kendal. The instrument had previously been housed in St Oswald's Church, Grasmere and Lancaster Baptist Church before being moved to Boltongate in 2000.

== See also ==
- Grade I listed churches in Cumbria
- Listed buildings in Boltons
