= St Peter's Church, Kirkbampton =

Coordinates: 54.8980°N 3.0848°W

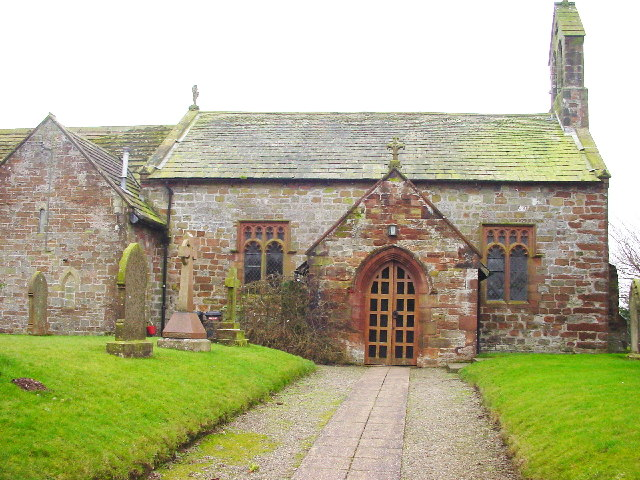
- St Peter's Church, Kirkbampton, from the north

- Location in Cumbria
- OS grid reference: NY 305 564
- Location: Kirkbampton, Cumbria
- Country: England
- Denomination: Anglican
- Website: St Peter, Kirkbampton

History
- Status: Parish church

Architecture
- Functional status: Active
- Heritage designation: Grade I
- Designated: 8 November 1984
- Architectural type: Church
- Style: Norman
- Groundbreaking: 12th century
- Completed: 1882

Specifications
- Materials: Red sandstone and calciferous sandstone, roofs of green slate and sandstone slates

Administration
- Province: York
- Diocese: Carlisle
- Archdeaconry: Carlisle
- Deanery: Carlisle
- Parish: Kirkbampton

St. Peter's Church is in the village of Kirkbampton, Cumbria, England. It is an active Anglican parish church in the deanery of Carlisle, the archdeaconry of Carlisle, and the diocese of Carlisle. Its benefice is united with those of St Andrew, Aikton, St Mary, Kirkandrews-on-Eden with Beaumont, and St Michael, Burgh by Sands. The church contains Norman architecture and is recorded in the National Heritage List for England as a designated Grade I listed building.

== History ==
St Peter's dates from the 12th century. It was restored in 1870–71 and again in 1882.

== Architecture ==
The church is built in red sandstone and calciferous sandstone. The nave has a roof of green slate, while the chancel is roofed with sandstone slates. At the west end is an open double bellcote. The plan of the church consists of a three bay nave with a north porch, and a two-bay chancel with a north organ chamber and vestry. The Norman features are the north doorway, a blocked south doorway, the chancel arch, a lancet window in the south wall of the chancel and the head of a similar lancet that has been reset in the north wall of the organ chamber. The north doorway has a single order and a tympanum including a carved figure. The tympanum of the south doorway is decorated with stone of two different colours in three horizontal bands. The chancel arch has zigzag carving and capitals decorated with scallops.

In the nave are 19th-century two-light windows with tracery, while the east window has three lights. The internal fittings and furnishings date from the 19th century, as do the wooden panelled ceiling in the nave and the barrel vaulted roof in the chancel. During one of the 19th-century restorations, carved and inscribed stones from the nearby Roman Hadrian's Wall were incorporated into the fabric of the south wall. The chancel contains a trefoil-headed piscina with a recess to its right. The stained glass in the east window is by Morris & Co.; it is a triplet dating from 1871, but is badly preserved. It includes a depiction of Christ and eight angels with musical instruments by William Morris, and of Christ with the flag of St George by Edward Burne-Jones. Another window dating from 1885 is by E. R. Suffling of Edgware Road, London. A further window contains glass by William Wailes. The two-manual organ dates from about 1900 and was made by Albert E. Pease of the Phoenix Works, Stoke Newington.

== See also ==
- Grade I listed churches in Cumbria
- Grade I listed buildings in Cumbria
- Listed buildings in Kirkbampton
