= Clawthorpe =

Hamlet in Cumbria, England

Coordinates: 54.191°N 2.719°W

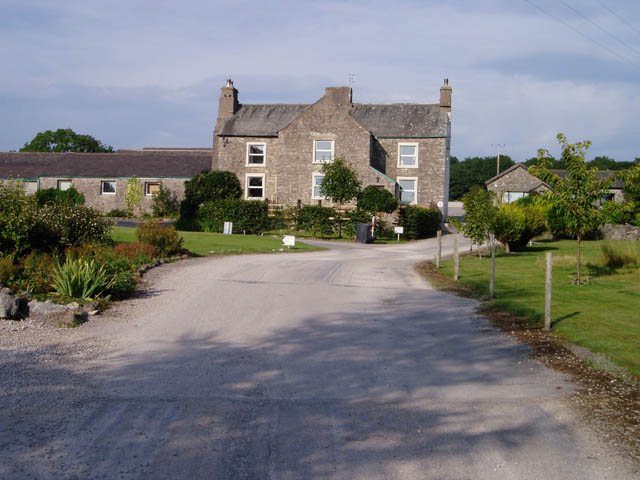
- Clawthorpe Hall Business Centre

- Location in South Lakeland Location within Cumbria
- OS grid reference: SD530775
- Civil parish: Burton-in-Kendal
- Unitary authority: Westmorland and Furness
- Ceremonial county: Cumbria
- Region: North West
- Country: England
- Sovereign state: United Kingdom
- Post town: CARNFORTH
- Postcode district: LA6
- Dialling code: 01524
- Police: Cumbria
- Fire: Cumbria
- Ambulance: North West
- UK Parliament: Westmorland and Lonsdale

Clawthorpe is a hamlet in the civil parish of Burton-in-Kendal, in the Westmorland and Furness district, in the ceremonial county of Cumbria, England. It is near the village of Burton-in-Kendal and the town of Kendal. Clawthorpe is on the A6070 road and nearly on the M6 motorway, but there is no access to Clawthorpe from the motorway. The name "Clawthorpe" means "the thorp of the clerks".
