= Kirkbampton =

Village and civil parish in Cumbria, England

Coordinates: 54.898°N 3.081°W

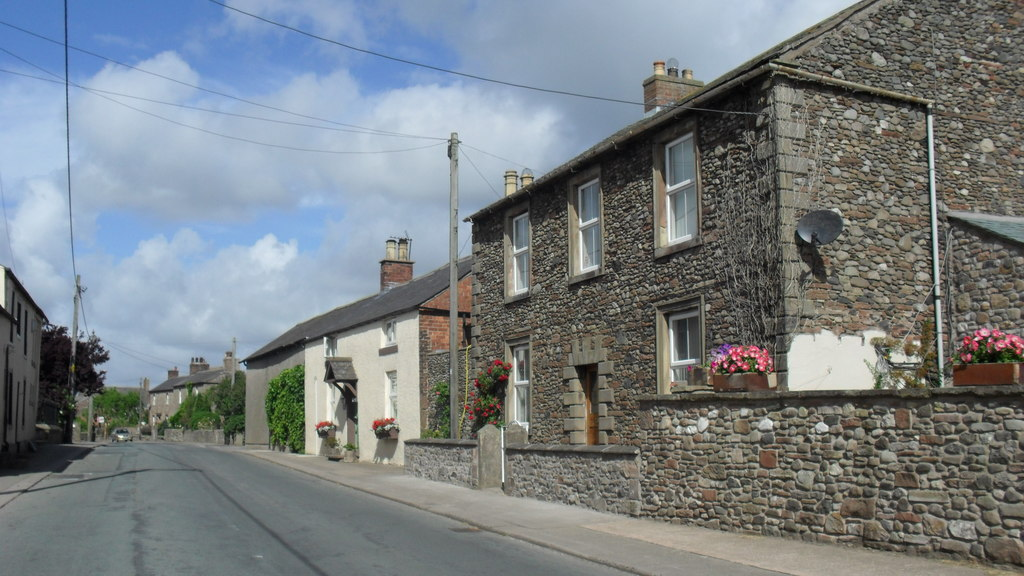
- Kirkbampton

- Location in Allerdale, Cumbria Location within Cumbria
- Population: 482 (2011)
- OS grid reference: NY306564
- Civil parish: Kirkbampton
- Unitary authority: Cumberland
- Ceremonial county: Cumbria
- Region: North West
- Country: England
- Sovereign state: United Kingdom
- Post town: CARLISLE
- Postcode district: CA5
- Dialling code: 01228
- Police: Cumbria
- Fire: Cumbria
- Ambulance: North West
- UK Parliament: Penrith and Solway

Kirkbampton is a village and civil parish on the B5307 road in the English county of Cumbria. The parish population taken at the 2011 census was 482. It is near the city of Carlisle. It has a church called St Peter's Church, and a primary school (St. Peters CofE School). The parish includes the villages/hamlets of Kirkbampton, Little Bampton, Oughterby and Studholme.

The parish Church of Kirkbampton is dedicated to St Peter, and is an ancient Norman structure and a Grade I listed building, of typical Cumbrian character. The chancel arch and North doorway, both being original and in situ, are Saxon in style and fix the dimensions of the early Church. Over the North entrance door is a sculptured tympanum. Only five examples of these tympana exist is Cumbria, and the one at Kirkbampton, with its surrounding arch, is probably the most perfect, despite suffering from the weather. It is not now easy to decipher, but appears to be a figure and animals. A Roman stone found in the walls during restoration work in 1870-1871 is now built into the South wall of the chancel. It bears the inscription "VEX,LEG P.F. FEC.", and has probably been brought from the nearby Hadrian's Wall.

== Kirkbampton Village Hall ==
The first village hall in Kirkbampton came about just after the First World War in 1920, when it was decided that a regular meeting place was required in the village. This was Laurel Cottage, and each day a fire was lit, and papers were delivered to the cottage. However, in 1930, it was decided that Laurel Cottage no longer met the needs of the village, and funds were raised to purchase an ex-army building, where the village hall routine continued. The use of this hall was continued throughout the 20th century, until in 1990, when a surveyor concluded that the village hall was dangerous and inadequate for its use.

It was decided by a committee in the summer of 1996 that a new hall was to be built in Kirkbampton, significantly larger than the previous structure, and with increased parking space. This project was named 'Project 2000'. After many more meetings, and the circulation of a questionnaire, the new hall was to be built in the near future. Cumbria Building and Design were chosen for the project, and the land adjacent to the school was purchased from Mr J Graham. A national lottery grant was gratefully received, and work commenced. The development started on Monday 19 February and was completed on 4 October 2001. The hall is still in regular use in 2025 and can be hired for private functions.

== See also ==
- Listed buildings in Kirkbampton
