= Boltongate =

Village in Cumbria, England

Coordinates: 54.756°N 03.20°W

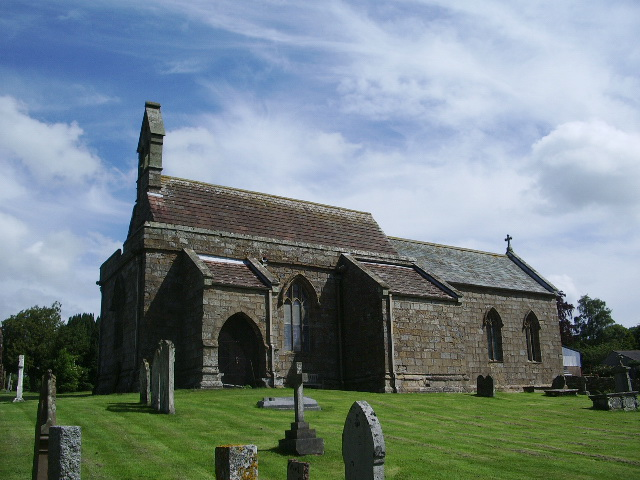
- All Saints' Church, Boltongate

- Location in Allerdale, Cumbria Location within Cumbria
- OS grid reference: NY2240
- Civil parish: Boltons
- Unitary authority: Cumberland
- Ceremonial county: Cumbria
- Region: North West
- Country: England
- Sovereign state: United Kingdom
- Post town: WIGTON
- Postcode district: CA7
- Dialling code: 01697
- Police: Cumbria
- Fire: Cumbria
- Ambulance: North West
- UK Parliament: Penrith and Solway

Boltongate is a village in Cumbria, England. It is situated about 10 miles (16 km) north-east of Cockermouth. It is located just outside the Lake District National Park.

All Saints' Church has a stone tunnel-vaulted roof said to be the only one of its kind in England. It is a fortified church thought to have been strengthened to resist Scottish reivers or raiders. The nearby rectory incorporates a 15th-century pele tower.

== Governance ==
Boltongate is part of the Penrith and Solway constituency of the UK Parliament.

For Local Government purposes it is in the Cumberland unitary authority area.

The village has its own Parish Council, the Boltons Parish Council.

== See also ==
- Listed buildings in Boltons
