= Dalton, Cumbria =

Coordinates: 54.183°N 2.701°W

Dalton
- Hamlet
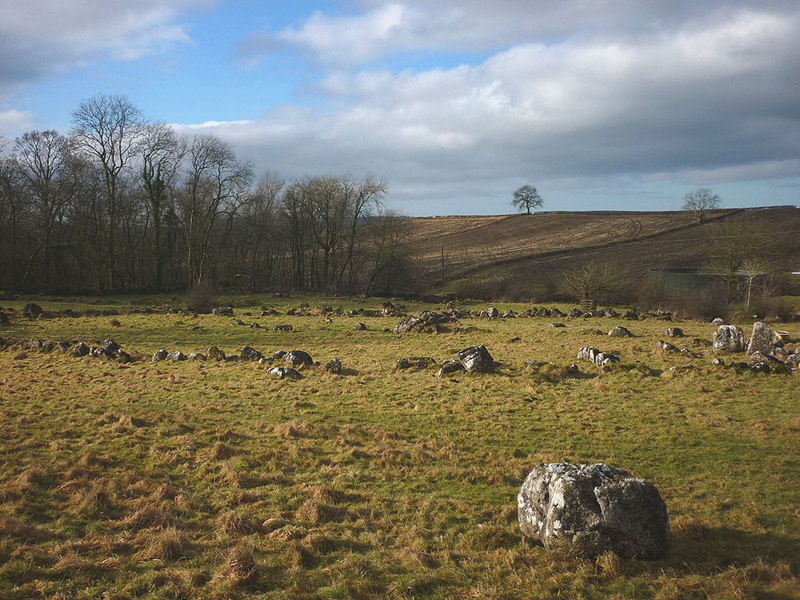
- Russell Farm Enclosure, Dalton

- Location in South Lakeland Location within Cumbria
- OS grid reference: SD542766
- Civil parish: Burton-in-Kendal
- Unitary authority: Westmorland and Furness
- Ceremonial county: Cumbria
- Region: North West
- Country: England
- Sovereign state: United Kingdom
- Post town: CARNFORTH
- Postcode district: LA6
- Dialling code: 01524
- Police: Cumbria
- Fire: Cumbria
- Ambulance: North West
- UK Parliament: Westmorland and Lonsdale

Dalton is a hamlet and former civil parish, now in the parish of Burton-in-Kendal, in the Westmorland and Furness district, Cumbria, England. Until 1894 it was in Lancashire, but was transferred to Westmorland "in accordance with the unanimous desire of the inhabitants". In 1961 the parish had a population of 99. Dalton was formerly a township in Burton-in-Kendal parish, from 1866 Dalton was a civil parish in its own right until it was abolished on 1 April 1986 and merged with Burton to form "Burton-in-Kendal".

Dalton is located about a mile east of Burton-in-Kendal and gives its name to Dalton Crags and Dalton Hall.

Remains of medieval settlements in the area have been recorded by archaeologists, and "Dalton medieval village and parts of its associated medieval open field system centred 620m ENE of Dalton Hall" is listed as a scheduled monument.

Dalton Old Hall farmhouse is a grade II listed building.
