= Holme, Cumbria =

Village and civil parish in Cumbria, England

Coordinates: 54.204°N 2.731°W

Holme
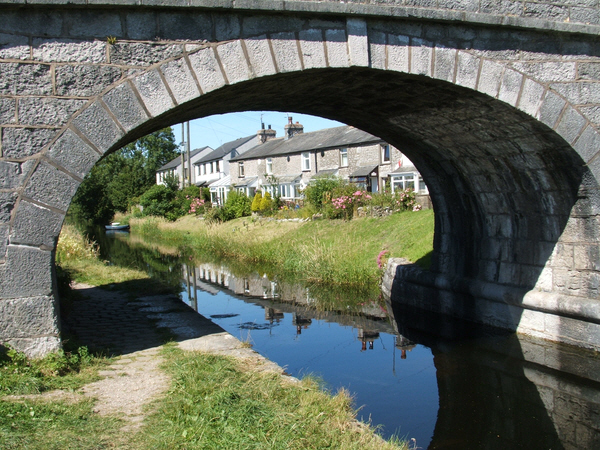
- Lancaster Canal

- Location within Cumbria
- Population: 1,486 (2011)
- OS grid reference: SD5279
- Civil parish: Holme
- Unitary authority: Westmorland and Furness
- Ceremonial county: Cumbria
- Region: North West
- Country: England
- Sovereign state: United Kingdom
- Post town: CARNFORTH
- Postcode district: LA6
- Dialling code: 01524
- Police: Cumbria
- Fire: Cumbria
- Ambulance: North West
- UK Parliament: Westmorland and Lonsdale

Holme is a village and civil parish in the Westmorland and Furness district of Cumbria, England, about 2 miles (3.2 km) north of Burton-in-Kendal and 3 miles (4.8 km) south east of Milnthorpe. The parish had a population of 1,167 at the 2001 census, increasing to 1,486 at the 2011 Census.

== History ==
Holme was originally a minor settlement in the parish of Burton-in-Kendal. It expanded following the completion of the Lancaster Canal in 1819, which provided a transport link for the mill at Holme Mills. The parish church of the Holy Trinity was built in 1839 to support the growing population, and the former school, now the parish hall, opened in 1840. The school was replaced in 1911 by a larger building on North Road, which still survives as Holme Primary School.

== Geography ==
Historically within the county of Westmorland, the village lies adjacent to the Lancaster Canal, West Coast Main Line and M6 motorway, which run close together to take advantage of the local topography.

== Governance ==
An electoral ward in the same name exists. This ward stretches beyond the confines of Holme parish with at total population at the 2011 Census of 1,728.

== Community ==
Amenities include a public house called "The Smithy Inn", a village hall, a playing field, a cricket pitch, and Holy Trinity Church. There is an hourly bus service to the nearby towns of Carnforth and Lancaster, to the south; and Kendal, to the north, operated by Stagecoach North West. The Lancaster Canal runs through the village.

Holme Park Quarry is a small quarry to the east of the village; also on site is a premix concrete plant.

The neighbourhood of Holme Mills, on the southern edge of the village, is centred on the 19th century jute mill of the same name. Its amenities include the Holme Social Club which serves both Holme Mills and Holme. The mill buildings are now part of Holme Mills Industrial Estate, which houses a number of small businesses.

== See also ==
- Listed buildings in Holme, Cumbria

== Gallery ==
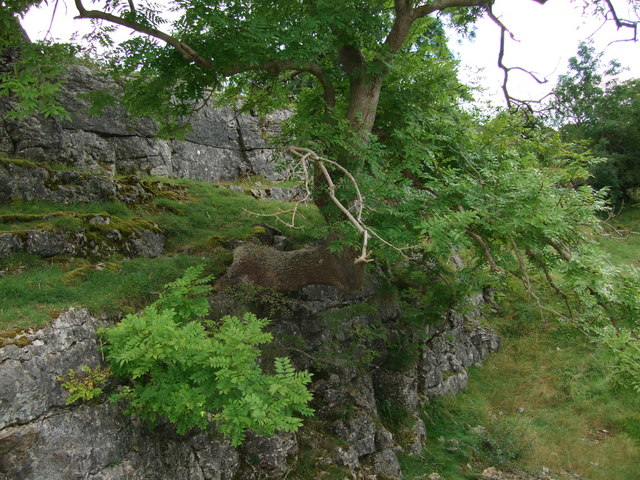
Holmepark Fell

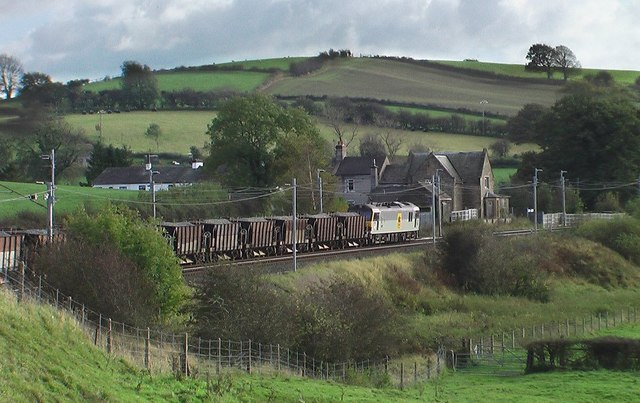
Rail line near Holme
