= Oughterby =

Hamlet in Cumbria, England

Coordinates: 54.891°N 3.102°W

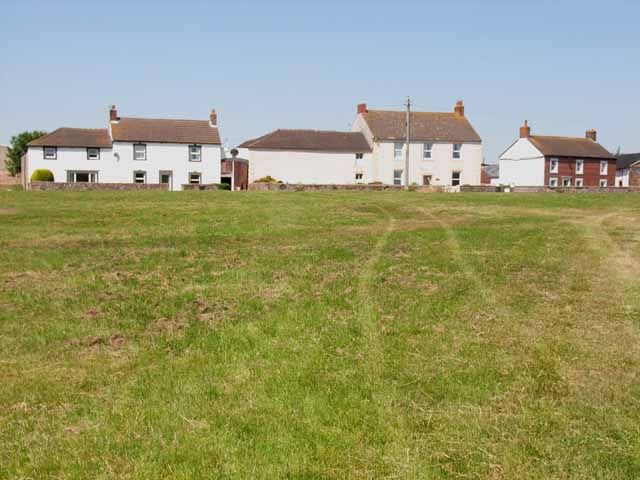
- Oughterby

- Location within Cumbria
- OS grid reference: NY293557
- Civil parish: Kirkbampton
- Unitary authority: Cumberland
- Ceremonial county: Cumbria
- Region: North West
- Country: England
- Sovereign state: United Kingdom
- Post town: CARLISLE
- Postcode district: CA5
- Dialling code: 016973
- Police: Cumbria
- Fire: Cumbria
- Ambulance: North West
- UK Parliament: Penrith and Solway

Oughterby is a hamlet in the English county of Cumbria. It is near the city of Carlisle and the village of Kirkbampton. For transport there is the B5307 road nearby.

It may be the place referred to in 1430 as "Ughtryghtby", the home of Thomas Jakson, yeoman, supposedly owing money to Robert Heghmour.
