= Burton-in-Kendal =

Village and civil parish in Cumbria, England

Coordinates: 54.182927°N 2.720739°W

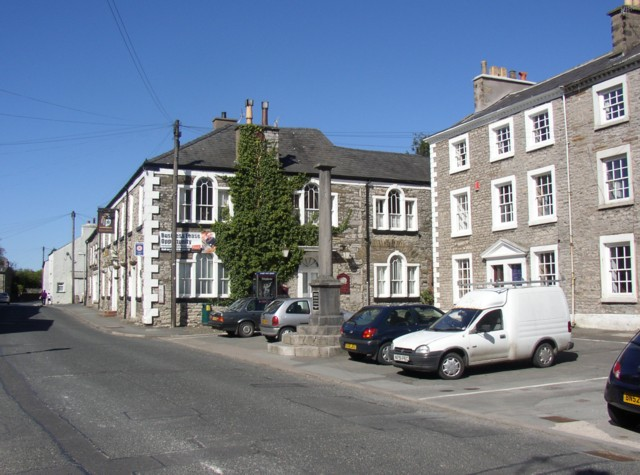
- Market Cross

- Location in the former South Lakeland district Location within Cumbria
- Population: 1,497 (2011)
- OS grid reference: SD5376
- Civil parish: Burton-in-Kendal
- Unitary authority: Westmorland and Furness
- Ceremonial county: Cumbria
- Region: North West
- Country: England
- Sovereign state: United Kingdom
- Post town: CARNFORTH
- Postcode district: LA6
- Dialling code: 01524
- Police: Cumbria
- Fire: Cumbria
- Ambulance: North West
- UK Parliament: Morecambe and Lunesdale

Burton-in-Kendal is a village and civil parish on the extreme southern edge of Cumbria, England. The parish contains around 660 houses and in the 2001 census had a population of 1,411, increasing at the 2011 census to 1,497. Historically within the county of Westmorland (with parts of the surrounding area within Lancashire), the village straddles the A6070 road between Crooklands and Carnforth, at a point around midway between Lancaster and Kendal, and is in the shadow of the nearby limestone outcrop known as Farleton Knott.

== History ==
The ancient village church is dedicated to St James. In the 18th century Burton was home to an important corn market. The composer Felix Borowski was born in the village in March, 1872. The Manor of Burton is held by the Atkinson family and whilst land and property holdings were disposed of, the title of Lord of the manor was retained. Due to its position, the history of Burton in Kendal lies in transport, as travellers used its many inns to eat, drink, and rest their pack horses before entering or leaving the county. There are also a multi-use games area (MUGA), tennis courts and a bowling green which are operated by various sports groups within the village.

The village has a rich local history. Kath Hayhurst has produced a book of photographs and annotations entitled "Burton-in-Kendal, Clawthorpe and Dalton – Photographic Memories". Copies are available from the village shop or from the Holme and District Local History Society.

== Community ==
A group of villagers produce a regular monthly newsletter called the Burton News which is distributed free to every household in the parish. Burton News came first in its category of monthly magazine in a contest organised by the Diocese of Carlisle in 2002.

The village is situated ideally for access to the Lake District; the west coast; and to the east, the Yorkshire Dales; and Howgill Fells.

Burton in Kendal's local football club, Burton Thistle F.C., currently play in the North Lancashire and District Football League in the nearby hamlet of Clawthorpe.

== Governance ==
The parish is in the electoral ward of Burton and Holme. This stretches to both villages and their surrounding areas. The total population of the ward at the 2011 Census was 3,789.

The parish of "Burton-in-Kendal" was formed on 1 April 1986 from the parishes of "Burton" and "Dalton".

== Notable people ==
The novelist and poet Anne Spillard who lives in the village won the Yorkshire Post Book Award for Best First Work for her novel The Cartomancer in 1987.

The novelist Joe Stretch grew up in the village during the 1990s.

== Gallery ==
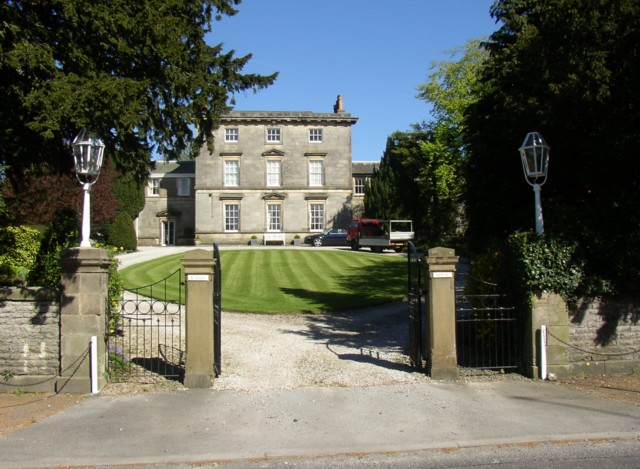
Burton House

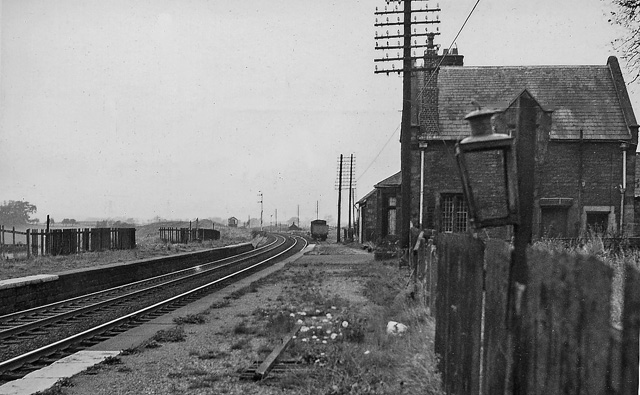
Remains of Burton and Holme railway station on the West Coast Main Line

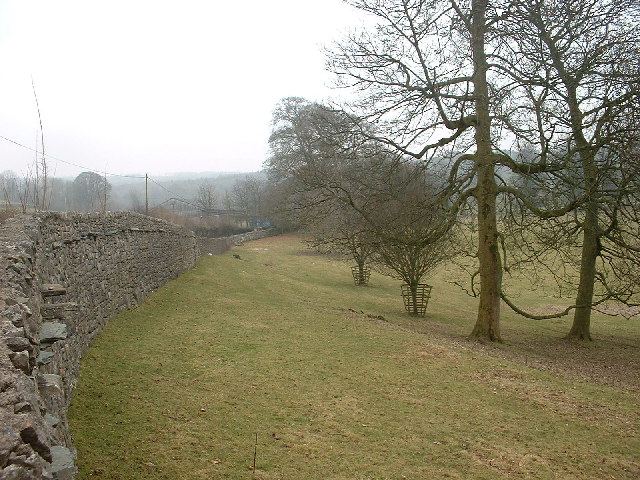
Dalton Park

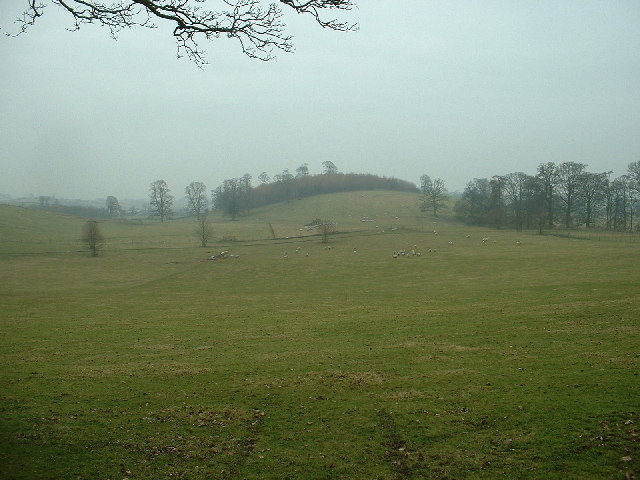
Dalton Park fields

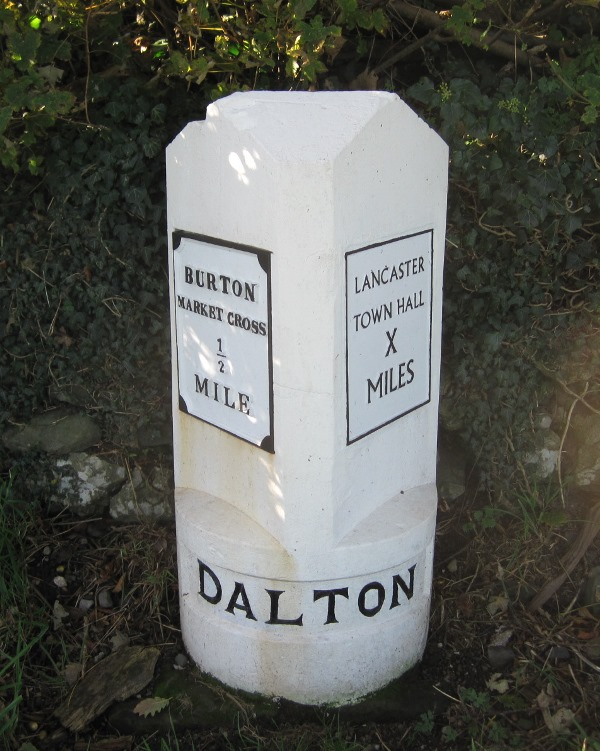
Milestone near Heron Syke

== See also ==
- Listed buildings in Burton-in-Kendal
