= Little Bampton =

Village in Cumbria, England

Coordinates: 54.89°N 03.14°W

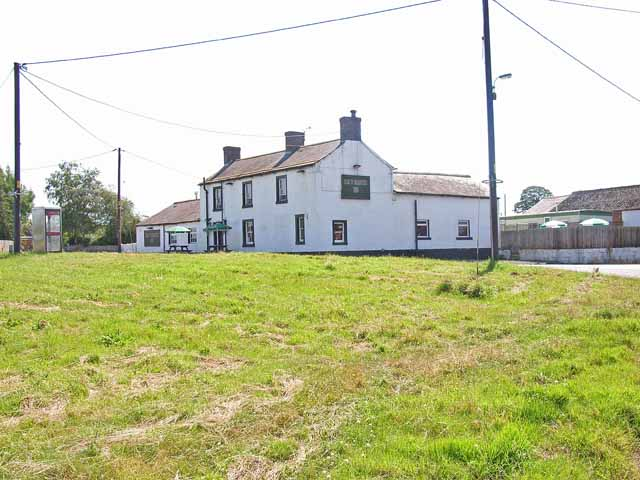
- The Tam o'Shanter public house, Little Bampton

- Location in Allerdale, Cumbria Location within Cumbria
- OS grid reference: NY271552
- Civil parish: Kirkbampton
- Unitary authority: Cumberland
- Ceremonial county: Cumbria
- Region: North West
- Country: England
- Sovereign state: United Kingdom
- Post town: WIGTON
- Postcode district: CA7
- Dialling code: 016973
- Police: Cumbria
- Fire: Cumbria
- Ambulance: North West
- UK Parliament: Penrith and Solway

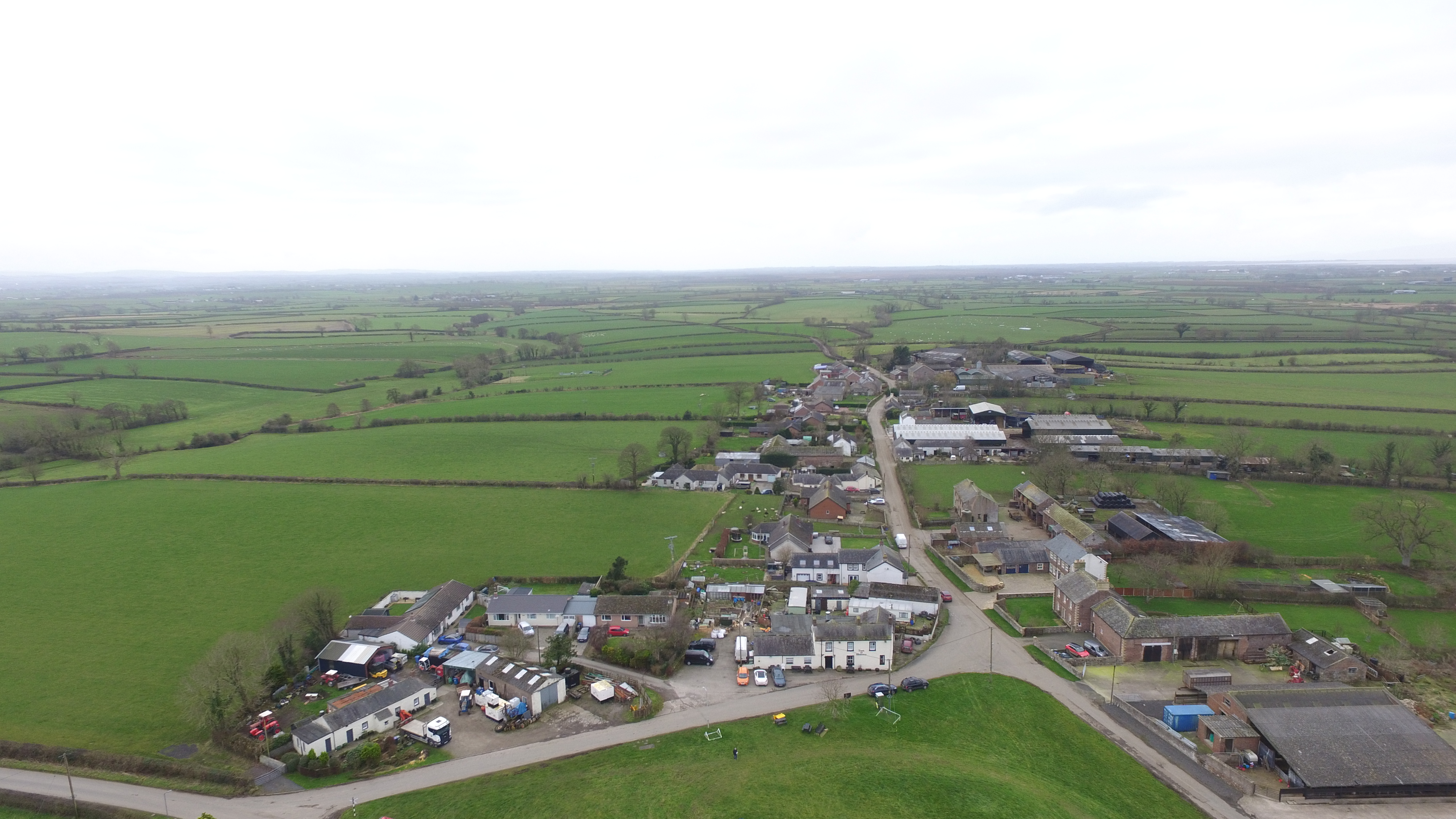
Aerial view of the village

Little Bampton is a village in Cumbria situated 6 miles outside the market town of Wigton and 8 miles west of Carlisle, England. The village comprises approximately 40 houses, some dating back to the 18th century. The village does not have a hall or a Church, but its meeting place is the Pub called 'The Tam O'Shanter'. In 1870-72 the township had a population of 172.
