= St Cuthbert's Church, Dufton =

Coordinates: 54.6299°N 2.4897°W

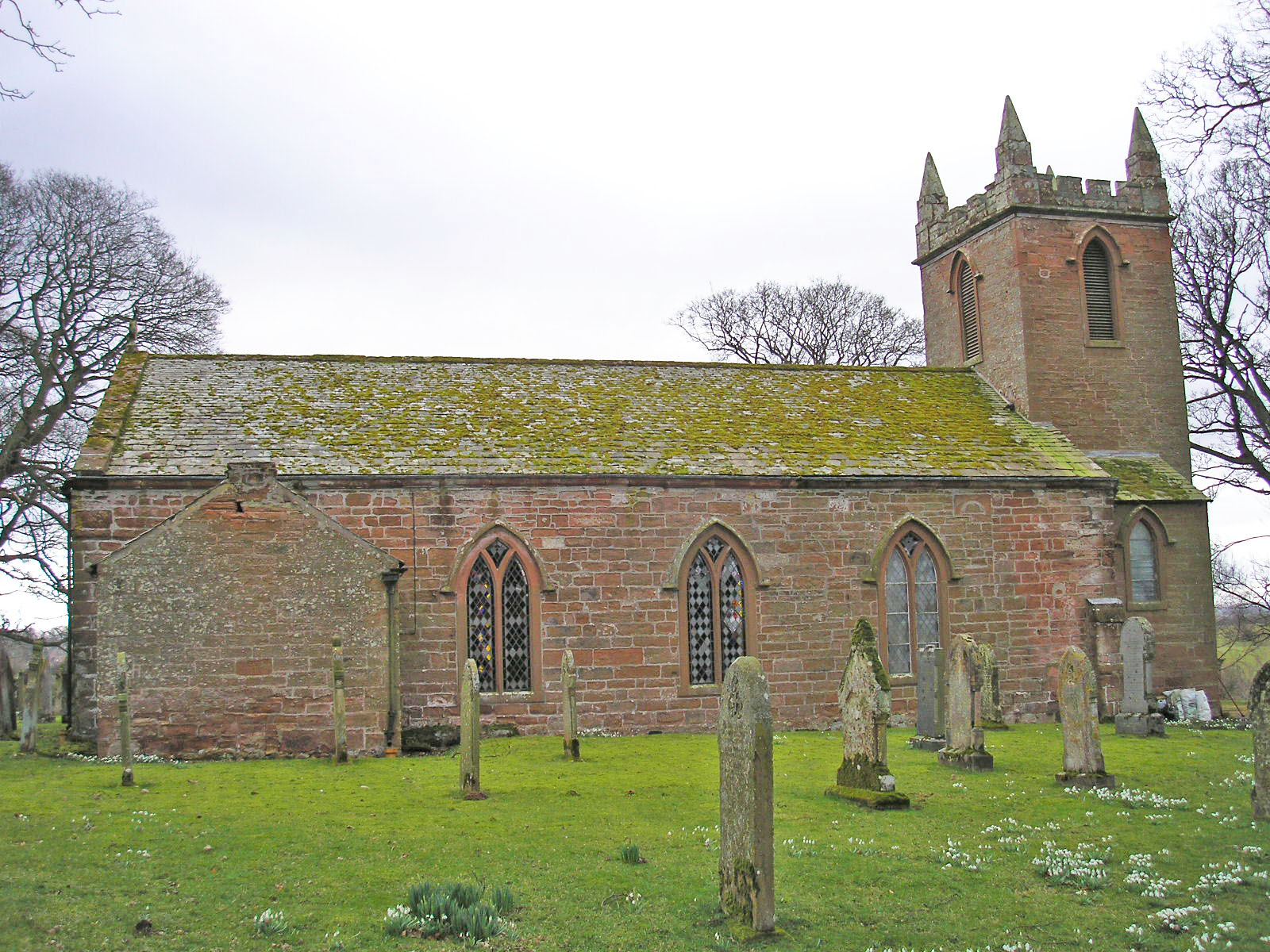
- St Cuthbert's Church, Dufton

- Location in Cumbria
- OS grid reference: NY 68486 26201
- Location: Dufton, Cumbria
- Country: England
- Denomination: Anglican

History
- Status: Parish church

Architecture
- Functional status: Active
- Architectural type: Church

Administration
- Province: York
- Diocese: Carlisle
- Archdeaconry: Carlisle
- Deanery: Appleby-in-Westmorland
- Parish: Dufton

Clergy
- Rector: Revd Andrew Burrell

St Cuthbert's Church is situated 3/4 mile (1.2 km) north of the village of Dufton, Cumbria, England. It should not be confused with the nearby St Cuthbert's church, Milburn. It is an active Anglican parish church in the deanery of Appleby, the archdeaconry of Carlisle, and the diocese of Carlisle. The parish is one of ten parishes (Note: The "Heart of Eden Parishes": Long Marton, Dufton, Milburn, Appleby-in-Westmorland, Murton, Great Ormside, Great Asby, Temple Sowerby, Kirkby Thore, Newbiggin, Warcop, and Great Musgrave) which form the benefice of the Heart of Eden.

The Parish Church of St Cuthbert, Dufton, is situated north-west of the village of Dufton – the name of which means 'dove farm' – and nestles beneath the eastern fells above the Eden Valley, about 3 miles (4.8 km) north of Appleby and 12 miles (19 km) south-east of Penrith. From the new churchyard, fine views are to be had of Dufton Pike and the Pennines.

== History and toponymy ==
The old churchyard is curvilinear, possibly indicating a Celtic foundation. 'Old Dufton', the site of a settlement on the fell above Dufton, has been identified as Romano-British. The first mention of 'the manor of Dufton' occurs in the Pipe Rolls of 1176 and of the church itself in Papal Taxation Records of 1291.

Tradition has it that the original church was built on one of the sites where monks from Lindisfarne rested themselves and the body of St Cuthbert during their flight from the Vikings in 865/6.Church records indicate a rector's presence in 1293, while the dedication to St Cuthbert is referred to in 1366. However, the ornamental stones used in the rebuilding of the church, the two re-used round window-heads and the two voussoirs with chevron-ornament, reset in the north and south walls respectively, point to the existence of twelfth-century building. There is also evidence of earlier stonework : outside, in the south wall of the chancel, there is a small figure carved into a small stone panel which is thought to be of Roman origin, and set into the east wall of the nave is an ornamented medieval grave slab.

The walls of the present building are of sandstone rubble and ashlar with dressings of the same material; the roofs are slate-covered. The interior is light and airy, with no chancel arch and a high canted ceiling with stucco panelling, spanning both nave and chancel. At the west end is a wooden-panelled gallery and underneath it a slim font.

Restorations took place in 1673, 1784 and 1853. The 1784 restoration, undertaken by the rector and people, appears to have included the building of the west tower, the re-building of the north wall, and perhaps the upper parts of other walls. The 1853 restoration seems to have determined to a great extent the present character of the building. In 1946, the roof and east end were rebuilt, and the old glass re-used in the new east window. In 1983, some south-side windows were re-leaded.

The brightness and airiness of the interior derive from the nature of the windows which are a feature of this church. They share a pattern of clear glass and brightly coloured, lozenge-shaped panes. They are said to have been made by Faucet of Appleby c.1784. In the centre of the east window is a dove, representing the Holy Spirit, descending in flames – and a reminder that Dufton means 'dove farm'.

Three plaques describe various endowments for the poor and uneducated of Dufton and Knock. One of these on the north wall of the nave, includes an endowment in 1835 "to ten poor widows or householders of the parish of Dufton also to five poor widows or householders of the township of Knock, to each six and a half stone loaves of the finest wheaten bread" for distribution every Christmas Day.

== Dufton's Famous Son ==
Among the Forty Martyrs of England and Wales canonised by Pope Paul VI in 1970 was John Boste (Boast) who is honoured with a plaque in the porch. The Boste family belonged to Penrith and Dufton, and parish records show that they were christened, married and buried in both places.

John was born in Dufton in 1543. He reputedly attended Appleby Grammar School where he became a master after leaving Queen's College, Oxford. At Oxford, John was elected a Fellow, which means he had taken holy orders in the Protestant Church of England. We know, however, that he later became a Roman Catholic, trained for the priesthood in France and, following ordination, returned to England to minister in secret to the Catholics of his native land, particularly those in the north.

He became a wanted man and was eventually betrayed, arrested and taken to the Tower of London. For entering the country illegally as a Catholic priest and for celebrating Mass he was charged with treason and tried at Durham, where he was sentenced to be hanged, drawn and quartered on 24 July 1594. He died faithfully.

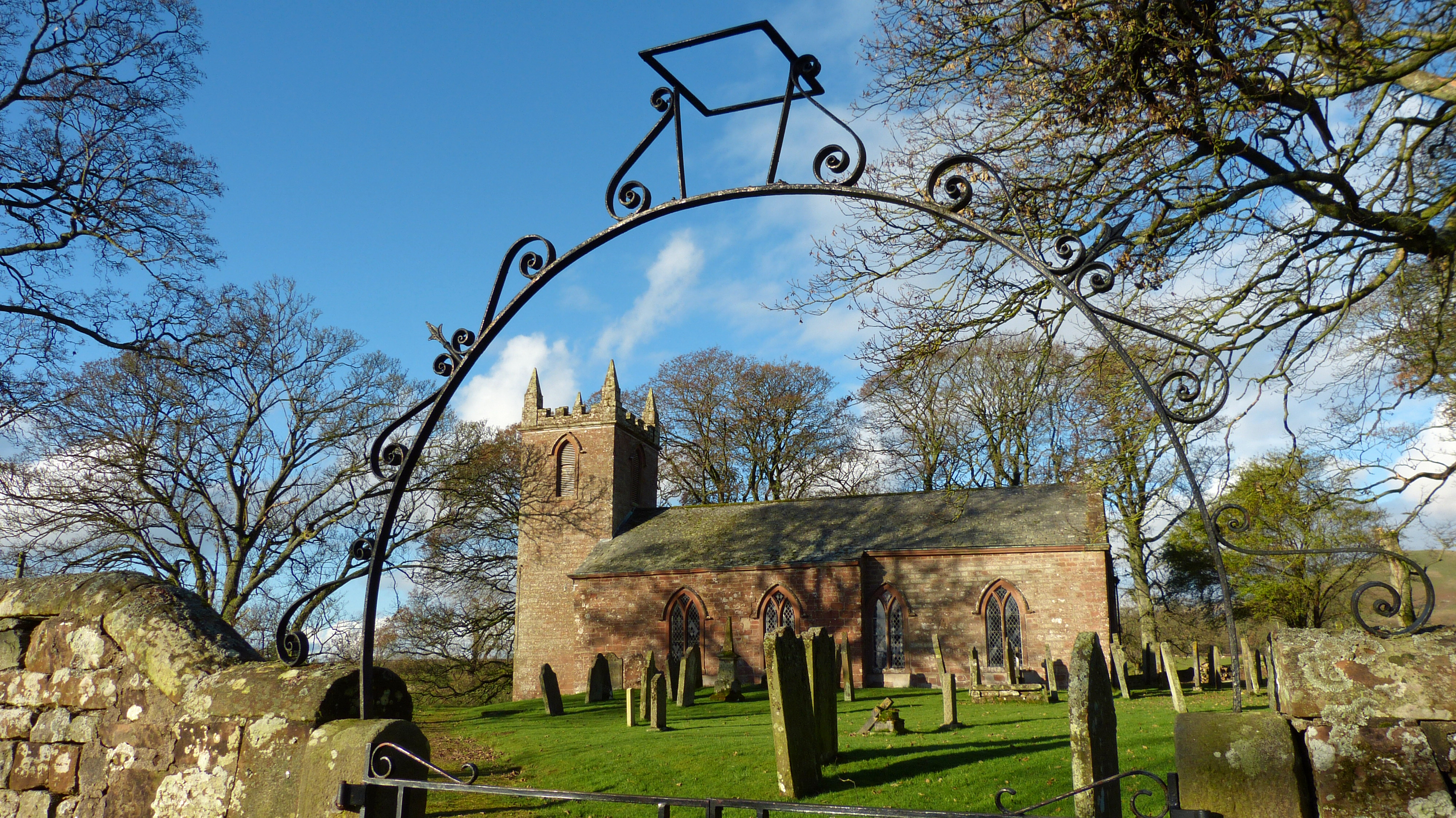
St. Cuthbert's, Dufton

The church originates from the medieval period, but was rebuilt in 1784 and restored in 1853 and again in 1946. It is Grade II listed.

== Architecture ==
St Cuthbert's Church is built in the gothic style.

== See also ==
- Listed buildings in Dufton
