= Flakebridge =

Hamlet in Cumbria, England

Coordinates: 54.592°N 2.460°W

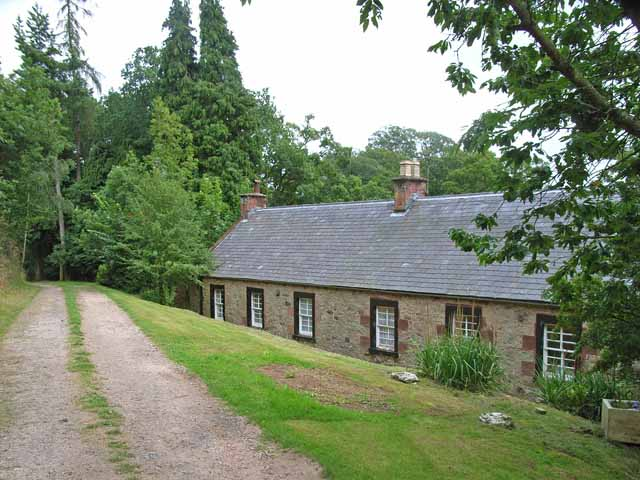
- Cottages and houses at Flakebridge

- Location in Eden, Cumbria Location within Cumbria
- OS grid reference: NY702219
- Civil parish: Murton
- Unitary authority: Westmorland and Furness
- Ceremonial county: Cumbria
- Region: North West
- Country: England
- Sovereign state: United Kingdom
- Post town: APPLEBY-IN-WESTMORLAND
- Postcode district: CA16
- Dialling code: 017683
- Police: Cumbria
- Fire: Cumbria
- Ambulance: North West
- UK Parliament: Westmorland and Lonsdale

Flakebridge is a woodland and small hamlet in the Westmorland and Furness district, Cumbria, England, 3 kilometres (1.9 mi) south-west from the village of Dufton and 1.95 kilometres (1.21 mi) east from the town of Appleby-in-Westmorland.

== Location and geography ==
The hamlet is situated in Flakebridge Wood, which has several footpaths. The Wood itself covers 2.03 square kilometres (500 acres) and from north to south measures 3.13 kilometres (1.94 mi). The Forest is composed mainly of medium to large coniferous trees, small pines and large deciduous trees such as oak, beech and some ash. A number of streams such as Keisley beck run through the Forest. The hamlet is located on the western edge of the Forest, consisting of three to four buildings and houses.

== History ==
In the past, the Wood has been much smaller than it is today. In Thomas Jeffrey's 1770 map of Westmorland, Flakebridge Wood appears to be only a third of its current size. There is no empirical survey evidence of Flakebridge Wood existing before this point, however possible woodland is featured on Christopher Saxton’s 1579 map of Westmorland and Cumberland in the modern Flakebridge area. The Hamlet is not marked or cannot be found in any historic maps, as a result, the Hamlet's date of founding or history remains unknown.

== Tourism ==
There are several footpaths in Flakebridge Wood making it a popular walking destination. Flakebridge is also popular for hunting, particularly Pheasants. High Cup Nick and the Pennine Way can also be found nearby.
