= Keisley =

Hamlet in Cumbria, England

Coordinates: 54.607°N 2.451°W

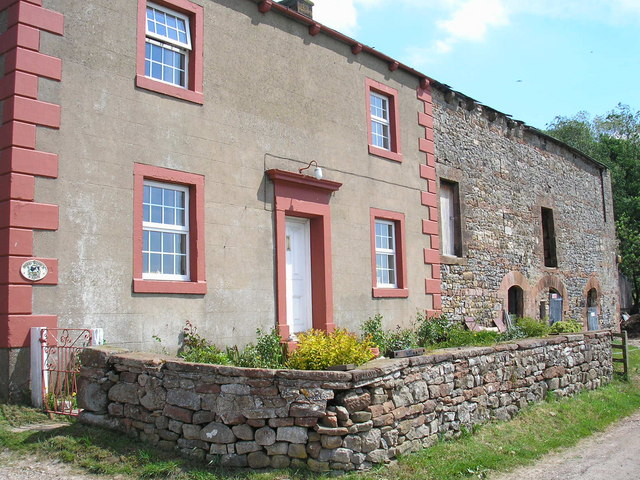
- Mid Town Farm

- Location in Eden, Cumbria Location within Cumbria
- Population: 7
- OS grid reference: NY708236
- Civil parish: Dufton
- Unitary authority: Westmorland and Furness
- Ceremonial county: Cumbria
- Region: North West
- Country: England
- Sovereign state: United Kingdom
- Post town: APPLEBY-IN-WESTMORLAND
- Postcode district: CA16
- Dialling code: 017683
- Police: Cumbria
- Fire: Cumbria
- Ambulance: North West
- UK Parliament: Westmorland and Lonsdale

Keisley is a small hamlet in the English county of Cumbria. It is located in the Dufton civil parish and the Westmorland and Furness district.

== Location and geography ==
Keisley is located approximately 1 mile (1.6 km) south east of the village of Dufton and 2 miles (3.2 km) north west of Murton, and 3 miles (4.8 km) east from the town of Appleby-in-Westmorland. Keisley is situated at the foot of Keisley Bank, a small hill with a height of 1,200 feet (370 m) above sea level which is part of the Pennines. The hamlet consists of seven homes: Town Head Farm, a former winery (the only in Cumbria); Mid Town Farm, an old Edwardian house and farm; Keisley House, a large Edwardian residence with a small woodland to the south; Keisley Farm, one of the oldest buildings in the hamlet; A former public house known as the Royal Inn, now converted to a house; Rum-bush cottage, a holiday let; and a small house known as Tidy Bank situated on the south side of the hamlet.

The various houses and farms are situated along the No68 road which connects the villages of Dufton and Murton. To the west of the hamlet, towards Appleby lies Flakebridge Wood (1 mile (1.6 km) away from Mid Town Farm). Scalehowe wood is another smaller wood located roughly 500 meters south west of Keisley Farm. Keisley Beck/High Cup gill Beck is a stream that runs nearby the hamlet, originating at High Cup Nick and flowing into Flakebridge Wood.

== History ==
Keisley was part of the county of Westmorland until 1974 when it was merged with Cumberland to form Cumbria. Keisley is mentioned in Thomas Jefferys’s 1770 map of Westmorland as “Keisley” or “Keifley”. The map features a cluster of buildings in the same area that Keisley Farm is located today. Cary's 1794 map of England, Scotland and Wales clearly displays a hamlet labelled as ‘Keisley’. In ‘A new map of the counties of Cumberland and Westmorland from 1760, Keisley is not mentioned instead a place named “Morton Hall” stands in the same location as the modern hamlet, however it is likely that Morton Hall refers to the modern Murton Hall (a grade II listed 14th-century building) located at the nearby village of Murton, there is no archeological evidence of any site by that name existing at Keisley. There are no other records of Keisley from any other map or survey prior to this period apart from a possible settlement being featured in Christopher Saxton’s 1579 map of Westmorland however the settlement is unmarked and not named. It can be inferred that a settlement by the name of Keisley could have been founded anywhere between the 1500s and 1760s.

=== Castle Hill ===
There are physical remains of a small Iron Age settlement with defensive works known as Castle Hill over 1 km west of Keisley. The settlement is a circular enclosure and includes the remains of several small huts and a large building within its interior. It is surrounded by a small stone wall and ditch, it likely housed a family or small community. Castle Hill is a scheduled monument due to the fact it is well preserve.

== Tourism ==
Keisley is located nearby Dufton, a village situated along the Pennine Way and Cumbrian Cycleway. High Cup Nick can also be found nearby and the High Cup Nick footpath runs through Keisley near Midtown Farm.

== Transport ==
Appleby railway station (Cumbria) (on the Settle-Carlisle Line) runs Northern Rail services to Leeds and Carlisle. The A66 road also runs through Appleby nearby and Keisley itself is situated along the No86 road running from Dufton to Murton.
