= Brackenber =

Hamlet in Cumbria, England

Coordinates: 54.56°N 02.43°W

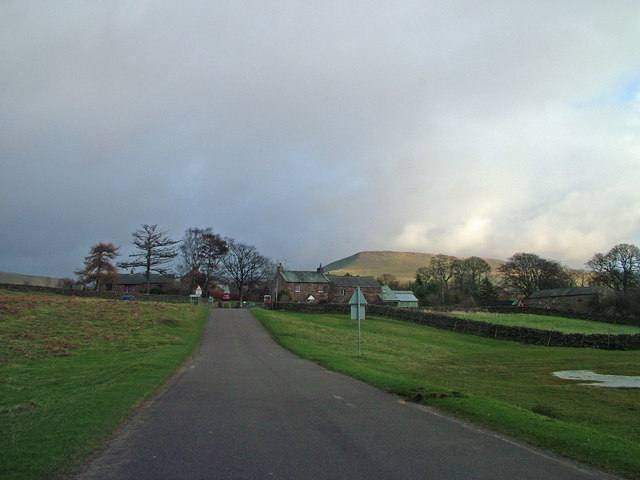
- Brackenber

- Location in Eden, Cumbria Location within Cumbria
- OS grid reference: NY7219
- Civil parish: Murton
- Unitary authority: Westmorland and Furness
- Ceremonial county: Cumbria
- Region: North West
- Country: England
- Sovereign state: United Kingdom
- Post town: APPLEBY-IN-WESTMORLAND
- Postcode district: CA16
- Dialling code: 01768
- Police: Cumbria
- Fire: Cumbria
- Ambulance: North West
- UK Parliament: Westmorland and Lonsdale

Brackenber is a hamlet in the civil parish of Murton in Cumbria, England. It is near the town of Appleby-in-Westmorland and the village of Hilton, Cumbria.

== See also ==
- Listed buildings in Murton, Cumbria
