= Christopher Bainbridge =

Archbishop of York from 1508 to 1514

His Eminence Christopher Bainbridge D.Cn., CL
- Cardinal, Archbishop of York; Primate of England
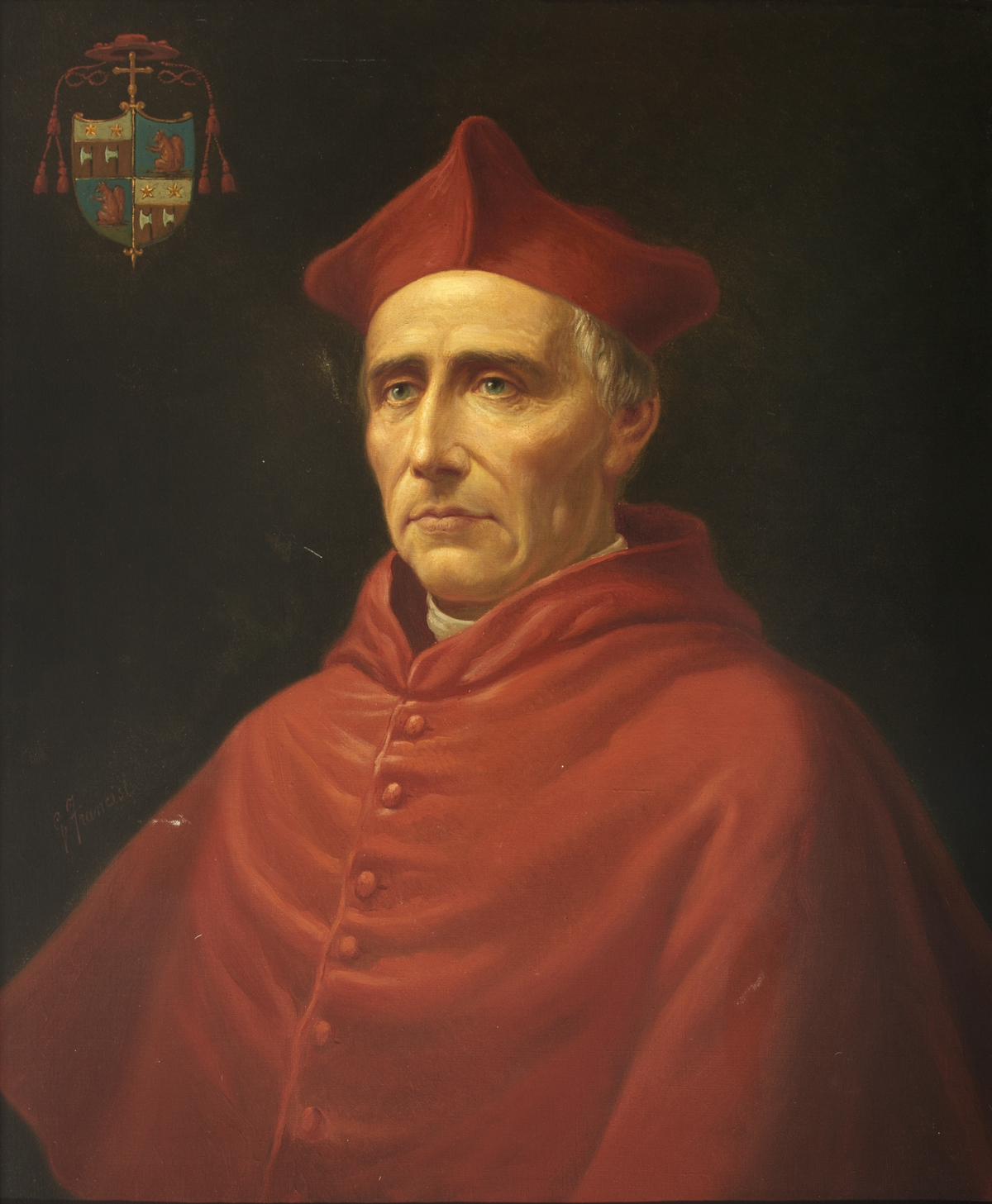
- Province: York
- Diocese: York
- Appointed: 22 September 1508
- Term ended: 14 July 1514
- Predecessor: Thomas Savage
- Successor: Thomas Wolsey

Orders
- Consecration: 12 December 1507 (Bishop)
- Created cardinal: 10 March 1511 by Julius II
- Rank: Cardinal priest of Santi Marcellino e Pietro (1511); Cardinal priest of Santa Prassede (1511–1514)

Personal details
- Born: c. 1462/1464 Hilton, near Appleby, Westmorland, England
- Died: 14 July 1514 (aged approximately 48/50) Rome, Papal States
- Buried: Chapel of St Thomas of Canterbury at the English hospice, Rome
- Denomination: Roman Catholic

Christopher Bainbridge (c. 1462/1464 – 14 July 1514) was an English cardinal. Of Westmorland origins, he was a nephew of Bishop Thomas Langton of Winchester, represented the continuation of Langton's influence and teaching and succeeded him in many of his appointments such as provost of The Queen's College in the University of Oxford. Towards the end of the reign of King Henry VII, he was successively Master of the Rolls, a Privy Counsellor, Dean of Windsor and Bishop of Durham. Becoming Archbishop of York and therefore Primate of England in 1508, he was sent as procurator of King Henry VIII to the papal court of Pope Julius II, where he was active in the diplomatic affairs leading to Henry's war against France and took part in the election of Julius's successor, Pope Leo X. He was murdered by poisoning in Italy in 1514 and was succeeded as Archbishop of York by Thomas Wolsey.

== Early life ==
Christopher Bainbridge was born in Hilton, Westmorland (then in the parish of St Michael Bongate, in Appleby), to an established local family with roots in Bainbridge, North Yorkshire. He was said to have been fifty years old at his death and must therefore have been born about 1464. A son of Reginald Bainbridge and Isobel Langton, he was a nephew and protégé of Thomas Langton of Appleby, Bishop of Winchester, a relationship formative in his ecclesiastical career. Hilton is due east of Appleby, on the eastern margin of the Vale of Eden where it rises into the Pennines.

It is supposed that Christopher received part of his education at The Queen's College, Oxford, although there is no surviving record of this. His uncle Langton had been a student of the college, and returned to it in 1487 as Provost, a post to which Bainbridge himself succeeded. He also studied law at Ferrara and Bologna. He was granted an indult in 1479 which allowed him to hold church benefices while still unordained and under the age of 16, and another in 1482 that allowed him to hold more than one benefice concurrently. His cousin Robert Langton "the pilgrim" (died 1524) was educated at Queen's College Oxford and there proceeded D.C.L. in 1501.

The appointment of Thomas Langton to the see of Salisbury left a vacancy for Bainbridge's presentation to the church of Pembridge, Herefordshire on 28 April 1485. He held the prebend of South Grantham (Lincolnshire) in the Salisbury diocese until February 1485/86, when he exchanged it for that of Chardstock, Dorset, and two months later received the prebend of Horton, Dorset, which he held until 1508. He was described as magister, or scientist, by 1486.

In the early 1490s he was named a chamberlain of the English Hospice in Rome and rented one of its houses. At Bologna he was admitted DCL in 1492; he was in Rome between 1492 and 1494. Having received the prebend of North Kelsey, Lincolnshire (in Lincoln cathedral) in 1495/96, which he held until 1500, he succeeded Thomas Langton as Provost of Queen's College in 1496. Langton was elected Archbishop of Canterbury but died in January 1500/01 before he could be installed. His will appointed Christopher Bainbridge one of his executors, and Bainbridge was one of three who swore to administer at probate in 1501. He may therefore have participated in the establishment of Langton's tomb and chantry in the chapel of St Birinus at Winchester Cathedral, and was certainly involved in setting up his chantry in Bongate, Appleby.

By 1497 he had become chaplain to king Henry VII, and in 1501 was named archdeacon of Surrey in the diocese of Winchester. Having been presented to the prebend of Strensall, North Riding of Yorkshire, in the cathedral of York in September 1503, in December of that year he became dean of York. He was appointed Master of the Rolls in 1504, and was incorporated at Lincoln's Inn on 20 January 1505: in the same year, being admitted to the Privy Council, he became Dean of St. George's Chapel, Windsor. He was appointed Bishop of Durham on 27 August 1507.

== Archbishop of York and Cardinal ==
Bainbridge was translated to York on 22 September 1508 (a sign of the favour he enjoyed at court), where his kinsman Dr Henry Machell, Doctor of both Laws in the University of Cambridge, became Commissary (holding the prebend of North Newbald), and Robert Langton his Treasurer (with the prebend of Weighton): both of them were admitted to the York Guild of Corpus Christi in 1510. Bainbridge attended the coronation of King Henry VIII on 23 June 1509, and on 24 September Henry appointed him to be his personal Orator, Procurator, Agent, Factor, Negotiator and Special Nuncio to the Roman Curia of Pope Julius II. In this mission, which occupied the remainder of his life, Bainbridge took with him a train including Richard Pace, who had studied in Oxford and in Padua as a protégé of Thomas Langton's, and held Bainbridge in great admiration.

Just at this time Julius had taken alarm at the invasion of Italy by Louis XII of France, and the support of England was therefore of great importance. It is said that Bainbridge, who was to support the cause of the Venetians, sent letters urging Henry to intervene against France, to provide a pretext to close the war in Italy and reignite it in France. The French historian Aubéry accuses Bainbridge of cunning and artifice, and of mixing his personal ambition to become a cardinal with the interests of his royal master. Julius left Rome to relieve Bologna, and was nearly taken prisoner in the war. A group of pro-French cardinals summoned a council in opposition to him at Pisa, which Julius opposed by calling another council at Rome, the Fifth Lateran Council, in the course of which he created (in March 1511) several new Cardinals, of whom Bainbridge was one, with the title of "Cardinal of St. Praxed's" or Santa Prassede.

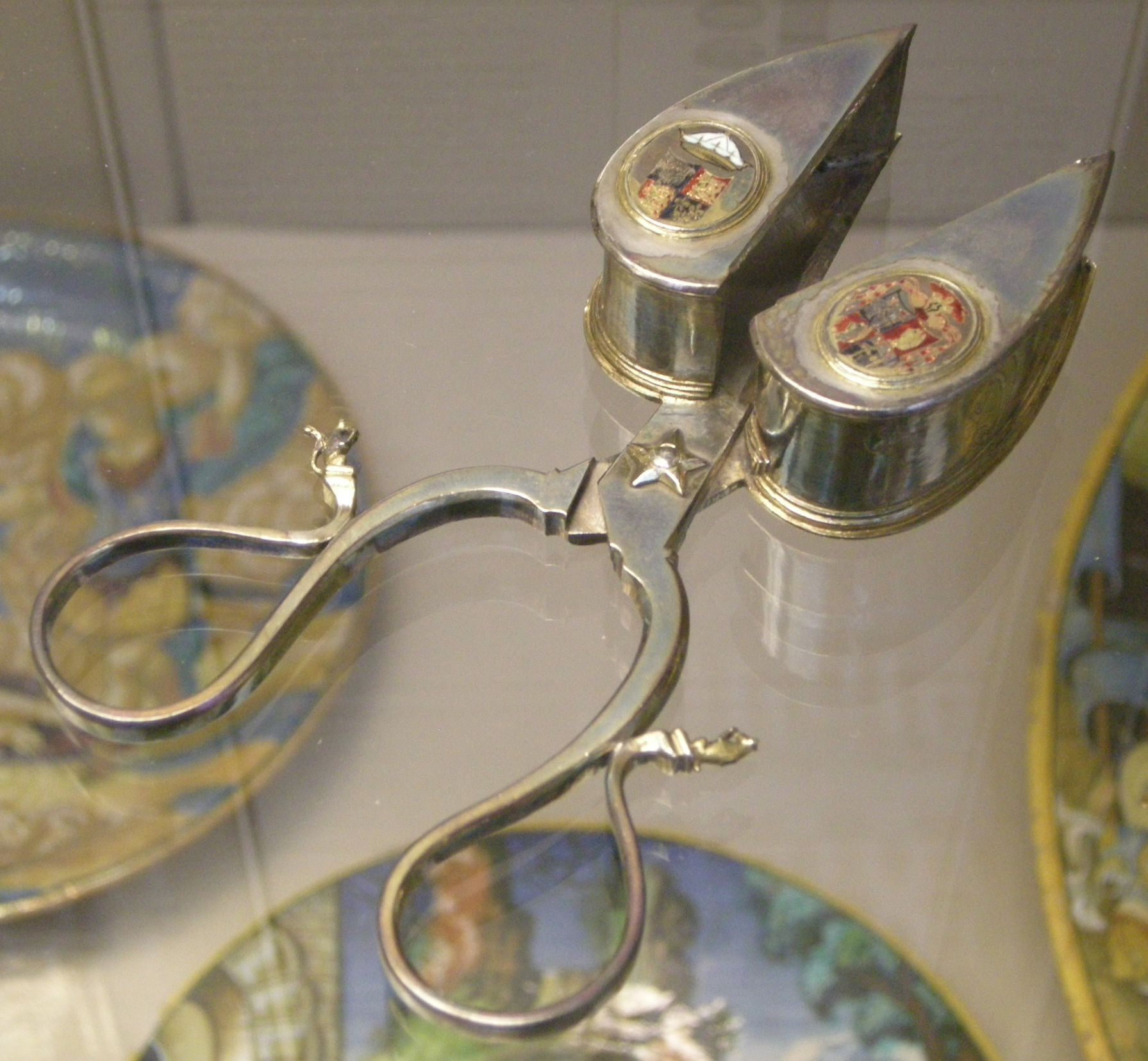
Armorial candle-snuffers, probably belonging to Cardinal Bainbridge, 1511-1514

Aubéry repeats what was said by Paride de' Grassi in his Life of Julius II concerning two occasions on which Bainbridge acted surprisingly while in Rome. On the first occasion, while he was still only Archbishop of York, he was required to make a speech of thanks before the Pope and the Sacred College, when the pope had bestowed upon King Henry the Golden Rose, a special token of Papal affection. Bainbridge had hardly begun his speech when he suddenly said nothing more by way of thanks or explanation, and left the conclave amidst much confusion.

A very similar thing happened a few days after his promotion as Cardinal, when it fell to him to pay a ceremonial visit to the Dean of the Sacred College and to make a speech of thanks and acknowledgement on behalf of himself and all the others who had been appointed Cardinals. De' Grassi, the Master of Ceremonies, had instructed him to make his speech under four simple points, first to magnify the dignity of Cardinal, second to lessen the merits of himself and his fellows, third to extol the beneficence of the Pope, and to conclude with thanks and the submission of their humble service. He went clean against these instructions and again cut his speech short. Bainbridge no doubt remembered that in accepting the sees of Durham and of York, he had renounced everything prejudicial to the king in the papal bulls, and had given his fealty to the king.

Bainbridge was immediately sent with an army to lay siege to Ferrara, but the creation of the Holy League relieved the papacy of some pressure by involving Spain against the French forces. In recognition of England's part in this formation Pope Julius granted the spiritual and temporal command of the castle and domain of Vetralla to Bainbridge (as representing the English crown) in 1511, and in 1512 the Cardinal had a marble sculpture incorporating his own arms and the English royal arms installed upon the grand stair of the palazzo comunale of Vetralla. Pope Julius II was succeeded on his death by Pope Leo X (Giovanni de' Medici), who was elected with the support of the della Rovere cardinals. Bainbridge took part in the 1513 papal conclave, where at the first scrutiny he himself received two votes, and gave his own vote to Fabrizio del Carretto, Grand Master of the Knights Hospitaller.

Pope Leo was initially willing to grant the title of Christianissimus Rex (Most Christian King) to Henry, after Francis had automatically forfeited the title by waging war on the Pope. Bainbridge's letter of September 1513 to King Henry concerning this, and the accompanying communication from Cardinal Marco Vigerio della Rovere, Bishop of Senigallia and Bishop of Palestrina, survive and provide a sample of his diplomatic style. However, Henry's making peace with France in 1514 probably ended these hopes.

Bainbridge obtained other Italian benefices, both at Vicenza and in the administration of San Giovanni Battista at Treviso: and by bull of 29 November 1513 he became Cardinal protector of the Cistercian Order. He and Matthäus Schiner, Bishop of Sion, had held out against Pope Leo's decision to rehabilitate the schismatic churchmen of the Council of Pisa (1511), the colleagues of Cardinal Federico Sanseverino and Bernardino López de Carvajal, and refused to attend the ceremony of their readmission.

The Liber Pontificalis of Archbishop Bainbridge, which is the latest surviving example of the Old English rite, and contains musical notation, was edited for the Surtees Society.

== Death ==
Bainbridge died on 14 July 1514, having been poisoned by a priest, Rinaldo de Modena, who acted as his steward or bursar, in revenge for a blow which the cardinal, a man of violent temper, had given him. (Diarmaid MacCulloch mentions the rumour that the two men may have been lovers.) Rinaldo was imprisoned and confessed to the crime. He also implicated Silvester de Giglis, then Bishop of Worcester, as the instigator of the plot. De Giglis was the resident English ambassador at Rome, and regarded Bainbridge as a threat to his position: he also had sufficient power and influence to make Rinaldo retract his confession and have him killed in prison. Richard Pace and John Clerk, the cardinal's executors, were eager to prosecute De Giglis, but he maintained that the priest was a madman whom he had dismissed from his own service some years before in England, and his defence was accepted as sufficient.

Bainbridge left two wills, one of them (on his becoming Archbishop) in English dated 21 September 1509, which is kept in the muniments of Queen's College, and one in Latin. Correspondence of Richard Pace with Thomas Wolsey concerning the late Cardinal's affairs survives. According to it, Richard Pace was the principal executor for the Cardinal's affairs in Italy, assisted by William Burbank, and both were associated with John Wythers in the administration of the Cardinal's estate in England, but Wythers had no part in the Italian estate.

== Legacy ==
=== Monument ===
Bainbridge was buried in the chapel of St Thomas of Canterbury at the English hospice in Rome, which later became the Venerable English College. His tomb is there represented by a white marble monument with a full-length recumbent effigy supported by two lions. The Latin epitaph reads:

"Christophoro Archiepiscopo Eboracensi S. Praxedis Presbytero Cardinali Angliae A Ivlio II Pontifice Maximo Ob Egregiam Operam S.R. Ecclesiae Præstitam Dvm Svi Regni Legatvs Esset Assvmpto Qvam Mox Domi Et Foris Castris Pontificiis Præfectvs Tvtatvs Est."
(In Memory of Christopher, Archbishop of York, and Cardinal Priest of St. Praxede; created by Pope Julius II, for the eminent services done by him to the Holy Roman Church, during his embassy from his own nation, and afterwards defending the same, both at home and abroad, as Legate of the Papal army.)

The effigy is likely to have formed the basis of the painted portrait of Bainbridge at The Queen's College, Oxford, which was made as an idealised representation during the 19th century by G. Francisi and is not a genuine Renaissance portrait.

=== Heraldry ===
The Vetralla monument provides a contemporary display of the quartering arms of Cardinal Bainbridge by showing (for Bainbridge), 1 & 4: Azure, two battle axes in pale argent, on a chief or two mullets gules pierced of the field, and (for ?), 2 & 3: Argent a squirrel sejant gules. These arms also appear on the British Museum candle-snuffer attributed to Bainbridge, in both cases surmounted by the cardinal's hat. The arms are also displayed in Ripon Minster.

=== Langton and Bainbridge chantry at Bongate, Appleby ===
Bainbridge left "Baldington" Manor (Toot Baldon), Oxfordshire to Queen's College, making provision for a chantry to be maintained by the college for himself and for Thomas Langton, and for the souls of their parents, in the church of St Michael in Bongate at Appleby. This was effectively the re-foundation of a chantry established by Thomas Langton at Bongate, intended to continue for 100 years, the maintenance of which Langton entrusted to his sister and brother-in-law, Roland and Elizabeth Machell (the Machell family had their seat at Crackenthorpe, in the same parish). Langton's executors, among them John Wythers and Christopher Bainbridge, used the surplus of his estate to purchase the manor of Helton Bacon, or Beacon (so-named for the beacon of Hilton Fell). The settlements of Hilton and Langton, now in Murton, were both formerly in St Michael Bongate. The manor was acquired in two moieties, each of which included lands and houses in Bongate. One moiety, to which a dwelling called Bongate Hall and many acres of meadow and pasture belonged, was sold by the executors to Roland Machell on trust that he would apply the rents and revenues to the chantry; and similarly the other moiety was in the hands of Christopher Bainbridge (whose parents were still living at Hilton), for the same uses.

At Bainbridge's death in 1514; the Langton chantry at Bongate was effectively incorporated with his own, and endowed with his bequest of Toot Baldon, to be managed by Queen's College. Roland Machell was still living, but died around 1520, when the Bongate Hall moiety passed into the hands of his son and heir Edmond Machell. The other Hilton moiety, in the tenure of Reginald Bainbridge, came into the hands of Thomas Bainbridge, Christopher's brother. Langton's executor John Wythers continued to seek redress for the revenues and arrearages from both parts of the manor, and sold the Hilton moiety in 1524 to the Revd Edward Hilton of Bletchingdon in Oxfordshire, who made a conveyance to John Pantre, Provost (1515–1541) of Queen's College. Edmond Machell also died, 2 February 1521/22, holding the Bongate Hall moiety, though Thomas Bainbridge also held those deeds. Edmond's widow Alice remarried to Nicholas Rudd and claimed the moiety for herself and as the inheritance of her son John Machell, who at the age of 18 in November 1527 was found by Edmond Machell's inquisition post mortem, then held, to be his father's heir. Cardinal Wolsey ordered Rudd to accept the decision of the Duke of Richmond's council in this matter, but in November 1527 Rudd had ignored three summonses and was believed to have gone to London.

The records of Queen's College show that the Bongate chantry under the Bainbridge endowment remained active until the Dissolution, and pensions were still being paid to proxies into the 1570s. Robert Langton established the free school at Bongate.

Catholic Church titles
Preceded by Geoffrey Blithe	Dean of York; 1503–1505	Succeeded by James Harrington
Preceded by Christopher Urswick	Dean of Windsor; 1505–1507	Succeeded by Thomas Hobbes
Preceded by William Senhouse	Bishop of Durham; 1507–1508	Succeeded by Thomas Ruthall
Preceded by Thomas Savage	Archbishop of York; 1508–1514	Succeeded by Thomas Wolsey
