= Listed buildings in Murton, Cumbria =

Murton is a civil parish in Westmorland and Furness, Cumbria, England. It contains eleven listed buildings that are recorded in the National Heritage List for England. Of these, two are listed at Grade II*, the middle of the three grades, and the others are at Grade II, the lowest grade. The parish contains the villages of Murton and Hilton and the hamlet of Brackenber, and is otherwise rural. Most of the listed buildings are houses and associated structures, farmhouses and farm buildings, the other buildings consisting of two village pumps, a bridge, and a disused railway viaduct.

== Key ==
Grade	Criteria
II*	Particularly important buildings of more than special interest
II	Buildings of national importance and special interest

== Buildings ==
Name and location	Photograph	Date	Notes	Grade
Murton Hall, store and wall 54.59035°N 2.42032°W		14th century	There have been later alterations and additions. The hall is in sandstone with quoins, and it has a green slate roof with stone coping. There are two storeys, six bays, and a rear outshut. On the front is an embattled porch and a doorway with three shields on the lintel. To the right of the porch is a five-light transomed hall window; the other windows are mullioned and have hood moulds. To the east is a lower two-storey store-room with an ornate 14th-century window head above a doorway. At the rear is an area wall that incorporates the pointed head of a 14th-century window.	II*
Brackenber Hall and garage 54.57045°N 2.42843°W	—	17th century	Originally two houses, later a house and a garage, in stone and with quoins. The house has a stone-flagged roof with coped gables, and the garage has a slated roof. The house has two storeys with attics and five bays. The doorway has an architrave, with windows are mullioned, there is a continuous hood mould above the ground floor windows and a string course above the upper floor windows.The garage has two storeys, a large opening, a plank door, and a mullioned window.	II*
Barn, Murton Hall; 54.59060°N 2.42032°W	—	17th century	This was built as a wing to Murton Hall, and later used as a barn. It is in stone with [[quoin (architecture)|quoins, and has a slate roof with stone-flagged eaves. The windows were mullioned with hood moulds, but most have been blocked.	II
Brackenber Farmhouse and byres 54.56948°N 2.43131°W	—	1698	The farmhouse is the earliest part, the byre is dated 1742, and an extension to the house is dated 1874. The buildings are in stone with quoins, and have slate roofs with stone coping. The house has two storeys, the original part has two bays, and the extension, which is higher, also has two bays. Above the doorway is an inscribed and dated lintel, and the windows are sashes. The byre has two doors, three windows, and a moulded frame with an inscription and date.	II
Hilton Hall and Cottage; 54.58009°N 2.41568°W	—	1683	A cottage was added to the west of the farmhouse, and later integrated into it. The house is in stone with quoins and it has a green slate roof with stone-flagged eaves. There are two storeys, four bays, a single-storey extension and an outshut at the rear. On the front is a gabled porch, and the windows are mullioned.	II
Pump, Midtown Farm; 54.58057°N 2.41330°W		18th century (possible)	The pump is in ashlar stone, and is about 5 feet (1.5 m) tall. It is square and has a pyramidal top, a ball finial, and a tap replacing the original handle.	II
Pump, Town Head Farm; 54.58097°N 2.41171°W	—	18th century (possible)	The pump is in ashlar stone, and is about 5 feet (1.5 m) tall. It is square with a pyramidal top and a tap replacing the original handle.	II
Threshing barn and stable, Hilton Hall; 54.57996°N 2.41532°W	—	1764	The barn and stable are in stone with quoins. The barn has a slate roof with stone-flagged eaves, and the stable has a stone-flagged roof. They contain a segmental-arched cart entrance and doors.	II
Bridge, Hilton Mill; 54.58197°N 2.41418°W		Late 18th century (probable)	The bridge carries a track over Hilton Beck. It is in stone, and consists of a single segmental arch with a span of about 20 feet (6.1 m). The bridge has voussoirs, a string course, and parapets about 3 feet (0.91 m) high with chamfer]]ed copings. It surface is tarmac over cobbles.	II
Threshing barn (south), Hilton Hall; 54.57974°N 2.41534°W	—	Late 18th to early 19th century	The barn is in stone with quoins and has a hipped slate roof. It contains two wagon entrances, one with an elliptical head, and the other with a segmental head, and a byre doorway with a segmental head.	II
Coupland Beck Viaduct; 54.56231°N 2.45744°W		1861	The viaduct was built by the North Eastern Railway to carry its Eden Valley Branch over Coupland Beck. It carried a single track, but is no longer in use. The viaduct is in sandstone, and consists of five semi-elliptical arches carried on tapering piers. It has a stone parapet with cast iron railings.	II
