= Listed buildings in Dufton =

Listed buildings in Cumbria, UK

Dufton is a civil parish in Westmorland and Furness, Cumbria, England. It contains eleven listed buildings that are recorded in the National Heritage List for England. All the listed buildings are designated at Grade II, the lowest of the three grades, which is applied to "buildings of national importance and special interest". The parish contains the village of Dufton and the surrounding countryside. Most of the listed buildings are houses and associated structures, farmhouses and farm buildings in the village centre. Also in the village is a listed pump. Away from the centre of the village, and listed, are a church, its rectory and structures in the rectory garden.

== Buildings ==
Name and location	Photograph	Date	Notes
Dufton Hall; 54.61967°N 2.48096°W		Late 17th century	A large house that was extended in the 18th century, and subsequently subdivided, in stone and with slate roofs. The main block has quoins, bands and an eaves cornice. There are three storeys and five bays, and at the front are a pedimented Roman Doric doorcase and sash windows. Projecting to the right is a two-storey wing with a hipped roof, and a two-storey bay window on the south end. To the left of the main block is the original 17th-century two-storey three-bay house. At the rear of the house are round-headed windows with imposts and projecting keystones.
Ghyll House and outbuildings 54.62009°N 2.48224°W		Early 18th century	The farmhouse and outbuildings form three sides of a courtyard, and they have slate roofs. At they front they are stuccoed. and at the rear they are pebbledashed. The house has two storeys and three bays. There is a central doorway with a two-storey canted bay window to the right. The windows are sashes. The house has been extended by two bays to the barn to the left, which has casement windows. Among the outbuildings at the rear is a gin-gang that protrudes into the courtyard.
House and barn, Brow Farm; 54.61798°N 2.47595°W		1769	The house and barn are in sandstone with rusticated quoins and have a slate roof with stone copings. The house has two storeys and six bays. Over the door is a projecting semicircular hood, and above this is an inscribed and dated panel with a moulded frame. The windows are either sashes or fixed. The barn to the right has a segmental-arched wagon entrance, a door and a window.
Midtown Farmhouse and barn 54.62055°N 2.48368°W		Late 18th century	The farmhouse is stuccoed with quoins, and has a roof of stone flags at the rear and Welsh slate at the front, with stone copings. There are two storeys and six bays. Above the doorway is part of a former moulded pediment. The windows in the ground floor are sashes, and above are horizontally-sliding sashes. To the rear is a barn range containing a segmental-headed cart entrance and a doorway.
Sycamore House; 54.62047°N 2.48347°W	—	Late 18th century	A sandstone house that has a slate roof with stone copings. There are two storeys and five bays, and the windows are sashes.
St Cuthbert's Church; 54.62996°N 2.48967°W		1784	The church was built on a medieval site, re-using some medieval material, and it was restored in 1853. It is in sandstone with a slate roof, and consists of a nave, a chancel with a north vestry and a west tower. The tower has a doorway with a pointed head, and an embattled parapet with corner pinnacles topped by spirelets. All the windows have pointed heads and hood moulds. Incorporated in the south wall are a Roman or Anglo-Saxon figure and a 13th-century coffin lid. Inside the church is a west gallery.
The Rectory; 54.62963°N 2.49033°W	—	1821	The rectory is in sandstone with quoins, and has a slate roof. There are two storeys and four bays. Steps lead up to the doorway that has an architrave, a cornice, and a dated and inscribed lintel. The windows are sashes with stone surrounds.
Wall, summer house, entrance arch, and ha-ha, The Rectory; 54.62935°N 2.49050°W	—	1821	The wall encloses the garden, it is in sandstone with quoins and flat copings, and it contains two doors. On the east side is a lean-to summer house with a slate roof, and also on this side is a semicircular entrance arch with Tuscan columns and an entablature. To the west is a ha-ha wall.
Pump; 54.61987°N 2.48293°W		Late 19th century	The pump is on Dufton village green, and was erected by the London Lead Company. It has a circular plan and has a stone plinth and a basin with a roll-moulded rim. A stuccoed column rises from the basin and has a cast iron lion's head water spout. On top of the column is a ball, and on the side is a Latin quotation by Ovid.
Walls, railings and gate, Brow Farmhouse; 54.61793°N 2.47605°W	—	Undated	The low wall in front of the forecourt is in stone with chamfered coping. On it are wrought iron railings that have spearhead standards. The gate posts are in cast iron and have urn finials, and the wrought iron gate has scrolled decoration.
Walls and gate piers, Dufton Hall; 54.61928°N 2.48150°W	—	Undated	There is a pair of gate piers and a pair of end piers, the former being larger. All are rusticated with a cruciform plan, and have moulded bases and corniced stepped tops, The gate piers are joined to the end piers by serpentine ashlar walls that have moulded plinths and semicircular copings.
