= Listed buildings in Milburn, Cumbria =

Milburn is a civil parish in Westmorland and Furness, Cumbria, England. It contains 15 listed buildings that are recorded in the National Heritage List for England. Of these, one is listed at Grade I, the highest of the three grades, and the others are at Grade II, the lowest grade. The parish contains the village of Milburn and the surrounding countryside. The largest building in the parish is Howgill House, originally a fortified house, and later a country house; this and structures associated with it are listed. Apart from a church, all the other listed buildings are located in the village and are centred round The Green.

== Key ==
Grade	Criteria
I	Buildings of exceptional interest, sometimes considered to be internationally important
II	Buildings of national importance and special interest

== Buildings ==
Name and location	Photograph	Date	Notes	Grade
St Cuthbert's Church; 54.65537°N 2.54084°W		13th century	The church is in stone on a chamfered plinth, with quoins, and has a slate roof with stone-flagged eaves. It consists of a nave, a chancel and a south aisle in a single cell. At the west end is a gabled double bellcote with finials, and at the east end is an apex cross. On the south side is a re-set Late Norman round-headed doorway.	II
Howgill Castle; 54.65775°N 2.52059°W	—	14th century	Originally a fortified house, it was later transformed into a country house. In the late 17th century the battlements and corner towers were removed, an extension was added and the windows were changed; further alterations were made in 1733, resulting in an H-shaped plan with hall and cross-wings. The house is in sandstone, partly pebbledashed, and has slate roofs, partly hipped. There are two storeys with attics, and a front of five bays. Most of the windows are sashes, a few are mullioned, and one is mullioned and transomed. The central doorway has an architrave and a pediment.	I
Milburn House; 54.65768°N 2.53519°W	—	Early 18th century (probable)	The house is pebbledashed on the front and sides. It has quoins, an eaves cornice with a plain parapet, and a roof of 20th-century concrete tiles. There are two storeys and a symmetrical front of three bays. In the centre is a porch with Greek Doric columns and a cornice, and a doorway with an architrave and a rectangular traceried fanlight. The windows are sashes in stone surrounds.	II
Milburn House Farmhouse; 54.65782°N 2.53473°W	—	Early 18th century	A farmhouse that was later extended, it is in stone on a boulder plinth, with quoins and it has a slate roof with coping to the south. There are two storeys, five bays, and a doorway with a segmental-arched head. The windows in the ground floor of the original part are mullioned casements, and in the upper floor and in the extension they are sashes.	II
Cross Fell Cottage; 54.65848°N 2.53541°W	—	1753	A sandstone house with quoins and a slate roof with stone coping. There are two storeys and a symmetrical front of three bays. Above the door is a lintel with a dated panel, and the windows are mullioned three-light casements with stone surrounds.	II
Sunny Mount; 54.65893°N 2.53384°W	—	Mid to late 18th century	A stone house with rusticated quoins and a Welsh slate roof. There are two storeys and a symmetrical front of three bays. In the centre is a gabled porch and a door in an architrave, and the windows are sashes, also in architraves.	II
Eastgate; 54.65825°N 2.53351°W	—	Late 18th to early 19th century	Originally a house and a cottage, later combined into one dwelling, it is stuccoed with rusticated quoins and a slate roof. There are two storeys, the original house has three bays, and the former cottage to the right has one bay. Above the door is a cornice, and the windows are sashes in stone surrounds.	II
Garth Cottage; 54.65834°N 2.53305°W	—	Late 18th to early 19th century	A stone house with rusticated quoins and a slate roof with stone copings. It has two storeys, three bays, and an outshut at the rear. There is a central doorway with a pedimented plaque above it, and the windows are casements.	II
Barn and byre range with gin gang, Milburn House Farm; 54.65764°N 2.53475°W	—	Late 18th to early 19th century	The range is at right angles to the farmhouse, and linked to it by an arch. The range is in stone with slate roofs. At the left is a coach house and stables in an L-shaped plan that has openings with segmental heads and a hayloft. To the right is a barn with a central wagon door and other doors, all with segmental heads, and projecting at the rear is a semicircular gin gang.	II
Gate piers, Howgill Castle; 54.65741°N 2.52029°W	—	Mid 19th century (probable)	The gate piers are square and rusticated, and are about 15 feet (4.6 m) high. Each pier has a moulded cornice and a ball finial. Between them are wrought iron gates dated 1980.	II
Walls, gates and gate piers, Milburn House; 54.65772°N 2.53539°W	—	19th century (probable)	The low walls enclosing the garden of the house are in stone with segmental coping. The gate and end piers have moulded bases and square pyramidal tops. On the walls are cast iron railings, and the double gates are also in cast iron.	II
Barn near Garth Cottage; 54.65812°N 2.53298°W	—	Mid to late 19th century	The barn is in stone with quoins, and has a roof partly stone-flagged and partly slated. There is a symmetrical front of three bays, with outshuts at the sides. The barn contains a central segmental-headed wagon entrance flanked by unglazed windows.	II
Netherley; 54.65790°N 2.53451°W	—	Mid to late 19th century	The house has a stuccoed front, rusticated quoins, and a Welsh slate roof. There are two storeys and a symmetrical front of three bays. In the centre is a doorway with a Tuscan doorcase, a broken pediment, and a semicircular fanlight. The windows are sashes in stone surrounds.	II
Outbuildings and sawmill, Howgill Castle; 54.65767°N 2.51950°W	—	Late 19th century {probable)	The buildings surround the four sides of a courtyard and include barns, byres, wagon sheds and a sawmill. They are in stone with hipped Welsh slate roofs. The openings include three segmental-headed wagon entrances. In the north range was a steam threshing mill, and a sawmill with an undershot waterwheel.	II
Walls, Milburn House Farmhouse; 54.65792°N 2.53488°W	—	Undated	The walls on the front and sides of the garden are in stone with segmental coping and are 3 feet (0.91 m) high. The gate piers are rusticated and have domical pyramidal capitals.	II

== Sources ==
- Historic England, "Church of St Cuthbert, Milburn (1144917)", National Heritage List for England
- Historic England, "Howgill Castle, Milburn (1051098)", National Heritage List for England
- Historic England, "Milburn House, Milburn (1326990)", National Heritage List for England
- Historic England, "Milburn House Farmhouse, Milburn (1052373)", National Heritage List for England
- Historic England, "Cross Fell Cottage, Milburn (1144957)", National Heritage List for England
- Historic England, "Sunny Mount, Milburn (1144958)", National Heritage List for England
- Historic England, "Eastgate, Milburn (1372869)", National Heritage List for England
- Historic England, "Garth Cottage, Milburn (1051082)", National Heritage List for England
- Historic England, "Byre and barn range with gin-gang adjoining south end of Milburn House Farmhouse, Milburn (1052343)", National Heritage List for England
- Historic England, "Gate piers to south-east of Howgill Castle, Milburn (1326969)", National Heritage List for England
- Historic England, "Forecourt walls, gate, gate piers and railings to front of Milburn House, Milburn (1052347)", National Heritage List for England
- Historic England, "Bank barn to south-east of Garth Cottage, Milburn (1326970)", National Heritage List for England
- Historic England, "Netherley, Milburn (1144959)", National Heritage List for England
- Historic England, "Barns, byres, wagon sheds and saw-mill to north-east of Howgill Castle, Milburn (1051073)", National Heritage List for England
- Historic England, "Front and return garden walls to Milburn House Farmhouse, Milburn (1326971)", National Heritage List for England
- Historic England, Listed Buildings
- Hyde, Matthew; Pevsner, Nikolaus (2010) [1967], Cumbria, The Buildings of England, New Haven and London: Yale University Press, ISBN 978-0-300-12663-1
