= Milburn, Cumbria =

Village and civil parish in Cumbria, England

Coordinates: 54.657°N 2.536°W

Milburn
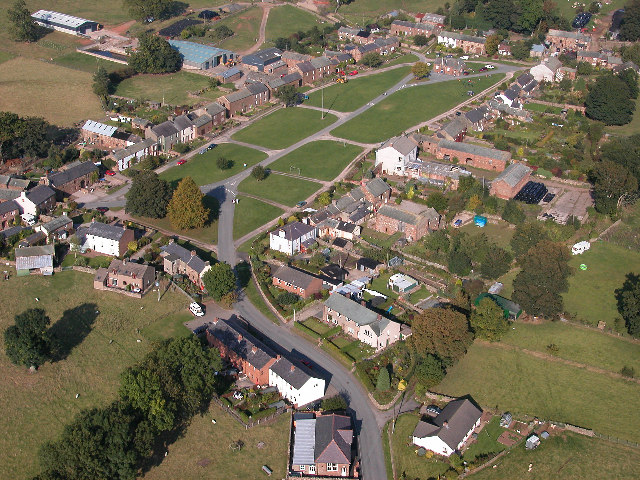
- Milburn

- Location within Cumbria
- Population: 198 (2021 census)
- OS grid reference: NY655293
- Civil parish: Milburn
- Unitary authority: Westmorland and Furness
- Ceremonial county: Cumbria
- Region: North West
- Country: England
- Sovereign state: United Kingdom
- Post town: Penrith
- Postcode district: CA10
- Dialling code: 017683
- Police: Cumbria
- Fire: Cumbria
- Ambulance: North West
- UK Parliament: Westmorland and Lonsdale

Milburn is a small village and civil parish in the Westmorland and Furness district of Cumbria, England. It is located on the northern side of the Eden Valley, about 9 miles (14.5 km) east of Penrith. The parish had a population of 198 at the 2021 census.

It lies beneath Cross Fell, the highest point of the Pennines and is one of a chain of villages following the 200 metres (660 ft) contour of the escarpment. The fellside forms part of the North Pennines Area of Natural Beauty which in 2003 was awarded the status of UNESCO European Geopark and includes the Moorhouse Upper Teesdale national nature reserve. The parish includes the outlying hamlets of Gullom Holme and Milburn Grange, respectively 0.5 miles (0.8 km) and 1.25 miles (2.0 km) from Milburn village centre.

The core village consists of a tight cluster of houses, many dating from the mid-18th century, ranged around a roughly rectangular green. The village has a medieval church, a fortified manor house and a primary school.

== History ==
The most striking feature of Milburn is the consistency of its layout. This appears to imply a high degree of planning, and the history of the village may most usefully be described in this context.

The houses round the green present a continuous frontage broken only by narrow lanes giving access to the farmyards, barns and fields which lie behind. Roads and tracks enter at the corners of the green and access is so restricted at some points that it has been suggested that the village has been constructed on defensive lines – possibly against the Border reivers. Disappointingly, however, no buildings from "reiving" times (late 13th to the end of the 16th century) survive, at least within the vicinity of the green itself. In fact the earliest structures here date from the mid-18th century, with the majority reflecting a major period of rebuilding in the 19th century. The quality of these buildings, however, is of such interest that Milburn has been selected by Brunskill to provide an exemplar of Lake District architecture.

Milburn Field System: OS 1900

That Milburn had an earlier history on its present site is clearly signalled by the field-system radiating from the existing village. The evidence of a typical medieval layout is plain to see, with long narrow fields separated by hedges where groups of strips from the old open town fields have been brought together. This evidence is further underlined by remnants of ridge and furrow in many of the fields. However, Roberts argues that village development was taking place in most cases before 1200 and in some cases as much as two centuries earlier.

Brennand states that cereal pollen dating to 4000BC has been found at Howgill on the outskirts of the village. Goodchild describes evidence of hut circles and other traces of early occupation on the fell side above Milburn at NY69700/30290, NY69230/32120 and NY68720/32700. A bronze celt was found in a field above Lounthwaite to the west of the village. Further afield there are presumed Iron Age "farmsteads" at Kirkland and Dufton.

That there was a time during the civilised period when there was no significant occupation at all on the present site is strongly suggested by the fact that the main road from Dufton to Blencarn by-passes the modern village entirely, running to the south between the modern green and the church.

This road has unusual features. It is noticeably straight and, between Long Marton and Milburn, it is known as High Street. Then, as it goes past Milburn, it becomes Low Street. Richardson has suggested that it is a very ancient track way (based on alignment considerations). Butterworth postulates that it may be Roman (from naming evidence and its straightness). The main point is that the road appears to be of ancient origin and takes no account of the village

The existence of other significant relics of occupation outside the present village area suggests that when significant nucleated settlement did occur it initially happened elsewhere. In particular, the existence of the church to the south of the modern village strongly suggests that the initial focus of settlement (as opposed to isolated farmsteads) was here. The church, together with the churchyard, occupies a neck of land bounded by two becks flowing in steep-sided ravines which contain several natural strong-running springs. One of these at NY 649/292 is so voluminous and reliable that in recent years it has been capped as a farm supply. In a copse at NY 657/292 there is yet another spring. This is known as Keld Well and is believed by Page to have had religious significance as a place of pilgrimage. A second possibility for a site of settlement is the curious wiggle in Low Street at the point where the road from Newbiggin crosses to enter the outskirts of the present village. This might well be the fossil record of some sort of hamlet.

It seems possible, therefore, that the unusual coherence of the layout of Milburn on its present site arises from the fact that when settlement finally took place the site was still largely or wholly undeveloped. This further suggests a concerted, motivated development.

According to Butterworth, the first documentary reference to "Milburn" dates from 1200/1 when King John (1199–1215) granted the forest of Milburn to William de Stuteville, lord of the barony of Cottingham near Hull. The term "forest" in this context refers to an area suitable for hunting rather than forestry in its modern sense. This in does not imply that the modern village dates from this period, nor that there was necessarily a "Burn" and a "Mill" here. Goodchild argues that the name is actually derived from Mil Borran, meaning a stone by a Roman road. On the edge of the road at the entrance to the lonning leading to the church at NY65360/29165 there is an ancient stone which is registered on the Sites and Monuments Record (SMR) as a cross base. Nevertheless, there was evidently a settlement somewhere in the vicinity which projected at least the continuity of its name into modern times.

The prospect of planned settlement actually arises rather earlier with an entry in the Anglo-Saxon Chronicle for 1092 which refers to King William (Rufus) travelling north to Carlisle with a large army, restoring the town, raising the castle and driving out Dolfin who earlier had ruled the land there. It goes on to say: "[He] afterwards returned south here and sent very many peasants there with women and with livestock to live there to till that land."

Whatever the precise stimulus and the exact date of the migration of the village to its present site, it must have occurred in time to create the medieval field system. Butterworth argues that the most likely date would have been around 1340 to coincide with the construction of Howgill castle, although he accepts that an earlier date, prompted by raids into England by De Bruys in 1311 would also be possible. He points out that once the Lancasters became Lords of the Manor soon after 1335, they had a direct vested interest in protecting both their tenants and their tenants livestock, so that the laying out of a defensible village and the building of Howgill Castle might have gone hand in hand.

Milburn Village Layout OS 1859

== Geography ==
The village stands on a shelf of Saint Bees sandstone, overlain here by a thick layer of glacial deposits. This sandstone underlies most of the Eden Valley and, in fact, runs right beneath the volcanic deposits of the Lake District to emerge eventually on the Solway coast, whence its name. It is quarried locally at numerous sites and has provided the principal building material for most of the older houses in the village. Its soft, red colouration gives the village a warm, welcoming appearance, a characteristic of the whole Eden Valley.

The glacial deposits have given rise to heavy, fertile soils which are suitable for both arable and livestock farming. The soils also contain many rounded boulders of varying sizes which, because of their hardness provide a valuable building material to augment the softer, easily worked sandstone. The larger boulders are frequently seen in use as building foundations, while the smaller cobbles are widely employed in the drystone field-walls which form another characteristic feature of the area.

The village is bounded both to the north and to the south by geological faults. The southerly fault (the Lounthwaite Fault) is considered particularly important in relation to the development of the village as it is associated with a line of strong-running springs. These may have been attractive to early settlers.

Higher up the fell side to the north, the St Bees sandstone is overlain by limestone. A number of ruined lime kilns and small quarries indicate that the limestone has been burnt in the past to produce lime for building and agricultural purposes. Lime makes an excellent mortar for sandstone buildings. Spread on the land it also reduces the acidity of soil and improves its fertility.

Further to the north still, sandwiched between these intake fields and the steep slopes of the Pennine escarpment itself lies a complex geological zone known as the Cross Fell inlier. It consists of a lens of older rocks faulted upwards between the much younger layers that bound it. The whole North Pennines AONB, of which the inlier forms part, is in fact of such interest to geologists that in 2003 it was designated a Geopark under a Unesco programme to promote public interest in geology.

From an agricultural perspective, however, the Geopark is simply an area of poorly drained grazing that becomes progressively less useful as its altitude increases. Nevertheless, the lower slopes of the inlier are still sufficiently valuable to be enclosed, largely with drystone walling, and are used for grazing sheep and cattle. Fell ponies are also raised here. Immediately above the village, this area is known as Red Carle.

Still further to the north, the steep fellsides above the Inlier are unenclosed and grazed exclusively by sheep. In the past this would perhaps be best described as "ranching" as, in the summer the sheep would range freely over the top of the Pennine escarpment and down into Teesdale. Regular "gathers" would be held to round them up for dipping and shearing. Much has changed in this respect, however, since the foot-and-mouth outbreak of 2001. The "hefted" herds which had previously acquired a useful territorial instinct were all lost and are now only slowly being replaced. The old "commoner" system, whereby grazing (and other) rights were granted exclusively to individuals, has also been bought out by English Nature, concerned about the effect of over-grazing. Sheep numbers are now closely controlled. English Nature is also attempting to develop the diversity of the fell side habitat and has planted selected areas with hardy indigenous species such as juniper. A particular aim is to re-introduce the black grouse to the area.

The Moorhouse nature reserve is entered immediately above the intake wall, the final drystone wall of the enclosed grazing. The reserve stretches right over the Pennine ridge and down into Teesdale. It is a wilderness area traversed in the east-west direction by the Pennine Way which runs along the very crest of the escarpment. During winter months, conditions up here are best described as Arctic.

The higher fellsides are also rich in mineral deposits and were formerly mined extensively. A typical site situated just above the Middle Tongue Beck at NY 692/321 is known as the New Greuve Shop and seems to have yielded a variety of minerals ranging from coal to lead. This level is of particular interest as a large rock above the entrance has been inscribed with the initials of some of the miners. Some of these belong to families whose descendants still live in Milburn. The largest mine in the area, Silver Band, is outside Milburn parish but was a major source of employment in the village. Miners would walk to work—a journey taking about two hours in each direction and involving a climb from Milburn of around 800 metres.

=== Climate ===
Many of the villages on the Eden Valley's eastern fell side are subject to the Helm Wind and Milburn is no exception. The swirling, noisy gusts are a frequent feature of life in the village. Uttley has written a detailed account of the effects of the wind and provided a detailed theory of its causes. The wind is experienced when the wind blows from the north-east. Many houses appear to have been constructed with the Helm in mind and window areas in this direction have been kept to a minimum.

== Demographics ==
At the 2021 census, Milburn had a population of 198 people in 82 households.

Census population of Milburn parish
| Census | Population | Female | Male | Households | Source |
|---|---|---|---|---|---|
| 2001 | 171 | 89 | 82 | 65 | |
| 2011 | 171 | 87 | 84 | 74 | |
| 2021 | 198 | 96 | 102 | 82 | |

Agriculture still provided the single most significant source of employment and this accounted for approximately 25% of the employment of the working population. A number of businesses offering professional and construction services now operate in the village, and local non-agricultural work accounted for the employment of a further 20%. The remaining 55% commuted out of the village to their employment. Of the total population, 30% were retired.

== Landmarks ==
=== Howgill Castle ===
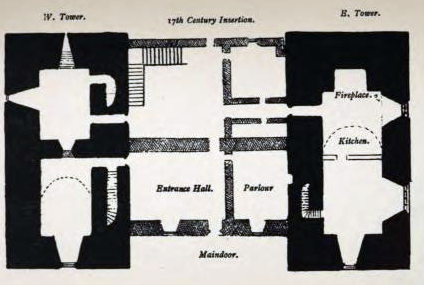
Plan of Howgill Castle

Howgill Castle is a fortified manor house lying approximately 1 km to the east of the main village and at a slightly higher elevation. Butterworth believes that it dates from about 1340. It is defended to the north west by a deep ravine and commands extensive views. The original structure is more or less completely disguised by substantial 17th century modifications, but within the unremarkable shell created by this later work lie two three-storey towers, each 64 feet by 33 feet with walls about 9/10 feet thick connected by a wall over ten feet thick and over 40 feet long. This wall contains two superimposed flights of stairs providing communication between the towers. Originally, the ground floors of each tower were accessible only from the first floor. The position of the original entrance in this unusual scheme is unknown.

The west tower now contains a door removed from Appleby prison.

=== St Cuthbert's Church ===
St Cuthbert's Church lies in an isolated position about 0.5 km across fields to the south west of the village. Although Pevsner considers the sandstone masonry of the chancel to be Norman, it is claimed that the body of St Cuthbert rested here in 876 when monks from Lindisfarne fleeing the Viking invaders toured the county bearing the holy relics of their saint with them. The clue here is in the dedication of the church. If the legend were true it would imply that the present building had an earlier precursor.

The site, with its secluded position above the deep ravine of Stank Beck and its association with nearby strongly-flowing springs is extremely difficult to interpret. Page argues for a correlation between springs and pre-Christian worship at the site of modern-day churches in Cumbria. He includes Milburn in his lists.

Following the departure of the Romans, the Saxons built churches for Christian worship, and the present structure contains re-used stones, some with sundial markings, which can be seen arranged haphazard in the masonry. The current building consists of a nave chancel and south aisle.

In the thirteenth century, Robert de Veteripont 1st Baron of Westmorland received the Chapel of Milnebourne from King John. To the church the present nave was added. The north wall had two windows and the west wall one.

In the fourteenth century, Edward II seized the properties of the Knights Templar, who had been founded to protect pilgrims to Jerusalem. An effigy of a Knight Templar was sent from Temple Sowerby to Milburn and placed against the south wall, where it still stands. The west windows were re-set. The two arches were rebuilt to stand as now on the south side. An aumbry (a recess to store sacred vessels near the altar) with a pointed arch, in the south wall of the chancel belongs to this period.

In the seventeenth century, Sir Richard Sandforth of Howgill extended the south side and put a third window there in memory of his wife Anne. The church received its 'chalise and paten' in 1633 and in 1669 the 'bellcot' was erected.

In the eighteenth century the south windows were altered in imitation sixteenth century style.

In the nineteenth century, seven years after Queen Victoria's jubilee, a major reconstruction took place. A new bellcote was built, retaining the old finials. A new north window was added, matching the south windows. The west window was restored where the doorway had been, and the south door which had been bricked up was re-opened. The old oak box pews were removed and there panels placed against the walls. The east window was redesigned and revealed a coffin lid dated c. 1300 used as a memorial to a one time Rural Dean, with shears to cut the tonsure of the priesthood.

The church (extensively restored in 1894) still retains its unpretentious character. It consists of a nave, chancel and south aisle, part of which is now the porch and vestry. There is a small bellcote. The south door is late Norman and a number of decorated stones of Norman date are set into the exterior of the south wall.

=== Methodist Chapel ===
The former Methodist Wesleyan Chapel located at the west end of the Green is now a private residence. It was built in 1834 and accommodated 90 seated. Butterworth estimates that by the 1860s half of the village's population were probably Methodists. However, the size of the congregation declined steeply during the late 20th century and the chapel closed in 1989.

=== Maypole ===
In the centre of the Green, sited on a small mound known as Butt Hill, stands a Maypole. It is some 20 metres (66 ft) high and is topped by a heavy metal weather cock. Such maypoles are a common feature of villages in the Eden valley and there has been a maypole on this site in Milburn for at least 150 years. There is no tradition of "dancing round the maypole" here however and the weather vane is the only useful feature. Nevertheless, the maypole is obviously much-loved by the village, perhaps as a link with earlier times, and it has been replaced frequently over the years. The maypole erected in 1995 at the expense of the lord of the manor displayed a pronounced lean which may have been due to the fact that it was struck by lightning shortly after its installation. The present Maypole was erected in 2014 after it was agreed by the school and parish council that the old one was becoming unsafe.

== Culture and community ==
=== Field names ===
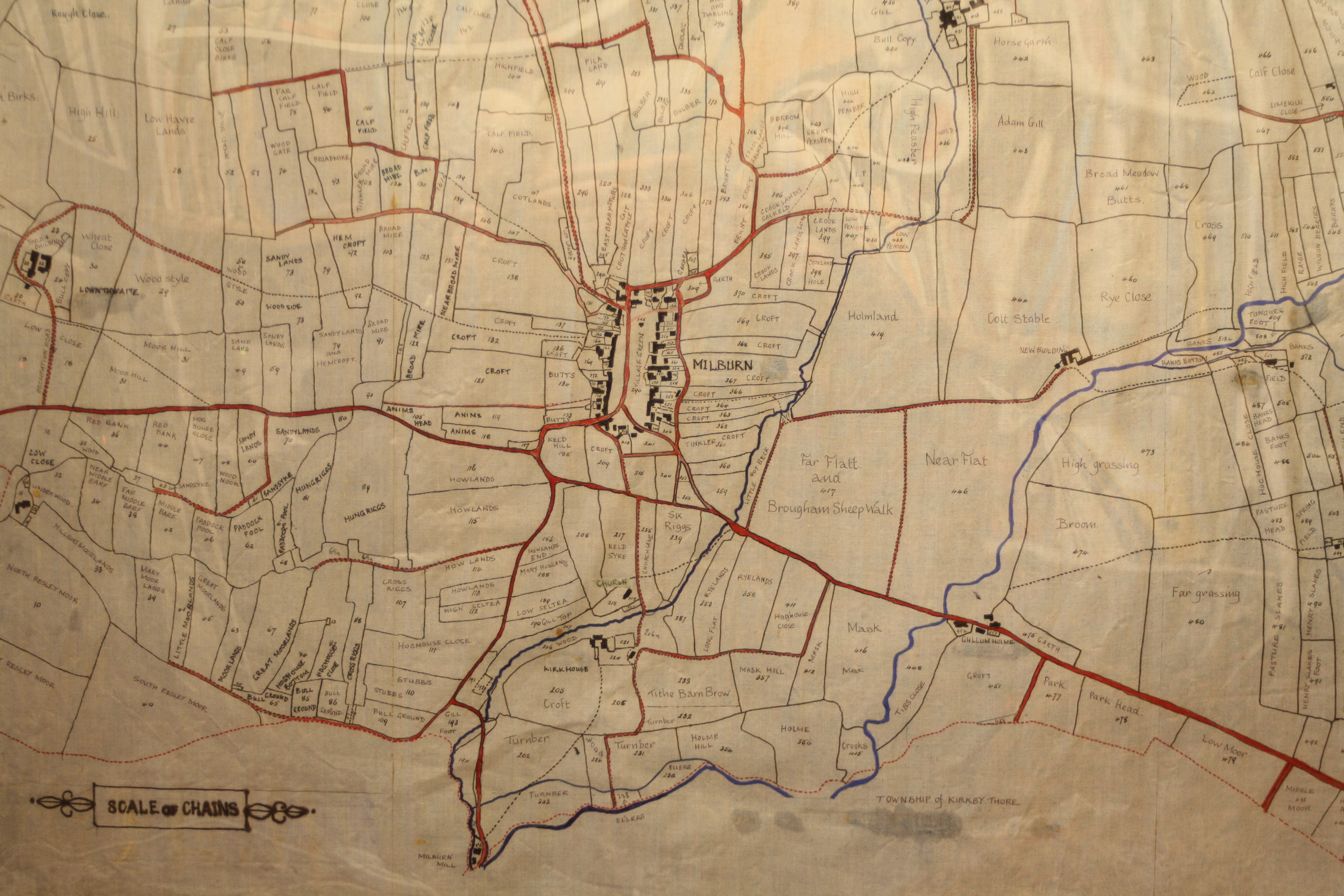
Milburn field names

The Ordnance Survey map shows the complex web of fields around the village, but it does not reveal that many of the fields have local names. Sometimes a name is simply those of the owner, but sometimes it says something about the nature of the ground or the use to which it has been put. The field names therefore represent a valuable repository of social history.

In the final year (2011) of its 60-year history, Milburn WI completed a large scale map recording these field names on a map of the parish from around 1800.

According to Butterworth, "ainims" means land taken into cultivation; "bulber" is bull hill; "haghill" is the clearing on the hill; "leaseds" is the pasture clearing; "mask hill" is marsh hill; "mell becks" is the land between the streams; "peaseber" is the peas hill; "pica land" is the pointed land; "raten mire" is the rat-infested bog; "thornber" is the thorn hill and "turnber" is the round hill.

=== Village school ===
The village school is situated at the northern end of the Green. According to Butterworth, there has been a school in the village since at least the 18th century and the present building was constructed in 1851 replacing an earlier, thatched one which was burnt down by one of the pupils in 1850. Originally it consisted of just one room designed to accommodate up to 55 pupils under the control of a single teacher. At this time children would generally stay at the school until they reached leaving age – by 1911 this was age 14.

Pupil numbers have varied widely over the years and during the 60s and 70s reached a low-point of 12. At this time the County Council had a policy of closing small schools and several attempts were made to close Milburn school. This was opposed by the village. In 2008, it had 37 pupils, a male head teacher, three part-time assistant teachers, and three part-time teaching assistants. In 2010, accommodation consisted of two classrooms, a school office, a food-preparation area and a modern toilet-block, all integrated into a single building.

=== Village hall ===
The village hall is a substantial sandstone building on the outskirts of the village to the south of the Green. It was erected by the parish council in 1912 at a cost of £300. Over the years it has benefited from numerous improvements and fills a variety of social needs both for the village and for the surrounding community. At one stage it housed a small library and reading room. In its early days the Hall was always referred to as "the Institute", or simply "the Insti". In the late 1940s children would have school dinners at the Institute.

In 2002 a grant from the National Lottery Community Fund permitted a major refurbishment. Modern heating and insulation were installed and these improvements have both reduced running costs and increased the attraction of the facilities.

=== Bus shelter ===
The bus shelter is a sandstone structure erected in 1953 to commemorate the Coronation of Queen Elizabeth II. It is roofed with slates salvaged from the derelict farmstead at Windy Hall. It was built by Arthur Craig.

=== Social events ===
The annual children's sports day and the village show are the survivors of the Milburn Gala. The first gala was held in 1887 and it persisted as an annual event until 1939 and the outbreak of the Second World War. In the past, the gala was an elaborate event involving a marquee for dancing, a flower show and races around the green. Cumberland Wrestling was a popular feature. The current Sports Day and Village Show are more modest events but continue to be well-supported.

There are Guy Fawkes celebrations on the green every 5 November, complete with hot-dogs, bonfire and fireworks.

== See also ==
- Listed buildings in Milburn, Cumbria
