= John Speed (martyr) =

English Roman Catholic layman and martyr

John Speed (alias Spence) (executed at Durham, 4 February 1594) was an English Roman Catholic layman, condemned for aiding and abetting Catholic priests in their ministry. He is a Catholic martyr, beatified by Pope Pius XI in 1929.

== History ==
Speed was one of a group of four known as "The Durham Martyrs of 1594". He was hanged at Durham 4 February 1594 for aiding and abetting priests, specifically for escorting John Boste from one safe house to another, which was a capital offense under the Jesuits, etc. Act 1584. Boste worked as a missionary priest in Northern England, and visited Hylton Castle, but his activities were largely centered around the old Neville estate at Brancepeth Castle near Durham. He was often accompanied by John Speed. With Speed's help, Boste was able to avoid arrest for over ten years but was eventually betrayed in 1593 to the authorities near Durham by an apostate informer. Just as he had finished saying Mass at a private house on the Neville estate, he and those with him were arrested.

According to Richard Challoner, Speed turned down the inducements offered to bring him to conformity with the Church of England. With him was condemned Grace Claxton, wife of William Claxton, of the Waterhouse, in the parish of Brancepeth, Durham, at whose house Boste was taken and probably Speed also. She was, however, reprieved on being found to be pregnant.

The others executed inn County Durham at that time were: John Boste (24 July), George Swallowell at Darlington 26 July, and John Ingram at Gateshead 26 July.
