= John Boste =

English Roman Catholic saint

Saint John Boste
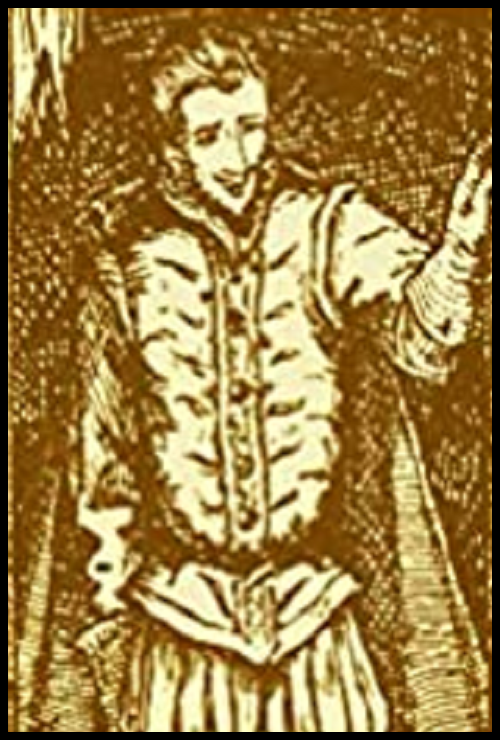
- From the cover of the book "The Life and Times of Saint John Boste: Catholic Martyr of Durham 1544 - 1594" by Simon Webb.

Priest and Martyr
- Born: c. 1544; Dufton, Westmorland, England
- Died: 24 July 1594 (aged 49 – 50); Durham, England
- Venerated in: Roman Catholic Church
- Beatified: 15 December 1929 by Pope Pius XI
- Canonized: 25 October 1970 by Pope Paul VI
- Feast: 4 May (all English Martyrs); 24 July (individual); 25 October (collectively with Forty Martyrs of England and Wales); 29 October (one of the Douai Martyrs)
- Attributes: crucifix

John Boste (c. 1544 – 24 July 1594) is a saint in the Catholic Church, and one of the Forty Martyrs of England and Wales.

== Life ==
John Boste was born in Dufton, Westmorland around 1544, the son of Nicholas Boste, landowner of Dufton and Penrith and Janet Hutton, of Hutton Hall, Penrith. He was educated at Appleby Grammar School and Queen's College, Oxford, where he took B.A. and M.A. degrees, and became a fellow of his college in 1572. Two years later he was back in Appleby, to become the first headmaster under the Charter of Queen Elizabeth. He converted to Catholicism in 1576. He left England and was ordained a priest at Reims in March 1581.

Boste returned to England in April 1581, landing in Hartlepool and made his way to East Anglia. Arriving in London, he posed as a servant a conforming Catholic household of Lord Montacute before returning north. He worked as a missionary priest in Northern England, often accompanied by John Speed. His activities were largely centered around Brancepeth Castle, owned by Lady Margaret Neville. He ran a clandestine operation out of South Shields, assisting candidates for the priesthood to get to the continent for training.

An effective missionary, the authorities were eager to capture him. In January 1584 the Privy Council ordered Lord Scrope, Warden of the Western March, to take energetic measures for his arrest. The house of Boste's brother Laurence was searched. Lord Huntingdon called Boste, "the great stag of the North".

Boste appears to have been in the vicinity of Carlisle in December and January, before going to Northumberland in early 1584. Boste evaded arrest for ten years but was betrayed to the authorities near Durham in 1593 by former Catholic Francis Egglesfield.

While leaving a clandestine Mass held at the Waterhouse on the Neville estate, Egglesfield asked the priest for a blessing. When Boste complied, this served as a signal to the militia observing nearby. As they stormed the Waterhouse, Boste was discovered in a priest hole behind the fireplace. Following his arrest he was taken to the Tower of London for interrogation on the rack by Richard Topcliffe. Returned to Durham he was condemned by the Assizes and hanged, drawn and quartered at nearby Dryburn on 24 July 1594. This is now the site of St. Leonard's school. Boste denied that he was a traitor saying "My function is to invade souls, not to meddle in temporal invasions". Boste recited the Angelus while mounting the ladder, and was executed with extraordinary brutality; for he was scarcely turned off the ladder when he was cut down, so that he stood on his feet semi-conscious, and in that posture was cruelly butchered. His limbs were hung on the castle walls, head displayed on a pole on Framwellgate Bridge, but removed that night by someone unknown.

== Veneration ==
John Boste was beatified by Pope Pius XI in 1929. He was canonized by Pope Paul VI in 1970 as one of the Forty Martyrs of England and Wales. Their joint feast day is kept on 4 May. His individual memorial is kept on the day of his execution, 24 July. He is also commemorated along with other Douai Martyrs on 29 October.

== See also ==
- Douai Martyrs
- Forty Martyrs of England and Wales
