= Coupland, Cumbria =

Village in England

Coordinates: 54.564°N 2.446°W

Coupland
- Village
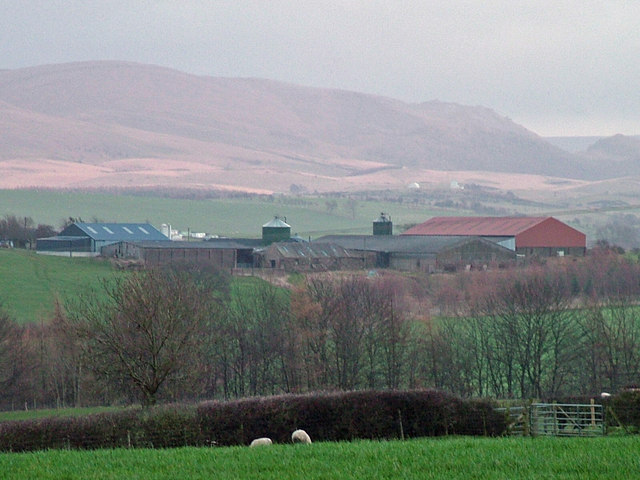
- Southfield Farm

- Location in the former Eden District Location within Cumbria
- OS grid reference: NY711188
- Civil parish: Warcop
- Unitary authority: Westmorland and Furness
- Ceremonial county: Cumbria
- Region: North West
- Country: England
- Sovereign state: United Kingdom
- Post town: APPLEBY-IN-WESTMORLAND
- Postcode district: CA16
- Dialling code: 017683
- Police: Cumbria
- Fire: Cumbria
- Ambulance: North West
- UK Parliament: Westmorland and Lonsdale

Coupland is a small village in Cumbria, England, in the civil parish of Warcop. It is situated a short distance to the south-east of Appleby-in-Westmorland, just to the north of the A66, and lies within the historic county boundaries of Westmorland.

The name 'coupland' may be a corruption of the surname coupman (cf. Kaupmann)

== Geography ==
Coupland Beck is a minor river that flows into the river Eden south of Coupland. Hilton Beck merges with Coupland Beck at the village of Coupland.

Coupland Beck Viaduct (also called Hilton Beck Viaduct) is a five arched, single track railway viaduct that carried the Eden Valley Railway over the stream, The preserved EVR hopes to aimfully restore the line across the viaduct towards Appleby someday.

== See also ==
- Listed buildings in Murton, Cumbria
