= Hilton, Cumbria =

Village in Cumbria, England

Hilton
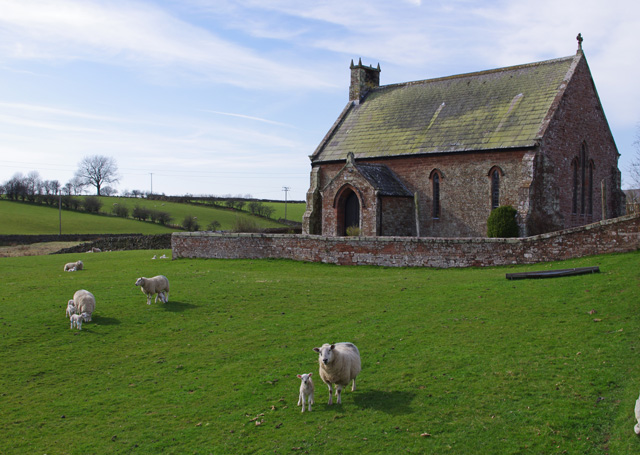
- St. John the Baptist Church, Hilton

- Location in Eden, Cumbria Location within Cumbria
- OS grid reference: NY731206
- Civil parish: Murton
- Unitary authority: Westmorland and Furness
- Ceremonial county: Cumbria
- Region: North West
- Country: England
- Sovereign state: United Kingdom
- Post town: APPLEBY-IN-WESTMORLAND
- Postcode district: CA16
- Dialling code: 017683
- UK Parliament: Westmorland and Lonsdale

Hilton is a village in Cumbria, England, in the civil parish of Murton, about 3 miles (4.8 km) east of Appleby-in-Westmorland and at an elevation of 752 feet (229 m). In 1870-72 the township had a population of 253. It has a rural economy, with much grazing of sheep, though the past was also home to lead mining.

== History ==
Hilton was the birthplace of Christopher Bainbridge (c.1464–1514), Cardinal and Archbishop of York (where he was the direct predecessor of Thomas Wolsey). Bainbridge was closely related to the local families of Langton, Machell and Blenkinsop.

By the end 19th century, Hilton had a population of around 300 in an area of 4,984 acres. There were many lead mines nearby and a smelt mill was situated in the village. In 1856 the St. John the Baptist Church was constructed in the area between Hilton and Murton which features a three-tier pulpit. Since the 1980s much of the previously common land of the village has been owned by the Ministry of Defence as part of the Warcop Training Area which has been expanded extensively over the years.

== Watercourses ==
Hilton Beck flows through the village. It combines water from Scordale, with its head at Hilton Fell, and Swindale, with its head at Burton Fell. Although the water quality is good on several measures, it is polluted with lead from former mining activities. Water from the beck powered a smelt mill at NY 736208 and a corn mill at NY 733208. The mill bridge across the beck is Grade II listed.

== Hilton Mine ==
Some two and a quarter miles (3.6 km) to the northeast of Hilton, between Hilton Fell and Murton Fell in Scordale, is the Hilton Mine 54°35′52″N 2°22′6″W. Initially it was worked for galena (lead ore) in the nineteenth century by the London Lead Company, it was later worked under different owners for barium minerals, barytes and witherite in the early twentieth century. It also was a rare source of yellow coloured fluorite in the UK.

== See also ==
- Listed buildings in Murton, Cumbria
