= High Cup Gill =

Valley deeply incised into the Pennine scarp in Cumbria, England

Coordinates: 54.623°N 2.407°W

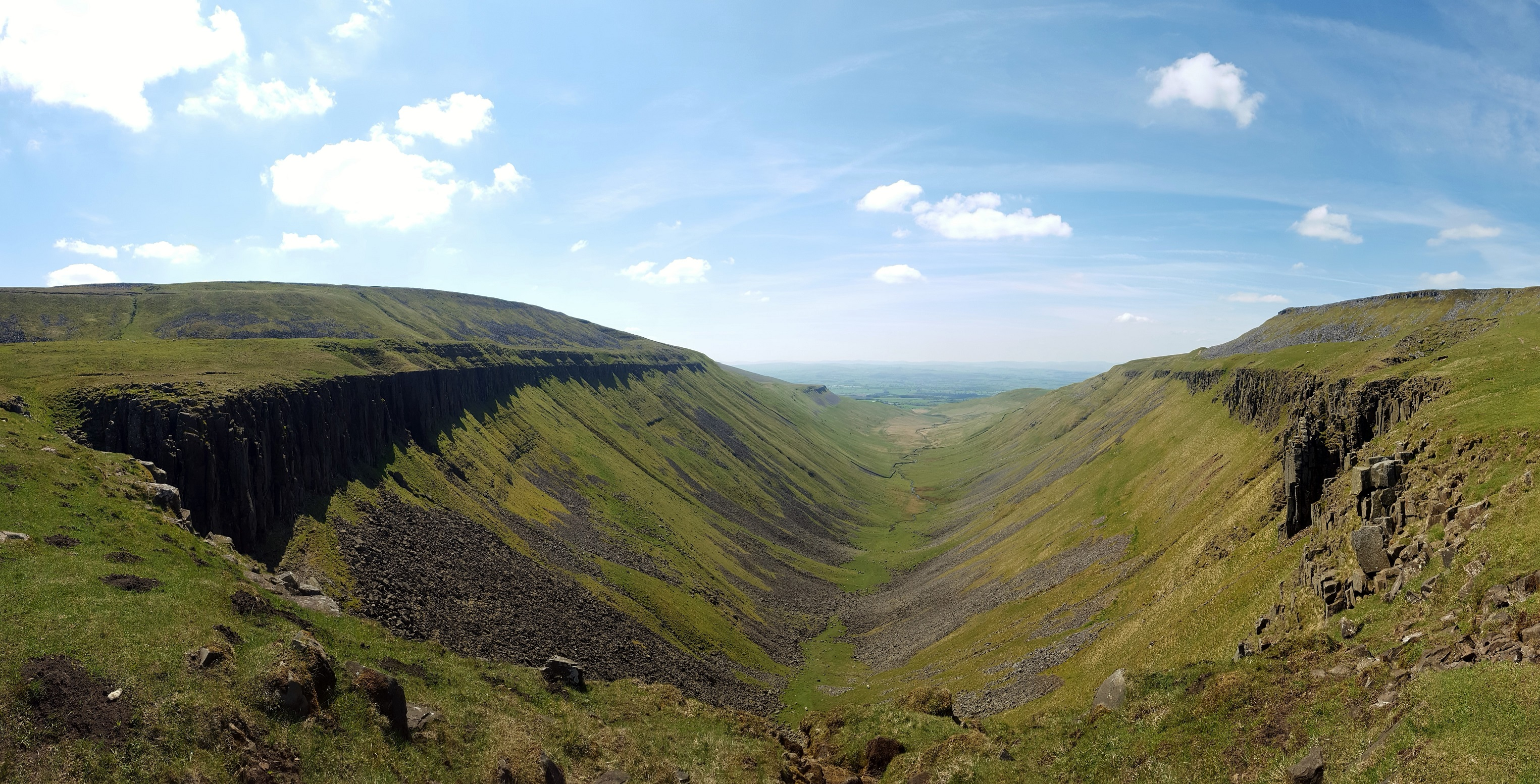
High Cup Gill on the Pennine Way

High Cup Gill (or High Cup Nick or just High Cup), almost a geometrically perfect U-shaped chasm, is a valley deeply incised into the Pennine scarp to the northeast of Appleby-in-Westmorland in Cumbria and within the North Pennines AONB in northern England. It is considered to be glacial in origin, ice having over-ridden the area during successive ice ages. To its southeast is Murton Fell and Dufton Fell is to the north.

== Toponym ==
The Ordnance Survey name the valley as High Cup Gill but it is often referred to by the name High Cup Nick, a name which properly refers in a more limited sense to the point at its northeastern limit where the headwaters of Highcup Gill Beck pass from the relatively flat terrain of High Cup Plain over the lip of High Cup Scar into the valley. 'Gill' is a word of Norse origin meaning narrow valley or ravine whilst 'beck' signifies a stream; both occur widely in the hills of northern England. As seen in the classic view southwest over the valley into the Vale of Eden from its head at High Cup Nick, it is considered one of the finest natural features in northern England.

== Geology and geography ==
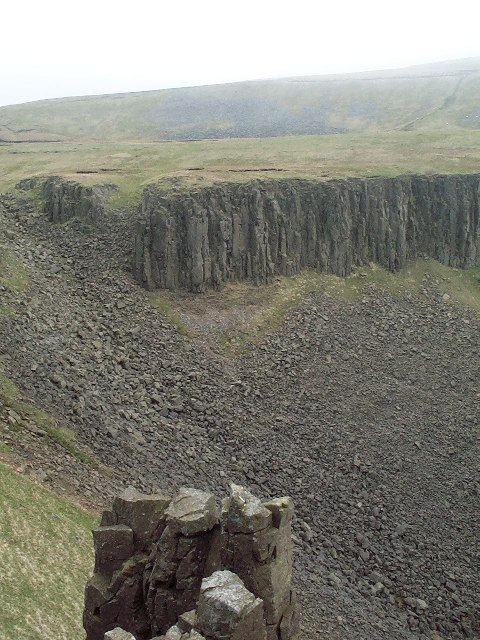
The glacially formed cliffs around High Cup Nick

High Cup Scar is formed by a near-horizontal outcrop of the Whin Sill, a dolerite intrusion of late Carboniferous age which underlies much of the North Pennines and northeast England. Tumbled blocks of this rock are scattered down the scree slopes beneath the scar. A notable pinnacle of this rock on the northern side of the valley is known as Nichol or Nichol's Chair after a local cobbler who, for a bet, practised his craft perched on its summit. The country rock into which the sill is intruded is the Alston Formation, a part of the Yoredale Group of multiple layers of limestones, sandstones, siltstones and mudstones. At the base of the gill, though largely obscured by the dolerite blocks, are older rocks: the sedimentary rocks of the Ravenstonedale Group and, beneath them, the metamorphosed slates and sandstones of the Skiddaw Group which date from the Ordovician period.

Drainage is via the Burthwaite Beck which flows from High Cup Nick, south west through the gill, to eventually join the River Eden at Kirkby Thore. On ordnance survey maps, the name of the watercourse changes from High Cupgill Beck in the gill, to various names reflecting the nearest settlement it is passing, including Burthwaite, on its way to the Eden. High Cup Nick is immediately southwest of the watershed with the Maize Beck tributary of the River Tees, therefore representing a boundary between the Eden (west coast) and Tees (east coast) catchments.

== Pennine feature ==
The Pennine Way skirts the valley on its northern side by a traditional route known as Narrow Gate as it runs from Forest in Teesdale west via Cauldron Snout and Maize Beck to Dufton. This national trail briefly splits into two separate routes on either bank of Maize Beck; it is the southerly of the two which leads via High Cup Nick. Listed in the 100 best Pathfinder walks in Britain, High Cup Nick has been described as a difficult walk of 8 miles (13 km), with an elevation of 1,445 feet (440 m). The famous fellwalker Alfred Wainwright describes High Cup as "a great moment on the journey" in his book Pennine Way Companion.

The village of Dufton lies between two of the most challenging sections of the Pennine Way. There are precipitous drops along the higher sections of the walk and the Helm Wind blowing through the valley can be very strong. The whole of the valley is within an area mapped as open country under the Countryside and Rights of Way Act 2000, hence there is a general right for walkers to roam at will. This section of the Pennine Way is a bridleway, and is therefore legally available to cyclists and horseriders too.

== Sources ==
- Ordnance Survey (27 September 2018). 100 Outstanding British Walks. United Kingdom: Ordnance Survey. ISBN 9780319090862.
