= Murton, Cumbria =

Village in Cumbria, England

Coordinates: 54°35′24″N 2°24′40″W

Murton
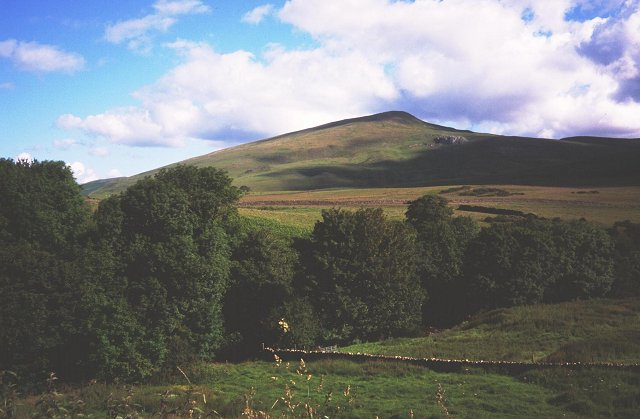
- Murton Pike

- Location within Cumbria
- Population: 360 (2011)
- OS grid reference: NY7221
- Civil parish: Murton
- Unitary authority: Westmorland and Furness
- Ceremonial county: Cumbria
- Region: North West
- Country: England
- Sovereign state: United Kingdom
- Post town: APPLEBY IN WESTMORLAND
- Postcode district: CA16
- Dialling code: 01768
- Police: Cumbria
- Fire: Cumbria
- Ambulance: North West
- UK Parliament: Westmorland and Lonsdale

Murton is a small village and civil parish in Westmorland and Furness, Cumbria, England. The parish had a population of 330 in 2001, rising to 360 at the 2011 Census. Settlements within the parish include the villages of Hilton, Langton, and Brackenber as well as various small farms, houses and cottages. The town of Appleby-in-Westmorland is to the south-west.

== Geography ==
Murton is located 200 yards (180 m) west of the foot of Murton Pike. The village covers an area of roughly 17 acres (6.88 ha). A small stream known as Murton Beck runs through the village and down Murton Gill (a small woodland on the west side of the village). The stream continues west through Flakebridge wood before joining up with Keisley Beck. A 1/2 mile (0.80 km) south of Murton lies Hilton village and the streams of Hilton Beck and Stannerstones Sike. One mile (1.6 km) to the east is Brackenber, which lies west of George Gill and Lycum Sike.

Murton Pike, to the west of Murton village, is 594 metres (1,949 ft) high and a triangulation point, it is a south-westerly outlier of Murton Fell, which rises to over 670 metres (2,200 ft) at two points. Parts of Murton Fell lie within the British Army's Warcop Training Area. South of Murton Pike lies Mickle Fell and Roman Fell, both of which are also part of the Warcop Training Area.

== History ==
The settlement of Murton is hundreds of years old, dating from at least the 1300s. Joan Blaeu’s 1646 map, "Westmorlandia Comitatvs Anglice Westmorland", mentions a village by the name of "Morton" in the present area of Murton; a "Morton Pike" is also marked on the map. Christopher Saxton’s 1579 map marks "Morton" as well as a village known as "Helton" (probably referring to Hilton) and "Lanton". Murton Hall (marked as "Morton Hall" on past maps) is a grade II-listed 14th-century building located in the heart of Murton. It is believed that Murton Hall was one of, if not the first, settlement or building in Murton. Murton had around 200 inhabitants at the turn of the 19th century.

== See also ==
- Listed buildings in Murton, Cumbria
