= Dufton =

Village and civil parish in Cumbria, England

Coordinates: 54.62016°N 2.4820°W

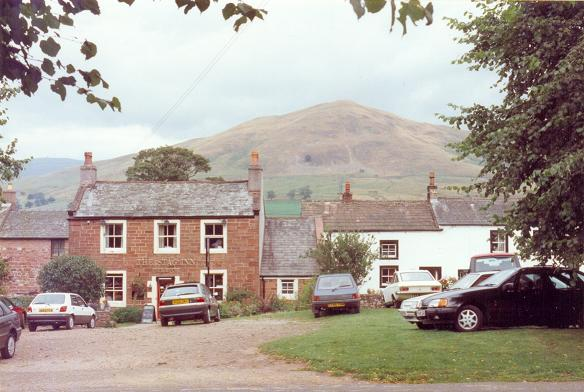
- Dufton in 1996, Dufton Pike in the background

- Location within Cumbria
- Population: 209 (2021)
- OS grid reference: NY6825
- Civil parish: Dufton
- Unitary authority: Westmorland and Furness
- Ceremonial county: Cumbria
- Region: North West
- Country: England
- Sovereign state: United Kingdom
- Post town: APPLEBY–IN–WESTMORLAND
- Postcode district: CA16
- Dialling code: 01768
- Police: Cumbria
- Fire: Cumbria
- Ambulance: North West
- UK Parliament: Westmorland and Lonsdale

Dufton is a village and civil parish in Cumbria, England. Historically part of Westmorland, it lies in the Eden Valley and below Great Dun Fell. It is mostly around 180m above sea level. At the 2001 census, the parish had a population of 201, increasing to 204 at the 2011 census.

The centre of the village is built around a green, on the north side of which is the Stag Inn. The village green is oblong in shape and is bisected by an avenue of lime trees that crosses it diagonally. Houses in the village were built from the 17th century onwards and the village has changed little over the last 100 years.

== History ==
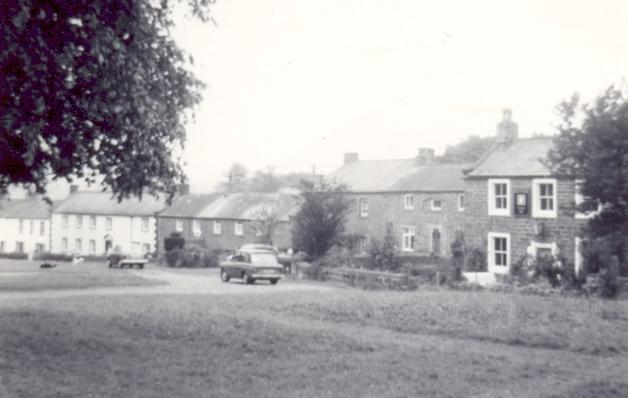
Dufton village in 1968, the hills behind invisible in the mist

Dufton is an ancient settlement and some of the earliest written records of the village are from the 1320s. The place-name Dufton is first attested in 1289 and means 'dove town or farmstead'. The Rolls of Appointment report the "living" of the parish of Dufton in 1323.

St Cuthbert's Church just outside the village mainly dates from the 19th century.

Dufton was a centre for lead mining in the 18th and 19th centuries. The Quaker-owned London Lead Company developed the village through the construction of housing, a school, a library and the installation of piped water. A fountain and circular water trough built by the Company forms a centrepiece on the green. The inscription on the fountain reads (translated from the Latin):

There is a clear pool, whose waters gleam like silver. It is not tainted by shepherds, or by their she-goats grazing on the mountain. Nor is it muddied by cattle, or by birds or wild animals, or by a branch fallen from a tree.

== Dufton today ==
The main activities in the village nowadays are linked to tourism and farming. Dufton was badly affected by the foot and mouth disease outbreak of 2001. Local farms were in the area which became known as "the Penrith spur" where the disease proved very hard to eradicate and where the final cases of the outbreak occurred. The practice of grazing sheep on communal pastureland above the village may have contributed to this.

Dufton lies on the Pennine Way and both the Stag Inn and Dufton Youth Hostel are favourite stopping-off points for walkers. The Hostel was opened in 1978 following the closure of nearby Knock YHA which was located in an old RAF station. There are several B&Bs and campsites in and around the village.

Dufton Ghyll Wood is an area of semi-natural ancient woodland that contains significant outcrops of St Bees Sandstone. Other local geographic features include Dufton Pike, Knock Pike, Cross Fell and High Cup Gill. The locality is also known for the Helm Wind and Helm Bar. The latter are wind and cloud effects induced by the topography of the area.

== See also ==
- Listed buildings in Dufton
