= Orton =

Orton may refer to:

== Places ==
=== England ===
- Orton, Peterborough, Cambridgeshire
- Orton, Cumberland, Cumbria, a civil parish near Carlisle
- Orton, Westmorland and Furness, Cumbria, a village and civil parish near Tebay
- Orton, Northamptonshire, a village and civil parish
- Orton, Staffordshire, a hamlet

=== Elsewhere ===
- Orton Cave, Ardery Island, Antarctica
- Orton Island, Queensland, Australia
- Orton, Alberta, Canada, a hamlet
- Orton, Ontario, Canada, a small community
- Orton, Moray, Scotland, a hamlet, OS grid ref NJ3152
- Orton, West Virginia, United States, an unincorporated community
- Orton Park, Madison, Wisconsin, United States, a park on the National Register of Historic Places

== People ==
- Orton (surname)
- Orton Chirwa (1919–1992), Malawian lawyer and politician, Malawi's Minister of Justice and Attorney General
- Orton Grain (1863—1930), Canadian physician and politician
- Randy Orton, professional wrestler (nicknamed Orton)

== Other uses ==
- Orton (photography), a photography technique
- Orton Ceramic Foundation

== See also ==
- Great Orton, Cumbria (near Carlisle)
- Little Orton, Cumbria (near Carlisle)
- Orton on the Hill, Leicestershire, England, a village
- Orton Plantation, a plantation house on the US National Register of Historic Places
- Water Orton, Warwickshire
- Oreton (disambiguation)
