= Orton, Cumberland =

Civil parish in Cumbria, England

Coordinates: 54.876508°N 3.0311108°W

Orton
- Civil parish
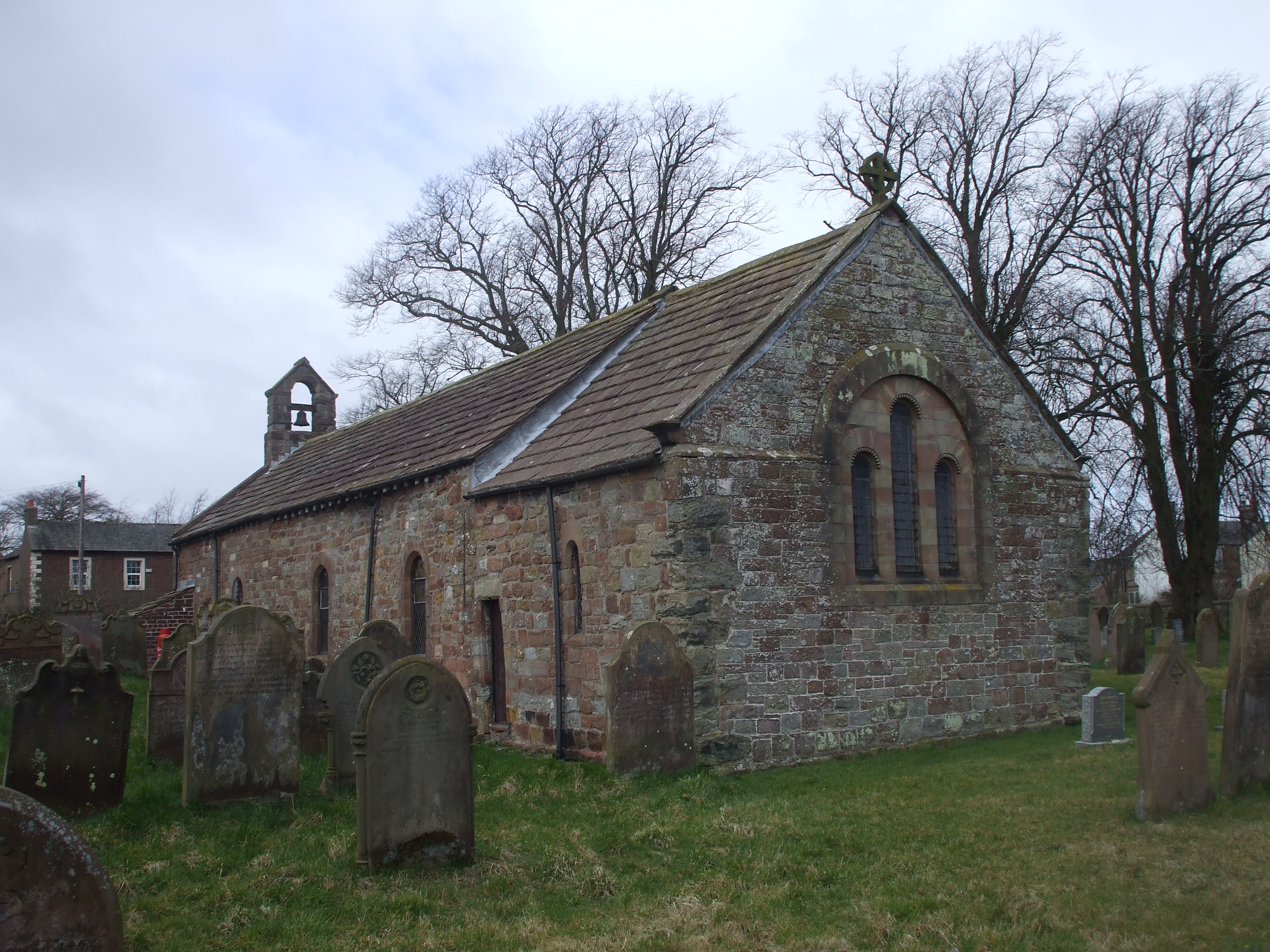
- St. Giles' Church, Great Orton

- Location within Cumbria
- Area: 17.35 km^{2} (6.70 sq mi)
- Population: 486 (2021)
  - Density: 28/km^{2} (73/sq mi)
- Civil parish: Orton
- Unitary authority: Cumberland
- Ceremonial county: Cumbria
- Region: North West
- Country: England
- Sovereign state: United Kingdom
- Post town: CARLISLE
- Postcode district: CA5
- Dialling code: 01228
- Police: Cumbria
- Fire: Cumbria
- Ambulance: North West
- UK Parliament: Carlisle
- Website: https://ortonpc-carlisle.org.uk/

Orton is a civil parish in the Cumberland district, in the ceremonial county of Cumbria, England. The parish includes the settlements of Baldwinholme, Great Orton, Little Orton, Orton Rigg and Woodhouses. It overlaps the eastern edge of the former RAF Great Orton airfield. In 2021 the parish had a population of 486. The parish touches Aikton, Beaumont, Burgh By Sands, Cummersdale, Dalston, Kirkbampton and Thursby. There are 12 listed buildings in Orton, and the parish includes Orton Moss, which is a Site of Special Scientific Interest.

== History ==
The name "Orton" may mean 'Orri's farm/settlement' or 'black grouse farm/settlement'. The parish included the townships of Great Orton and Baldwinholme. Until 1974 it was in Cumberland from 1974 to 2023 it was in Carlisle district.

== See also ==
- Listed buildings in Orton, Cumberland
