= Milefortlet 2 =

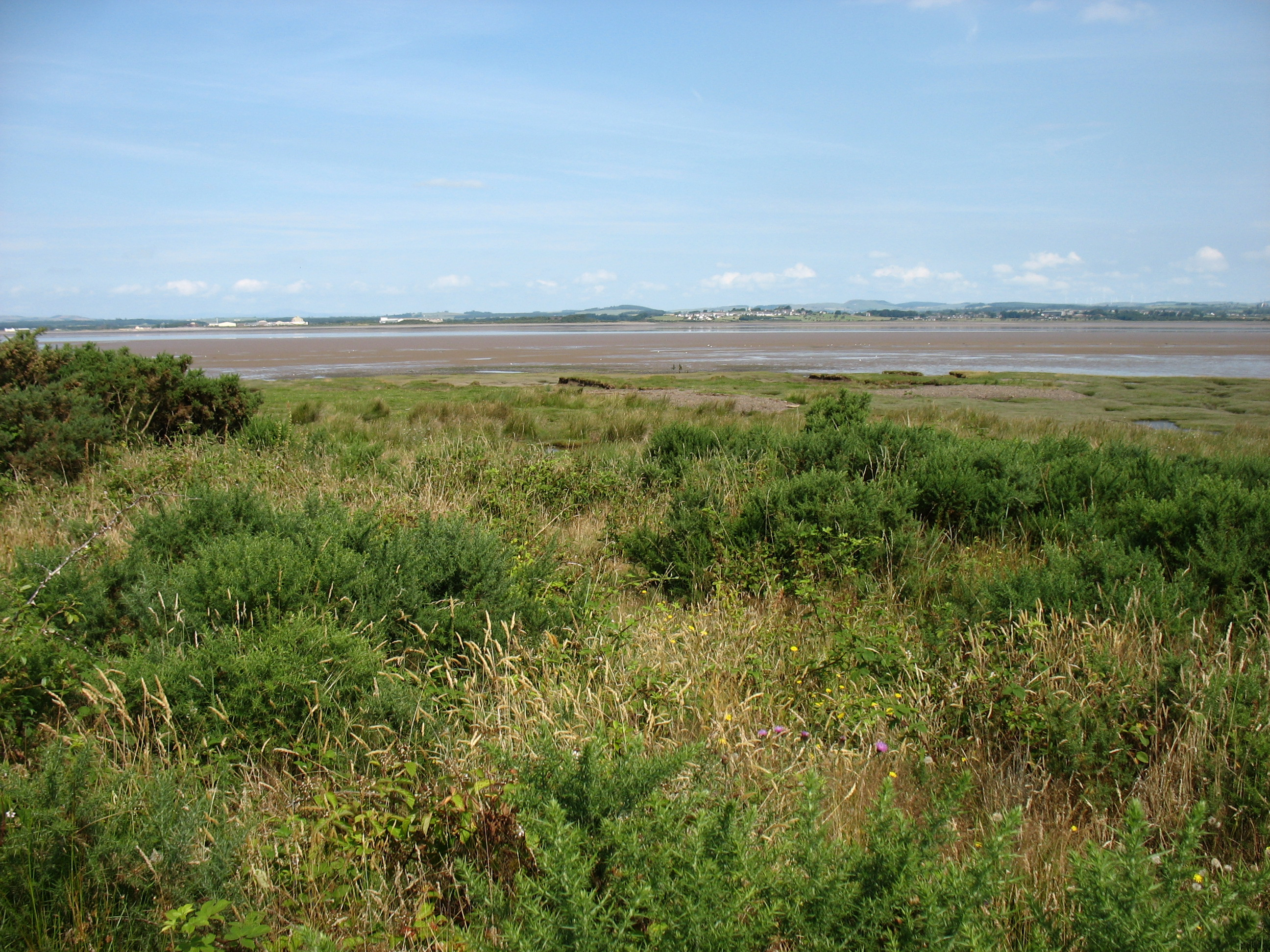
- View over the Solway Firth at Scargavel Point, near the site of Milefortlet 2

- Location within Cumbria
- 54.941232°N 3.25422°W
- Type: Milecastle
- Location: Cumbria, England

Milefortlet 2 was a Milefortlet of the Roman Cumbrian Coast defences. These milefortlets and intervening stone watchtowers extended from the western end of Hadrian's Wall, along the Cumbrian coast and were linked by a wooden palisade. They were contemporary with defensive structures on Hadrian's Wall. The exact location of Milefortlet 2 is unknown, although one of the nearby turrets (Tower 2B) has been located and excavated.

== Description ==
Milefortlet 2 was situated somewhere on the coast near Scargavel Point in the civil parish of Bowness. The milefortlet has never been located, but its position has been estimated from the known positions of Milefortlet 1 and Milefortlet 3. The likeliest position for the fort is under the buildings of North Plain farm (grid reference NY19776148) which stands on a slight ridge with good views to the sea. An alternative location is out on the salt marsh (grid reference NY19436165).

== Associated Towers ==
Each milefortlet had two associated towers, similar in construction to the turrets built along Hadrian's Wall. These towers were positioned approximately one-third and two-thirds of a Roman mile to the west of the Milefortlet, and would probably have been manned by part of the nearest Milefortlet's garrison. The towers associated with Milefortlet 2 are known as Tower 2A (grid reference NY194611) and Tower 2B (grid reference NY19036078).

The site of Tower 2A is uncertain, and it has never been located. The site of Tower 2B has been located and it is clearly visible on aerial photographs. Tower 2B was excavated by in 1993, and initial investigations indicated that there had been two timber phases followed by rebuilding in stone. Since then, the evidence for the timber phases has been dismissed, and the stone tower is the only phase which has been confirmed.
