= Biglands =

Hamlet in Cumbria, England

Coordinates: 54.867°N 3.161°W

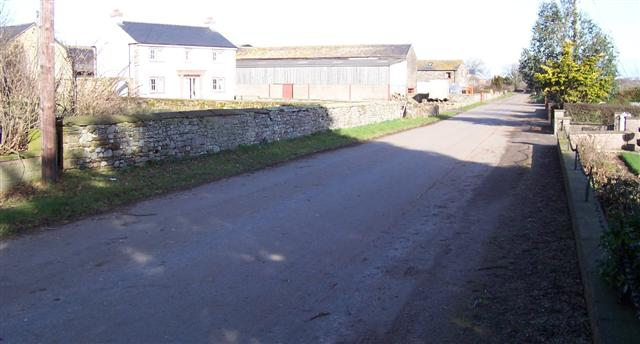
- Biglands

- Location in Allerdale, Cumbria Location within Cumbria
- OS grid reference: NY254530
- Civil parish: Aikton
- Unitary authority: Cumberland
- Ceremonial county: Cumbria
- Region: North West
- Country: England
- Sovereign state: United Kingdom
- Post town: WIGTON
- Postcode district: CA7
- Dialling code: 016973
- Police: Cumbria
- Fire: Cumbria
- Ambulance: North West
- UK Parliament: Penrith and Solway

Biglands is a hamlet in Cumbria, England. It is located to the north of Gamelsby, and east of the River Wampool.

It is not the location of Milefortlet 1, the first milefortlet to the west of Hadrian's Wall, which is located on the coast overlooking the Solway Firth at Biglands House Farm, about a mile to the west of Bowness-on-Solway and just to the south of Herdhill Scar. The confusion is caused by the proximity and similarity of names.

A school was once located at Biglands, but it closed and was incorporated with Wiggonby school in 1959.

== See also ==
- List of places in Cumbria
