= Orton Rigg =

Hamlet in Cumbria, England

Coordinates: 54.862°N 3.047°W

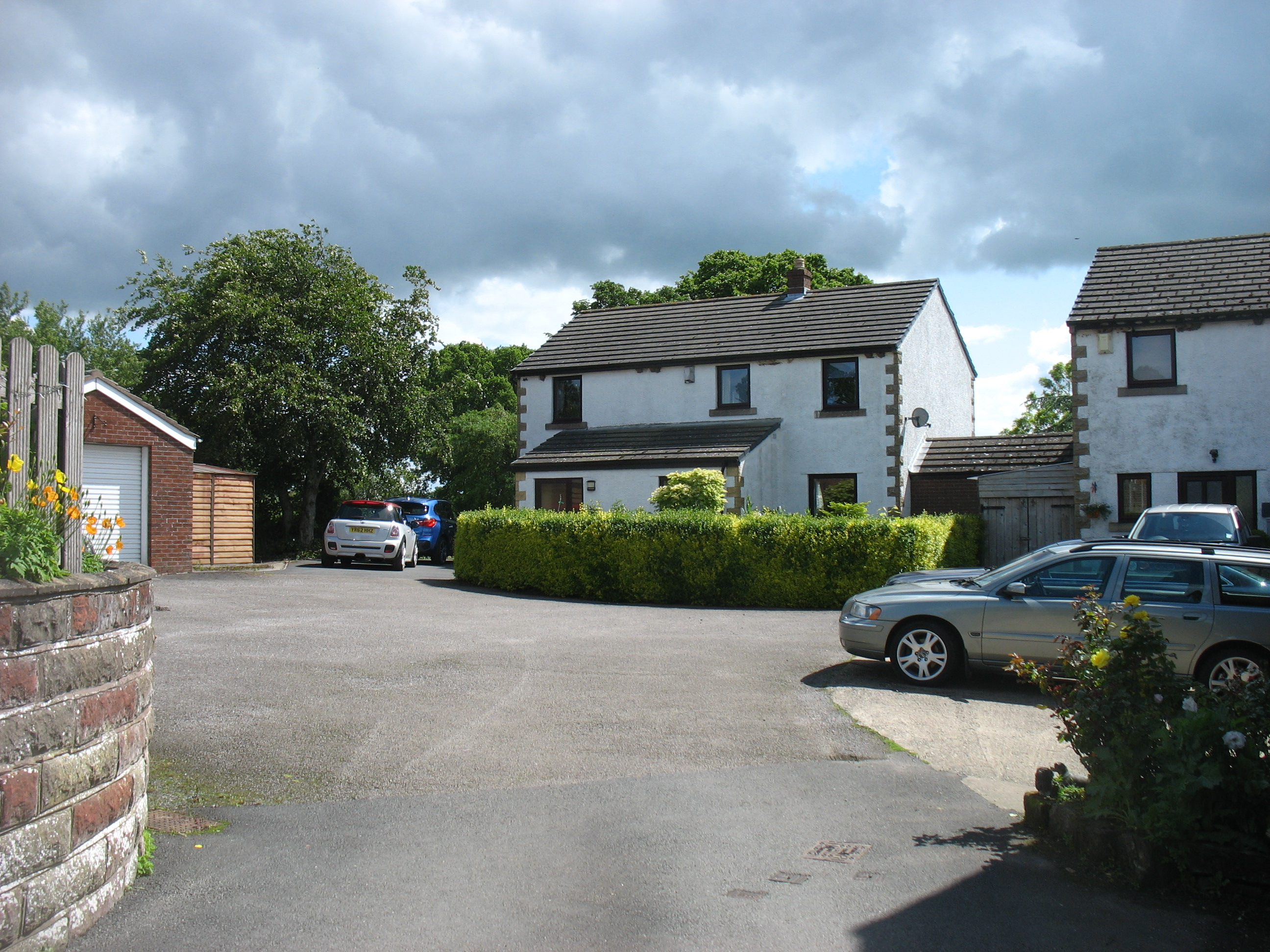

- Location in the former Carlisle district Location within Cumbria
- OS grid reference: NY328524
- Civil parish: Orton
- Unitary authority: Cumberland
- Ceremonial county: Cumbria
- Region: North West
- Country: England
- Sovereign state: United Kingdom
- Post town: CARLISLE
- Postcode district: CA5
- Dialling code: 01228
- Police: Cumbria
- Fire: Cumbria
- Ambulance: North West
- UK Parliament: Carlisle

Orton Rigg is a hamlet in the civil parish of Orton, in the Cumberland district of Cumbria, England.

== Location ==
The hamlet is located south-west of the city of Carlisle and north of the village of Thursby. Other nearby settlements include the village of Great Orton and the hamlets of Little Orton, Baldwinholme, Nealhouse and Cardewless.

== Transport ==
For transport there is the B5307 road, the A595 road, and the A596 road nearby. There is also the Carlisle railway station, which is on the Settle-Carlisle Line.
