= Listed buildings in Aikton =

Aikton is a civil parish in the Cumberland district in Cumbria, England. It contains nine buildings that are recorded in the National Heritage List for England as designated listed buildings. Of these, one is listed at Grade I, the highest of the three grades, and the others are at Grade II, the lowest grade. The parish contains the village of Aikton and is otherwise almost completely rural. Apart from a church, the listed buildings are houses and associated structures, or farmhouses and farm buildings.

== Key ==
Grade	Criteria
I	Buildings of exceptional interest, sometimes considered to be internationally important
II	Buildings of national importance and special interest

== Buildings ==
Name and location	Photograph	Date	Notes	Grade
St Andrew's Church; 54.86533°N 3.11936°W		12th century	The church was originally built with cobbles set in clay. Most of it was rebuilt in sandstone in 1732, some of the stone being taken from Hadrian's Wall; the side walls were rebuilt in 1869. The chancel roof is in slate, elsewhere the roofs are in sandstone slate. The church consists of a nave, a south aisle, a chancel, and a north vestry. On the west gable is a double bellcote.	I
Down Hall Farmhouse; 54.86221°N 3.11854°W	—	Late 17th century	The front of the farmhouse is in brick on a chamfered plinth with quoins, the rear wall is in render over clay, the extension is in sandstone, and the roof is in green slate. The house has two storeys and three bays, with a single-bay extension to the right. The windows are sashes; the windows and doorway have architraves.	II
The Cottage; 54.90341°N 3.18513°W	—	Late 17th century	The house was extended in the 19th century. The original part is in clay with sandstone repairs and has a corrugated iron roof, and has one storey with an attic. The extension is in sandstone with a Welsh slate roof, in two storeys and two bays. There is one sash window, the other windows being casements.	II
Down Hall Farmhouse; 54.86212°N 3.11926°W	—	Late 18th century	The farmhouse is rendered with a chamfered plinth, quoins, and a cornice. It has two storeys and four bays, the left bay probably an extension. The doorway has a Tuscan doorcase with a radial fanlight and an open pediment. There is a;so a 20th-century doorway with an architrave to the left. All but one of the windows are sashes with architraves.	II
Aikton House; 54.87275°N 3.13372°W	—	Early 19th century	A farmhouse in calciferous sandstone with a slate roof, in two storeys and three bays. The central doorway has a fanlight and an Ionic doorcase. The windows are sashes.	II
Bragg's House and barn 54.86714°N 3.13256°W	—	Early 19th century	A brick farmhouse on a stone plinth with quoins and a Welsh slate roof. It has two storeys and three bays. The central doorway has a pilastered surround and a radial fanlight, and the windows are sashes with architraves. The brick barn to the right also has two storeys but is lower. It has a green slate roof, casement windows and ventilation slits.	II
Wall east of Bragg's House; 54.86711°N 3.13239°W	—	Early 19th century	The stone wall in front of the house is low with cast iron railings and a gate. It continues at a higher level with saddleback coping, curving to form an entrance to the farmyard. Two 17th-century cannons are used as bollards.	II
The Rectory (Aikton Hall); 54.86548°N 3.12110°W		1828	A house in calciferous sandstone with quoins and a green slate roof, in two storeys and with three bays. The central doorway has an Ionic doorcase with an inscription above. In the ground floor are canted bay windows, and above the windows are sashes.	II
Watch Office, former RAF Great Orton; 54.87778°N 3.08056°W		1943	The control tower is in brick, with a reinforced concrete roof surfaced in asphalt. There are two storeys and a rectangular plan, a single-storey switch room, and a porch. The windows are Crittall Windows in galvanised steel, some of them large observation windows, with three casements.	II
