= Wiggonby =

Hamlet in Cumbria, England

Coordinates: 54.867°N 3.097°W

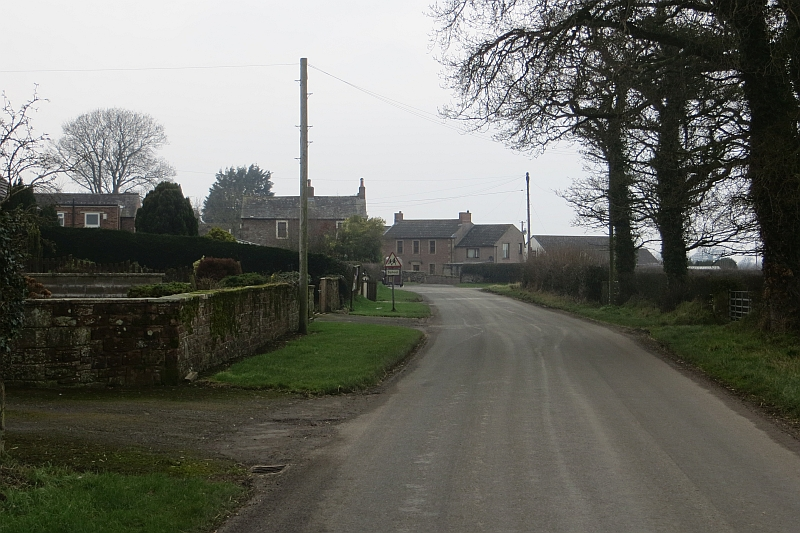
- Wiggonby

- Location in Allerdale, Cumbria Location within Cumbria
- OS grid reference: NY296530
- Civil parish: Aikton
- Unitary authority: Cumberland
- Ceremonial county: Cumbria
- Region: North West
- Country: England
- Sovereign state: United Kingdom
- Post town: WIGTON
- Postcode district: CA7
- Dialling code: 016973
- Police: Cumbria
- Fire: Cumbria
- Ambulance: North West
- UK Parliament: Penrith and Solway

Wiggonby is a hamlet in parish of Aikton and the district of Cumberland, in the English county of Cumbria. Historically in Cumberland, it seven miles away from the city of Carlisle and 2 1/4 miles from the village of Great Orton. The village has an area of 2,404 acres. It has a primary school called Wiggonby CE School, which currently has 48 pupils.

== History ==
The village school was founded in 1792 and rebuilt in 1860. Circa 1870, it had a population of 298 as recorded in the Imperial Gazetteer of England and Wales. The village was the site of RAF Great Orton, also known as Wiggonby airfield during World War II. It was opened in June 1943 as a satellite of RAF Silloth, it closed in August 1952. The site of the airfield was also used to bury nearly half a million animal carcasses in the 2001 United Kingdom foot-and-mouth outbreak.
