= Aikton =

Village in Cumbria, England

Coordinates: 54°52′14″N 3°07′55″W

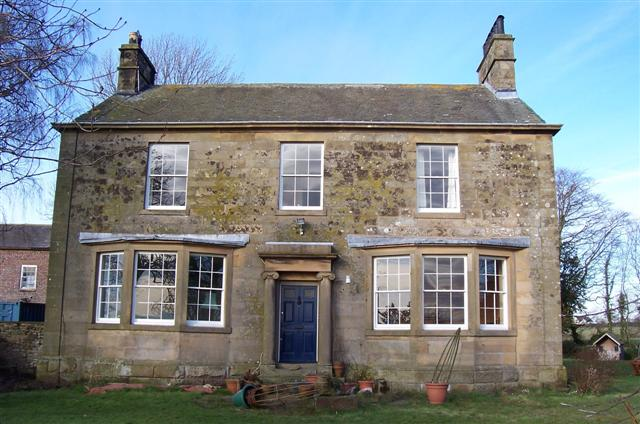
- The Rectory, Aikton

- Location within Cumbria
- Area: 2.86 sq mi (7.4 km^{2})
- Population: 467 (2011)
  - Density: 163/sq mi (63/km^{2})
- OS grid reference: NY273534
- Civil parish: Aikton
- Unitary authority: Cumberland
- Ceremonial county: Cumbria
- Region: North West
- Country: England
- Sovereign state: United Kingdom
- Post town: WIGTON
- Postcode district: CA7
- Dialling code: 016973
- Police: Cumbria
- Fire: Cumbria
- Ambulance: North West
- UK Parliament: Penrith and Solway
- Website: Official website

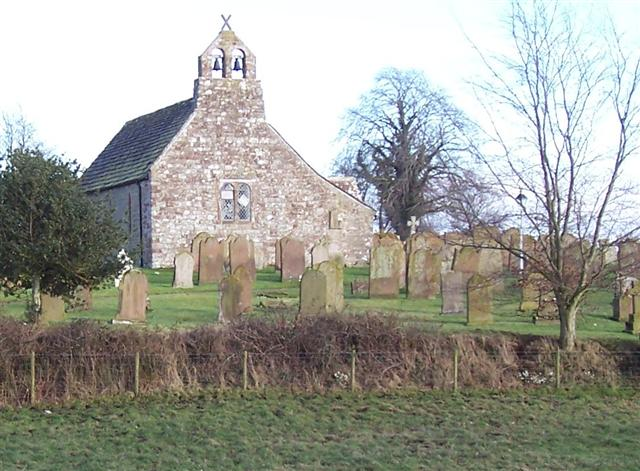
St. Andrew's, Aikton

Aikton is a small village in the north of the English county of Cumbria. The nearest town is Wigton 3 miles away, and the nearest city is Carlisle at 8 miles. Aikton is located 5 1/2 miles (8.9 km) south of the Scottish border, measured from the centre of the Channel of the River Eden. It is in the historic county of Cumberland.

There is a pub, phonebox and postbox; but no shops. The local church, St Andrew's, is over 900 years old, and is one of the oldest in the region. Pevsner says that it has a "solid C12 w[est] front" and gives details of Norman and Early English Period work on the church."

The village pub, the 'Aikton Arms', was constructed in the 18th century and is also used as a Bed and Breakfast facility. Many houses in Aikton have views of the Lake District. The surrounding area is almost entirely farmland, containing cows usually.

== Toponymy ==
'Aikton' "is OScand[inavian] 'eiki-tūn' or 'eik-tūn', 'oak tūn'. So, the meaning is probably 'oak-tree hamlet'. ('OScand' is most likely to be Old Norse).

== Parish ==
Aikton is a parish, which was formerly an ancient parish in the county of Cumberland.It is five miles in length (from north to south) and two miles in breadth with an area of 6,156 acres – 1,829 of which was the village itself. This parish also includes the villages or hamlets of Biglands, Gamelsby, Wampool and Wiggonby. Until the 16th century the area was terrorised by border raiders, and the land formed one (demesne) of the two manors owned by the Burgh Barony, down to the death of Hugh de Morville in 1202. Most of the site of RAF Great Orton is within the parish, the area now designated as Watchtree Nature Reserve.

== See also ==
- Listed buildings in Aikton
