= Oreton =

Oreton may refer to:

- Oreton, Ohio, USA
- Oreton, Shropshire, England
- Oreton, a brand name of methyltestosterone

== See also ==
- Orton (disambiguation)
