= Listed buildings in Orton, Cumberland =

Orton is a civil parish in the Cumberland district of Cumbria, England. It contains twelve listed buildings that are recorded in the National Heritage List for England. Of these, one is listed at Grade II*, the middle of the three grades, and the others are at Grade II, the lowest grade. The parish contains the village of Great Orton, and the smaller settlements of Little Orton and Baldwinholme, and is otherwise rural. The listed buildings consist of farmhouses, farm buildings, houses and associated structures, a church, and a war memorial in the churchyard.

== Key ==
Grade	Criteria
II*	Particularly important buildings of more than special interest
II	Buildings of national importance and special interest

== Buildings ==
Name and location	Photograph	Date	Notes	Grade
St Giles' Church; 54.87880°N 3.04740°W		12th century	A Norman church that was extended towards the west in the 17th century and restored in 1886. It is in sandstone, largely from the Roman Wall, and has a roof of sandstone slate with coped gables and cross finials. The church consists of a nave with a 19th-century wooden north porch, and a chancel. On the west gable is an open bellcote. The windows on the sides are round-headed, and the east window is a triple lancet.	II*
The Farm, outbuildings and garden wall 54.85758°N 3.03320°W	—	c. 1575	A cruck-framed farmhouse with rendered clay wall and a thatched roof. It has been extended into a north outbuilding, and with its south outbuilding it forms an L-shaped plan. There is a single storey with a loft, and five bays. The date has been determined by dendrochronology. In front of the house is a low rubble garden wall with chamfered ashlar coping.	II
Sparrow Rigg Cottage; 54.85835°N 3.05439°W	—	Late 17th or early 18th century	The cottage has rendered clay walls a plinth of stone a cobble, sandstone dressings, and a Welsh slate roof. Originally in a single storey, it has been raised to 1 1/2 storeys. On the front are four rectangular windows of differing sizes, with timber lintels and stone sills, and at the rear is a single window with sandstone jambs and sill.	II
High Bow Farmhouse and barn 54.89576°N 3.03813°W	—	18th century or earlier	The barn is older than the farmhouse, which dates from the early 19th century; both have Welsh slate roofs. The house is in brick, and has two storeys and three bays. On the front is a prostyle Ionic porch. The windows are sashes with segmental brick arches and keystones. The long barn to the right is in clay, the end wall is rebuilt in brick, and it has 1 1/2 storeys, The windows are casements, and at the rear are plank doors and lofts.	II
Old Rectory; 54.87918°N 3.04809°W	—	Mid 18th century	The rectory, later a private house, was extended later in the 18th century. It is in brick on a chamfered stone plinth, with quoins and a green slate roof with a coped gable on the right. There are two storeys and three bays, with a two-storey two-bay extension to the left. The doorway has a plain surround. The windows are sashes, those in the original part have plain surrounds, and in the extension they have flat brick arches and stone sills. There is also a small fire window in the original part.	II
The Bow; 54.89490°N 3.03490°W	—	1769	A brick farmhouse on a chamfered stone plinth, with quoins and a green slate roof. There are two storeys and three bays. The doorway has a moulded architrave, a plain dated frieze, and a dentilled cornice. The windows are sashes with segmental brick arches, keystones, and moulded stone sills.	II
Bow; 54.89488°N 3.03530°W	—	Late 18th or early 19th century	A brick farmhouse with pale headers on a chamfered stone plinth, with quoins, a cornice, and a Welsh slate roof. There are two storeys and three bays. The round-headed doorway is flanked by Tuscan columns, and has a radial fanlight. The windows are sashes in moulded architraves.	II
Cross House Farm; 54.87872°N 3.04832°W	—	Late 18th or early 19th century	A brick farmhouse on a chamfered stone plinth, with quoins and a green slate roof. There are two storeys and three bays. The doorway and sash windows have moulded architraves.	II
Orton Park; 54.86589°N 3.00409°W	—	1830s	A country house that was extended later in the 19th century. It is stuccoed on a chamfered plinth, and has angle pilasters, a string course, a central parapet, and a Welsh slate roof with coped gables. There are two storeys and seven bays, and a lower extension of two storeys and five bays. On the front is a porch with four Greek Doric columns, and a doorway in an architrave with pilasters and an entablature. The windows are sashes with stone sills. At the rear are giant pilasters, and a modillioned and dentilled eaves cornice.	II
Lodges and gate, Orton Park; 54.86281°N 3.00030°W		1839	This consists of an archway flanked by symmetrical lodges, all in sandstone. The lodges are similar, each on a chamfered plinth, with quoins and a green slate roof. They have 1 1/2 storeys, two bays each, and canted bay windows. Between them is a flattened segmental arch.	II
Tempest Tower Farmhouse and Folly Tower; 54.88765°N 3.01651°W		Mid 19th century	The farmhouse is in brick with rusticated quoins and a Welsh slate roof. It has two storeys, three bays, and a recessed extension of two storeys and two bays on the right. The round-headed doorway is flanked by Ionic columns and has a radial fanlight, and the windows are sashes. The folly tower to the left is dated 1875. It is in mixed red sandstone and calciferous sandstone, with brick at the rear, and rendered sides. The tower has three storeys and contains a large cart entrance flanked by Ionic columns, round-headed windows, and a battlemented parapet.	II
War memorial 54.87905°N 3.04773°W	—	1920	The war memorial is in the churchyard of St Giles' Church. It consists of a granite boulder on a two-tiered square sandstone base. The front face of the boulder is smoothed and contains a bronze plaque, with a bronze cross at its tip. On the plaque is an inscription and the names of those lost in the First World War.	II
