= Milefortlet 1 =

Roman coastal fort in Cumbria, England

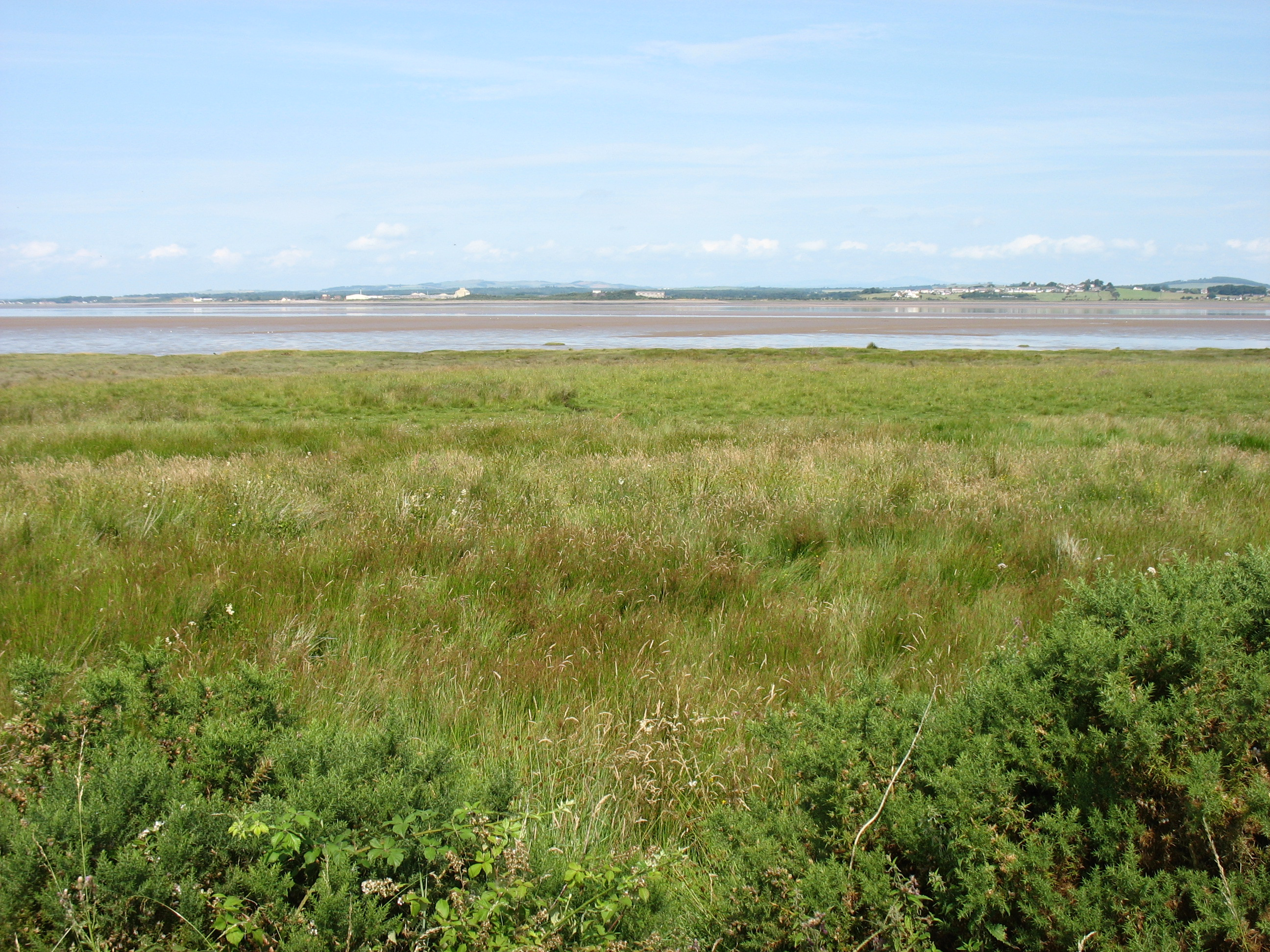
- View towards the Solway Firth near the site of Milefortlet 1

- Location within Cumbria
- 54.945407°N 3.237098°W
- Type: Milecastle
- Location: Cumbria, England

Milefortlet 1 (Biglands House) was a milefortlet of the Roman Cumbrian Coast defences. These milefortlets and intervening stone watchtowers extended from the western end of Hadrian's Wall, along the Cumbrian coast and were linked by a wooden palisade. They were contemporary with defensive structures on Hadrian's Wall. The remains of Milefortlet 1 survive as a slight earthwork.

== Description ==
Milefortlet 1 is situated in a field beside Biglands House in the civil parish of Bowness. Aerial photographs show a square platform about 50 metres wide surrounded by ditches. All that can be seen on the ground is a slight ridge defining the north side, and to a lesser extent, the west side.

== Excavations ==
The milefortlet was trial-trenched in 1954 and 1974, and fully excavated in 1975. The excavations revealed a rectangular fort measuring 40 metres by 50 metres. The original defence was a turf rampart 7 metres wide surrounded by a v-shaped ditch. There were three distinct phases in the fort's history when each time it was demolished and rebuilt. The dating evidence suggests that the fort was occupied throughout most of the 2nd century.

== Associated Towers ==
Each milefortlet had two associated towers, similar in construction to the turrets built along Hadrian's Wall. These towers were positioned approximately one-third and two-thirds of a Roman mile to the west of the Milefortlet, and would probably have been manned by part of the nearest Milefortlet's garrison. The towers associated with Milefortlet 1 are known as Tower 1A (grid reference NY20406165) and Tower 1B (grid reference NY2061). The exact locations of these two towers are uncertain. There was a distinct green mound at the approximate location of Tower 1A, but it was removed with the shingle for road building in the 1960s.
