= Baldwinholme =

Coordinates: 54.84°N 03.04°W

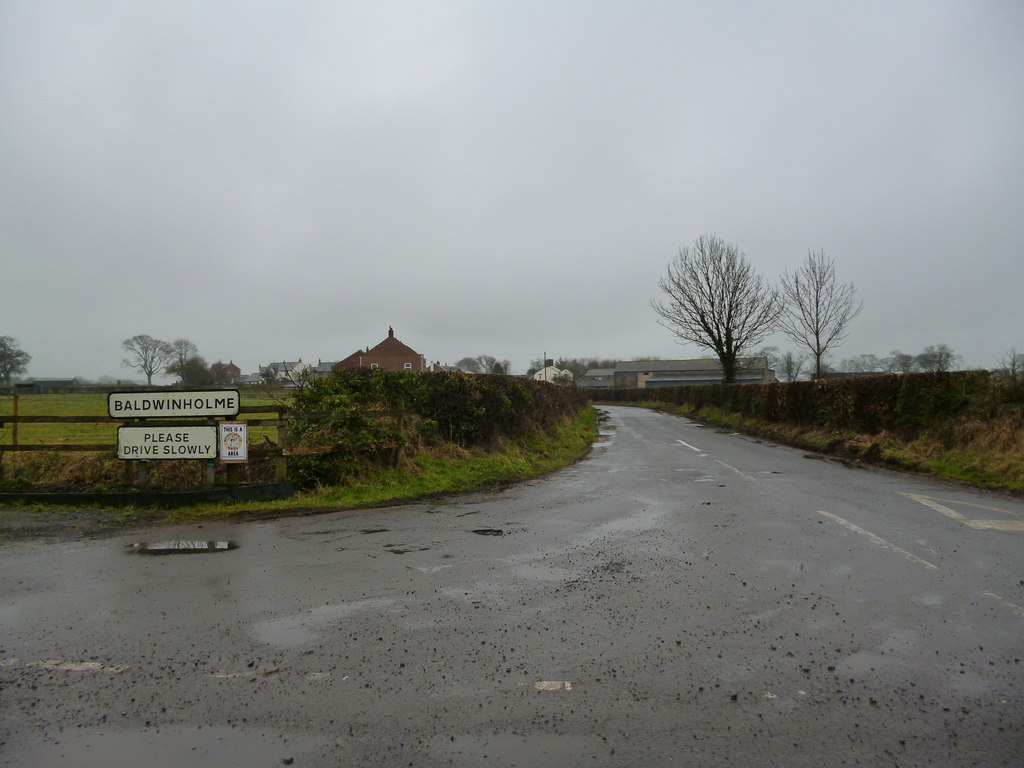

- Location in the former Carlisle district, Cumbria Location within Cumbria
- OS grid reference: NY3351
- Civil parish: Orton
- Unitary authority: Cumberland
- Ceremonial county: Cumbria
- Region: North West
- Country: England
- Sovereign state: United Kingdom
- Post town: CARLISLE
- Postcode district: CA5
- Dialling code: 01228
- Police: Cumbria
- Fire: Cumbria
- Ambulance: North West
- UK Parliament: Carlisle

Baldwinholme is a village in the civil parish of Orton, in the Cumberland district, in the ceremonial county of Cumbria, England. In 1870–1872 the township had a population of 234.

== See also ==
- Listed buildings in Orton, Cumberland
