= Gamelsby =

Village in Cumbria, England

Coordinates: 54.861°N 3.155°W

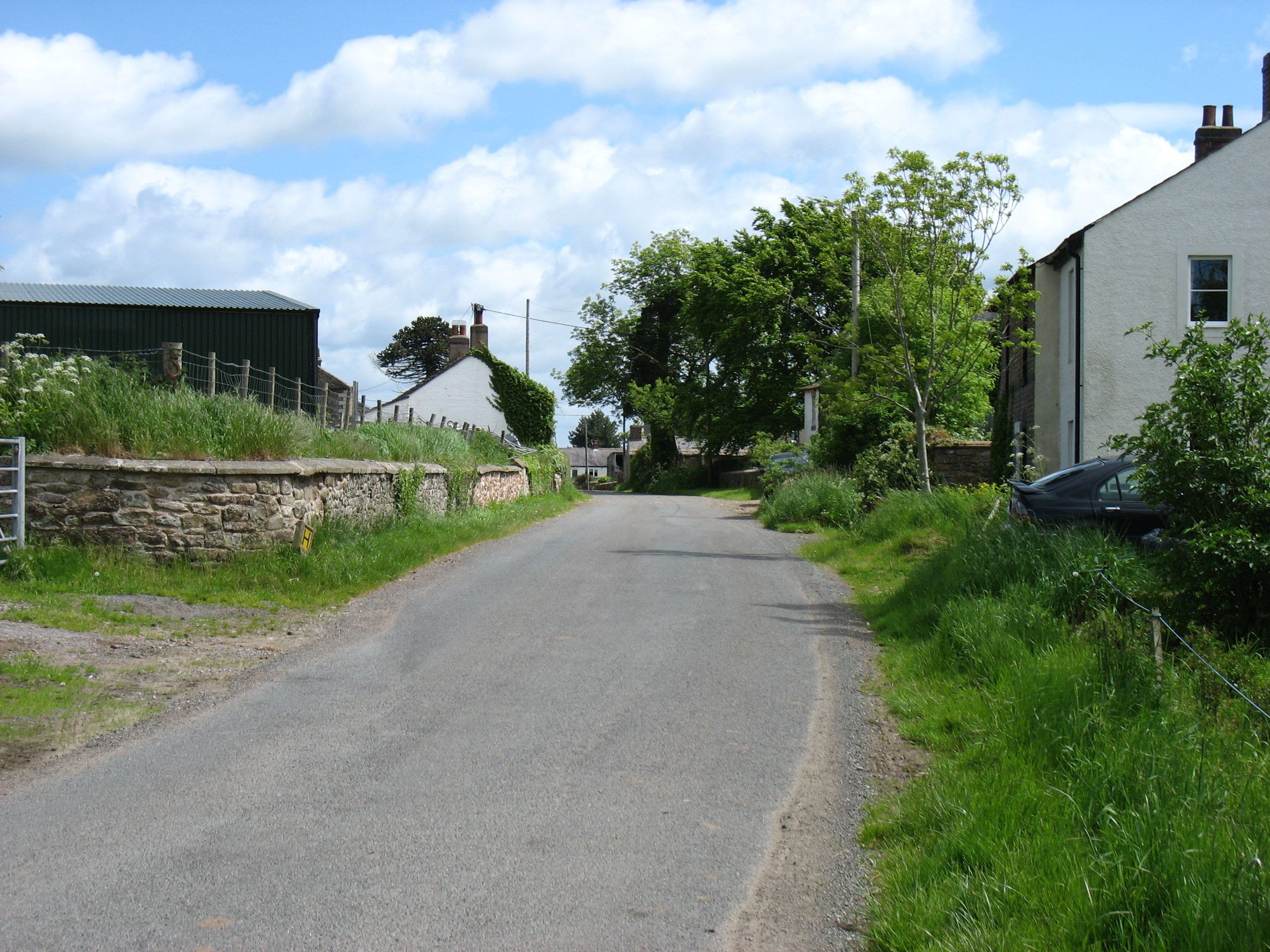
- The road into Gamelsby

- Location in Allerdale, Cumbria Location within Cumbria
- OS grid reference: NY258524
- Civil parish: Aikton
- Unitary authority: Cumberland
- Ceremonial county: Cumbria
- Region: North West
- Country: England
- Sovereign state: United Kingdom
- Post town: WIGTON
- Postcode district: CA7
- Dialling code: 016973
- Police: Cumbria
- Fire: Cumbria
- Ambulance: North West
- UK Parliament: Penrith and Solway

Gamelsby is a village near Aikton, Cumbria, England. It appears first in written records in 1305 as Gamelesby by Ayketon, and later as Gamelsby in 1332.
