= Little Orton, Cumbria =

Hamlet in Cumbria, England

Coordinates: 54.887°N 3.012°W

Little Orton
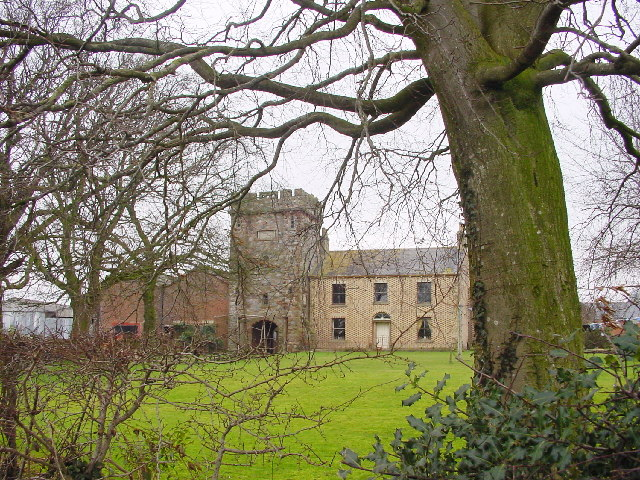
- Tempest Tower, Little Orton

- Location in the former Carlisle district, Cumbria Location within Cumbria
- OS grid reference: NY350551
- Civil parish: Orton
- Unitary authority: Cumberland
- Ceremonial county: Cumbria
- Region: North West
- Country: England
- Sovereign state: United Kingdom
- Post town: CARLISLE
- Postcode district: CA5
- Dialling code: 01228
- Police: Cumbria
- Fire: Cumbria
- Ambulance: North West
- UK Parliament: Carlisle

Little Orton is a hamlet in the civil parish of Orton, in the Cumberland district, in the ceremonial county of Cumbria, England.

Little Orton is due west of the city of Carlisle. Orton Moss lies between Little Orton and Great Orton to its west.

== See also ==
- Listed buildings in Orton, Cumberland
