= Orton, West Virginia =

Unincorporated community in West Virginia, US

Coordinates: 38°50′06″N 80°55′42″W

Orton is an unincorporated community in Gilmer County, in the U.S. state of West Virginia.

== History ==
A post office called Orton was established in 1909, and remained in operation until 1963. The community was named after Orton Mollohan, an early settler.
