= Milefortlet 3 =

Milefortlet of the Roman Cumbrian Coast defences

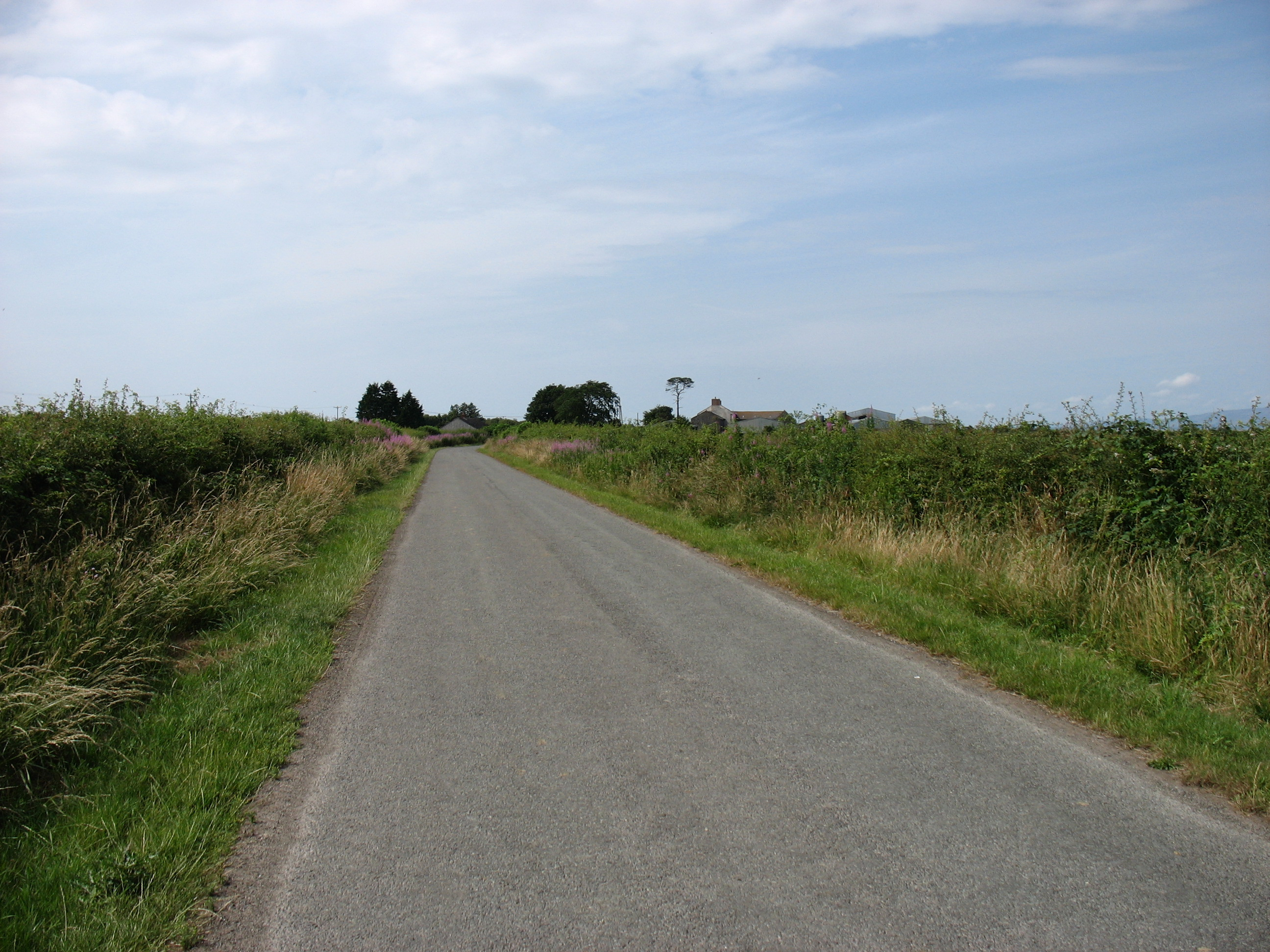
- Looking towards Pasture House Farm, and the approximate site of Milefortlet 3

- Location within Cumbria
- 54.932558°N 3.271664°W
- Type: Milecastle
- Location: Cumbria, England

Milefortlet 3 (Pasture House) was a Milefortlet of the Roman Cumbrian Coast defences. These milefortlets and intervening stone watchtowers extended from the western end of Hadrian's Wall, along the Cumbrian coast and were linked by a wooden palisade. They were contemporary with defensive structures on Hadrian's Wall. There is little to see on the ground but Milefortlet 3 has been located on aerial photographs.

== Description ==
Milefortlet 3 is situated in a field beside Pasture House Farm in the civil parish of Bowness. It was located in 1945 by the finding of turfwork immediately beyond the stream northeast of the farm. There is little to see from the ground but most of the outline of the milefortlet was seen as a soilmark on aerial photographs in 1946.

== Associated Towers ==
Each milefortlet had two associated towers, similar in construction to the turrets built along Hadrian's Wall. These towers were positioned approximately one-third and two-thirds of a Roman mile to the west of the Milefortlet, and would probably have been manned by part of the nearest Milefortlet's garrison. The towers associated with Milefortlet 3 are known as Tower 3A (grid reference NY18126042) and Tower 3B (grid reference NY17646031).

The position of Tower 3A is uncertain, although there used to be a mound in a field about 400 metres west of Pasture House. The site of Tower 3B is within another field, and is a Scheduled Ancient Monument. Tower 3B was excavated by in 1880 which revealed a flagged floor surface, on which were the remains of pottery, an amphora handle, human bones, and quantities of mussel shells.
