= Orton (photography) =

Photographic technique

Orton imagery, also called an Orton slide sandwich or the Orton Effect, is a photography technique which blends two different photos of the same scene, resulting in a distinctive mix of high and low detail areas within the same photo. It was originated by photographer Michael Orton in the mid 1980s.

== History ==
The original technique invented by Michael Orton was to overlay two or more images of an identical scene with very different exposures on slide film. One image is sharply focused and the others are very out of focus. Orton has also experimented with similar techniques, substituting one of the images in the composition for one of a different subject, such as a texture layer, or combining a multi-colored image and a monotone one.

== Example ==
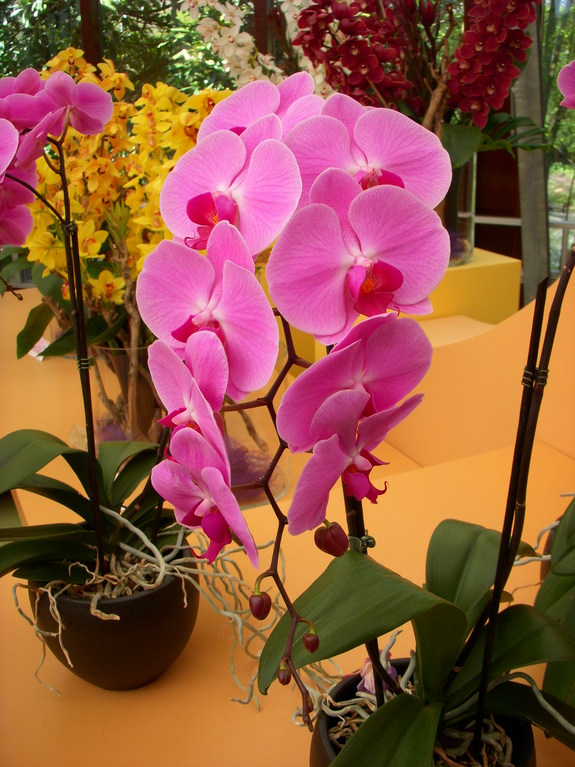
Photo from camera.

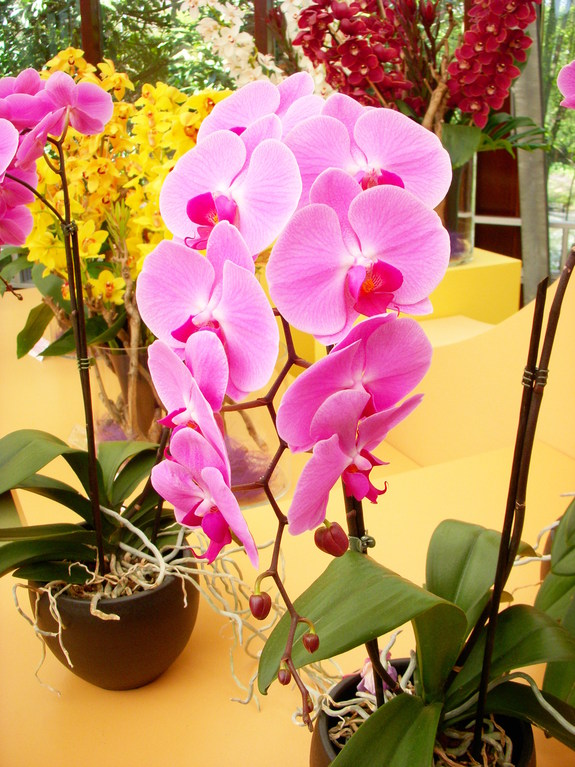
Lightened to produce "overexposed" image.

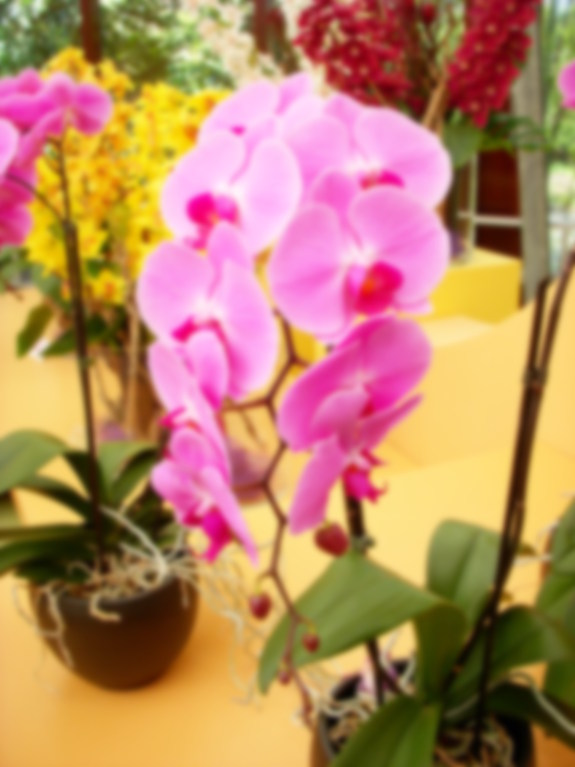
Overexposed image blurred out of focus.

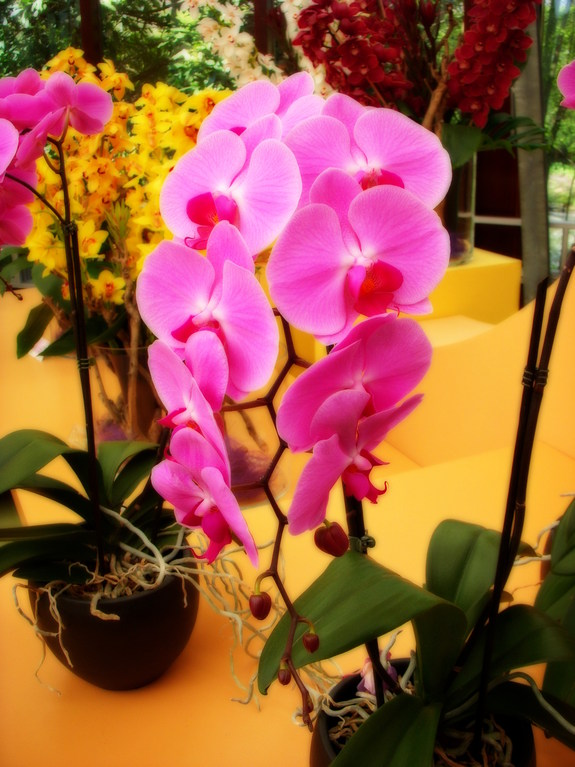
The two overexposed images are combined to produce the final result.

== Legacy ==
The technique can be replicated using photo editing software and a number now include a plug-in to achieve it automatically.
