= RAF Great Orton =

Former RAF airfield in Cumbria, England

RAF Great Orton
- Near Great Orton, Cumbria in England

Site information
- Type: Royal Air Force satellite station
- Code: GE
- Owner: Air Ministry
- Operator: Royal Air Force
- Controlled by: RAF Fighter Command * No. 9 Group RAF

Location
- Shown within Cumbria RAF Great Orton (the United Kingdom)
- Coordinates: 54°52′24″N 003°04′32″W

Site history
- Built: 1942/43
- In use: June 1943 - 1952
- Battles/wars: European theatre of World War II

Airfield information
- Elevation: 73 metres (240 ft) AMSL
Runways
Direction	Length and surface
00/00	Concrete
00/00	Concrete
00/00	Concrete

Royal Air Force Great Orton or more simply RAF Great Orton is a former Royal Air Force satellite station located west of Great Orton, Cumbria and the city of Carlisle, Cumbria, England.

== History ==
The following units were here at some point:

- No. 1 (Coastal) Engine Control Demonstration Unit RAF
- No. 3 Tactical Exercise Unit RAF
- No. 4 Tactical Exercise Unit RAF
- No. 6 Operational Training Unit RAF
- No. 55 OTU
- No. 60 Maintenance Unit RAF
- No. 219 Maintenance Unit RAF
- No. 249 Maintenance Unit RAF
- A detachment of No. 281 Squadron RAF with the Vickers Warwick I (1944–45)
- A detachment of No. 282 Squadron RAF with the Warwick I (1944–45)

== Use following closure ==
Following closure in 1954 the airfield was eventually sold into private ownership in 1964.

Between 1964 and 2001 the airfield was mainly used for agricultural purposes. Also, during this time, the airfield was occasionally used for motor car rallying.

Between 1988 and 2001 the Carlisle and District Gun Club ran clay pigeon shooting events on a regular basis. Great Orton Flying Club operated microlight aircraft from the airfield between 1989 and 2001.

During the early 1990’s a wind farm was constructed, initially comprising ten 300-kilawatt turbines. In 1999 the ten turbines were replaced with six new 660kw turbines. The wind farm is currently owned and operated by EDF Power Solutions.

During the 2001 outbreak of foot and mouth disease in the UK, Great Orton Airfield was selected as a mass burial site for slaughtered animals. This was the first of six sites used across the UK for mass burial.

In 2002 Watchtree Nature Reserve was established in order to remediate the mass burial site. The site is operated by Watchtree Nature Reserve Ltd, a registered charity. The nature reserve is now a well-developed local attraction and community asset.

== See also ==
- Listed buildings in Aikton
