= Orton Moss =

Protected area in Cumbria, England

Coordinates: 54.8809°N 3.0305°W

Orton Moss is a Site of Special Scientific Interest located west of the city of Carlisle in northwest England. Cumbria Wildlife Trust maintains it as a nature reserve.

Orton Moss is a former raised mire divided into strips and fields which would traditionally have been used for peat cutting and grazing. Formerly noted for its butterflies, it was once the homes of the wood white, (Leptidea sinapis), the large heath, (Coenonympha tullia) and the marsh fritillary (Euphydryas aurinia). Most fields are now abandoned causing an increase in woodland cover and these species have disappeared.

Part is maintained as wet meadow by annual mowing or grazing and devil's-bit scabious, knapweed, meadowsweet and wild angelica are abundant. Small remnants of raised mire vegetation including sphagnum moss, bog rosemary and royal fern.

Birds to be seen are willow tits, woodcock, great spotted woodpeckers and willow warblers.
