= Great Orton =

Village in Cumbria, England

Coordinates: 54.878°N 3.047°W

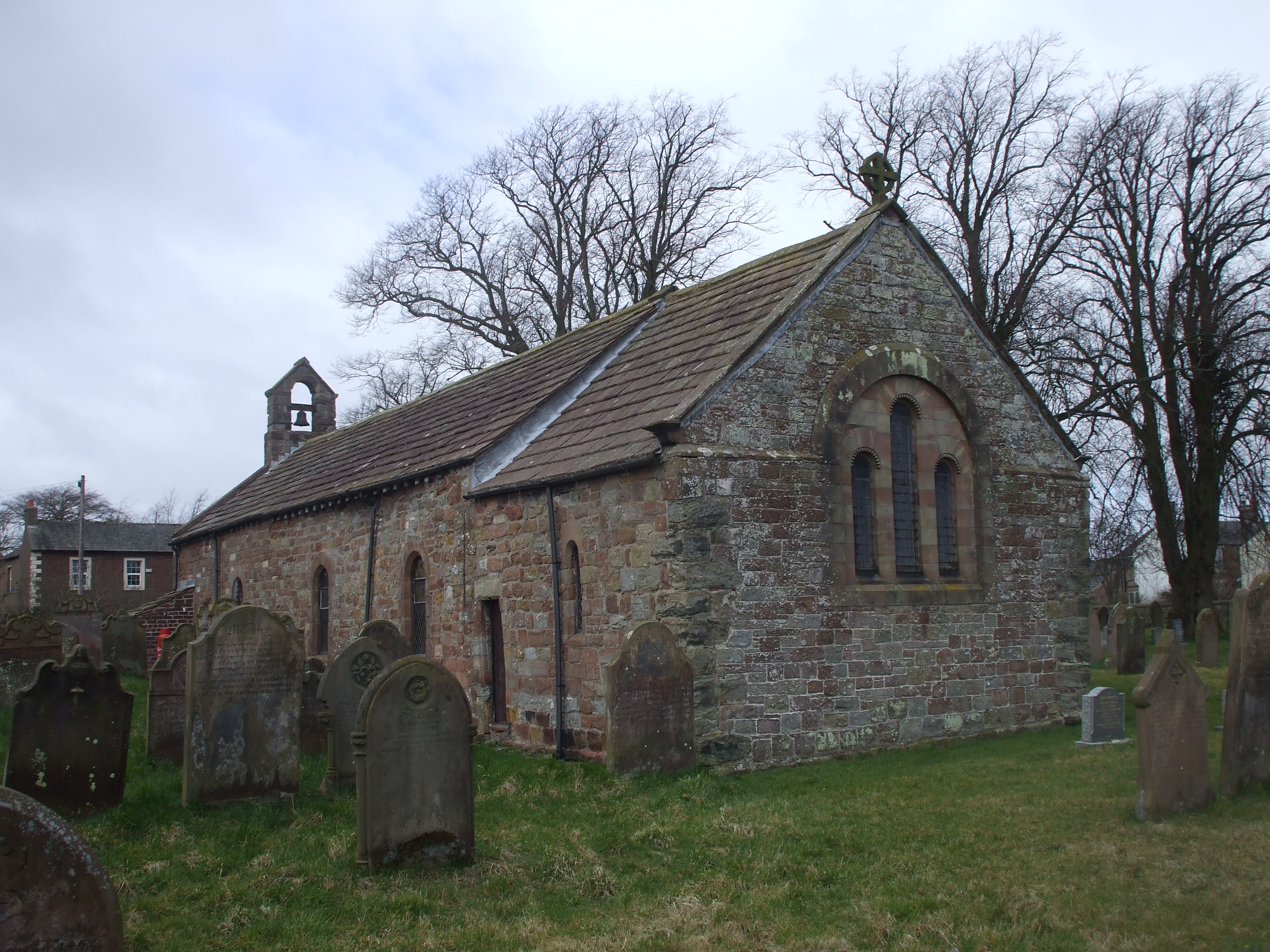
- St. Giles' Church, Great Orton

- Location in the former Carlisle district Location within Cumbria
- Population: 453 (2011)
- OS grid reference: NY328542
- Civil parish: Orton
- Unitary authority: Cumberland
- Ceremonial county: Cumbria
- Region: North West
- Country: England
- Sovereign state: United Kingdom
- Post town: CARLISLE
- Postcode district: CA5
- Dialling code: 01228
- Police: Cumbria
- Fire: Cumbria
- Ambulance: North West
- UK Parliament: Carlisle

Great Orton is a village in the civil parish of Orton, in the Cumberland district of the ceremonial county of Cumbria, England. The population of the civil parish taken at the 2011 census was 453. Historically, the village is part of Cumberland. From 1974 to 2023 it was in Carlisle district.

== Location ==
Great Orton is close to England's border with Scotland. The English city of Carlisle lies about five miles to the east, whereas the Scottish town of Gretna lies just eight miles to the north.

== Amenities ==
Great Orton has a primary school with nursery, a pub (the Wellington), a church (St Giles), a village hall and a butcher's shop (R J Mulholland). The village hall is available to hire and you can find more information at https://web.archive.org/web/20140328160249/http://www.greatortonvillagehall.co.uk/

== Nearby settlements ==
Nearby settlements include the city of Carlisle, the villages of Thursby, Little Orton, Kirkbampton, Thurstonfield, Moorhouse, Wiggonby and the hamlet of Orton Rigg.

== Transport ==
For transport there is the B5307 road, the A595 road and the A596 road. There is also Carlisle railway station about six miles away.

== See also ==
- Listed buildings in Orton, Cumberland
