= Listed buildings in Cumbria =

There are a number of listed buildings in Cumbria. The term "listed building", in the United Kingdom, refers to a building or structure designated as being of special architectural, historical, or cultural significance. Details of all the listed buildings are contained in the National Heritage List for England. They are categorised in three grades: Grade I consists of buildings of outstanding architectural or historical interest, Grade II* includes significant buildings of more than local interest and Grade II consists of buildings of special architectural or historical interest. Buildings in England are listed by the Secretary of State for Culture, Media and Sport on recommendations provided by English Heritage, which also determines the grading.

Some listed buildings are looked after by the National Trust or English Heritage while others are in private ownership or administered by trusts.

== Listed buildings by grade ==
- Grade I listed buildings in Cumbria
- Grade II* listed buildings in Cumberland
- Grade II* listed buildings in Westmorland and Furness

== Listed buildings by district or unitary authority ==
Within each local government district, buildings are listed by civil parish or unparished area.

=== Cumberland ===
- Listed buildings in Above Derwent
- Listed buildings in Aikton
- Listed buildings in Allhallows, Cumbria
- Listed buildings in Allonby
- Listed buildings in Arlecdon and Frizington
- Listed buildings in Arthuret
- Listed buildings in Askerton
- Listed buildings in Aspatria
- Listed buildings in Bassenthwaite
- Listed buildings in Beaumont, Cumbria
- Listed buildings in Bewcastle
- Listed buildings in Bewaldeth and Snittlegarth
- Listed buildings in Blennerhasset and Torpenhow
- Listed buildings in Blindbothel
- Listed buildings in Blindcrake
- Listed buildings in Boltons
- Listed buildings in Bootle, Cumbria
- Listed buildings in Borrowdale
- Listed buildings in Bothel and Threapland
- Listed buildings in Bowness
- Listed buildings in Brampton, Carlisle
- Listed buildings in Bridekirk
- Listed buildings in Brigham, Cumbria
- Listed buildings in Bromfield, Cumbria
- Listed buildings in Broughton, Cumbria
- Listed buildings in Broughton Moor
- Listed buildings in Burgh by Sands
- Listed buildings in Burtholme
- Listed buildings in Buttermere, Cumbria
- Listed buildings in Caldbeck
- Listed buildings in Camerton, Cumbria
- Listed buildings in Carlisle, Cumbria
- Listed buildings in Castle Carrock
- Listed buildings in Cleator Moor
- Listed buildings in Cockermouth
- Listed buildings in Crosscanonby
- Listed buildings in Cummersdale
- Listed buildings in Cumrew
- Listed buildings in Cumwhitton
- Listed buildings in Dalston, Cumbria
- Listed buildings in Dean, Cumbria
- Listed buildings in Distington
- Listed buildings in Drigg and Carleton
- Listed buildings in Dundraw
- Listed buildings in Embleton, Cumbria
- Listed buildings in Egremont, Cumbria
- Listed buildings in Ennerdale and Kinniside
- Listed buildings in Eskdale, Cumbria
- Listed buildings in Farlam
- Listed buildings in Gilcrux
- Listed buildings in Gosforth, Cumbria
- Listed buildings in Greysouthen
- Listed buildings in Haile, Cumbria
- Listed buildings in Hayton, Carlisle
- Listed buildings in Hayton and Mealo
- Listed buildings in Hethersgill
- Listed buildings in Holme Abbey
- Listed buildings in Holme East Waver
- Listed buildings in Holme Low
- Listed buildings in Holme St Cuthbert
- Listed buildings in Ireby and Uldale
- Listed buildings in Irthington
- Listed buildings in Irton with Santon
- Listed buildings in Keswick, Cumbria
- Listed buildings in Kingmoor
- Listed buildings in Kingwater
- Listed buildings in Kirkandrews
- Listed buildings in Kirklinton Middle
- Listed buildings in Kirkbampton
- Listed buildings in Kirkbride, Cumbria
- Listed buildings in Lamplugh
- Listed buildings in Lorton, Cumbria
- Listed buildings in Loweswater, Cumbria
- Listed buildings in Maryport
- Listed buildings in Millom
- Listed buildings in Millom Without
- Listed buildings in Moresby, Cumbria
- Listed buildings in Muncaster
- Listed buildings in Nether Denton
- Listed buildings in Orton, Carlisle
- Listed buildings in Oughterside and Allerby
- Listed buildings in Papcastle
- Listed buildings in Parton, Cumbria
- Listed buildings in Ponsonby, Cumbria
- Listed buildings in Plumbland
- Listed buildings in Rockcliffe, Cumbria
- Listed buildings in Scaleby
- Listed buildings in St Cuthbert Without
- Listed buildings in Stanwix Rural
- Listed buildings in Stapleton, Cumbria
- Listed buildings in Seascale
- Listed buildings in Seaton, Cumbria
- Listed buildings in Sebergham
- Listed buildings in Setmurthy
- Listed buildings in Solport
- Listed buildings in Silloth-on-Solway
- Listed buildings in St Bees
- Listed buildings in St. Bridget Beckermet
- Listed buildings in St. John Beckermet
- Listed buildings in Thursby
- Listed buildings in Underskiddaw
- Listed buildings in Upper Denton
- Listed buildings in Waberthwaite
- Listed buildings in Wasdale
- Listed buildings in Waterhead, Carlisle
- Listed buildings in Waverton, Cumbria
- Listed buildings in Weddicar
- Listed buildings in Westlinton
- Listed buildings in Westnewton, Cumbria
- Listed buildings in Westward, Cumbria
- Listed buildings in Wetheral
- Listed buildings in Whicham
- Listed buildings in Whitehaven
- Listed buildings in Wigton
- Listed buildings in Winscales
- Listed buildings in Woodside, Cumbria
- Listed buildings in Workington
- Listed buildings in Wythop

=== Westmorland and Furness ===
- Listed buildings in Ainstable
- Listed buildings in Aldingham
- Listed buildings in Alston Moor
- Listed buildings in Appleby-in-Westmorland
- Listed buildings in Arnside
- Listed buildings in Asby, Eden
- Listed buildings in Askam and Ireleth
- Listed buildings in Askham, Cumbria
- Listed buildings in Bampton, Cumbria
- Listed buildings in Barbon
- Listed buildings in Barrow-in-Furness
- Listed buildings in Barton, Cumbria
- Listed buildings in Beetham
- Listed buildings in Blawith and Subberthwaite
- Listed buildings in Bolton, Cumbria
- Listed buildings in Brough, Cumbria
- Listed buildings in Brougham, Cumbria
- Listed buildings in Broughton East
- Listed buildings in Broughton West
- Listed buildings in Burton-in-Kendal
- Listed buildings in Cartmel Fell
- Listed buildings in Castle Sowerby
- Listed buildings in Casterton, Cumbria
- Listed buildings in Catterlen
- Listed buildings in Claife
- Listed buildings in Cliburn, Cumbria
- Listed buildings in Clifton, Cumbria
- Listed buildings in Colby, Cumbria
- Listed buildings in Colton, Cumbria
- Listed buildings in Coniston, Cumbria
- Listed buildings in Crackenthorpe
- Listed buildings in Crook, Cumbria
- Listed buildings in Crosby Garrett
- Listed buildings in Crosby Ravensworth
- Listed buildings in Crosthwaite and Lyth
- Listed buildings in Culgaith
- Listed buildings in Dacre, Cumbria
- Listed buildings in Dalton Town with Newton
- Listed buildings in Dent, Cumbria
- Listed buildings in Dufton
- Listed buildings in Dunnerdale-with-Seathwaite
- Listed buildings in Egton with Newland
- Listed buildings in Fawcett Forest
- Listed buildings in Firbank
- Listed buildings in Garsdale
- Listed buildings in Glassonby
- Listed buildings in Grange-over-Sands
- Listed buildings in Grayrigg
- Listed buildings in Great Salkeld
- Listed buildings in Great Strickland
- Listed buildings in Greystoke, Cumbria
- Listed buildings in Hartley, Cumbria
- Listed buildings in Haverthwaite
- Listed buildings in Hawkshead
- Listed buildings in Helbeck
- Listed buildings in Helsington
- Listed buildings in Heversham
- Listed buildings in Hesket, Cumbria
- Listed buildings in Hincaster
- Listed buildings in Hoff, Cumbria
- Listed buildings in Holme, Cumbria
- Listed buildings in Hugill
- Listed buildings in Hunsonby
- Listed buildings in Hutton, Cumbria
- Listed buildings in Hutton Roof, Kirkby Lonsdale
- Listed buildings in Kaber, Cumbria
- Listed buildings in Kendal
- Listed buildings in Kentmere
- Listed buildings in Killington, Cumbria
- Listed buildings in King's Meaburn
- Listed buildings in Kirkby Ireleth
- Listed buildings in Kirkby Stephen
- Listed buildings in Kirkby Thore
- Listed buildings in Kirkoswald, Cumbria
- Listed buildings in Lakes, Cumbria
- Listed buildings in Lambrigg
- Listed buildings in Langwathby
- Listed buildings in Lazonby
- Listed buildings in Levens, Cumbria
- Listed buildings in Lindal and Marton
- Listed buildings in Lindale and Newton-in-Cartmel
- Listed buildings in Little Strickland
- Listed buildings in Long Marton
- Listed buildings in Longsleddale
- Listed buildings in Lower Allithwaite
- Listed buildings in Lower Holker
- Listed buildings in Lowick, Cumbria
- Listed buildings in Lowther, Cumbria
- Listed buildings in Lupton, Cumbria
- Listed buildings in Mallerstang
- Listed buildings in Mansergh, Cumbria
- Listed buildings in Martindale, Cumbria
- Listed buildings in Matterdale
- Listed buildings in Meathop and Ulpha
- Listed buildings in Middleton, Cumbria
- Listed buildings in Milburn, Cumbria
- Listed buildings in Milnthorpe
- Listed buildings in Morland, Cumbria
- Listed buildings in Mungrisdale
- Listed buildings in Murton, Cumbria
- Listed buildings in Musgrave, Cumbria
- Listed buildings in Nateby, Cumbria
- Listed buildings in Natland
- Listed buildings in Nether Staveley
- Listed buildings in Newbiggin, Kirkby Thore
- Listed buildings in Newby, Cumbria
- Listed buildings in New Hutton
- Listed buildings in Old Hutton and Holmescales
- Listed buildings in Ormside
- Listed buildings in Orton, Eden
- Listed buildings in Ousby
- Listed buildings in Over Staveley
- Listed buildings in Patterdale
- Listed buildings in Pennington, Cumbria
- Listed buildings in Penrith, Cumbria
- Listed buildings in Preston Patrick
- Listed buildings in Preston Richard
- Listed buildings in Ravenstonedale
- Listed buildings in Satterthwaite
- Listed buildings in Scalthwaiterigg
- Listed buildings in Sedbergh
- Listed buildings in Sedgwick, Cumbria
- Listed buildings in Shap
- Listed buildings in Shap Rural
- Listed buildings in Skelton, Cumbria
- Listed buildings in Skelsmergh
- Listed buildings in Skelwith
- Listed buildings in Sleagill
- Listed buildings in Sockbridge and Tirril
- Listed buildings in Soulby
- Listed buildings in Stainmore
- Listed buildings in Stainton (near Kendal)
- Listed buildings in Staveley-in-Cartmel
- Listed buildings in Strickland Ketel
- Listed buildings in Strickland Roger
- Listed buildings in Tebay
- Listed buildings in Temple Sowerby
- Listed buildings in Threlkeld
- Listed buildings in Thrimby
- Listed buildings in Torver
- Listed buildings in Ulverston
- Listed buildings in Underbarrow and Bradleyfield
- Listed buildings in Urswick
- Listed buildings in Waitby
- Listed buildings in Warcop
- Listed buildings in Wharton, Cumbria
- Listed buildings in Whinfell
- Listed buildings in Whitwell and Selside
- Listed buildings in Windermere, Cumbria (town)
- Listed buildings in Winton, Cumbria
- Listed buildings in Witherslack
- Listed buildings in Yanwath and Eamont Bridge

== Churches ==
- Grade I listed churches in Cumbria
