= Listed buildings in Seaton, Cumbria =

Seaton, Cumbria is a civil parish in the Cumberland district, Cumbria, England. It contains fourlisted buildings that are recorded in the National Heritage List for England. All the listed buildings are designated at Grade II, the lowest of the three grades, which is applied to "buildings of national importance and special interest". The parish contains the village of Seaton, and all the listed buildings are houses, two with attached outbuildings, and one that originated as the lodge to a country house.

== Buildings ==
Name and location	Photograph	Date	Notes
Fernleigh House and former barn 54.66326°N 3.52157°W	—	Late 18th century	The house was extended in the 19th century, and the house and former barn and stable have green slate roofs. The house is stuccoed on a chamfered plinth, and has quoins and an eaves cornice. There are two storeys and three bays, with a two-bay extension to the left. The doorway and the windows, which are sashes, have stone surrounds, and above the doorway is a shell hood. The attached lower barn and stable are in calciferous sandstone.
Grove House and former stables 54.65806°N 3.51984°W	—	Late 18th century	The house and former stables are roughcast with green slate roofs. The house has quoins, and is in two storeys and three bays. The doorway has an architrave and above the door is a fanlight. The windows are sashes in stone surrounds. The stable to the left has doorways and a loft door.
Ivy Lodge; 54.66340°N 3.50745°W	—	Early 19th century	This was originally the lodge to Camerton Hall, and later a private house. It is in calciferous sandstone, and has angle pilasters and a dentilled battlemented parapet. The original part is in one storey and one bay, with a single-bay single-storey wing to the left and a porch to the right. At the rear is a two-storey four-bay extension. In the main part is a canted bay window containing windows with pointed heads and Gothic tracery. The windows in the wing are similar, but without the tracery, and in the extension are 20th-century windows.
Derwent Gardens; 54.66126°N 3.51305°W	—	1842	A house in calciferous sandstone with quoins and a green slate roof. There are two storeys and four bays. The doorway and windows, which are sashes, have stone surrounds, and above the doorway is an oval dated panel.
