= Listed buildings in Papcastle =

Papcastle is a civil parish in the Cumberland district in Cumbria, England. It contains 22 listed buildings that are recorded in the National Heritage List for England. All the listed buildings are designated at Grade II, the lowest of the three grades, which is applied to "buildings of national importance and special interest". The parish contains the village of Papcastle and the surrounding countryside. Almost all the listed buildings are houses and associated structures in the village. The other listed buildings are a farmhouse and a milestone at Dovenby Craggs.

== Buildings ==
Name and location	Photograph	Date	Notes
Grove Cottage; 54.66877°N 3.38338°W	—	Mid 17th century	The house was extended in the 20th century. It is rendered with a Welsh slate roof, and has two storeys. The original part has two bays, there is a two -storey extension to the left, and a rounded stair projection to the right. The windows date from the 20th century.
Croft House and former stables 54.66967°N 3.38430°W	—	Late 17th century	The house and adjoining former stable are stuccoed with a green slate roof, and they have two storeys. The house has three bays, sash windows in stone surrounds, and a doorway with an architrave, a fanlight, and a cornice with consoles. The stable has three bays, and contains doorways, a loft door, and windows with chamfered surrounds, a garage door, and a sash window.
Manor House and Manor Cottage; 54.66931°N 3.38326°W	—	Late 17th to early 18th century	Originally one house incorporating part of a mid-17th century house, later divided into two dwellings. It is stuccoed with an eaves cornice and a green slate roof, and contains sash windows in chamfered surrounds. There are two storeys and seven bays. The doorway of Manor House has a bolection architrave with a pulvinated frieze and an open segmental pediment, and the doorway of Manor Cottage has an architrave.
Wall and gate piers, Manor House and Manor Cottage; 54.66938°N 3.38318°W	—	Late 17th to early 18th century	The walls surround the garden in front of the house and cottage. They are in calciferous sandstone rubble and have flat coping. The two gate piers are rusticated and have urn finials.
Orchard Cottage and Barford Cottage; 54.66879°N 3.38303°W	—	Early 18th century	A pair of roughcast houses with a green slate roof, in two storeys. Orchard Cottage has four bays, and Barford Cottage has two. The windows are sashes, those in Barford Cottage with blind segmental arches. Orchard Cottage has a wooden porch, and Barford Cottage has a doorway with an architrave. In the left return is a re-set inscribed lintel.
Rose Hill and The Cottage; 54.66999°N 3.38105°W	—	18th century (probable)	A pair of roughcast houses with angle pilasters and a hipped green slate roof. They are in two storeys, and each house has three bays. Both houses have doorways with pilasters and fanlights, and sash windows in stone surrounds. Rose Hill also has a garage door, and The Cottage has a canted bay window.
Wall in front of The Grove; 54.66832°N 3.38359°W	—	Mid 18th century	The wall encloses the garden to the front of the house. It is roughcast with plain stone coping. There are plain gate openings in the front and at the left side.(architecture)|
West Worth and West Garth; 54.67006°N 3.38460°W	—	Mid 18th century	The house was extended in the 19th century, and has been divided into two dwellings. It is roughcast with green slate roofs. The original part has two storeys with an attic, five bays, a moulded eaves cornice, and quoins. There is a three-bay rear extension and a two-storey four-bay extension on the left, giving an L-shaped plan. The doorway has an architrave, and most of the windows are sashes.
Wall and gate piers, West Worth and West Garth; 54.66998°N 3.38438°W	—	Mid 18th century	The wall runs along two sides of the garden. It is roughcast with chamfered coping. The two gate piers are rusticated and have moulded caps.
The Grove and former stables 54.66842°N 3.38354°W	—	1753	The house and former stables are roughcast. The house has a chamfered plinth, quoins, an eaves cornice, and a green slate roof. There are two storeys and five bays. The central bay projects forward under a pedimented gable on scrolled brackets, and contains a round-headed stair window in the upper floor and a pilastered porch. The other windows are sashes in architraves. To the right of the house is a single-storey extension linking to the stables. These are at right-angles, they have a tile roof with a weathervane, a sundial, casement windows, and a segmental arch.
Papcastle House; 54.66953°N 3.38416°W		Mid or late 18th century	A stuccoed house on a chamfered plinth with quoins, an eaves cornice, and a green slate roof. There are two storeys and five bays, and the house has a double span. On the front is a porch that has fluted Doric columns and a triglyph frieze, and above the door is a fanlight. Most of the windows are sashes, and on the right is a three-light Victorian window in both floors.
Camp Farmhouse; 54.67034°N 3.38477°W	—	Late 18th century	The former farmhouse is stuccoed with quoins and a green slate roof. It has two storeys and five bays, with a two-storey three-bay extension to the rear. The doorways in the front and the right return have quoined surrounds and fanlights. The windows were originally mullioned, and have been replaced by sash windows in architraves, the mullions having been removed from all the windows but one.
Lynwood House; 54.66885°N 3.38361°W	—	Late 18th century	A roughcast house on a chamfered plinth, with quoins, an eaves cornice, and a green slate roof with coped gables. It has two storeys, five bays, sash windows in stone architraves, and a doorway with a rusticated architrave and a fanlight. At the rear is a double-span extension containing flat cross-mullioned windows.
Wall and gate piers, Papcastle House; 54.66955°N 3.38401°W	—	Late 18th century	The walls surround the garden at the front of the house. They are roughcast with stone coping. In the centre is a pair of rusticated gate piers with shaped caps and ball finials.
Rosebank; 54.66994°N 3.38139°W	—	Late 18th century	The house was extended in the 19th century. It is roughcast on a chamfered plinth, with a string course, quoins, and a green slate roof with coped gables. There are two storeys, the original part has a symmetrical three-bay front, and there is a single-bay extension to the left. The doorway has a stone architrave, a fanlight, and a pediment, and the windows are sashes with stone surrounds.
Wall and railings opposite The Grove; 54.66829°N 3.38355°W	—	Late 18th century	The wall runs along a field and is in calciferous sandstone. It has chamfered coping and rusticated end piers with shaped caps. On the wall are spearhead cast iron railings.
Beech House; 54.66929°N 3.38285°W	—	Late 18th or early 19th century	A roughcast house with angle pilasters, an eaves cornice, and a green slate roof. There are two storeys and three bays, and the windows are sashes with stone surrounds.
Wall and gate piers, Lynwood House; 54.66888°N 3.38347°W	—	Late 18th or early 19th century	The wall encloses the front garden of the house. It is roughcast with a moulded flat coping. In the centre is a pair of quoined gate piers.
Milestone; 54.68313°N 3.39077°W	—	Late 18th or early 19th century	The milestone was provided for the Cockermouth-Maryport Turnpike. It is in stone and has a curved face with a cast iron plate inscribed with the distances in miles to Cockermouth Court-House and to Maryport Market Place.
Dovenby Craggs; 54.68291°N 3.39155°W	—	Early 19th century	A rendered farmhouse with quoins and a hipped green slate roof. It has two storeys, three bays, sash windows in stone surrounds, and a doorway with a quoined surround.
Greenbank and The Hollys; 54.66856°N 3.38273°W	—	Early 19th century	A pair of stuccoed houses with a hipped green slate roof. They have two storeys, and each house has three bays. The central two bays project forward under a pedimented gable. The windows are sashes. In the central bays the ground floor windows have three lights, and above the window in The Hollys is a segmental pediment. Greenbank has a conservatory porch, and The Hollys has a doorway with pilasters and a fanlight, and to the right a smaller conservatory.
Lindenside Cottage; 54.66981°N 3.38149°W	—	Early 19th century	A roughcast house with angle pilasters, and a green slate roof with coped gables. There are two storeys, three bays, and stone surrounds to the openings. The door has a radial fanlight, and the windows are sashes.
