= Nether Denton =

Civil parish in Cumbria, England

Coordinates: 54.961°N 2.621°W

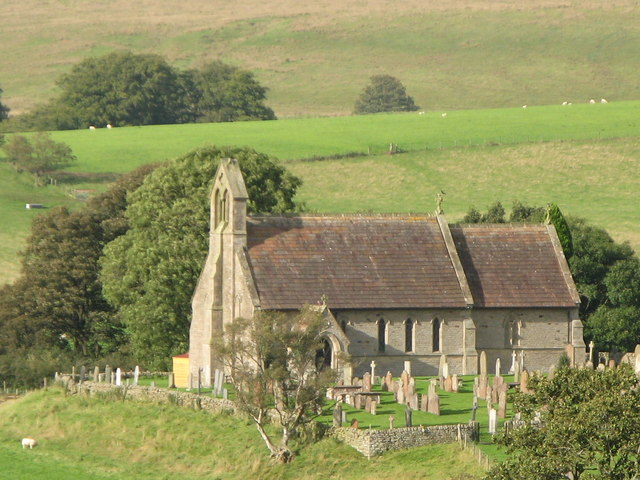
- St Cuthbert's Church, Nether Denton

- Location within Cumbria
- Population: 408 (2021 (including Upper Denton))
- OS grid reference: NY602631
- Civil parish: Nether Denton
- Unitary authority: Cumberland
- Ceremonial county: Cumbria
- Region: North West
- Country: England
- Sovereign state: United Kingdom
- Post town: BRAMPTON
- Postcode district: CA8
- Dialling code: 016977
- Police: Cumbria
- Fire: Cumbria
- Ambulance: North West
- UK Parliament: Carlisle
- Website: www.netherdenton.com

Nether Denton is a scattered settlement and civil parish in rural Cumbria, England, situated about 12 miles (19 km) north-east of Carlisle, by the A69 road. The population of the parish taken at the 2021 census was 408. Nether Denton is a couple of miles south-west of the village of Upper Denton. The parish contains the village of Low Row.

St Cuthbert's Church at Nether Denton is built at the site of a Roman fort, around 0.5 miles (0.80 km) south of Hadrian's Wall on the Stanegate road. The present building dates from 1868 to 1870, but there has been a church on the site since the 12th century. Denton Hall, now a farmhouse, comprises a 14th-century pele tower, gabled and reduced in height, adjoining a house of 1829. The walls of the tower are 2m thick.

== See also ==
- Listed buildings in Nether Denton
