= Listed buildings in Wigton =

Wigton is a civil parish and town in the Cumberland unitary authority area of Cumbria, England. It contains 51 listed buildings that are recorded in the National Heritage List for England. Of these, one is listed at Grade II*, the middle of the three grades, and the others are at Grade II, the lowest grade. Most of the listed buildings are in or near the town centre, and mainly comprise shops and houses. There are also churches, public houses, hotels, schools, a bank, and a memorial drinking fountain. Further from the town centre, the listed buildings include a farmhouse and barn, a former mill, a war memorial, and a milestone.

== Key ==
Grade	Criteria
II*	Particularly important buildings of more than special interest
II	Buildings of national importance and special interest

== Buildings ==
Name and location	Photograph	Date	Notes	Grade
Vicarage wall 54.82196°N 3.15906°W	—	Late 16th or early 17th century (probable)	Part of a wall of the former vicarage retained as a garden feature, it is in sandstone (probably Roman blocks). The structure has two storeys, and contains a blocked entrance, a window with a chamfered surround and, in the upper storey part of a two-light mullioned window.	II
South Grange; 54.81988°N 3.16051°W	—	Mid 17th century	Originally a farmhouse that was extended in 1835, the original building has been converted into a garage, and the extension into a house. The original house has two storeys and two bays, with a lower storey in sandstone, an upper storey in brick, and a sandstone slate roof. The windows, of varying types, have been blocked. The present house has two storeys and two bays. On the front is a gabled porch, a doorway with a Tudor arched head and a hood mould, and two-light mullioned windows with hood moulds.	II
Spittal Farmhouse; 54.83375°N 3.14854°W	—	17th century	The farmhouse is in sandstone, the main part dating from the 18th century. The main part has a chamfered plinth, a string course, quoins, and a green slate roof. It has two storeys and six bays, and a two-bay extension at right angles to the rear. To the left is the original house which is in two storeys and two bays, with a single-bay extension. The porch has an architrave and a pediment. The windows vary; some are cross-mullioned (some of which are blocked), and others are sashes. Inside the original house are a pair of upper crucks, an inglenook and a bressumer.	II
10 and 12 Longthwaite Road; 54.81893°N 3.16153°W	—	1662	A pair of houses, the later one dated 1688. They are in sandstone on a chamfered plinth, and have quoins and a green slate roof. The houses are in two storeys and have three bays each. The doorways have chamfered surrounds, inscribed and dated lintels, and hood moulds. Flanking the doorway of No. 12 are round-headed niches. The windows are casements, also with chamfered surrounds and hood moulds.	II
Hare and Hounds; 54.82461°N 3.16188°W	—	Late 17th or early 18th century	A public house incorporating a former shop to the right, stuccoed with a Welsh slate roof. There are two storeys and two bays, with a further bay over a carriage arch to the left, and two bays in the former shop to the right. The doorway and sash windows have stone surrounds, and the carriage arch has a flat head.	II
Arlosh House; 54.82429°N 3.16249°W	—	1716	The house is in ashlar on a chamfered plinth, and has a string course, an eaves cornice, and a roof of Welsh slate at the front and green slate at the rear. There are two storeys and five bays, and the house has a double span. The doorway has a moulded surround, a patterned fanlight, and a swan-neck pediment. The windows are sashes in stone surrounds.	II
1–3 Church Street; 54.82399°N 3.15967°W		1723	A row of three houses, originally almshouses, in rendered sandstone on a chamfered plinth, with quoins and a Welsh slate roof. There are two storeys and eight bays. The doorways have shaped lintels, the windows are sashes, and all have chamfered surrounds and hood moulds. On the front is an inscribed panel.	II
31 New Street; 54.82608°N 3.16135°W	—	1746	A brick house on a chamfered plinth, with quoins, an eaves cornice, and a green slate roof. There are two storeys and five bays, with another bay to the right over an arch. Two steps lead to a doorway with a bolection architrave, a pulvinated frieze, and a cornice. The windows are sashes with architraves. The arch is segmental with an alternate block surround, voussoirs, and a dated and inscribed keystone.	II
Midland Bank; 54.82520°N 3.16086°W		Mid 18th century	The bank is stuccoed on a moulded plinth, and has a modillioned cornice and a green slate roof. There are two storeys and four bays, and a further bay to the right over an arch. Five steps lead up to a doorway that has a Doric doorcase with panelled reveals, a dentilled cornice, and an ornamental pediment. The windows are sashes in architraves, those in the lower floor with dentilled cornices. The archway is segmental with alternate block surrounds and cast iron bollards. Inside the arch is a re-set dated and inscribed lintel.	II
13 and 29 New Street; 54.82572°N 3.16085°W	—	Mid and late 18th century	Two adjoining houses; No. 13 is in brick and No. 29 is pebbledashed, and both have roofs partly of green slate and partly of sandstone slate. They are in two storeys, and each house has three bays, No. 29 having an extra bay over a shared archway. They both have sash windows in architraves, and each has a doorway with an architrave, a fanlight, a keystone frieze, and a cornice. No. 29 is on a chamfered plinth and has quoins.	II
16 High Street; 54.82423°N 3.16084°W	—	Late 18th century	Originally a public house, later a labour club, it is stuccoed with a modillioned gutter and a green slate roof. There are three storeys, three bays, and a doorway with a pilastered doorcase. The windows are sashes, those in the ground floor being double.	II
Burnfoot; 54.82620°N 3.15720°W	—	Late 18th century	A house that was extended in the early 19th century, it is rendered on the front, and has a chamfered plinth, a panelled string course, pilastered quoins on the left, and a green slate roof. There are two storeys, two bays at the front, and four at the rear. The doorway has a Tuscan doorcase with an open pediment and a fanlight. The windows are sashes in stone surrounds. At the rear the wall is in sandstone and there is a round-headed stair window.	II
Lion and Lamb Hotel; 54.82419°N 3.16048°W		Late 18th century	A rendered public house on a chamfered plinth, with a roof of green slate repaired with Welsh slate. It has three storeys, four bays, and an extension at the rear. The doorway has an Ionic doorcase with a pediment, and the windows are sashes in stone surrounds.	II
Old Lane Mill; 54.82906°N 3.16293°W		Late 18th century	A former windmill in sandstone with a Welsh slate roof, it has been without sails since the 1840s. The structure has an elliptical plan, and the walls taper in an asymmetrical manner. There are five storeys, it is 55 feet (17 m) high, it contains doors, and small windows at different levels. There is a three-storey rectangular steam-mill extension containing a cart entrance, loft doors and windows, and also the base of a square chimney.	II
Thomlinson Junior School; 54.82274°N 3.16024°W	—	Late 18th century	Originally a house that was altered in 1800–07, and extended to become a school in 1898. The original house is in brick on a chamfered plinth with quoins and a green slate roof. It has two storeys, five bays, and a three-bay extension. It has a prostyle Doric porch with a triglyph and metope frieze under a dentilled cornice. The windows are sashes in stone surrounds. The school extension to the right is in red brick, and consists of a three storey, three-bay block, and a hall. The block has a porch with a single Ionic column, and casement windows in alternate block surrounds. In the hall are mullioned windows and a battlemented gable.	II
St Mary's Church; 54.82373°N 3.15947°W		1788	The church stands on a medieval site, it was restored in 1881 by C. J. Ferguson, and a vestry was added in 1912. The church is built in red sandstone on a chamfered plinth, and has quoins, a string course, an eaves cornice, a parapet, and a green slate roof. The nave has two storeys and eight bays, and there is a lower single-bay chancel, a north vestry, and a three-stage west tower incorporating a porch. The tower has a clock face with a modillioned surround, round-headed bell openings, and a modillioned embattled parapet with pinnacles. Inside the church there are galleries on three sides.	II*
62–66 King Street and 1 Market Hill; 54.82588°N 3.15882°W	—	1793	A row of four shops and offices, mainly pebbledashed, on a moulded plinth, with string courses, a dentilled cornice, angle pilasters, and a hipped Welsh slate roof. They have three storeys, the three units facing King Street have three bays each, and the unit on the left, facing Market Hill has two bays. The houses have sash windows in stone surrounds, and each house facing King Street has a doorway with a Tuscan doorcase with an open pediment, and a fanlight. The unit facing Market Hill has a doorway with a pilastered surround, a cornice on console brackets, and a fanlight. To the left is a shop window, and beyond that is a segmental carriage arch with a quoined surround and a dated keystone.	II
5 Market Hill; 54.82580°N 3.15848°W	—	Late 18th or early 19th century	The house is part of a terrace, it is in brick on a chamfered plinth, and has a green slate roof. There are three storeys with a cellar, and one bay. Steps lead up to a doorway with an architrave and a fanlight, and most of the windows are sashes in stone surrounds.	II
7, 8, 11 and 12 Market Hill; 54.82570°N 3.15830°W	—	Late 18th or early 19th century	A terrace of four stuccoed houses on a chamfered plinth with a tile roof, in three storeys. No. 8 has two bays, and the others have one. The windows are sashes. Nos. 11 and 12 have quoins, and doorways and windows in architraves. The doors and windows of Nos. 7 and 8 have stone surrounds.	II
King's Arms and 5 Market Place; 54.82485°N 3.16146°W		Late 18th or early 19th century	A public house and adjoining shop, both rendered, with a green slate roof and in three storeys. The public house has four bays, quoins, a chamfered plinth, and doors and sash windows with round-headed stone surrounds. No. 5 has two bays, angle pilasters, an eaves cornice, shop windows in the ground floor, and sash windows above.	II
Milestone; 54.82712°N 3.15520°W	—	Late 18th or early 19th century	The milestone was provided for the Carlisle to Cockermouth turnpike road. It is in red sandstone and has a round top and a curved face. On it is a cast iron plate inscribed with the distances in miles to Carlisle and Cockermouth.	II
Vicarage; 54.82216°N 3.15890°W	—	c. 1800	The vicarage was extended in the middle of the 19th century. It is in stone on a rusticated plinth, and has pilastered quoins and a green slate roof. There are two storeys and three bays, with an additional bay to the right. The doorway has an Ionic porch and a fanlight, and the windows are sashes. In the end wall is a sculptured Roman figure.	II
Wigton Hall; 54.82371°N 3.16421°W	—	1801	A house, later used as offices, in calciferous sandstone on a chamfered plinth, with a modillioned cornice, a battlemented parapet, and a green slate roof. There are two storeys and eight bays, with flanking wings in red sandstone, giving a U-shaped plan. The left wing is stuccoed. There is a two-storey gabled porch with a coat of arms, a pointed arch, a hood mould, and a gabled parapet with quatrefoil openings. The windows are sashes.	II
46, 48 and 50 High Street; 54.82325°N 3.16007°W	—	1816	A row of three rendered houses on a chamfered plinth with green slate roofs, in two storeys and with sash windows in stone surrounds. No. 50 has one bay, and the others each have two bays. Nos. 50 and 48 have doorways with stone surrounds and pediments, No. 46 has a cornice with console brackets.	II
18 High Street; 54.82413°N 3.16082°W	—	Early 19th century	The main part originated as a house, it has been used later for other purposes, and at the rear is an earlier house dated 1730. The main part is stuccoed on a moulded plinth, and has quoins, a dentilled cornice, and a slate roof. There are three storeys and four bays, with three bays at the rear, and the original two-storey two-bay house, giving an L-shaped plan. In the first bay is a segmental archway, the second bay contains a doorway that has a reeded pilaster surround, an entablature, and a dentilled cornice, and in the right two bays is a canted bay window. Above, the windows are sashes, those in the middle floor having dentilled cornices.	II
54A, 56, 58 and 60 King Street; 54.82575°N 3.15911°W	—	Early 19th century	A row of houses and shops in sandstone on a chamfered plinth, with quoins, and a roof partly in Welsh slate and partly tiled. They are in two storeys with cellars, and each unit has one bay. Steps lead up to the doors, wrought iron railings surround the cellar areas, and the shop has a bow window and a shop front.	II
18 and 20 Longthwaite Road; 54.81875°N 3.16188°W	—	Early 19th century	Two sandstone houses with quoins, eaves modillions, and a tiled roof. They have two storeys, and each house has one bay. The doorways have chamfered surrounds and chamfered lintels. In the ground floor are two-light mullioned sash windows with hood moulds, and in the upper floor are lancet windows with chamfered surrounds and hood moulds.	II
2–11 Proctor's Row; 54.82334°N 3.15932°W	—	Early 19th century	A terrace of ten houses of differing dates. Nos. 2–4 are in sandstone on a chamfered plinth, Nos. 5–8 are in brick, and Nos. 9–11 are stuccoed. They have two storeys, some have cellars, and the roofs are mainly in green slate with some Welsh slate. The earlier houses have one bay, and the later houses have two. The windows are sashes, and the doorways have various surrounds, some with cornices on bracketed consoles.	II
2 West Street; 54.82474°N 3.16162°W	—	Early 19th century	A shop with residential accommodation above, it is stuccoed with pilasters, a dentilled cornice, and a hipped tile roof. There are two storeys and three bays. In the ground floor is a shop front with an entrance flanked by columns. To the left is a doorway with a moulded surround. The windows are sashes in architraves, those in the middle floor having cornices on console brackets.	II
16 and 18 West Street; 54.82439°N 3.16238°W	—	Early 19th century	A pair of stuccoed houses on a chamfered plinth, with a string course, a dentilled cornice, a parapet, and a green slate roof. They have three storeys and cellars; No. 16 has two bays, and No. 18 has one. Steps lead up to the doorways that have Tuscan doorcases with pediments and radial fanlights. The windows are sashes, and beneath each window is a panel.	II
31, 33 and 35 West Street; 54.82382°N 3.16294°W	—	Early 19th century	A row of three sandstone houses on a chamfered plinth, with an eaves cornice, angle pilasters, and a green slate roof. They have two storeys, and each house has two bays. The doorways have Tuscan doorcases with pediments and fanlights, and the windows are sashes with stone surrounds.	II
Boundary stone 54.82159°N 3.15980°W	—	Early 19th century	The boundary stone, which also acts as a gatepost, is a square stone post with a shaped head. It is inscribed with the initials W A B C and S E H.	II
Burnfoot House; 54.82705°N 3.15661°W	—	Early 19th century	A stone house, divided into two flats, on a chamfered plinth with quoins and a green slate roof. There are two storeys and three bays, and a lower recessed two-bay extension on the left. The doorway has a Tuscan doorcase with an open pediment, and a fanlight. The windows in the main part are sashes with stone surrounds, and in the extension they are casements.	II
Former Schoolmaster's House; 54.82024°N 3.18102°W	—	Early 19th century	A sandstone house with chamfered quoins and a hipped slate roof. There are two storeys and a symmetrical three-bay front. The central doorway has an ashlar doorcase and a shallow hood cornice. The windows are sashes.	II
Kirkland Gardens; 54.82722°N 3.14714°W	—	Early 19th century	A sandstone house with a green slate roof and octagonal chimney stacks. It has one storey with an attic, and two bays. The doorway has a chamfered surround, a shaped lintel, and a hood mould, and the windows have pointed heads and hood moulds.	II
Barn, Spittal Farm; 54.83386°N 3.14884°W	—	Early 19th century	The barn is in sandstone with quoins and a green slate roof. It has one storey with lofts, and contains a large segmental cart entrance, a plank door, a casement window, and ventilation slits on two levels.	II
Wall and gates, Thomlinson Junior School; 54.82269°N 3.15982°W	—	Early 19th century	The low brick walls have chamfered stone coping and square rusticated stone piers with pyramidal caps. Serpentine shaped walls lead to round rusticated gate piers with urn finials. The gates are in wrought iron, and have spearheaded rails.	II
St Ursula's Convent School; 54.82614°N 3.15723°W		Early 19th century	Originally a house and later used as a school, it was extended in the late 19th century. The building is rendered on a chamfered plinth, and has pilastered quoins, a panelled string course, and a Welsh slate roof. There are two storeys and three bays, with a single-storey two-bay extension to the right. The doorway has a Tuscan porch and a decorated frieze, and the windows are sashes with stone surrounds. The rear is in sandstone, and there are round-headed staircase windows.	II
Victoria Place; 54.82252°N 3.15935°W	—	Early 19th century	A pair of stuccoed houses on a chamfered plinth, with pilasters, an eaves cornice, modillions, and a green slate roof. They have two storeys with cellars, and both houses have three bays. Each house has steps leading up to a doorway with an Ionic porch and a fanlight. The windows are sashes with wooden architraves.	II
Wall and gate piers, Wigton Hall; 54.82348°N 3.16411°W	—	Early 19th century	The wall is in front of the garden of the hall, and there are two pairs of gate piers, all in calciferous sandstone. The wall has a chamfered plinth and moulded coping. Each gate pier is octagonal and has panels carved with Gothic tracery, and an acanthus-leaf finial.	II
11–13 West Street; 54.82434°N 3.16201°W	—	c. 1830	A pair of houses with brick at the front and sandstone at the rear, No. 13 having a rendered front. They have quoins, a Cumbrian slate roof, three storeys and one bay each. The doorways have fanlights and plain entablatures, and the windows, which are sashes, have moulded surrounds. Many original features have been retained inside the houses.	II
Friends' Meeting House; 54.82410°N 3.16323°W	—	1830	The meeting house is in sandstone on a chamfered plinth with angle pilasters, a cornice and a hipped slate roof. It has one storey and a front of three bays containing sash windows with pilastered surrounds. At the sides are screen walls that have doorways with pilastered surrounds. The right doorway leads to two side entrances with a colonnade of cast iron columns. There is a two-storey single-bay extension to the right with external stone steps.	II
United Reformed Church and Manse; 54.82419°N 3.15897°W		1834	The church is in sandstone on a chamfered plinth, and has string courses and a green slate roof. There are two storeys with a cellar, and five bays. Steps lead up to doors with a fanlight with a pilastered surround and a cornice on consoles. The ground floor windows have flat heads, and those in the upper storey have round heads. Attached to the church is a manse with rendered walls, a Welsh slate roof, a door with a radial fanlight in a surround with a false keystone. The windows are sashes.	II
14 West Street; 54.82445°N 3.16226°W	—	Early or mid 19th century	A stuccoed house in a chamfered plinth, with string courses, a dentilled cornice, angle pilasters, and a green slate roof with a coped gable to the right. There are two storeys and three bays. Steps lead up to the doorway that has a Tuscan porch and a fanlight. This is flanked by triple casement windows in pilastered surrounds with pediments on console brackets. In the upper floor are sash windows in architraves with cornices.	II
4 and 6 West Street; 54.82469°N 3.16173°W	—	Mid 19th century	A house and a shop, stuccoed, with a modillioned gutter and a slate roof. There are three storeys and each part has two bays. In the ground floor are a shop front, two doorways, and a double sash window. The windows in the upper floors are sashes, those in the middle floor having ornamented hoods.	II
Market Lamp Post; 54.82492°N 3.15970°W	—	Victorian	The gas lamp post originally stood in the market place. It was moved from there in 1872, it was placed in a public park in 1924, and has since been returned to the market place. The lamp post is in cast iron, and consists of a fluted and decorated circular column on an octagonal plinth. At the top are ladder brackets and an octagonal lantern.	II
Wigton Pump; 54.82494°N 3.15976°W	—	Victorian	The pump originally stood in the market place. It was moved from there in 1872, it was placed in a public park in 1924, and has since been returned to the market place. The pump is in cast iron, and consists of a fluted tapering column with a shaped cap and a projecting nozzle. There is a handle at the rear and a bracket to support buckets. On the pump is an inscribed cast iron plate.	II
Moore Memorial Fountain; 54.82476°N 3.16127°W		1872–73	The memorial is a drinking fountain standing in the centre of Market Place. It is in polished Shap granite, and consists of a square base with fountain bowls on each side on a stepped plinth. On the sides of the base are aluminium bronze panels with 340 castings representing acts of mercy. Above the base is an egg-and-dart cornice and pediments containing medallion busts, and on top of the base is a pyramidal spire that is gilded and decorated with foliage. This is surmounted by a gilt ball and cross finial.	II
Kildare Hotel; 54.82362°N 3.16035°W	—	1887	The hotel was built as a Conservative club. It is in sandstone with a string course and a cornice, and has a green slate roof with coped gables and ball finials. There are three storeys with cellars, and two bays. The doorway has a round-headed surround with a pilastered doorcase and a dentilled cornice. Above it is a balcony on console brackets, with a wrought iron railings and French doors. To the left is a two-storey canted bay window with a parapet and a dormer window above.	II
Library block, Nelson Thomlinson School; 54.82155°N 3.15568°W	—	1896	This originated as a grammar school designed by C. J. Ferguson, and was later converted into the library wing of a comprehensive school. It is in sandstone with a green slate roof, and has two storeys and a U-shaped plan with gabled extensions. On the roof is a square wooden cupola surmounted by a pointed spire with lucarnes. The windows are mullioned, and one is large and canted. The entrance has a stone architrave.	II
War Memorial; 54.83003°N 3.17689°W		1920	The war memorial stands between two chapels in Wigton Cemetery. It consists of an obelisk in polished grey granite with a domed cap in pink granite, on a pink granite plinth with a scroll on each corner and a grey granite cap and foot. Near the top of the obelisk is a bronze wreath on each side, and the memorial stands on two square steps. On the shaft and the plinth are inscriptions and the names of those lost in the two World Wars.	II
