= Listed buildings in Waterhead, Cumberland =

Waterhead is a civil parish in the Cumberland district of Cumbria, England. It contains eight listed buildings that are recorded in the National Heritage List for England. All the listed buildings are designated at Grade II, the lowest of the three grades, which is applied to "buildings of national importance and special interest". Hadrian's Wall passes through the parish, which is mainly rural. The listed buildings are all houses, farmhouses, or farm buildings.

== Buildings ==
Name and location	Photograph	Date	Notes
High House and barn 54.98290°N 2.62024°W		1677	The farmhouse and barn have Welsh slate roofs. The house has a sandstone rear wall and a rendered front wall. There are two storeys and three bays, with a two-bay extension to the left, and a single-bay extension to the rear. The windows are casements with chamfered surrounds. The barn is at right angles to the rear; it is in stone from the Roman Wall, and contains a large cart entrance, a plank door, and ventilation slits.
Lanerton; 54.97727°N 2.62727°W		Late 17th or early 18th century	A farmhouse that was altered in the 19th century, it is in calciferous sandstone from the Roman Wall, and has a green slate roof with stepped gables. The house has two storeys and three bays, and a single-storey extension to the right with a Welsh slate roof. On the front is a gabled porch that has a doorway with a pointed arch, and the windows are chamfered and mullioned.
The Hill; 54.99488°N 2.58895°W	—	Mid 18th century	A stuccoed house on a chamfered plinth, with quoins, a moulded cornice, and a Welsh slate roof. It has two storeys and five bays. The doorway has an architrave, and the sash windows have plain surrounds; one has been converted into a French window.
Orchard House; 54.99465°N 2.57649°W		Late 18th century	The house originated as several houses providing spa accommodation, later a private house. It is in stone on a chamfered plinth, with quoins, a string course, and a hipped slate roof with overhanging eaves. The house has a central block of three storeys and five bays, with flanking bays each of two storeys and four bays. There are two doorways with moulded architraves and gabled porches on Greek Doric columns. The windows are sashes with plain surrounds, and in the right wing are casement windows in the cellar.
Spa Villa; 55.00203°N 2.57266°W	—	1815	A stone house with quoins and a hipped green slate roof. There are two storeys and six bays, with a lower two-bay extension to the right. The windows are sashes in plain surrounds. The former porch has been converted into a window, and has a segmental pediment. In the extension are segmental-arched openings.
Northrigghill; 54.97942°N 2.66705°W		1836	A farmhouse with calciferous sandstone walls and a rendered front, quoins, and a hipped green slate roof. There are two storeys and three bays. The doorway has a quoined surround and a keyed entablature, and the sash windows have plain surrounds.
Birdoswald Farmhouse; 54.98971°N 2.60315°W		1838	The farmhouse, later used for other purposes, incorporates earlier material. It is in stone, mainly rendered, with a Welsh slate roof. There are two storeys, the south front has four bays, and there is a west tower. On the front is a castellated gabled porch with a datestone. The doorway has a chamfered surround, and the windows have chamfered mullions and surrounds, and they contain sashes. The tower has two stages, and is battlemented.
Farm buildings, Birdoswald Farm; 54.98992°N 2.60353°W		c. 1858 (probable)	The farm buildings are in stone with Welsh slate roofs, they have one and two storeys, and surround a yard. The buildings include barns, stabling, and pig sties. The openings include doorways, window, and cart entrances. External steps lead to a first floor loft door.
