= Listed buildings in Bassenthwaite =

Bassenthwaite is a civil parish in the Cumberland district in Cumbria, England. It contains 21 listed buildings that are recorded in the National Heritage List for England. Of these, two are at Grade II*, the middle grade, and the others are at Grade II, the lowest grade. The parish lies to the east of Bassenthwaite Lake, it contains the village of Bassenthwaite, and is otherwise rural. Most of the listed buildings are houses or cottages with associated structures, or farmhouses and farm buildings. The other listed buildings are a church, a former chapel, and a horse engine house

== Key ==
Grade	Criteria
II*	Particularly important buildings of more than special interest
II	Buildings of national importance and special interest

== Buildings ==
Name and location	Photograph	Date	Notes	Grade
St Bega's Church; 54.64788°N 3.20014°W		Mid or late 17th century	The church was restored in 1874. It is built in calciferous sandstone, some of it medieval, with angle buttresses and quoins in sandstone, and it has a green slate roof. The church consists of a nave, a south aisle with a south vestry, and a chancel with a south chapel. On the west gable is a bellcote, and on the other gables are cross finials.	II*
Riverside Cottage; 54.67999°N 3.19563°W	—	Mid or late 17th century	The house is rendered with a green slate roof, in two storeys and three bays. The door, porch and casement windows date from the 20th century. The windows were originally mullioned, but some mullions have been removed.	II
High Side Farmhouse and barn 54.66478°N 3.18785°W	—	1668	The farmhouse and adjoining barn have a continuous green slate roof. The house is roughcast with two storeys and three bays. The doorcase has engaged columns with carved diamond capitals and an inscribed lintel under a cornice, and the windows are sashes. The barn is in rubble with flush quoins. It contains two doorways that have alternate-block surrounds and Tudor arched heads, and various other openings.	II
Mirehouse; 54.64465°N 3.19156°W		Late 17th century (probable)	The country house has been extended on a number of occasions. It is roughcast on a chamfered plinth with angle pilasters, an eaves cornice, and a green slate roof. It has two storeys and seven bays, flanked by single-bay wings, and with a drawing room extension to the right, and a three-bay servants' wing on the left. At the front is a porch with four Ionic columns. The windows are sashes with architraves, and at the rear is a Venetian stair window. In the wings are two-storey bay windows.	II*
Mire Side; 54.66597°N 3.20072°W	—	Late 17th century	A roughcast farmhouse with a green slate roof, in two storeys and three bays. The windows are fixed and have plain reveals. Inside the farmhouse is an inglenook.	II
Moss Side and former barn 54.66324°N 3.19618°W	—	Late 17th century	The former farmhouse and adjoining barn have been converted into a private house. The house was extended in the 19th century, and the barn dates from the late 18th or early 19th century. Both parts are in rubble with green slate roofs. The house has sandstone dressings, and is in two storeys with three bays. Its doorway has an alternate-block surround and a 20th-century porch, and the windows are mullioned. The barn is at right angles, and has two storeys and 20th-century windows.	II
Bowness Farmhouse and barn 54.65062°N 3.20395°W	—	1689	The farmhouse and barn are roughcast with green slate roofs. The house has two storeys and three bays, and contains sash windows. The barn to the right has a T-shaped plan, and contains various openings, including doorways, a loft opening, and triangular vents.	II
Barkbeth Farmhouse; 54.67042°N 3.17778°W	—	1700	A roughcast farmhouse with a green slate roof, in two storeys and four bays. On the front is a gabled porch, and the windows are a mix of sashes and casements.	II
Low House Farmhouse and barn 54.67877°N 3.22112°W	—	Early 18th century	The farmhouse is roughcast with a green slate roof, and has two storeys and two bays. The doorway has a porch, and the windows are mullioned. The barn is at right angles on the right, forming an L-shaped plan, and it contains a loft door and other openings.	II
Scarness Cottage; 54.66384°N 3.21064°W	—	Early 18th century	A roughcast farmhouse with a green slate roof, in two storeys and two bays. The windows are sashes, and the doorway has a plain surround. There is a fire window on the ground floor.	II
Gate piers, Scarness Dower House; 54.66465°N 3.21274°W	—	Early 18th century	The gate piers are square, and are in rusticated ashlar. Each pier has a cornice and a pyramidal cap.	II
Scarness Dower House; 54.66471°N 3.21243°W		1726	Originally a farmhouse, later a private house, it is roughcast with angle pilasters, and has a green slate roof. There are two storeys and five bays. The 20th-century door has a bolection architrave above which is a datestone. The windows are sashes in stone architraves. Inside there is an 18th-century fireplace flanked by round-headed niches.	II
Green Farmhouse; 54.67921°N 3.19510°W	—	1761	A roughcast farmhouse on a chamfered plinth, with quoins and a green slate roof. It has two storeys and three bays. The doorway has an alternate-block surround, and the windows are sashes with architraves.	II
Parkergate; 54.66216°N 3.18837°W	—	1767	Originally a farmhouse, later used as a private house, it is roughcast with a green slate roof. The house has two storeys and two bays, with an additional bay to the right. Above the doorway is a shaped inscribed lintel, and the windows are sashes.	II
Melbecks Farmhouse; 54.67640°N 3.17476°W	—	Late 18th century	A stone farmhouse with angle pilasters and a green slate roof. It has two storeys and three bays, and the windows are sashes.	II
Bassenthwaite Church Room; 54.67387°N 3.19897°W		1805	Originally a chapel, later used as a meeting room, it is in cobble rubble with quoins, stepped buttresses, and has a green slate roof. It is in a single storey and has three bays. The doorway and windows have round heads, and on the west gable is a bellcote.	II
Chapel House and Cottage; 54.67398°N 3.19928°W		Early 19th century	The house and cottage are at right angles to each other, the cottage having a lower roof. Both have green slate roofs and are in two storeys with sash windows. The house is stuccoed with sandstone dressings. It has three bays and has a porch with two Tuscan pillars. The cottage is roughcast, and has two bays.	II
North Row Farmhouse; 54.68050°N 3.20303°W	—	Early 19th century	A roughcast house with quoins and a green slate roof. It has two storeys and three bays, and contains sashes. The doorway has pilasters, impost blocks, a keystone, and a radial fanlight.	II
Barkbeth Horse Engine House; 54.67059°N 3.17760°W	—	Early to mid 19th century	The structure of the horse engine house is carried on stone pillars linked by stone walls. The building has a hipped roof of Westmorland slate, it is in one storey, and has two bays with a canted projection.	II
Armathwaite Lodge; 54.68211°N 3.22893°W	—	1873	A house in carboniferous sandstone with a string course, a parapet, and a hipped green slate roof. There are two storeys and three bays, with an additional projecting polygonal bay to the left. The doorway has a fanlight and a round-headed gabled porch. The windows are sashes, most of those in the ground floor having round arches and radial heads.	II
Armathwaite Hall Hotel; 54.68086°N 3.23265°W		1881	A country house later used as a hotel. It is in sandstone with dressings in calciferous sandstone, it has green slate roofs, and is in Tudor style. The garden front has two storeys and is flanked by three-storey battlemented towers. There is a northeast servants' wing with 2 1/2 storeys and five bays. The entrance front has a projecting bay with a Tudor arched doorway, above which is a pedimented gable containing a coat of arms. The windows are mullioned and transomed.	II
