= Listed buildings in Lazonby =

Lazonby is a civil parish in Westmorland and Furness, Cumbria, England. It contains eleven listed buildings that are recorded in the National Heritage List for England. All the listed buildings are designated at Grade II, the lowest of the three grades, which is applied to "buildings of national importance and special interest". The parish contains the village of Lazonby and the surrounding countryside. The listed buildings comprise houses, farmhouses and farm buildings, a church, a bridge, a boundary stone, a school, a railway viaduct, and a drinking trough for horses.

== Buildings ==
Name and location	Photograph	Date	Notes
Banktop House; 54.74927°N 2.70610°W	—	1617	A roughcast house with a green slate roof, two storeys, and four bays. Above the doorway is a dated plaque, the windows in the ground floor are double-sashes, and in the upper floor they are horizontally sliding sashes. The door and windows all have stone surrounds.
Townfoot Farmhouse and stables 54.75222°N 2.69878°W	—	Late 17th century (probable)	The farmhouse and stables are in sandstone with sandstone slate roofs. The house has two storeys and two bays, with two-bay stables to the right. There is a central porch, sash windows, and a fire window. Inside the farmhouse is an inglenook and a bressumer.
Eden Bridge; 54.75639°N 2.69971°W		1762	The bridge carries the B6413 road over the River Eden. It is in red sandstone, with quoins in calciferous sandstone. The bridge has four round arches, the midstream arch being the largest. There are three splayed piers that rise to form rectangular pedestrian refuges. The bridge has voussoirs, a solid parapet, two smaller dry arches on the Kirkoswald side, and a benchmark on the north parapet. The bridge is also a Scheduled Monument.
Boundary stone 54.73815°N 2.70087°W	—	Early 19th century	The stone marked the boundary between the parishes of Lazonby and Salkeld. It is in Lazonby sandstone and consists of a squared stone with the edges partly chamfered and is inscribed with the names of the parishes.
Low Plains; 54.76719°N 2.78586°W	—	Early 19th century	A stuccoed farmhouse on a chamfered plinth, with quoins and a green slate roof. There are two storeys with attics, and three bays, a two-storey single-bay wing to the left, and a two-storey two-bay wing to the rear. Semicircular steps lead up to an Ionic prostyle porch with fluted columns and a frieze. The windows are sashes in architraves, and there are false windows in the left wing, and round-arched attic windows on the sides.
Nord Vue; 54.79107°N 2.78509°W	—	Early 19th century	A roughcast farmhouse with quoins and a green slate roof. There are two storeys, three bays, and flanking recessed single-bay wings. On the front is a prostyle Tuscan porch and a door with a radial fanlight. The windows are sashes in stone surrounds.
Barn, Nord Vue; 54.79081°N 2.78505°W	—	Early 19th century	The barn is in sandstone with a green slate roof, two storeys and five bays. It contains pointed-arched doorways and loft doors, square openings, and vents.
School and schoolmaster's house 54.73815°N 2.70087°W		1863	The school and house are built in red sandstone and calciferous sandstone on a chamfered plinth, with quoins and has green slate roofs with Dutch gables. Te building consists of four components: the school house with two storeys and three bays; a three-storey bell tower with a pyramidal roof, incorporating a porch and with a classroom; a single-storey four-bay classroom and hall; and a wing with a double span wing.
St Nicholas' Church; 54.75075°N 2.70177°W		1864–66	The church was rebuilt on a medieval site by Anthony Salvin. It is built in red sandstone and calciferous sandstone on a chamfered plinth with quoins, and it has a green slate roof with coped gables and cross finials. The church consists of a nave with a south porch, a north aisle, a chancel with a north vestry, and a west tower. The tower has three stages, a stair turret rising to a higher level, a clock face on the south side, and a battlemented parapet.
Armathwaite Viaduct; 54.79858°N 2.77963°W		1875	The viaduct was built for the Settle-Carlisle Line of the Midland Railway, and is in sandstone with brick soffits. It is 176 yards (161 m) long, and consists of nine arches, each with a span of 45 feet (14 m). The piers are tapering and have imposts, there is a continuous band at the level of the track, and a solid parapet.
Drinking trough 54.73819°N 2.70098°W	—	1902	The horse drinking trough by the side of the road is in Lazonby sandstone with the trough in fire clay. It is flanked by rounded posts and has a back wall with shaped coping. In the back wall is a recessed inscribed panel.
