= Listed buildings in Nether Denton =

Nether Denton is a civil parish in the Cumberland district of Cumbria, England. It contains 14 buildings that are recorded in the National Heritage List for England. Of these, One is listed at Grade I, the highest of the three grades, and the others are at Grade II, the lowest grade. The parish contains the village of Low Row, and is otherwise rural. The listed buildings include three former fortified houses, one in ruins. The other listed buildings include houses, farmhouses and farm buildings, a former water mill, a church, and three milestones.

== Key ==
Grade	Criteria
I	Buildings of exceptional interest, sometimes considered to be internationally important
II	Buildings of national importance and special interest

== Buildings ==
Name and location	Photograph	Date	Notes	Grade
Denton Hall, barn and stables 54.96023°N 2.66005°W	—	14th century	A tower house that is almost completely enclosed by extensions carried out in 1829. The tower has thick walls of blocks of calciferous sandstone, and the extension is in a mix of red sandstone and calciferous sandstone, with quoins and a green slate roof with coped gables. The house has two storeys and three bays. The round-arched doorway has an alternate block surround, a radial fanlight, and a dated keystone. The windows are sashes with plain raised surrounds. The tower is within the house, it has three storeys, the top slightly lowered to accommodate the roof, and its interior is unaltered. Adjoining the house is a farm building with two storeys, four bays, and mullioned windows.	I
The Stonehouse; 54.95649°N 2.67061°W	—	Late 16th century	A fortified house now in ruins. It has thick walls of calciferous sandstone, probably partly from the Roman Wall. There are two storeys and three bays, and the doorway and windows have chamfered surrounds.	II
Denton Foot; 54.95441°N 2.67028°W	—	1594	Originating as a fortified house, it was extended and altered in the 19th century. The house is in sandstone, the original part having very thick walls, on a chamfered plinth, with quoins and a Welsh slate roof with coped gables. The house has two storeys, the original part has three bays, and the extension has two. The windows are sashes, those in the original part having chamfered surrounds, and in the extension the surrounds are rusticated. In the extension is a porch, and there is a re-sited dated and initialled lintel in the upper floor.	II
Denton Mill; 54.95308°N 2.66952°W	—	Late 17th or early 18th century	The former water-powered corn mill was extended in the 18th and 19th centuries. It is in calciferous sandstone, and has a Welsh slate roof with coped gables. There are two storeys and three bays, and an extension at right angles with one and two storeys.	II
Milestone; 54.95504°N 2.65539°W	—	1758 (probable)	The milestone was provided for the Carlisle to Newcastle Military Road, which later became the Carlisle to Temon Turnpike. It is in sandstone and is chamfered to give two faces. On each face is a cast iron plate inscribed with the distance in miles to Carlisle and Newcastle.	II
Milestone; 54.96072°N 2.63258°W	—	1758 (probable)	The milestone was provided for the Carlisle to Newcastle Military Road, which later became the Carlisle to Temon Turnpike. It is in sandstone and is chamfered to give two faces. On each face is a cast iron plate inscribed with the distance in miles to Carlisle and Newcastle.	II
Milestone; 54.96600°N 2.60951°W	—	1758 (probable)	The milestone was provided for the Carlisle to Newcastle Military Road, which later became the Carlisle to Temon Turnpike. It is in sandstone and is chamfered to give two faces. On each face is a cast iron plate inscribed with the distance in miles to Carlisle and Newcastle.	II
Beckstonegate and outbuildings 54.96447°N 2.64650°W	—	Mid 18th century	A farmhouse and outbuildings, later converted into a private house, it is in sandstone with a Welsh slate roof. The former farmhouse has two storeys, four bays, and a doorway that has a moulded stone architrave with a pulvinated frieze and a triangular pediment. To the right is a former outbuilding in two storeys, with a single-storey lean-to extension at the front. The windows are sashes with stone surrounds.	II
Dairy Cottages; 54.95977°N 2.64942°W	—	Late 18th century	A row of four sandstone cottages with roofs of Welsh slate and sandstone slate. They have two storeys, the three houses to the right have two bays each, and the other which is recessed and formed from two houses, has four bays and an lean-to extension on the left. The doors have quoined surrounds, and the windows, which are sashes, have rusticated surrounds.	II
Barn, Denton Hall; 54.96036°N 2.66029°W	—	Early 19th century (probable)	The barn is in sandstone and has a Welsh slate roof with coped gables. There are two storeys and two bays, and a single storey extension to the right. It contains two round-arched cart entrances, a loft door and, in the extension is a casement window.	II
Denton House; 54.95578°N 2.65146°W	—	Early 19th century	A house in calciferous sandstone on a rusticated plinth, with rusticated quoins and a hipped Welsh slate roof. There are two storeys and three bays. On the front is a projecting porch, and a doorway with a moulded surround, a pointed arch and a hood mould. The windows are sashes with rusticated surrounds and hood moulds.	II
Low Nook and outbuildings 54.97241°N 2.64629°W	—	1832	A sandstone farmhouse with quoins and a hipped slate roof. There are two storeys and three bays. The doorway has a quoined surround with a keyed entablature and a dated keystone. The windows are sashes with plain surrounds. The house is flanked by single-storey one-bay outbuildings, and there is a barn at right angles with a plank door, a loft door and ventilation slits.	II
Barn, Low Nook; 54.97233°N 2.64602°W	—	1857	The barn is in sandstone with a slate roof. There are two storeys and three bays, with a single-storey extension to the right. In the main part is a central round-arched cart entrance with impost blocks, and there are plank doors in both parts.	II
St Cuthbert's Church; 54.97440°N 2.63440°W		1868–70	The church, designed by Cory and Ferguson, is in calciferous sandstone with quoins, and a stone-slate roof with coped gables and cross finials. It consists of a nave with a south porch, and a chancel with a north vestry. On the west gable is a double bellcote. The windows are lancets with hood moulds, the east window has three lights, and there is a sundial on the porch.	II
