= Listed buildings in Kingwater =

Kingwater is a civil parish in the Cumberland district of Cumbria, England. It contains six listed buildings that are recorded in the National Heritage List for England. All the listed buildings are designated at Grade II, the lowest of the three grades, which is applied to "buildings of national importance and special interest". The parish is almost entirely rural and its listed buildings consist of farmhouses and farm buildings, a house, and a former corn mill. The parish also contains the base of RAF Spadeadam where part of a Blue Streak rocket is preserved.

== Buildings ==
Name and location	Photograph	Date	Notes
Hall Guards and barn 54.99268°N 2.64664°W	—	Late 17th century	The farmhouse and barn are in rubble with a Welsh slate roof. The house has two storeys and three bays. The doorway has a quoined surround, the sash windows have plain surrounds, and there are blocked fire windows. The barn to the left has plank doors with quoined surrounds, a loft door, and sash windows.
Clockey Mill; 54.99511°N 2.65316°W		Early 18th century	A disused water-driven corn mill that was extended in the 19th century, it is in sandstone with quoins. The roof of the original part is in stone-slate with repairs in asbestos sheet, and the extension has a slate roof. The mill has an L-shaped plan, the extension being at right angles, and an external wheel pit. There are various openings, including casement windows. Internally the roof ha an upper cruck structure.
Kingbridge Ford and outbuilding 55.00024°N 2.66164°W		1753	Originally a public house, later a private house, it is in calciferous sandstone with quoins and a Welsh slate roof. There are two storeys and three bays, and a single-storey two-bay extension to the right. The house has a gabled porch, a plank door with a quoined surround, and sash windows with rusticated surrounds. In the extension is a casement window and a garage door.
Longlands Farmhouse and adjoining ranges 55.00080°N 2.69592°W	—	1822	The farmhouse incorporates material from a 1694 house. The buildings are in stone, the house is rendered, and there is a slate roof. The house has two storeys, three bays, and an outshut. On the front is a central doorway with a porch and quoining to the right. The windows are sashes. The outbuildings are at right angles, forming an L-shaped plan. Many of the internal features of the house have been retained.
The Swaites; 54.99260°N 2.68809°W	—	1839	A stone farmhouse with a green slate roof. It has two storeys and three bays, and a single-bay extension to the right. Above the door is a fanlight, and the doorways and sash windows have plain surrounds.
Blue Streak rocket 55.02627°N 2.60331°W		1959	The booster stage of a Blue Streak rocket is preserved at RAF Spadeadam. It was made by de Havilland for the European Launcher Development Organisation as part of its Europa 1 rocket. The rocket part is made in stainless steel and is mounted on a steel handling frame.
