= Listed buildings in Setmurthy =

Setmurthy is a civil parish in the Cumberland district, Cumbria, England. It contains nine listed buildings that are recorded in the National Heritage List for England. Of these, one is listed at Grade II*, the middle of the three grades, and the others are at Grade II, the lowest grade. The parish is almost entirely rural, and the listed buildings consist of a country house and associated structures, farmhouses and farm buildings, a church, and a bridge.

== Key ==
Grade	Criteria
II*	Particularly important buildings of more than special interest
II	Buildings of national importance and special interest

== Buildings ==
Name and location	Photograph	Date	Notes	Grade
Hewthwaite Hall; 54.68342°N 3.31620°W		1581	A farmhouse in rubble with quoins and a green slate roof with coped gables. There are two storeys and three bays, and a rear extension giving an L-shaped plan. The doorway has a chamfered surround, and above it are two carved panels, one containing coats of arms, and the other an inscription. The windows in the main part of the house are cross-mullioned, those in the ground floor having three round-headed lights and hood moulds with shield stops. In the extension the windows are sashes.	II*
Low House and barn 54.67975°N 3.26521°W	—	Late 17th or early 18th century	A roughcast farmhouse with a green slate roof, it has two storeys. The windows are mixed; some are mullioned, some are horizontally sliding sashes, and others are casements, all in stone surrounds. The barn at right angles to the right is in a mixture of slate and cobble masonry.	II
Barn west of Dunthwaite; 54.68350°N 3.28347°W	—	Late 18th century	The barn is in Skiddaw slate rubble, with dressings in calciferous sandstone and a green slate roof. There are 2 1/2 storeys and four bays. The barn contains two cart entrances with segmental heads and doorways with quoined surrounds, a loft doorway, blocked pigeon holes, and ventilation slits with segmental heads.	II
Stables behind Dunthwaite; 54.68355°N 3.28289°W	—	Late 18th century	The stables are in Skiddaw slate rubble, with dressings in calciferous sandstone and a green slate roof. There are 2 1/2 storeys and three bays. External stone steps lead to a first floor doorway with a quoined surround. There is also a brick segmental-arched carriage opening.	II
Dunthwaite and barn 54.68365°N 3.28287°W	—	1785	The house and barn are roughcast with a green slate roof; The house has angle pilasters and an eaves cornice, and is in two storeys and four bays. Steps lead up to the doorway that has a stone surround and a pediment, and the windows are sashes. The barn to the right has a plank door and a loft door.	II
St Barnabas' Church; 54.67825°N 3.26609°W	—	1794	The church was restored in 1870. It is in mixed slate and cobble rubble and has a green slate roof with coped gables with cross finials. The church consists of a nave and chancel in one unit, a polygonal northwest turret and a polygonal southwest vestry.	II
Ouse Bridge; 54.67754°N 3.24275°W		Early 19th century	The bridge carries the B5291 road over the River Derwent. It is in calciferous sandstone, and consists of two segmental arches on piers with splayed cutwaters. It has solid parapets that are chamfered.	II
Higham Hall and curtain wall 54.67234°N 3.26438°W		1828	Originally a country house, it was later used for other purposes. The house is in calciferous sandstone with string courses, a battlemented parapet, angle buttresses, and a green slate roof. It has two storeys and eleven bays, and is in Gothic style. On the front is a central porch and two towers with angle turrets. The windows are sashes, those in the ground floor having square heads and hood moulds, and in the upper floor with pointed heads. At the rear are extensions that enclose a courtyard with angle turrets and a mock battlemented curtain wall.	II
Garden terrace, Higham Hall; 54.67232°N 3.26405°W	—	Mid 19th century	The terrace is to the east of the hall. It is in calciferous sandstone, and has a low wall with panelled piers with ball finials, between which are open balustrades with moulded coping. At each end are serpentine shaped seats.	II
