= Upper Denton =

Village and civil parish in Cumbria, England

Coordinates: 54.981°N 2.601°W

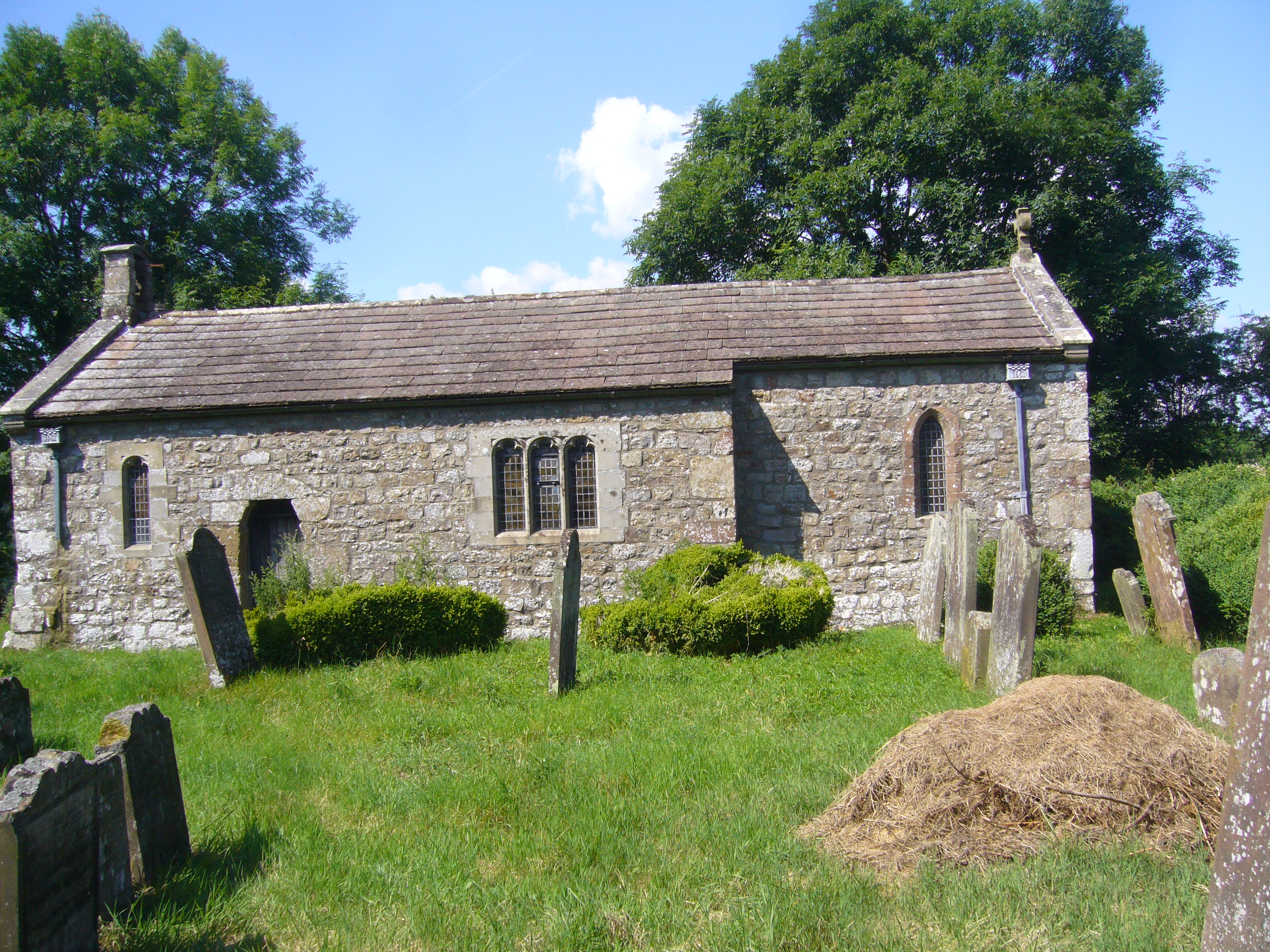
- St Cuthbert's Church, Upper Denton

- Location within Cumbria
- OS grid reference: NY616654
- Civil parish: Upper Denton
- Unitary authority: Cumberland
- Ceremonial county: Cumbria
- Region: North West
- Country: England
- Sovereign state: United Kingdom
- Post town: BRAMPTON
- Postcode district: CA8
- Dialling code: 016977
- Police: Cumbria
- Fire: Cumbria
- Ambulance: North West
- UK Parliament: Carlisle

Upper Denton is a small village and civil parish in the north of Cumbria, England, about 1 km north of the A69 road linking Haltwhistle and Brampton. The population of the civil parish when taken at the Census of 2011 was less than 100. Details are included in the parish of Nether Denton. The village is situated on the line of the Roman Stanegate road which ran from Corbridge (Coria) to Carlisle (Luguvalium). Just 1 km to the north across the river Irthing is Birdoswald fort on Hadrian's Wall. Nearby villages include Gilsland, Greenhead and Lanercost.

The church was built using Roman stones including a re-used Roman arch, believed to have been removed from Birdoswald fort across the river to the north. The old roofless Bastle house just to the east of the church was at one time a Vicarage.

An accident at the level crossing on 24 December 1970 led to a Department of the Environment report. The level crossing is staffed and not automated even though there are very few residences on the north side of the line, and the road north of the line is a dead end.

== See also ==
- Listed buildings in Upper Denton

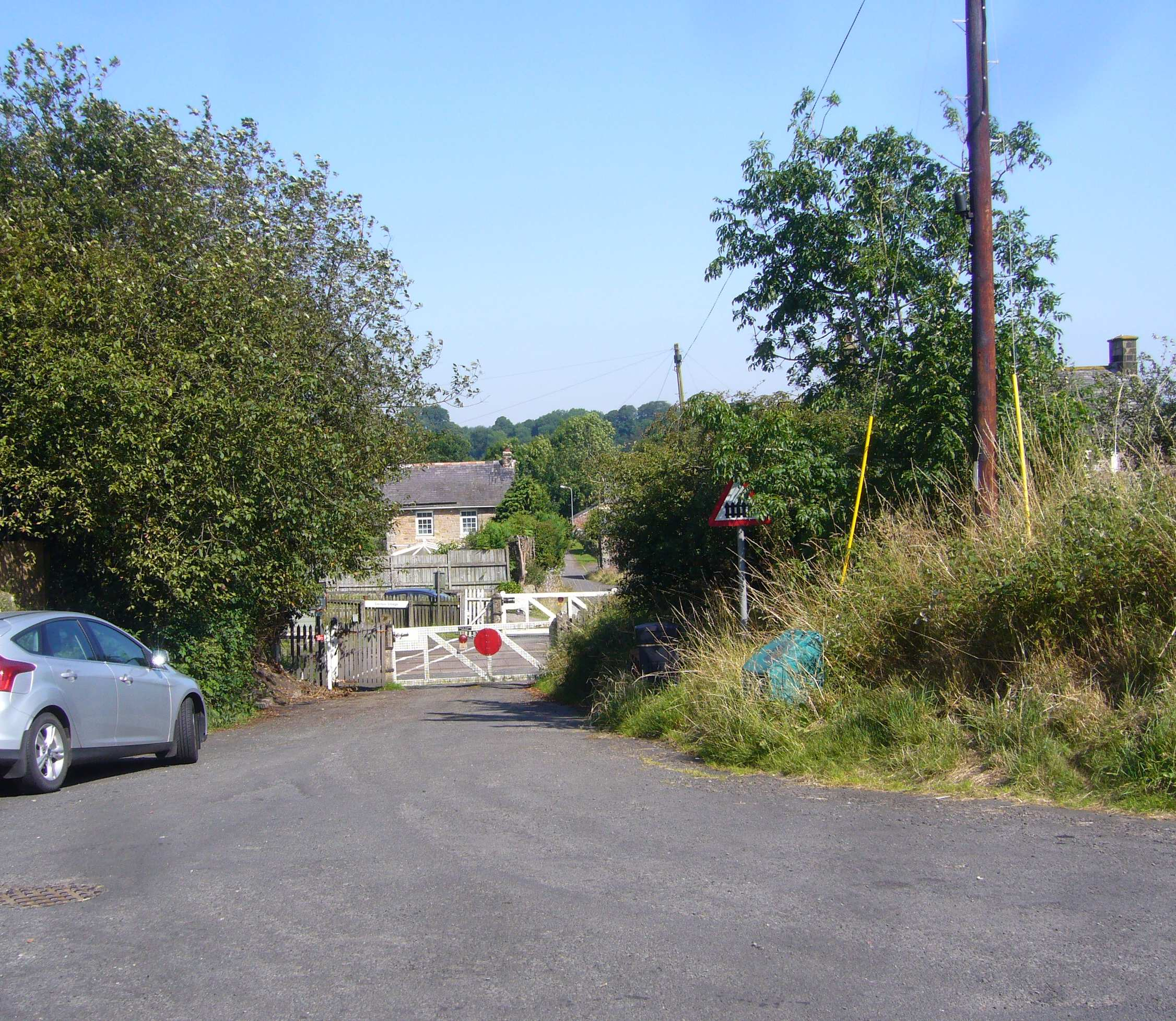
Level crossing looking north at Upper Denton.
