= Listed buildings in Lorton, Cumbria =

Lorton is a civil parish in the Cumberland district in Cumbria, England. It contains 26 listed buildings that are recorded in the National Heritage List for England. All the listed buildings are designated at Grade II, the lowest of the three grades, which is applied to "buildings of national importance and special interest". The parish contains the villages of High Lorton and Low Lorton, and is otherwise rural, Most of the listed buildings are houses and associated structures, or farmhouses and farm buildings. The other listed buildings include a bridge and a church.

== Buildings ==
Name and location	Photograph	Date	Notes
Lorton Hall and Winder House; 54.61984°N 3.31347°W		Mid or late 15th century	Originally a tower house with a wing, later converted into two dwellings. The wing dates from the 16th century, and there were further alterations in 1663, 1880 and 1904. The building is in slate rubble, partly rendered, with a green slate roof. The tower has three storeys and two bays, the rear 19th-century extension has two storeys and three bays, and the wing has two storeys and seven bays. The tower contains windows of varying types, some with Tudor arched heads, some mullioned and transomed, and it has a battlemented parapet. The wing has a continuous hood mould and windows with separate pediments.
Lambfold and former stable 54.62080°N 3.30189°W	—	Mid 17th century	The building, which is stuccoed with a green slate roof, was extended in the 19th century and altered in the 20th century. The house has two bays and three storeys, to the right is a higher two-storey, two-bay extension, and to the left is a lower two-storey, three-bay stable. Most of the windows in the house are sashes, and at the rear of the original house are casement windows. The stable has casement windows, one a dormer, and on the left return is a Venetian window above a garage door.
Home Cottage and barn 54.62125°N 3.31420°W	—	1666	Originally a farmhouse and barn, later converted into a private house, it has a green slate roof. The house is stuccoed with projecting plinth stones, and has two storeys and four bays. The windows are sashes, some in original chamfered surrounds, and above the door is a gabled hood. The barn at right-angles to the right is in slate rubble, and contains doorway of varying types. Inside the house is an inglenook.
Midtown; 54.61913°N 3.30076°W	—	1678	A farmhouse, later converted into a private dwelling, in mixed slate rubble with a green slate roof. It has two storeys, four bays, and a rear extension. The doorway has an architrave and an inscribed lintel, and it is flanked by a mullioned window on the left, and a sash window on the right; the latter has a round head and a dated surround. Above the openings is a continuous hood mould.
Scales Farm Cottage; 54.61638°N 3.29197°W	—	1688	A former farmhouse in rendered rubble on boulder foundations, with a roof of Westmorland slate. It has two storeys and two bays. The windows are mullioned, but some mullions have been slot. Inside the house is a bressumer.
Lorton Bridge; 54.61863°N 3.31449°W	—	1722	Originally a farmhouse, later a private house, it is roughcast with quoins, an eaves cornice, and a green slate roof. There are two storeys, three bays, and sash windows with the remains of mullions. The doorway has an open stone porch with a segmental hood, and above the door is a fanlight.
New Farmhouse and barn 54.60364°N 3.30759°W	—	Early 18th century	The building was extended in 1741 and in the 19th century. It is roughcast with a green slate roof. The house has two storeys and three bays with quoins on the left corner, and a gabled porch containing side seats. There is one remaining mullioned window, the other windows being sashes. The barn to the right has a large cart entrance.
Boonbeck Farmhouse and barn 54.61761°N 3.29951°W	—	1733	The farmhouse and barn are in roughcast slate rubble with green slate roofs. The house has two storeys and two bays, a door with an inscribed lintel, and sash windows. The barn is at right-angles to the right, and has doorways and other openings, including pigeon holes.
Scales and barn 54.61637°N 3.29162°W		Mid 18th century	A farmhouse and barn that are in rubble. The house has a green slate roof, two storeys and three bays. The door has a fanlight, and the windows are sashes. The L-shaped barn has been partly incorporated into the house. It has a corrugated iron roof, and the further part contains a large cart entrance, a doorway and a loft door.
Kent Cottage; 54.61899°N 3.30070°W	—	Late 18th century	The cottage incorporates some elements from an earlier building, It is rendered with a slate roof, and has two storeys, two bays, and a rear outshut. In the centre is a gabled porch, and at the rear is a mullioned window, the other windows being sashes.
Rose Cottage; 54.62007°N 3.30159°W	—	Late 18th century	A stuccoed house with a green slate roof in two storeys and two bays. The central doorway has an architrave and the windows are sashes.
Corner House; 54.61818°N 3.29997°W	—	Late 18th or early 19th century	A pebbledashed house in slate rubble with a green slate roof. It has two storeys, two bays, and a small kitchen extension. The windows are sashes.
Yew Tree Hall; 54.61766°N 3.30054°W		Late 18th or early 19th century	Originally a malthouse, this has been converted in a village hall. It is in slate rubble, with quoins in calciferous sandstone, the rear wall is partly slate-hung, the building is partly rendered, and it has a green slate roof. There are two storeys and a basement, and six bays. The hall contains various doorways, and casement windows.
Boonbeck Bridge; 54.61778°N 3.30002°W	—	Early 19th century	The bridge carries a road over Whit Beck. It is in split slate rubble, and consists of a single segmental arch with solid parapets.
Corner Cottage, Nutshell and Yan Yak; 54.61804°N 3.29999°W		Early 19th century	Originally a brewery, later divided into three cottages. They are in pebbledashed slate rubble with green slate roofs, and have two storeys and a high basement. Corner Cottage has two bays, and the other cottages have three. The doorways have porches that are approached by flights of parallel stone steps. There are also basement doors, and the windows are of varying types.
Stable behind Corner Cottage and Nutshell; 54.61805°N 3.29976°W	—	Early 19th century	The building is in slate rubble with quoins and a green slate roof. There are two storeys and four bays, with a lower two-bay extension to the right. The main part contains two segmental-arched cart entrances, two loading doors, and a small opening. In the extension are three doorways and sash windows.
Lorton Park; 54.62084°N 3.30259°W	—	Early 19th century	A stuccoed house with an eaves cornice, a parapet, angle pilasters, and a green slate roof. It has two storeys, an entrance front of three bays, five bays on the front facing the road, and a tower wing. The doorway is round-headed, and it is flanked by canted bay windows. The windows are sashes with architraves, and the tower wing has a hipped roof.
Garden wall and gateway, Lorton Park; 54.62072°N 3.30225°W	—	Early 19th century	The wall is stuccoed and has saddleback coping. It contains a taller gateway in rusticated ashlar with a round-headed doorway above which is a cornice and a lion.
Gate piers and walls, Lorton Park; 54.62047°N 3.30205°W	—	Early 19th century	The main gate piers are rectangular and stuccoed and are surmounted by lion finials. From them, serpentine walls lead to smaller square end piers. The walls are stuccoed and have saddleback coping.
Smoke house, Lorton Park; 54.62143°N 3.30359°W	—	Early 19th century	The former smoke house is in slate rubble and cobble with sandstone dressings. It is a small circular single-storey building with modillioned battlements, partly in ruin. There is a doorway with brick reveals and a stone lintel.
Lorton Park Cottage; 54.62098°N 3.30278°W	—	Early 19th century	The cottage is roughcast on a chamfered plinth, and has a green slate roof with ornamental ridge tiles. There are two storeys and three bays, with a carriage entrance to the right. On the front are two gabled porches with bargeboards and finials. The windows are casements with chamfered surrounds and hood moulds. The carriage entrance has a segmental arch with a quoined surround.
Oak Hill; 54.62236°N 3.30356°W	—	Early 19th century	A stuccoed house with eaves modillions, angle pilasters, and a hipped green slate roof. It has two storeys and three bays, with a lower two-storey, two-bay wing at the rear. The doorway has a fanlight and a cornice on brackets. This is flanked by canted bay windows, the other windows being sashes with bracketed cornices.
Park Cottages and Wayside Cottage; 54.62157°N 3.30339°W	—	Early 19th century	A row of three roughcast cottages with a green slate roof. They have two storeys, the central cottage has one bay, and the others have two. There is a decorative eaves board, and each cottage has a gabled porch with decorative bargeboards and finials. The windows are casements with hood moulds.
Summerhouse, Lorton Park; 54.62030°N 3.30284°W	—	c. 1830	The summer house is in yellow brick, with a band of red brick at eaves level, an ogee lead roof, and a copper ball finial. It has an octagonal plan, is in a single storeys, and has a buttress in each corner. The windows have pointed heads, and the doorway has an architrave. Inside are fixed benches and a central table.
Methodist Church; 54.62033°N 3.30180°W	—	1840	The Methodist church is rendered and has a green slate roof. It is in one storey and has two bays. There is a central gabled porch flanked by casement windows in round-headed surrounds, and above the porch is an inscribed plaque.
Fountain, Lorton Hall; 54.61992°N 3.31328°W	—	Late 19th century	The fountain is in calciferous sandstone. It has a base of four segmental bowls. The fountain head consists of scrolled brackets and carved lion heads.
