= Listed buildings in Sebergham =

Sebergham is a civil parish in the Cumberland district, Cumbria, England. It contains 33 listed buildings that are recorded in the National Heritage List for England. Of these, four are listed at Grade II*, the middle of the three grades, and the others are at Grade II, the lowest grade. The parish contains the village of Sebergham and the hamlet of Welton, and is otherwise rural. Most of the listed buildings are houses and associated structures, farmhouses and farm buildings. The other listed buildings include a medieval church, former mills, bridges, and a boundary stone.

== Key ==
| Grade | Criteria |
|---|---|
| II* | Particularly important buildings of more than special interest |
| II | Buildings of national importance and special interest |

== Buildings ==
| Name and location | Photograph | Date | Notes | Grade |
|---|---|---|---|---|
| St Mary's Church; 54.76752°N 2.98992°W | | Medieval | The church is in Early English style, the tower was added in 1825, and the church was restored in 1880 and 1905. It is in sandstone and has a green slate roof with coped gables. The church consists of a nave and a chancel in one unit, and a west tower incorporating a porch. The tower is in three stages, its entrance has an alternate-block surround and voussoirs, external steps lead to a first floor door, and there is an embattled parapet with pinnacles. Inside the church is a three-light oriel window over the west door. | II* |
| Courtyard range, gatehouse and barn, Warnell Hall; 54.76265°N 3.01066°W | — | Early 16th century (probable) | Originally part of a fortified courtyard range, the buildings are in sandstone rubble with roofs of Welsh slate and sandstone slate. The gatehouse is higher, and contains a segmental through arch with internal niches. Its upper floor is corbelled out, and has a three-light round-headed mullioned window. The barn contains original 16th-century window openings. | II* |
| Warnell Hall; 54.76271°N 3.01090°W | — | Early or mid-16th century | Originally a fortified house, later a farmhouse, it incorporates part of a 14th-century tower. The house is in calciferous and pink sandstone, and has a green slate roof. It has two storeys, five bays, a stair projection to the rear, and a single-story rear extension dating probably from the 18th century. The doorway has an alternate-block surround, a cornice, and a voussoir frieze. The windows are mullioned, some with cornices, and some with hood moulds. | II* |
| Woodshed, Bridge End; 54.76777°N 2.99978°W | — | Early or mid-17th century | Originally a house, later used as an outbuilding, and reduced from two storeys to one. It is in sandstone rubble with a roof mainly of Welsh slate and partly of sandstone slate. It has one storey and three bays. The central doorway has a Tudor arched lintel, to the right is a chamfered mullioned window with a hood mould, and to the left is a 20th-century window and entrance. Inside the building is a pair of upper crucks. | II |
| Bellbridge Farmhouse; 54.77878°N 2.98989°W | — | Mid-17th century | The farmhouse was extended to the rear in the late 17th century. The house is rendered with quoins, an eaves cornice, and a Welsh slate roof. There are two storeys, and both parts have three bays. The older part has a doorway with a bolection architrave and a swan-neck pediment containing a carved stone coat of arms, and the windows are cross-mullioned. The later part has a door with a chamfered surround and a hood mould. There are some original small windows, and the others are 20th-century casements. There is a single-storey extension to the right with a stone slate roof. | II |
| Barn, Fellhill Farm; 54.76079°N 3.02477°W | — | 17th century (probable) | A field barn in rubble with quoins, it has a stone slate roof with coped gables. The openings include a square-headed doorway with a wooden lintel, narrow ventilation slits, and an owl hole. | II |
| Shippon, Fellhill Farm; 54.76071°N 3.02499°W | — | 1668 | The shippon is in mixed rubble with quoins, and it has a stone slate roof with coped gables. There are two low storeys, three bays, and slim ventilation slits. The western bay contains a square doorway with a moulded surround, an inscribed lintel, and a hood mould. There is also a loading doorway with chamfered jambs. In the eastern bay is a doorway with a plain surround and two rectangular chamfered windows. | II |
| Gateposts, Bellbridge Farmhouse; 54.77889°N 2.98996°W | — | Late 17th century | The gateposts are in stone. Each consists of a rusticated pier on a chamfered plinth, with a cornice and a ball finial. | II |
| Sebergham Hall; 54.77287°N 2.99062°W | — | Late 17th century | A country house in calciferous and pink sandstone on a chamfered plinth, with quoins, an eaves cornice, and a green slate roof with coped gables. It has two storeys, the main part having five bays, and with a lower three-bay extension to the right. The doorway has a bolection architrave, a carved leaf frieze, and a broken segmental pediment on console brackets. Most of the windows are sashes; those in the ground floor of the main part of the house have alternate triangular and segmental broken pediments. In the extension and at the rear are dated and inscribed lintels. | II* |
| Sowerby Mill; 54.76450°N 3.00052°W | — | Late 17th century | Originally the miller's house with an attached stable, later a private house. It is in sandstone rubble with a green slate roof. There are two storeys, the original house had three bays, with a two-bay stable to the left. The windows are mullioned and contain 20th-century casements. Inside the house are an inglenook and a bressumer. An oak framed garden room, merging with the house's catslide roof, was added to the north west corner in 2017. | II |
| The Kennels, The Kennels Cottage and barns 54.78917°N 3.00603°W | — | 1682 | A row of two houses and barns, The Kennels Cottage dating from the 18th century. They are in rendered sandstone, the houses have Welsh slate roofs, and the barn has a corrugated asbestos roof. On the right, The Kennels Cottage has two storeys, three bays and one casement window, the other windows being sashes. To the left is a barn with a blank front. Further to the left is The Kennels, with two storeys, three bays, an entrance with a moulded surround and a shaped lintel, partly cut away. To the left of this is an angled barn with a similar entrance and a shaped, dated lintel. At the rear is a large cart entrance. | II |
| Byres, Bellbridge Farm; 54.77902°N 2.99005°W | — | 1688 | The building originated as a house with an attached barn. It is in sandstone rubble, with a roof mainly of Welsh slate and with some sandstone slate. The former house has two storeys and two bays with the barn to the right, and there is a single-storey extension at right angles giving an L-shaped plan. In the house is a doorway with a dated and inscribed lintel, casement windows with chamfered surrounds and a continuous hood mould in the ground floor, and mullioned windows and a loft door above. In the former barn are doorways, ventilation slits, and a loft door. The extension is partly in brick and incorporates a former gate pier with a ball finial. | II |
| Lanehead and barns 54.78200°N 2.99412°W | — | 1688 | The farmhouse and barns are in sandstone rubble, and they have roofs mainly of green slate and some sandstone slate, with coped gables. The barns date from the late 18th or early 19th century. The house has two storeys, three bays, and a lower earlier rendered single bay to the right. The doorway has a bolection architrave and a cornice, and the windows are sashes, some of which are horizontally sliding. The barns are to the rear, in an L-shape, forming an overall U-shaped plan. They contain doorways with segmental arches and a through cart entrance. | II |
| Sebergham Bridge; 54.76743°N 3.00040°W | | 1689 | The bridge carries the B5305 road over the River Caldew. It is in sandstone, and consists of two segmental arches on a central pier with splayed cutwaters. The bridge has solid parapets with chamfered coping and end piers. | II |
| Greenfoot and former barn 54.76964°N 3.00052°W | — | 1715 | The house and former barn incorporate an earlier house of 1687. The main part is rendered on a chamferde plinth with a green slate roof; the older part is in sandstone rubble with a roof of Welsh, green, and sandstone slate. The house has two storeys, the main part is in a double span with five bays, the older part is to the right, and the former barn is at right angles, giving an L-shaped plan. The doorway has an architrave and an open segmental pediment, and the windows are casements with chamfered surrounds. At the rear of the barn is a doorway with a re-set dated lintel. | II |
| Borrans Hill Farmhouse and barn 54.79126°N 2.99584°W | — | 1716 | The barn was extended in the late 18th century. The farmhouse and barn are in sandstone rubble. The house has a roof mainly of green slate with some sandstone slate. There are two storeys, two bays, and a doorway with a chamfered surround and an inscribed and dated lintel. Some of the windows are mullioned containing 20th-century casements, there is a blocked fire window, and a horizontally sliding sash window. The barn has a sandstone slate roof, and its extension has a Welsh slate roof. It contains plank doors, ventilation slits, loft doors, small windows, and a large projecting cart entrance. | II |
| Floshfield and adjoining barn 54.76645°N 2.98917°W | — | Early 18th century | The house is roughcast with a roof mainly of Welsh slate and partly of sandstone slate. It has two storeys and four bays, and contains sash windows with stone surrounds, some also with cornices. The doorway has a bolection architrave with a cornice. The barn to the left is in sandstone rubble with a corrugated asbestos roof, a cart entrance with alternate-block surround, another entrance, a casement window, and a smaller window. | II |
| Ling and barn 54.79847°N 3.01636°W | — | Early 18th century | The farmhouse is in rendered sandstone with an eaves cornice and a Welsh slate roof. It has two storeys, three bays, and sash windows in stone surrounds. To the right is a lower barn in sandstone rubble with a sandstone slate roof. There are external stone steps to a first floor loft door. | II |
| Brow Top Farmhouse and barns 54.76787°N 2.99958°W | — | 1730 | The house incorporates part of a 17th-century house. The house and barns are roughcast. The house is on a chamfered plinth, and has quoins, an eaves cornice, and a green slate roof with coped gables. Some windows are mullioned, and others have been replaced by sashes. The doorway has a bolection surround with a keystone, a frieze, and a fanlight. The barns have sandstone slate roofs and, with the house, form a U-shaped plan, and inside is a pair of upper crucks. Inside the house is an inglenook and a bressumer. | II |
| Bridge End; 54.76789°N 2.99957°W | — | 1737 | The house incorporates part of a 1670 house, but this has been much rebuilt. The house is in sandstone with quoins, and it has a sandstone slate roof with coped gables. There are two storeys, the 1737 part has three bays, and the 1670 part has two. There is also a single-storey extension at right angles at the front dating probably from the 17th century. Many of the windows are mullioned, and others date from the 20th century. There is a dated and inscribed lintel that has been moved from its original position. Inside the 1737 part is an inglenook and a bressumer. | II |
| Limetree Grove; 54.76576°N 2.99348°W | — | 1761 | A roughcast farmhouse with quoins and a Welsh slate roof. It has two storeys, three bays, and sash windows in stone surrounds. The doorway has an alternate-block surround, a dated keystone, and a fanlight. | II |
| Churchtown Farmhouse; 54.76607°N 2.98886°W | — | 1769 | The farmhouse was extended in the late 18th century. It is rendered with quoins and a green slate roof. There are two storeys and three bays, with a lower two-storey single-bay extension to the left. The doorway has an architrave and a triangular pediment. The windows are sashes with stone surrounds, some are double, and the window above the doorway has an architrave. | II |
| Bell Bridge; 54.77789°N 2.98728°W | | 1772 | The bridge carries a road over the River Caldew. It was a hump-backed sandstone bridge, and consisted of a single segmental arch. The bridge had a solid parapet with chamfered coping. It collapsed and was swept away by the River Caldew during the passing of the remnants of Storm Jonas on 27 January 2016. It had previously been damaged by Storm Desmond in December 2015. The replacement bridge, incorporating stone from its predecessor, was opened to the public on 19 December 2017. | II |
| Barn, Bellbridge Farm; 54.77893°N 2.98939°W | — | 1774 | The barn is in sandstone rubble with a sandstone slate roof. There is a central cart entrance with a segmental arch and an alternate-block surround, and two levels of ventilation slits. The doorway has a dated lintel. Incorporated into a 20th-century brick extension is a re-used late 17th-century gate pier with a ball finial. | II |
| Lonning Foot; 54.76847°N 3.00370°W | — | Late 18th century | A house in sandstone rubble with a roof mainly of green slate and some Welsh slate. There are two storeys and two bays, with a long single-storey extension to the right. The windows are sashes in stone surrounds, and the doorway has a pilastered surround with a false keystone, and a fanlight. | II |
| Sebergham Castle, barn and stable 54.78106°N 3.04304°W | — | Late 18th century | A farmhouse later divided into two dwellings, with flanking farm buildings, all with green slate roofs. The house is rendered on a chamfered plinth, with string courses and a battlemented parapet. The house has two storeys and three bays. The doorway and the ground floor casement windows have ogee heads, and in the upper floor are mullioned with hood moulds. The house is flanked by battlemented screen walls containing ogee-headed doorways. At the ends of the walls are gabled wings at right-angles with ball finials, one a barn, the other a stable. | II |
| Brisco House; 54.76599°N 2.99624°W | — | Late 18th or early 19th century | A roughcast brick house on a stone plinth with a green slate roof. There are two storeys, two bays, and sash windows with stone sills and keystones. The doorway has a pilastered surround and a pediment. | II |
| Crookholme Mill; 54.78241°N 2.99081°W | — | Late 18th or early 19th century | A former water mill in mixed sandstone rubble and cobbles on a chamfered plinth, with sandstone quoins and a hipped green slate roof. There are two storeys and two bays in an L-shape, with another bay to the left. Steps lead up to the doorway in a loading porch, and the windows are casements. There is a wheelhouse to the right containing the remains of an undershot wheel and much of the internal machinery. | II |
| Byres, Floshfield; 54.76646°N 2.98891°W | — | Late 18th or early 19th century | The byres are in sandstone rubble with a corrugated asbestos roof, and have two storeys and two bays. The openings include plank doors in stone surrounds, a casement window with a sash window above it, and a loft door. | II |
| Sowerby Mill House; 54.76427°N 3.00045°W | — | Late 18th or early 19th century | Originally a water mill, later a private house, it is in sandstone rubble with quoins and a tile roof. There are two storeys and five bays, the right bay being gabled and forming an L-shaped plan. There are external stone steps leading to a first floor doorway. The doors and windows date from the 20th century. At the end of the right wall is an external mill wheel, and inside the end bay is complete mill machinery. | II |
| Welton Farmhouse and barn 54.78938°N 3.00758°W | — | Late 18th or early 19th century | The farmhouse is stuccoed with quoins. and it has a green slate roof with coped gables. There are two storeys and three bays. The doorway has a Tuscan doorcase with a pediment and a radial fanlight. To the left is a lower two-storey house extension and barn in sandstone rubble, partly stuccoed, and with a roof mainly of Welsh slate, and partly of sandstone slate. The windows are sashes in stone surrounds. | II |
| Boundary stone 54.77894°N 3.02716°W | — | Early 19th century (probable) | The boundary stone is in calciferous sandstone. It consists of an irregular square with an inscription on the front reading "SEBERGHAM HIGH" and an illegible inscription on the back. | II |
| Bridge Cottage; 54.76744°N 2.99952°W | — | Early 19th century | A sandstone house with quoins and a green slate roof. It has two storeys and two bays, with a lower single-bay extension to the right, and a brick outhouse to the left. There is a gabled porch with fretwork decoration, and a doorway with a pilastered surround and a fanlight. The windows are sashes with stone surrounds. The openings in the outhouse have pointed heads. | II |
