= Listed buildings in Solport =

Solport is a civil parish in the Cumberland district of Cumbria, England. It contains two listed buildings that are recorded in the National Heritage List for England. Both the listed buildings are designated at Grade II, the lowest of the three grades, which is applied to "buildings of national importance and special interest". The parish is entirely rural, and the listed buildings consist of a house with a barn, and a redundant Quaker meeting house.

== Buildings ==
Name and location	Photograph	Date	Notes
Friar Hill Gate and barn 55.05003°N 2.80995°W	—	Late 17th or early 18th century	The house and barn are built in a mix of red sandstone and calciferous sandstone, and have a Welsh slate roof. The house has a single storey with an attic, it has four bays, and the barn is to the right, with a lower roof line. The doorway has a plain surround, and the casement windows have chamfered stone surrounds. In the barn are garage doors, and ventilation slits on two levels.
Thornyland Quaker Meeting House and stable 55.05655°N 2.85025°W	—	1773	The former Quaker meeting house is rendered with sandstone quoins and a hipped slate roof. It is in a single storey with three bays and a stable extension to the right. The doorway has a plain surround and a segmental head, and the casement windows have quoined surrounds and segmental heads. In an end wall is a re-used datestone.
