= Papcastle =

Village and civil parish in Cumbria, England

Coordinates: 54.6700°N 3.3807°W

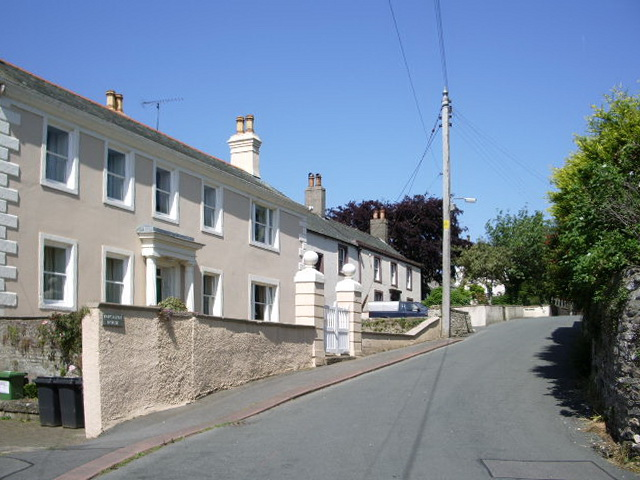
- Papcastle House

- Location in Allerdale, Cumbria Location within Cumbria
- Population: 385 (2011)
- OS grid reference: NY109315
- Civil parish: Papcastle
- Unitary authority: Cumberland
- Ceremonial county: Cumbria
- Region: North West
- Country: England
- Sovereign state: United Kingdom
- Post town: COCKERMOUTH
- Postcode district: CA13
- Dialling code: 01900
- Police: Cumbria
- Fire: Cumbria
- Ambulance: North West
- UK Parliament: Penrith and Solway

Papcastle is a village and civil parish in the district of Cumberland in the English county of Cumbria. The village is now effectively a northern extension of Cockermouth, which lies to the south of the River Derwent. It has its own parish council and lies within Bridekirk Parish for Church of England purposes. In 2001 it had a population of 406, reducing to 385 at the 2011 Census.

The name of Papcastle is said to be a compound formed from Old Norse and Old English papi+cæster, meaning 'the Roman fort inhabited by a hermit'.

== Remains of Roman Derventio ==
It has been known for some time that there was a Roman presence at Papcastle. It was the site of a Roman fort called Derventio, which was originally built in timber and rebuilt in stone. There was also a civilian settlement (vicus). The remains of the forts and part of the vicus were designated an ancient monument in 1992. More parts of the vicus were excavated from Sibby Brows field and the house of the Buckinghams in the village itself, during an episode of British archaeological TV programme Time Team in 1999. The major flood of 2009 led to the discovery of Roman remains on the south side of the River, including well-preserved foundations of a watermill. This led to a three-year archaeological programme on both sides of the river, finding several bathhouse phases, mansio, and eventually the remains of the bridge. A short account of these discoveries over 4 years is available from Grampus Heritage and Training, Threapland, Bothel, Cumbria. The full text, as well as that of "Papcastle History" is available on the village website (http://www.papcastle.org.uk.)

== Village hall ==
Papcastle Village Hall was built as a reading room for men only in 1895, donated by local resident, Honora Wybergh, who lived at The Mount, a large house demolished in the 1960s to make way for the modern Mount housing estate. Originally run by trustees, a new management scheme set up in 1940 by the Charity Commission is still in force. The hall is run by the Council of Management (Trustees). The hall has gone through several phases of popularity and decline. In 2006 it underwent major refurbishment with the help of major grants from a number of local organisations.

== Bus Services ==
Stagecoach Cumbria operates a bus service, numbered the 600, which connects Papcastle with Cockermouth, Wigton and Carlisle. The service operates between Monday and Saturday and stops just outside the village, on the A5086. There is also a number of buses from Cockermouth town centre, including routes to Keswick and Penrith. See separate article.

== See also ==
- Listed buildings in Papcastle
