= Sebergham =

Coordinates: 54.767°N 2.999°W

- Village
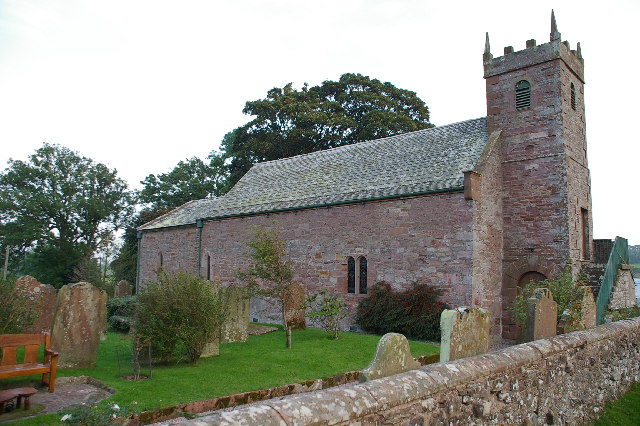
- St Mary's Church, Sebergham

- Location in the former Allerdale borough Location within Cumbria
- Population: 365 (2011)
- OS grid reference: NY357418
- Civil parish: Sebergham
- Unitary authority: Cumberland
- Ceremonial county: Cumbria
- Region: North West
- Country: England
- Sovereign state: United Kingdom
- Post town: CARLISLE
- Postcode district: CA5
- Dialling code: 016974
- Police: Cumbria
- Fire: Cumbria
- Ambulance: North West
- UK Parliament: Penrith and Solway

Sebergham is a village and civil parish in the Cumberland district, in the ceremonial county of Cumbria, England. It is located on the B5305, south of Carlisle and south-east of Wigton. The civil parish population at the 2011 Census was 365. The parish includes Welton.

St Mary's Church is medieval in origin, repaired in the 18th century and with a tower added in the 1820s. It is a Grade II* listed building and lies on the Cumbria Way walk. The parish formed part of Inglewood Forest. Sebergham Bridge dates from 1689 and Bell Bridge dated from 1772: both were Grade II listed. Bell Bridge collapsed and was swept away by the River Caldew during the passing of the remnants of Storm Jonas on 27 January 2016. It had previously been damaged by Storm Desmond in December 2015. The replacement Bell Bridge, incorporating stone from its Georgian predecessor, was opened to the public on 19 December 2017.

Sebergham Castle is a farmhouse, formerly known as Colerigg Hall, transformed in the Gothic Revival style in the late eighteenth century. A mile to the south-west of the village is Warnell Hall, a fortified house which is now a farmhouse. It was built in the 16th century incorporating part of a 14th-century pele tower.

== Governance ==
Sebergham is in the parliamentary constituency of Penrith and Solway.

From 1974 until 2023 it was in Allerdale district, since 1 April 2023, Sebergham is administered by Cumberland unitary authority.

== See also ==
- Listed buildings in Sebergham
