= Listed buildings in Upper Denton =

Upper Denton is a civil parish in the Cumberland district of Cumbria, England. It contains ten buildings that are recorded in the National Heritage List for England. Of these, one is listed at Grade I, the highest of the three grades, two are at Grade II*, the middle grade, and the others are at Grade II, the lowest grade. Hadrian's Wall (the Roman Wall) passes through the parish, and a stretch of the wall is listed. Many of the buildings are constructed from stone taken from the wall, and one listed building, Willowford and its attached farm buildings, is built between the wall and its vallum. Two of the listed buildings originated as bastle houses, and the other listed buildings comprise farmhouses, farm buildings, houses, a redundant church, and a railway bridge.

== Key ==
Grade	Criteria
I	Buildings of exceptional interest, sometimes considered to be internationally important
II*	Particularly important buildings of more than special interest
II	Buildings of national importance and special interest

== Buildings ==
Name and location	Photograph	Date	Notes	Grade
Roman Wall; 54.98934°N 2.57528°W	—	124–130	Part of Hadrian's Wall, it is faced in calciferous sandstone with rubble infill. This section of the wall is about 200 metres (660 ft) long, and is up to five courses high. It is also a scheduled monument.	I
Upper Denton Church; 54.98273°N 2.60213°W		Early 12th century (probable)	The church was restored in 1881 by C. J. Ferguson, and again in the 1930s, and has been redundant since the 1970s. It is built in calciferous sandstone from the Roman Wall, and has quoins, and a stone-slate roof with coped gables. The church consists of a two-bay nave and a one-bay chancel. On the west gable is a bellcote, and the chancel arch is Roman. It is also a scheduled monument.	II*
Old Vicarage; 54.98291°N 2.60173°W	—	Late 16th century (probable)	Before it was a vicarage, this was a bastle house, and is now a ruin. It has thick walls in calciferous sandstone from the Roman Wall, with quoins, coped gables, and dressings in red sandstone. There is no roof. The building has two storeys and a single bay. There are doorways and windows, some of which have collapsed. It is also a scheduled monument.	II
Temon and outbuilding 54.96752°N 2.59982°W	—	Late 16th century	The outbuilding originated as a bastle house, and has thick walls of calciferous sandstone, some probably from the Roman Wall. It has dressings in red sandstone, a corrugated asbestos roof, two storeys and three bays. It contains a round-arched cart entrance, a loft entrance, and windows with chamfered surrounds. The farmhouse dates from the late 17th century, and was altered in 1730. It is on a chamfered plinth, and has quoins, a moulded cornice, a Welsh slate roof, two storeys and four bays. There is a doorway with a moulded architrave, a false keystone, a frieze, and a segmental pediment, and the windows are casements. The front facing the road is rendered, and has a prostyle Ionic porch with a moulded entablature and a triangular pediment, a doorway with a pilastered surround, and sash windows.	II*
1–4 Hall Terrace; 54.99107°N 2.57505°W	—	Late 17th century)	Originally an inn, it was converted into a row of four houses in the late 19th century. The houses are in calciferous sandstone, partly from the Roman Wall, and have roofs of Welsh slate with coped gables. There are two storeys and each house has two bays. Some windows have been blocked, some are mullioned, and most are sashes.	II
Dinmont House; 54.99138°N 2.57486°W	—	Late 17th century (probable)	A house in calciferous sandstone, partly from the Roman Wall, and it has a green slate roof with coped gables. There are two storeys and three bays. The doorway and sash windows have plain surrounds, and above the door is a fanlight.	II
Denton Farmhouse; 54.98172°N 2.60088°W	—	Early 19th century (probable)	The farmhouse is in calciferous sandstone with quoins, and a green slate roof with coped gables. There are two storeys and three quoins. The doorway has a quoined surround, and the sash windows have plain surrounds. To the left is a single-storey single-bay extension with a Welsh slate roof.	II
Throp and outbuildings 54.98381°N 2.58325°W	—	1830	The farmhouse and outbuildings are in calciferous sandstone, partly from the Roman Wall, and have slate roofs. The house has quoins, coped gables, two storeys and three bays. The doorway has a flat arch with a keyed and dated entablature, and the sash windows have plain surrounds. Outbuildings are attached to both sides, one at right angles. These contain plank doors and louvred vents.	II
Willowford and farm buildings 54.99155°N 2.58802°W	—	1830	The buildings are in calciferous sandstone, partly from the nearby Roman Wall, and have slate roofs. The farmhouse has quoins, coped gables, two storeys and four bays. The doorway has an alternate block surround, and a keyed and dated entablature. The windows in the ground floor are replacement casements, and in the upper floor are original sash windows. The farm buildings enclose three sides of the farmyard, and contain plank doors and ventilation slits. All the buildings are sited between the wall and its vallum.	II
Railway bridge 54.98942°N 2.57291°W		c. 1838	The bridge was built for the Newcastle and Carlisle Railway Company to carry the railway over the Poltross Burn. It is in stone and brick, and consists of a single tall narrow round arch, and has a parapet with chamfered coping.	II

== Notes and references ==
=== Sources ===
- Historic England, "Roman Wall, west of former Vicarage, Upper Denton (1372254)", National Heritage List for England
- Historic England, "Hadrian's Wall and vallum and their associated features between Poltross Burn and the River Irthing in wall mile 48, Upper Denton (1015923)", National Heritage List for England
- Historic England, "Upper Denton Church, Upper Denton (1087564)", National Heritage List for England
- Historic England, "St Cuthbert's Church, 100m north west of Upper Denton Farm, Upper Denton (1015251)", National Heritage List for England
- Historic England, "Old Vicarage, east of Upper Denton Church, Upper Denton (1052342)", National Heritage List for England
- Historic England, "Bastle at Upper Denton, Upper Denton (1014767)", National Heritage List for England
- Historic England, "Temon and adjoining outbuilding, Upper Denton (1087520)", National Heritage List for England
- Historic England, "Nos. 1 to 4 Hall Terrace, Upper Denton (1087563)", National Heritage List for England
- Historic England, "Dinmont House, Upper Denton (1087562)", National Heritage List for England
- Historic England, "Denton Farmhouse, Upper Denton (1052372)", National Heritage List for England
- Historic England, "Throp and adjoining outbuildings, Upper Denton (1335591)", National Heritage List for England
- Historic England, "Willowford and adjoining farm buildings, Upper Denton (1052362)", National Heritage List for England
- Historic England, "Railway Bridge across the Poltross Burn, north of Milecastle 48, Hadrian's wall, Upper Denton (1045226)", National Heritage List for England
- Historic England, Listed Buildings
- Hyde, Matthew; Pevsner, Nikolaus (2010) [1967], Cumbria, The Buildings of England, New Haven and London: Yale University Press, ISBN 978-0-300-12663-1
