= Listed buildings in Oughterside and Allerby =

Oughterside and Allerby is a civil parish in the Cumberland district in Cumbria, England. It contains three listed buildings that are recorded in the National Heritage List for England. All the listed buildings are designated at Grade II, the lowest of the three grades, which is applied to "buildings of national importance and special interest". The parish is almost entirely rural, and the listed buildings consist of a bridge, a milestone, and a horse trough.

== Buildings ==
Name and location	Photograph	Date	Notes
Spring head and horse trough 54.75530°N 3.43762°W	—	Late 18th century or earlier	This consists of a rectangular water trough flanked by sandstone walls about 1.25 metres (4 ft 1 in) high and 2 metres (6 ft 7 in) long.
Milestone; 54.75562°N 3.43785°W	—	Late 18th or early 19th century	The milestone was provided for the Wigton to Workington turnpike road. It is a round-topped stone inscribed with the distances in miles to Wigton and Workington. On the top of the milestone is a benchmark.
Ellenhall Bridge; 54.73891°N 3.37381°W		Early 19th century	The bridge carries a road over the River Ellen. It is in sandstone, and consists of two segmental arches with a central pier and splayed cutwaters. The bridge has a low parapet with saddleback coping.
