= Listed buildings in Winscales =

Winscales is a civil parish in the Cumberland district, Cumbria, England. It contains two listed buildings that are recorded in the National Heritage List for England. Both the listed buildings are designated at Grade II, the lowest of the three grades, which is applied to "buildings of national importance and special interest". The parish is mainly rural, and the listed buildings comprise a farmhouse with attached farm buildings, and a milestone.

== Buildings ==
Name and location	Photograph	Date	Notes
Wythemoor Sough, barn and stable 54.60994°N 3.49495°W	—	Mid or late 18th century	The farmhouse, barn and stable are roughcast with a green slate roof. The house has two storeys and three bays, with a single-bay stable to the left, and a two-bay barn beyond that. The house has a gabled porch and sash windows in stone surrounds, in the stable is a plank door with a loft door above and ventilation slits, and the barn contains a cart entrance and a pigeon holes.
Milestone; 54.60438°N 3.53137°W	—	Late 18th or early 19th century	The milestone was provided for the Cockermouth to Whitehaven turnpike road. It consists of a square stone set at an angle with cast iron plates inscribed with the distances in miles to Workington, Cockermouth and Whitehaven.
