= Listed buildings in Temple Sowerby =

Temple Sowerby is a civil parish in Westmorland and Furness, Cumbria, England. It contains 42 listed buildings that are recorded in the National Heritage List for England. Of these, one is listed at Grade I, the highest of the three grades, one is at Grade II*, the middle grade, and the others are at Grade II, the lowest grade. The parish contains the village of Temple Sowerby and the surrounding countryside. Most of the listed buildings are in the village, and consist of houses and associated structures, farmhouses and farm buildings. Also in the village and listed are a public house, a telephone kiosk and a maypole. Outside the village, and listed, are Acorn Bank House and a water mill, both with associated structures.

== Key ==
Grade	Criteria
I	Buildings of exceptional interest, sometimes considered to be internationally important
II*	Particularly important buildings of more than special interest
II	Buildings of national importance and special interest

== Buildings ==
Name and location	Photograph	Date	Notes	Grade
Acorn Bank House; 54.64761°N 2.59455°W		Late 16th century	A country house that is now in the care of the National Trust. It is built in stone with slate roofs. The house consists of a main range of three storeys and a symmetrical front of nine bays with a band and moulded eaves. The central doorway has an architrave and a segmental pediment, and the windows are sashes with architraves. Flanking the main range are projecting two-storey wings with hipped roofs and trompe-l'œil windows.	I
Swan House and Swan Cottage; 54.63810°N 2.60222°W	—	1616	Originally an inn, later divided into two cottages, they are in stone with a Welsh slate roof. The cottages have a single storey, Swan House has three bays, and Swan Cottage, to the left, has five bays. Swan Cottage has one mullioned window, the other windows in both cottages being sashes, and both have dormers in the roof. Inside Swan House is a cruck truss.	II
Antique shop 54.63806°N 2.60371°W		17th century or earlier	This originated as a cottage and is in stone on a plinth. It has a single storey with attics, and four bays. The windows are sashes, those in the attic being horizontally-sliding.	II
Sundial, Acorn Bank House; 54.64745°N 2.59467°W	—	Mid 17th century	The sundial has been moved from another site. The sundial itself is cubic, and sits on a square stone on an oval table that is carried on balusters. The plate and gnomon are missing. On the sides of the sundial are carved coats of arms and inscriptions.	II
Garden walls and gates, Acorn Bank House; 54.64747°N 2.59362°W	—	Mid to late 17th century (possible)	The walls are in brick with flat stone copings. The oldest part is the north wall of the herb garden, and most of the walls date from the mid-18th century. The gates are in wrought iron, they are variously decorated, and some have been moved from other sites. The main gate came from Verona, and has an overthrow.	II
Rose Cottage; 54.63889°N 2.60296°W	—	1723	A sandstone house with quoins, moulded eaves and a slate roof with stone copings. There are two storeys and a symmetrical three-bay front. The door is in the centre, and the windows are mullioned in stone surrounds.	II
Temple Sowerby House; 54.63642°N 2.60337°W	—	1727	A house built in two parts, joined by a linking range, later a hotel. The earlier part is at the rear, it is pebbledashed at the front, on a plinth, with quoins, a band and a slate roof. There are two storeys, two bays, mullioned windows in the ground floor, and sash windows above. In the linking range is a dated lintel. The front part dates from the late 18th to early 19th century, it is in brick with rusticated quoins, a plinth and eaves, both moulded, and a Welsh slate roof with stone copings. It has two storeys, a symmetrical front of five bays, a central doorway with an architrave and a pediment, and sash windows in architraves. At the south end is a canted bay window, and at the north end is a two-storey coach house.	II
Beech Cottage; 54.63923°N 2.60346°W	—	Mid 18th century (probable)	The cottage is in stone with a stuccoed front, and has a slate roof with stone coping to the south. There are two storeys and four bays, two central doorways, and casement windows.	II
Countess Farmhouse and barn 54.63727°N 2.60216°W	—	18th century	The farmhouse and attached buildings are in stone with quoins and a slate roof. The original house has two storeys and a symmetrical front of three bays, a central door, and sash windows. It has been extended into a former byre to the north. To the south is a barn with a wagon doorway and a smaller doorway.	II
King's Arms Hotel; 54.63780°N 2.60401°W		18th century	Originally an inn and a house, later combined in to a public house. The former inn to the east is in stone on a chamfered plinth with rusticated quoins, a belt course, and a slate roof with stone copings. It has two storeys and five bays and a door with a pedimented architrave. The former house is stuccoed with two storeys and three bays, a doorway with a shallow porch, and two added dormers in the roof. All the windows are sashes.	II
Acorn Bank Mill; 54.64888°N 2.59915°W		Late 18th century	A water mill that was later extended, it is in stone with slate roofs and two storeys. The original part has four bays and contains casement windows. To the left is a single-bay extension with a small wagon door and a casement window, and to the right is a three-bay extension containing two doors and a loft door. Inside the mill is machinery, including two water wheels.	II*
Pigsty, Acorn Bank Mill; 54.64859°N 2.59943°W	—	Late 18th century (probable)	The pigsty is in stone with quoins and has a slate roof with stone-flagged eaves. It has a single storey and four doors, and there is a small window in each gable.	II
Beech House and stables 54.63931°N 2.60356°W	—	Late 18th century	A stone house on a chamfered plinth, with rusticated quoins, moulded eaves, and a slate roof with stone copings. There are two storeys and a symmetrical front of three bays. In the centre is a doorway with an architrave and a pediment, and an openwork cast iron porch. The windows are sashes in stone surrounds. To the left is a lower two-storey stable with a stuccoed front. It has five bays, segmental arches with impost blocks and projecting keystones.	II
Walls, piers, gates and railings, Beech House, Beech Cottage, and Sheriff House; 54.63914°N 2.60363°W	—	Late 18th century	The low stone walls run along the front of the gardens. The wall of Beech House has chamfered coping, and the gate piers are rusticated with corniced capitals and domical caps. The railings are in wrought iron and have spearhead standards. Beech Cottage has monolithic gate piers with curved tops. The wall of Sheriff House has a moulded plinth and chamfered copings, and the wrought iron railings have spearhead standards and urn finials. There are piers flanking the gates, and at the ends; they are rusticated with moulded bases, and have corniced capitals with fluting and dentils. Above the gate is a scrolled overthrow.	II
Edendale Cottage, railings and gate 54.63562°N 2.60173°W	—	Late 18th century	A stone house with a stuccoed front, rusticated quoins, and a slate roof with stone coping. It has two storeys and a symmetrical front of three bays. The windows are sashes in stone surrounds. In front of the house are railings and a gate in wrought iron.	II
Sheriff House; 54.63914°N 2.60332°W	—	Late 18th century	A stone house on a moulded plinth, with rusticated quoins, a band, and a slate roof with stone copings. There are two storeys and a symmetrical front of three bays. In the centre is a doorway with an architrave and a pediment, and the windows are sashes. At the rear is a combined doorway and staircase window with a round head and a projecting keystone. To the right of the house is a lower former cottage, in front of which is a 20th-century glazed porch.	II
Entrance arch, courtyard wall and dovecote, Acorn Bank House; 54.64724°N 2.59418°W	—	Late 18th to early 19th century	The structures are all in ashlar stone. In the centre of the courtyard wall is a semicircular arch with rusticated piers and impost blocks. Above the arch is an open pediment, and to the sides are trompe-l'œil windows. To the north is a square dovecote with a band, moulded eaves, and a pyramidal slate roof. On the apex of the roof is a wooden clock turret with corner balusters and a wrought iron weathervane. The dovecote has two storeys, a Venetian window with Tuscan columns, and two small bird openings.	II
The Cedars; 54.63707°N 2.60272°W	—	Late 18th to early 19th century	The house has been extended to incorporate a former cottage to the right. It is stuccoed and has a slate roof. The house has two storeys, and the original part has a symmetrical three-bay front. In the centre is a Doric porch that has a segmental canopy with a moulded edge. In the ground floor of the former cottage are garage doors, and all the windows are sashes.	II
Edendale House; 54.63546°N 2.60166°W	—	Late 18th to early 19th century	A stone house with quoins and a slate roof with stone copings. It has two storeys and a symmetrical front of three bays. The central doorway has an architrave and a cornice, and the windows are sashes in stone surrounds.	II
Linden House; 54.63679°N 2.60351°W	—	Late 18th to early 19th century	A stone house on a plinth with a band, an eaves cornice, a low parapet, and a slate roof with stone coping. There are two storeys and a symmetrical front of three bays. The central doorway has a stone architrave with a cornice and a rectangular fanlight, and the windows are sashes.	II
Miller's house 54.64862°N 2.59904°W	—	Late 18th to early 19th century	The miller's house was extended later. It is in stone with rusticated quoins, and has a slate roof with stone copings. The house has two storeys, a symmetrical three-bay front, a doorway with a rusticated surround and a fanlight, and sash windows in stone surrounds. To the left is a recessed single-storey wash house, and to the right is a recessed single-storey extension with a hipped roof.	II
Mountain View; 54.63898°N 2.60507°W	—	Late 18th to early 19th century	The house is in brick with rusticated quoins, moulded eaves, and a slate roof with stone copings. There are two storeys and a symmetrical five-bay front. In the centre is an open porch with square fluted corner posts. The windows are sashes in architraves.	II
Park House; 54.63667°N 2.60340°W	—	Late 18th to early 19th century	A stone house with rusticated quoins and a slate roof. There are two storeys and three bays. The doorway in the right bay has an architrave with a cornice, and the windows are sashes in stone surrounds.	II
Tannery's dovecote 54.64027°N 2.60408°W	—	Late 18th to early 19th century	The dovecote is flanked by single-storey buildings. It is in stone, with knapped river boulders giving checkerboard patterning. There are two storeys, and the dovecote has a hipped slate roof with open gablets. On the roof is a wrought iron weathervane, and below the eaves are bird openings.	II
Threshing barn and byre south of Tannery's dovecote 54.63999°N 2.60404°W	—	Late 18th to early 19th century	The building is in stone, with knapped river boulders giving checkerboard patterning. It has quoins and a slate roof, two storeys and ten bays. The doorways have segmental heads, and the windows are in stone surrounds. (Note: Street View in March 2010 shows that the building has been converted for residential use.)	II
Barn, West View Farm; 54.63990°N 2.60583°W	—	Late 18th to early 19th century	The barn is in stone with quoins, and has a slate roof with stone copings. It contains a large wagon door, and all the openings have segmental heads with imposts and projecting keystones. (Note: Street View in March 2010 shows that the barn has been converted for residential use.)	II
Woodbine House and warehouse 54.63738°N 2.60327°W	—	Late 18th to early 19th century	A stone house with rusticated quoins and a hipped slate roof. There is a symmetrical front of two storeys and three bays, and it has a central doorway with a cornice, and sash windows in stone surrounds. To the north is a stair window with a traceried round head. At the rear is a former warehouse, integral with the house, that has been much altered.	II
West View Farmhouse, cottage and byre range 54.63972°N 2.60670°W	—	1801	The buildings are in stone with rusticated quoins, and slate roofs with stone copings. The farmhouse has a band, an eaves cornice, two storeys, and a symmetrical three-bay front. The central doorway has an architrave with a pediment and the windows are sashes. The cottage to the left is slightly recessed, and in front is a lean-to conservatory containing a rusticated doorcase. To the left of the cottage is the byre range at right angles with a blind Venetian window in the gable end.	II
The Grange and domestic wing 54.63938°N 2.60585°W	—	1817	The house is in stone on a plinth, and has rusticated quoins, an eaves cornice. a low parapet, and a slate roof with stone copings. It has two storeys and a symmetrical three-bay front. In the centre is an open porch with an entablature carried on unfluted Ionic columns, and a doorway with a semicircular fanlight. The windows are sashes, and at the rear are two two-storey semicircular bay windows. To the right, a single-storey bay links to a wing at right angles.	II
Barn, cottage and byre, Acorn Bank Mill; 54.64875°N 2.59921°W	—	Early to mid 19th century	The building is in stone with quoins and a slate roof. It contains a large central wagon door, steps leading up to a small cottage door, and other doors and windows. All the doors have segmental heads.	II
Telephone kiosk 54.63742°N 2.60352°W	—	1935	A K6 type telephone kiosk, designed by Giles Gilbert Scott. Constructed in cast iron with a square plan and a dome, it has three unperforated crowns in the top panels.	II
Wall, gate piers, railings, gates, and ha-ha, Acorn Bank House; 54.64734°N 2.59493°W	—	Undated	The decorative gates in front of the house are in wrought iron. They are flanked by rusticated gate piers that have moulded bases, dentilled cornices, and stepped tops with urn finials. Outside these are low curved walls with semicircular copings and railings. To the south is a ha-ha wall.	II
Walls, piers and railings, The Cedars; 54.63701°N 2.60284°W	—	Undated	The walls enclosing the garden at the front of the house are in stone with segmental copings. Flanking the central gate, and at the ends, are rusticated piers that have capitals with cornices and urn finials. The railings have pointed standards, and the gate has a wooden frame.	II
Wall and piers, Edendale House; 54.63553°N 2.60153°W	—	Undated	The low walls in front of the garden are in stone with later copings. In the centre is a pair of monolithic gate piers that have square capitals and domical tops.	II
Walls, piers and gates to the west of The Grange; 54.63948°N 2.60554°W	—	Undated	The walls are to the east of the garden, they are on stone with flat copings, and are about 6 feet (1.8 m) high in the centre and about 4 feet (1.2 m) high elsewhere. The gates are in wrought iron and have pointed standards, and the gate piers are square and rusticated, and have capitals with cornices and domical tops.	II
Walls and railings to the east of The Grange; 54.63903°N 2.60638°W	—	Undated	The walls are on the east side of the grounds of the house, and are in stone with chamfered copings. The railings have cast iron panels with pierced decoration and foliate terminals.	II
Maypole; 54.63673°N 2.60263°W	—	Undated	The oldest part of the maypole is the base, consisting of four gritstone steps, which may on the site of an earlier cross. At the top is a wrought iron weathercock dated 1891, and the timber upright is a 20th-century replacement.	II
Walls and gate piers, Mountain View; 54.63907°N 2.60489°W	—	Undated	The stone walls enclose the forecourt of the house, the side walls curving inwards towards the house, and they have segmental copings. There is a pair of gate piers at each end. These are rusticated and have capitals with cornices, stepped tops, and ball finials. The gates are in wrought iron, and date from the 20th century.	II
Walls, piers, railings, and gate, Park House; 54.63677°N 2.60322°W	—	Undated	The stone walls enclose the garden at the front of the house. The walls at the sides are higher with segmental coping. On the lower walls at the front have chamfered coping, and railings with spearhead standards. The central gates are in wrought iron and have scrolled decoration. They are flanked by rusticated square gate piers that have capitals with cornices and domical tops. There are similar but smaller end piers.	II
Walls and gate piers, Temple Sowerby House; 54.63668°N 2.60299°W	—	Undated	The walls enclose the forecourt at the front of the house. They are in stone on a chamfered plinth, and have moulded segmental copings. There are two pairs of gate piers; they are rusticated, and have square capitals with cornices, and stepped domical tops.	II
Walls, railings and gates, West View Farmhouse; 54.63968°N 2.60687°W	—	Undated	The walls enclose the garden at the front of the farmhouse, and are in stone with chamfered coping. The railings and gates are in cast iron and have spearhead standards.	II
Walls, gate, and railings, Woodbine House; 54.63731°N 2.60336°W	—	Undated	The stone walls enclose the garden at the front of the house and have triangular copings. The gate, overthrow, and railings are in wrought iron. The gates have scrolled decoration, above them is a semicircular overthrow, and flanking them are cast iron gate posts with urn finials. On the walls are railings with fleur-de-lis standards, in sections divided by cast iron balusters with urn finials.	II

== Notes and references ==
=== Sources ===
- Historic England, "Acorn Bank House, Temple Sowerby (1226225)", National Heritage List for England
- Historic England, "Swan House and Swan Cottage, Temple Sowerby (1226957)", National Heritage List for England
- Historic England, "Antique shop to north of Village Hall, Temple Sowerby (1227019)", National Heritage List for England
- Historic England, "Sundial in front of Acorn Bank House, Temple Sowerby (1226229)", National Heritage List for England
- Historic England, "Garden walls and gates to south-east of Acorn Bank House, Temple Sowerby (1265761)", National Heritage List for England
- Historic England, "Rose Cottage, Temple Sowerby (1226920)", National Heritage List for England
- Historic England, "Temple Sowerby House, Temple Sowerby (1226719)", National Heritage List for England
- Historic England, "Beech Cottage, Temple Sowerby (1227013)", National Heritage List for England
- Historic England, "Countess farmhouse and adjoining barn, Temple Sowerby (1265609)", National Heritage List for England
- Historic England, "King's Arms Hotel, Temple Sowerby (1226915)", National Heritage List for England
- Historic England, "Acorn Bank Mill to north-west of Acorn Bank House, Temple Sowerby (1265726)", National Heritage List for England
- Historic England, "Pigsty to south-west of Acorn Bank Mill, Temple Sowerby (1226230)", National Heritage List for England
- Historic England, "Beech House and adjoining stables, Temple Sowerby (1265581)", National Heritage List for England
- Historic England, "Low walls, gate piers gates and railings to front of Beech House, Beech Cottage, and Sheriff House, Temple Sowerby (1227015)", National Heritage List for England
- Historic England, "Edendale cottage, area railings and central gate, Temple Sowerby (1226717)", National Heritage List for England
- Historic England, "Sheriff House, Temple Sowerby (1226921)", National Heritage List for England
- Historic England, "Entrance arch, front wall of courtyard, and dovecote to southeast of Acorn Bank house, Temple Sowerby (1265958)", National Heritage List for England
- Historic England, "The Cedars, Temple Sowerby (1227018)", National Heritage List for England
- Historic England, "Edendale House, Temple Sowerby (1226710)", National Heritage List for England
- Historic England, "Linden House, Temple Sowerby (1226724)", National Heritage List for England
- Historic England, "Miller's house to south-east of Acorn Bank mill, Temple Sowerby (1265959)", National Heritage List for England
- Historic England, "Mountain View, Temple Sowerby (1227058)", National Heritage List for England
- Historic England, "Park House, Temple Sowerby (1226808)", National Heritage List for England
- Historic England, "Tannery's dovecote at north end of village, Temple Sowerby (1265515)", National Heritage List for England
- Historic England, "Threshing barn and byre to south of Tannery's dovecote, Temple Sowerby (1227016)", National Heritage List for England
- Historic England, "Freestanding barn to north-east of West View farmhouse, Temple Sowerby (1227095)", National Heritage List for England
- Historic England, "Woodbine House and warehouse to rear, Temple Sowerby (1265701)", National Heritage List for England
- Historic England, "West View farmhouse with adjoining cottage and byre range, Temple Sowerby (1226918)", National Heritage List for England
- Historic England, "The Grange, house and adjoining domestic wing, Temple Sowerby (1265607)", National Heritage List for England
- Historic England, "Bank barn, incorporating cottage and byre, to south of Acorn Bank Mill, Temple Sowerby (1226706)", National Heritage List for England
- Historic England, "K6 Telephone Kiosk (near King's Arms Hotel ), Temple Sowerby (1227113)", National Heritage List for England
- Historic England, "Low wall, gate piers, railings, gates, and ha-ha wall to front of Acorn Bank House, Temple Sowerby (1226549)", National Heritage List for England
- Historic England, "Low walls, piers, and forecourt railings to front of The Cedars, Temple Sowerby (1265540)", National Heritage List for England
- Historic England, "Low wall and piers to front of Edendale House, Temple Sowerby (1265735)", National Heritage List for England
- Historic England, "Walls, gate piers, and gates to east of The Grange, Temple Sowerby (1226917)", National Heritage List for England
- Historic England, "Low walls and railings to west of The Grange, Temple Sowerby (1265608)", National Heritage List for England
- Historic England, "Maypole to south of the Cedars, Temple Sowerby (1226849)", National Heritage List for England
- Historic England, "Front and return walls, and gate piers, to Mountain View, Temple Sowerby (1227017)", National Heritage List for England
- Historic England, "Front and return walls, piers, railings, and central gate to Park House, Temple Sowerby (1226720)", National Heritage List for England
- Historic England, "Front and return walls, and gate piers, to east of Temple Sowerby House, Temple Sowerby (1265699)", National Heritage List for England
- Historic England, "Front and return walls, railings and gates to West View farmhouse, Temple Sowerby (1226919)", National Heritage List for England
- Historic England, "Front and return walls, central gate, and forecourt railings to Woodbine House, Temple Sowerby (1226728)", National Heritage List for England
- Historic England, Listed Buildings
- Hyde, Matthew; Pevsner, Nikolaus (2010) [1967], Cumbria, The Buildings of England, New Haven and London: Yale University Press, ISBN 978-0-300-12663-1
