= Listed buildings in New Hutton =

New Hutton is a civil parish in Westmorland and Furness, Cumbria, England. It contains 12 listed buildings that are recorded in the National Heritage List for England. All the listed buildings are designated at Grade II, the lowest of the three grades, which is applied to "buildings of national importance and special interest". The parish contains the village of New Hutton, and is otherwise rural. The listed buildings include farmhouses, farm buildings, houses, one of which is used as a school, a monument, a church and associated structures, and a dam and machinery house.

== Buildings ==
Name and location	Photograph	Date	Notes
Strawberry Bank Farmhouse; 54.31212°N 2.68074°W	—	Late 16th to early 17th century (probable)	The farmhouse is pebbledashed on a plinth with a slate roof. It has two storeys with an attic, a symmetrical front of three bays, a rear wing and outshut, and a lean-to the right. In the centre is a full-height gabled porch, and most of the windows are sashes.
Hay Close Farmhouse; 54.30841°N 2.71140°W	—	1713	The farmhouse is in stone with quoins and a green slate roof. There are two storeys, a symmetrical front of three bays, and a rear wing. The central door has a fanlight, and the windows are sashes. In the rear wing is a mullioned window.
Barn, Hay Close Farmhouse; 54.30810°N 2.71077°W	—	Early 18th century (probable)	A threshing barn and byre in stone with quoins and a green slate roof. It has a single tall storey with a loft at the north end, and six bays. The barn contains doorways, a casement window, ventilation slits, and there are external steps leading to a loft door.
Holme Park School; 54.31440°N 2.69664°W	—	18th century (probable)	Originally a country house, later extended and used as a school, it is in pebbledashed stone with moulded cast iron gutters, and slate roofs. It has mainly two storeys, and the main block has a symmetrical front of nine bays. In the centre is a full-height canted porch with a flat roof. The windows are sashes with architraves. To the west of the main block is a courtyard range, and to the east is a former single-storey billiard room.
Toll Bar Cottage; 54.32480°N 2.68210°W	—	Mid 18th century (probable)	Originally a toll house, later a private dwelling, it is pebbledashed stone with a slate roof. The house has a two-storey curved gable end flanked by single-storey outshuts. The windows on the front are casements with stone mullions, and at the rear is a wing with sash windows.
Midge Monument; 54.31558°N 2.69820°W	—	1766	The monument is in stone, it is about 15 feet (4.6 m) high, and has a square plan with sides about 4 feet (1.2 m) wide. The monument has a pyramidal cap with a rectangular aperture on each side, and an inscribed slab.
Fairthorn with outbuildings 54.30690°N 2.65976°W	—	Late 18th to early 19th century (probable)	A stone house that has a slate roof with stone copings. There are two storeys and a symmetrical front of three bays. The central porch is gabled with a ball finial and the windows are sashes. Attached to the left is a lower outbuilding, and to the right is a lean-to outbuilding.
Gatepiers to west of former school 54.31410°N 2.67399°W		Late 18th to early 19th century (probable)	The gate piers are in rusticated stone on a plinth, they are square with a cornice, and are about 9 feet (2.7 m) high. On top of each pier is a cast iron statue of a running greyhound on the letter "S". Between the piers is a low wall.
Gatepiers, north entrance of St Stephen's churchyard 54.31489°N 2.67382°W		Late 18th to early 19th century (probable)	The gate piers are in rusticated stone on a plinth, they are square with a cornice, and are about 9 feet (2.7 m) high. On top of each pier is a cast iron statue of a running greyhound on the letter "S". The gates, dating from about 1911, are in wrought iron.
St Stephen's Church; 54.31476°N 2.67386°W		1828–29	The church, designed by George Webster is in pebbledashed stone on a plinth, and has a slate roof with stone copings. It consists of a nave, a chancel, and a west tower, partly embraced by the nave. The tower has a parapet with stepped crenelation, and the windows are lancets.
Dam and machinery house, Fisher Tarn Reservoir; 54.32827°N 2.69293°W		1896	The dam is about 30 feet (9.1 m) high, and has a walkway along the top. In the middle are three semicircular sluice gates flanked by mock medieval towers. The machinery house is in stone with a square plan, chamfered corners, Diocletian windows, and a pyramidal stone roof.
West entrance, St Stephen's churchyard 54.31488°N 2.67402°W	—	1911	The entrance to the churchyard commemorates the Coronation of George V. It consists of a pointed stone arch with a stepped gable and an apex cross, and contains a wrought iron gate.
