= Listed buildings in Weddicar =

Weddicar is a civil parish in the Cumberland district, Cumbria, England. It contains two listed buildings that are recorded in the National Heritage List for England. Of these, one is listed at Grade II*, the middle of the three grades, and the other is at Grade II, the lowest grade. The parish is to the southeast of the town of Whitehaven, and is mainly rural. Both listed buildings originated as farmhouses.

== Key ==
Grade	Criteria
II*	Particularly important buildings of more than special interest
II	Buildings of national importance and special interest

== Buildings ==
Name and location	Photograph	Date	Notes	Grade
Nether End Farmhouse; 54.52993°N 3.55379°W	—	1624	The farmhouse has been considerably altered and extended, mainly in the 19th century. It is in rendered stone with a string course, moulded eaves, and slate roofs. There are two storeys, four bays of the original part remain, there is a recessed two-bay 19th-century extension on the right, and an outshut at the rear. Above the door is a decorated, inscribed and dated lintel. The windows were originally mullioned or mullioned and transomed, and some have been altered and sashes or casements inserted.	II*
The Cross; 54.52972°N 3.55704°W	—	Late 18th to early 19th century	A large farmhouse later divided into flats, it is in ashlar with a lintel band, moulded eaves, and a slate roof with stone copings. There are two storeys, cellars, a symmetrical five-bay front, and a rear outshut. A stone staircase with wrought iron railings leads up to a central doorway that has a pediment and a fanlight with Gothic tracery. The windows are sashes in architraves, there is a stair window on the west front with a segmental head and ogee tracery, and a small Venetian window in the attic.	II
