= Listed buildings in Woodside, Cumbria =

Woodside is a civil parish in the Cumberland district, Cumbria, England. It contains 16 listed buildings that are recorded in the National Heritage List for England. All the listed buildings are designated at Grade II, the lowest of the three grades, which is applied to "buildings of national importance and special interest". The parish lies to the north and east of the town of Wigton, it contains the hamlet of Oulton, and is otherwise rural. All the listed buildings are houses and associated structures, farmhouses, and farm buildings.

== Buildings ==
| Name and location | Photograph | Date | Notes |
|---|---|---|---|
| Clay house, Aikhead Hall; 54.83275°N 3.19029°W | — | Mid to late 17th century | A farmhouse built with clay walls on a plinth of sandstone and cobble, and with a roof of sandstone slate. It has two storeys and two bays. The house contains casement windows, a fire window, and two doorways with chamfered surrounds. Inside the house is a bressumer. |
| Moorthwaite and barn 54.82845°N 3.10164°W | — | 1691 | The farmhouse was extended in 1731, and the barn dates from the late 18th century. The original house is in sandstone with quoins, and the extension and barn are in brick; they all have a green slate roof with coped gables. There are two storeys, the original house has two bays, the higher three-bay extension is to the left, and the barn is at right angles to the left and partly incorporated into the house. The door in the original house has a chamfered surround, that in the extension has an architrave, and both have dated lintels. The windows are sashes with architraves. The barn has decorative brick vents, at the end is a bay window, and there is also a cart entrance. Inside the extension is an inglenook and a bressumer. |
| Moorthwaite Cottage with former barn 54.82934°N 3.10067°W | — | 1691 | A farmhouse incorporating earlier material, later divided into two residences, and after that into one house. It is in sandstone with a roof partly of slate and partly of stone slate. The house has a T-shaped plan and is in two storeys. The front range has three bays, with a single-bay extension to the left. The doorway has a chamfered surround and an inscribed and dated lintel, and there is a datestone above it. The flanking windows are mullioned and contain casements, the other windows in the front being sashes. The rear range contains two doorways and windows, some of which are mullioned and the others are sashes. Inside the rear range is a bressumer. |
| Kirkland Hall; 54.82534°N 3.12853°W | — | Early 18th century | A sandstone farmhouse on a chamfered plinth, with quoins, a string course, an eaves cornice, and a Welsh slate roof with coped gables. There are two storeys and five bays. The doorway has panelled reveals, a pilastered surround, a triglyph frieze, and a dentilled pediment. On the front the windows are sashes in architraves, and at the rear they are casements. |
| Wall and gate, Kirkland Hall; 54.82519°N 3.12852°W | — | Early 18th century | The low wall in front of the garden is in ashlar, and has rusticated end piers, and pilastered gateposts surmounted by pineapple finials. The gate is in wrought iron and has a scrolled overthrow. |
| Chapel House; 54.84635°N 3.17645°W | — | Mid 18th century | A farmhouse that incorporates the rear of an earlier house, including a re-used lintel dated 1688. The farmhouse is in brick on a chamfered plinth, with quoins, and a green slate roof with some sandstone slate. It has two storeys and four bays, a round-headed doorway with a false keystone, and sash windows in stone architraves. At the rear is a three-light chamfered mullioned and a fire window. |
| Aikhead Hall and barns 54.83266°N 3.19048°W | — | Late 18th century | The farmhouse is in sandstone on a chamfered plinth, with quoins, an eaves cornice, and a green slate roof. It has two storeys, three bays, a Tuscan doorcase with a pediment, and sash windows in stone surrounds. To the left are two low barns, the first barn containing doors, a cart entrance, and casement windows, and the further one being in clay with a rendered front wall and a rear wall repaired in brick. |
| Mains Farmhouse; 54.83356°N 3.15631°W | — | Late 18th century | A stone farmhouse with quoins and a green slate roof, it has two storeys and three bays. The house has an ornamental classical doorcase that has an architrave with egg-and-dart decoration. The windows are casements in architraves, and at the rear is a staircase window. |
| Wall and gateposts, Mains Farmhouse; 54.83348°N 3.15632°W | — | Late 18th century | The wall is in front of the garden and is in ashlar with quoins. There are pairs of gateposts and end piers that are square and pilastered, and have pineapple finials. |
| Greenwood House; 54.82829°N 3.11898°W | — | Late 18th or early 19th century | A stuccoed farmhouse on a chamfered plinth, with a string course, angle pilasters, and a green slate roof. There are two storeys and six bays. The doorway has a prostyle Tuscan porch, and most of the windows are sashes in stone architraves. The three ground floor window to the right of the porch have been enlarged into French windows. |
| Milestone; 54.83505°N 3.13493°W | — | Late 18th or early 19th century | The milestone was provided for the Carlisle to Cockermouth turnpike road. It is in red sandstone and has a round top and a curved face. On it is a cast iron plate inscribed with the distances in miles to Carlisle, Wigton and Cockermouth. |
| Low Dockrayrigg; 54.84308°N 3.15946°W | — | 1810 | A sandstone farmhouse with a green slate roof, it has two storeys and two bays. The doorway has a stone architrave and a pediment, and the sash windows have stone surrounds. At the rear is a three-light stair window. |
| Coach house, Greenwood House; 54.82813°N 3.11918°W | — | Early 19th century | The coach house is built in sandstone and split cobbles, and has quoins and a green slate roof. There is one storey, and the coach house contains a carriage entrance with an alternate block surround, above which is a quatrefoil window. |
| Wall, Greenwood House; 54.82837°N 3.11919°W | — | Early 19th century | The low wall in front of the garden is in stone and has chamfered coping. At the ends are square stone piers with cornices, and surmounted by metal stags. |
| Kirkland Villa and barn 54.82490°N 3.12836°W | — | Early 19th century | The farmhouse and attached barn are in sandstone; the main part of the house has a green slate roof, its extension and the barn have a roof of sandstone slate. The house has two storeys, a main part of two bays, a lower single-bay extension to the left and a barn beyond that. The house has angle pilasters, a chamfered plinth, and sash windows in stone surrounds. There is a doorway with a fanlight in the extension, which is divided from the barn by a pilaster. In front of the barn is a lean-to extension with a cart entrance. |
| Tarnside; 54.85512°N 3.15966°W | — | Early 19th century | A farmhouse that was extended in 1840, it is built in sandstone and cobbles on a chamfered plinth, with quoins, a dentilled eaves cornice, and a hipped green slate roof. There are two storeys and three bays, with flanking single-bay wings. The doorway has a radial fanlight in a round-headed surround with a false keystone, and the windows are sashes. |
