= Calciferous sandstone =

Obsolete geological term

Calciferous sandstone is an obsolete geological term relating to strata at the base of the Carboniferous formation, below the coal measures. The rocks of this formation are now considered part of the Inverclyde Group and Strathclyde Group.

Typically this geological sequence, as in the Touch Hills and Fintry Hills to the west of Stirling contains a mixture of lavas and sedimentary rocks, including sandstone and mudstone, and lies unconformably on top of older Devonian strata.
