= List of works by C. J. Ferguson =

Charles John Ferguson (usually known as C. J. Ferguson) (1840–1904) was an English architect who practised mainly in Carlisle, Cumbria. He was the younger son of Joseph Ferguson of Carlisle, and was articled to the architect John A. Cory. He spent some years in partnership with Cory, but most of his career was in single-handed practice. His output included new churches, restoration of existing churches, and work on country houses and public buildings. The architectural styles he used were mainly Gothic Revival and Norman.

Works designed in association with Cory are denoted by †.

== Key ==
Grade	Criteria
Grade I	Buildings of exceptional interest, sometimes considered to be internationally important.
Grade II*	Particularly important buildings of more than special interest.
Grade II	Buildings of national importance and special interest.

== Works ==
Name	Location	Photograph	Date	Notes	Grade
High Close †	Elterwater, Cumbria; 54.4385°N 3.0217°W		1866	Extension to a 17th-century farmhouse converted into a mansion by Cory in 1857. Later converted into a youth hostel.	—
County and Station Hotel †	Carlisle, Cumbria; 54.8911°N 2.9329°W		1866–68	A hotel by Anthony Salvin, extended by Cory and Ferguson, adding a tower and a ballroom. Later known as the County Hotel, then the Lakes Court Hotel.	II
St Paul's Church †	Pooley Bridge, Cumbria; 54.6125°N 2.8180°W		1867–68	A new church with a bellcote surmounted by a spire.	—
St John's Church	Gamblesby, Cumbria; 54.7470°N 2.6079°W		1868	A new church, small with a rounded apse and a wooden bellcote, in the style of the 13th century.	II
St Bride's Church †	Bridekirk, Cumbria; 54.6905°N 3.3723°W		1868–70	A new church, replacing an older church, the ruins of which are nearby. In Neo-Norman style with a cruciform plan.	II
St Cuthbert's Church †	Nether Denton, Cumbria; 54.9744°N 2.6344°W		1868–70	A new church with a bellcote, replacing an older church.	II
Christ Church †	Silloth, Cumbria; 54.8701°N 3.3879°W		1869–70	A new church with a steeple; the competition for its design was won by Ferguson.	II
St Mary	Lanercost, Cumbria; 54.9662°N 2.6949°W		1869–1870s	Restoration of a church created from a priory, including most of the furnishings.	I
St John the Evangelist's Church	Cleator Moor, Cumbria; 54.5234°N 3.5237°W	—	1870–72	A new church in Norman style.	II
All Saints Church †	Cumdivock, Cumbria; 54.8293°N 3.0311°W	—	1870–72	A new church with a bellcote. The church stands near to Ferguson's home of Cardew Lodge.	—
Cumberland Infirmary	Carlisle, Cumbria; 54.8958°N 2.9551°W	—	1870–74	Added single-storey links to the building by Richard Tattersall of 1831–32; only one of these remains.	II*
St Mary's Church †	Piercebridge, County Durham; 54.5366°N 1.6764°W		1873	A new church with a west bellcote.	II
Vicarage	Lanercost, Cumbria; 54.9659°N 2.6958°W	—	1873–	Restoration of the vicarage created from the guest house of Lanercost Priory.	I
St James' Church †	Welton, Cumbria; 54.7886°N 3.0073°W		1874	A new church with a bellcote at the northwest corner.	—
Crosthwaite Parish Hall	Keswick, Cumbria; 54.6026°N 3.1408°W	—	1875	A stone building with a timber-framed gable.	—
Kirklinton Hall †	Kirklinton, Cumbria; 54.9980°N 2.8840°W	—	1875	A country house enlarged and made grander, including an additional wing. Now a ruin.	—
St John's Church	Bigrigg, Egremont, Cumbria; 54.5097°N 3.5493°W	—	1877–80	A small, new church in Decorated style.	II
Bush Hotel	Carlisle, Cumbria; 55.0096°N 2.9725°W	—	1878	Public house.	II
St Michael's Church	Isel, Cumbria; 54.6879°N 3.3009°W		1878	Restoration of a church dating from the 12th century, including choir stalls and a pulpit.	I
Holy Ghost Church	Middleton, Cumbria; 54.2700°N 2.5802°W		1878–79	A new church replacing older churches in Perpendicular style with a bellcote.	II
St James' Church	Tebay, Cumbria; 54.4339°N 2.5933°W	—	1878–80	A new church with a western apse for a baptistry.	II
St Andrew's Church	Greystoke, Cumbria; 54.6690°N 2.8645°W		1878–99	Restorations of a former collegiate church dating from 14th century.	II*
Woodside Lodge and Stables	St Cuthbert Without, Cumbria; 54.8456°N 2.8918°W	—	1879–80	To the south of Woodside; a two-storey house with a half-timbered upper floor, and a single-storey stable block. The adjacent gatepiers to the former house are also listed at Grade II.	II
St Kentigern's Church	Caldbeck, Cumbria; 54.7495°N 3.0495°W		1880	Restoration of a church dating from the 12th and 13th centuries; this included adding the chancel roof.	I
St John the Evangelist's Church	Crosscanonby, Cumbria; 54.7373°N 3.4472°W		1880	Restoration of a church dating from the 12th century.	I
Muncaster Castle	Ravenglass, Cumbria; 54.3547°N 3.3809°W		1880s	Additions to a building modernised by Anthony Salvin in phases from 1862.	I
Naworth Castle	Brampton, Cumbria; 54.9560°N 2.6888°W		1880s	Taking over from Philip Webb in 1879, Ferguson made further alterations, including a library, following Webb's plans, and adding the Stanley wing (since demolished).	I
St Oswald's Church	Burneside, Cumbria; 54.3547°N 2.7635°W		1880–81	Replaced an earlier church of 1823–28, other than the north aisle. In Decorated style.	—
Armathwaite Hall	Bassenthwaite, Cumbria; 54.6810°N 3.2325°W		1881	Remodelling of a country house in Tudor style. Later used as a hotel.	II
All Saints Church	Raughton Head, Cumbria; 54.8012°N 2.9670°W		1881	Height of the tower raised for a church built in 1761.	II
St Cuthbert's Church	Upper Denton, Cumbria; 54.9827°N 2.6021°W		1881	Restoration of a church dating probably from the 12th century, now redundant.	II*
St Mary's Church	Wigton, Cumbria; 54.8237°N 3.1595°W		1881	Restoration of a church dated 1788.	II*
Deanery and Prior's Tower	Carlisle Cathedral, Cumbria; 54.8942°N 2.9395°W	—	1882	Internal alterations.	I
St Mungo's Church	Dearham, Cumbria; 54.7140°N 3.4412°W		1882	Added the north aisle to a Norman church.	I
Haile Church	Haile, Cumbria; 54.4654°N 3.4974°W		1882–83	Added the west porch, roofs and screen.	II
Bank and chemist's shop	Brampton, Cumbria; 54.9421°N 2.7349°W	—	1883	One building divided into two units. The bank was for the Cumberland Union Banking Company, later HSBC.	II
St Nicholas' Church	Whitehaven, Cumbria; 54.5481°N 3.5877°W		1883	Rebuilding of a chapel as Ferguson's grandest church. Severely damaged by fire in 1971, leaving only the tower, porch, and west transept.	II
All Saints Church	Watermillock, Cumbria; 54.5987°N 2.8813°W		1884	Rebuilt the Church; with a west tower, and most of the furnishings by Ferguson.	II
St Patrick's Church	Bampton, Cumbria; 54.5553°N 2.7413°W		1884–85	Restoration of a church dating from 1726–28, which included removal of the west gallery, and reworking the tower and chancel arches.	II*
All Saints Church	Clive, Shropshire; 52.8116°N 2.7212°W		1885–87	Virtual rebuilding of a Norman church, starting with the reconstruction of the nave and addition of the chancel in 1885–87, followed by the steeple in 1894–97 for J. J. Bibby of the Bibby Line.	II*
St James' Church	Whitehaven, Cumbria; 54.5508°N 3.5834°W		1886	Reordering of a church built in 1752–53.	I
All Souls Church	Netherton, Maryport, Cumbria; 54.7101°N 3.4851°W	—	After 1886	An incomplete large town church with a small bellcote. Initially the nave was built then, with Harry Foxall, the chancel and south aisle were added in 1899–1906.	—
St Mary's Church †	Eaton Socon, Cambridgeshire; 52.2156°N 0.2883°W		1886–89	Added an organ chamber on the north side of the church.	II*
Prebendal house	Carlisle Cathedral, Cumbria; 54.8947°N 2.9396°W	—	1888	Alterations and additions to a 17th-century house.	II*
St Kentigern's Church	Castle Sowerby, Cumbria; 54.7165°N 2.9639°W		1888	Restoration of a church dating from the 12th century.	II*
Cardew Lodge	Cardew, Dalston, Cumbria; 54.8326°N 3.0336°W	—	1889	A house built in the 1870s, extended for his own use, adding a round tower.	II
Gateway	Cardew Lodge, Cardew, Dalston, Cumbria; 54.8323°N 3.0327°W	—	1889	A pair of round towers flanking the gateway, one converted into a cottage.	II
Garden wall	Cardew Lodge, Cardew, Dalston, Cumbria; 54.8321°N 3.0328°W	—	1889	A wall running south from the gateway; has a battlemented parapet and arrow slits.	II
Lodge	Cardew Lodge, Cardew, Dalston, Cumbria; 54.8304°N 3.0312°W		1889	A lodge on the road to the southeast of Cardew Lodge.	II
St Kentigern's Church	Great Crosthwaite, Keswick, Cumbria; 54.6083°N 3.1512°W		1889	Work included re-fashioning the east window, and adding a reredos and pulpit.	II*
Dalston Hall	Dalston, Cumbria; 54.8550°N 2.9725°W	—	1889–90	Rebuilt the entrance front of a building that originated with a pele tower, the house being added in about 1612. Later used as a hotel.	II*
St Cuthbert's Church	Seascale, Cumbria; 54.3966°N 3.4834°W		1889–90	A new church in Decorated style.	II
St John the Baptist's Church	Upperby, Carlisle, Cumbria; 54.8746°N 2.9184°W		1889–90	Added a chancel to a church built in 1843, with a Decorated east window.	—
St Michael's Church	Dalston, Cumbria; 54.8423°N 2.9834°W		1890	Rebuilt the church in Decorated style.	II*
St Philip's Church	Eaglesfield, Cumbria; 54.6397°N 3.3854°W		1890–91	A new church, also known as the John Dalton Memorial Church.	—
Newbiggin Hall	Newbiggin, Cumbria; 54.6519°N 2.5781°W		1890–91	Added the drawing room wing.	II*
Nunwick Hall	Great Salkeld, Cumbria; 54.7162°N 2.6954°W	—	1892	A new house in Tudor style.	II
Nunwick Hall Lodge	Great Salkeld, Cumbria; 54.7146°N 2.6993°W	—	1892	Lodge to the southwest of Nunwick Hall.	II
Tullie House Museum and Art Gallery	Carlisle, Cumbria; 54.8953°N 2.9407°W		1892–93	A town house of 1689, converted into a museum. The conversion was led by Ferguson, who also added extensions.	I
St Thomas' Church	Selside, Cumbria; 54.3862°N 2.7168°W		1894	Added the tower to a church rebuilt in 1838.	II
Bamburgh Castle	Bamburgh, Northumberland; 55.6089°N 1.7105°W		1894–1904	Extensive alterations for William Armstrong.	I
St Martin's Hall	Brampton, Cumbria; 54.9417°N 2.7384°W		1895	A sandstone parish hall immediately to the west of St Martin's Church, consisting of three meeting rooms and a hall.	II
St Laurence's Church	Morland, Cumbria; 54.5965°N 2.6235°W		1896	Restoration of a church dating from the 11th century.	I
St Mary's Church	Gosforth, Cumbria; 54.4192°N 3.4314°W		1896–99	A rebuilding of a church dating from the 12th century, incorporating some Norman fabric.	I
All Hallows Church	Mealsgate, Cumbria; 54.7711°N 3.2493°W		1896–99	A new church to replace a redundant church on a different site; with a large west tower, and lancet windows. The benches and font are also by Ferguson.	—
Stable Court	Hadnall, Shropshire; 52.7901°N 2.7135°W	—	1898	A stable block for Hardwick Grange (now demolished) for J. J. Bibby of the Bibby Line.	—
Library Block	Nelson Thomlinson School, Wigton, Cumbria; 54.8216°N 3.1557°W	—	1898–99	New hall for the school.	II
St Gabriel's Court	Carlisle, Cumbria; 54.8952°N 2.9259°W	—	1899	Extension to a pair of semi-detached houses built in 1896.	II
St Aidan's Church	Carlisle, Cumbria; 54.8947°N 2.9205°W		1899–1902	A new church.	II
St Aidan's Church Hall	Carlisle, Cumbria; 54.8949°N 2.9204°W	—	1901	A new hall to the north of the church.	II
St John's Church	Houghton, Cumbria; 54.9294°N 2.9250°W	—	1901	Interior renovated.	II
All Saints Church	Penruddock, Cumbria; 54.6412°N 2.8857°W	—	1902	A small church with windows in Perpendicular style.	—
