= Listed buildings in Glassonby =

Glassonby is a civil parish in Westmorland and Furness, Cumbria, England. It contains 19 listed buildings that are recorded in the National Heritage List for England. Among these, two are listed at Grade II*, the middle of the three grades, and the others are at Grade II, the lowest grade. The parish contains the villages of Glassonby, Gamblesby, and Unthank, and the surrounding countryside. Most of the listed buildings are houses and associated structures, farmhouses and farm buildings. The other listed buildings include churches and associated structures, a former public house, and two milestones.

== Key ==
Grade	Criteria
II*	Particularly important buildings of more than special interest
II	Buildings of national importance and special interest

== Buildings ==
Name and location	Photograph	Date	Notes	Grade
St Michael's Church; 54.73796°N 2.66250°W		Early 16th century (probable)	The church contains some earlier material, alterations were made in 1786 and in 1898, and the porch was rebuilt in 1840. The church is in sandstone, and has a green slate roof with coped gables. It consists of a nave with a south porch, and a chancel, and has a twin bellcote on the west gable. In the porch are a pieces of a 9th-century cross shaft, a 10th-century hog back stone, and an incised grave slab.	II*
Outbuilding, White House Farm; 54.74362°N 2.65781°W	—	Late 16th century	Originally a bastle house, later used as a farm outbuilding, it is in sandstone with very thick walls, and has a green slate roof. There are two storeys and two bays. External steps lead up to the first floor doorway, which has a pointed head and a straight chamfer. The windows are small, with chamfered surrounds and iron bars. At the rear and side are later ground floor entrances.	II*
House north-east of Home Farmhouse; 54.74068°N 2.65976°W	—	1604	This originated as a single-storey three-bay cottage, and was extended in the late 18th century by the addition of a storey and two bays to the right. It is in sandstone, the roof of the left two bays is in Welsh slate, and the roof of the right two bays is tiled. There are two small original windows in the ground floor of the earlier part and one later sash window, in the upper floor they are casements, and in the extension the windows are sashes.	II
Keeper's Cottage and outbuildings 54.74256°N 2.65852°W	—	1640	The house and outbuildings are in sandstone. The house has a Welsh slate roof, two storeys and four bays. The door and sash windows have plain surrounds, and there is one mullioned window with a chamfered surround. The outbuildings to the rear are in one and two storeys and have sandstone slate roofs. The openings include doors, external steps up to a loft door, and an arched cart entrance.	II
Byres and storehouse, Old Hall Farm; 54.74340°N 2.65593°W	—	Mid 17th century (probable)	This was the original farmhouse, and later used for other purposes. It is in sandstone with large quoins, and a roof mainly of Welsh slate and a bottom course of stone-slate. On the front is a plank door and mullioned windows, all with wooden lintels. At the rear is a similar doorway, and the windows vary.	II
Village stocks 54.74889°N 2.60857°W		Late 17th century (probable)	What is left of the stocks is a long narrow piece of red sandstone with hollows to take two pairs of legs, and leg clamps in iron. They are set on a stepped sandstone plinth.	II
Green Edge; 54.74793°N 2.60835°W	—	Late 17th or early 18th century	Originally a farmhouse, later a private house, it is in sandstone and has a green slate roof with coped gables. There are two storeys, three bays, and a single-bay extension at the rear. On the front is a porch, and the windows are sashes in chamfered surrounds.	II
Former house and stable behind the Red Lion Inn; 54.74734°N 2.60680°W	—	Early 18th century	The former house and stable are in sandstone with a sandstone slate roof. The house has two storeys and one bay, and to the left is a two-bay stable. In the house is a door with a plain surround, and there are two mullioned windows. The stable has a door, a loft door, and two windows, one a casement.	II
Hillcrest; 54.74872°N 2.60873°W	—	1736	The farmhouse, later a private house, is in sandstone with a roof of Welsh slate and sandstone slate. There are two storeys and two bays. The doorway has a chamfered surround and a dated and inscribed frieze, and the windows are sashes in chamfered surrounds.	II
St Martins Cottage and barn 54.74817°N 2.60842°W	—	1739	The house and barn are in sandstone with slate roofs. The house has two storeys and four bays. The doorway has a chamfered surround and a dated and inscribed lintel. Some of the windows are mullioned with casements, and others are sashes. The barn to the left has a large cart entrance and two rows of ventilation slits.	II
Former Red Lion Inn; 54.74730°N 2.60700°W		1741	The former public house, later a private dwelling, is rendered on a chamfered plinth, with quoins, a plain cornice, and a Welsh slate roof. There are two storeys and three bays. The doorway has a chamfered surround and an inscribed and dated lintel, and the windows are sashes in plain stone surrounds.	II
Town End Farmhouse; 54.75018°N 2.60867°W	—	1762	The farmhouse is in sandstone and has a Welsh slate roof. There are two storeys, three bays, and later extensions at the rear. The doorway has a chamfered surround, and above it is an inscribed and dated plaque in a frieze and a moulded cornice. The windows are sashes in plain stone surrounds.	II
Blencathra View; 54.74826°N 2.60730°W	—	Late 18th or early 19th century	A sandstone house on a chamfered plinth, with quoins, a string course, and a green slate roof. There are two storeys and three bays. Above the door is a fanlight, and the windows are sashes; all have plain raised stone surrounds.	II
Unthank Farmhouse; 54.75772°N 2.60728°W	—	Early 19th century	A sandstone house on a chamfered plinth with a green slate roof. It has two storeys and three bays, and there is a lower two-storey single-bay extension to the left with a Welsh slate roof. Above the central doorway is a cornice on consoles. The doorway and windows, which are sashes, have raised stone surrounds.	II
Milestone; 54.77477°N 2.51027°W	—	Early 19th century (probable)	The milestone was provided for the Penrith to Alston turnpike road, It is a square stone with a rounded top, and is inscribed with the distances in miles to Penrith and to Alston. On the top is a benchmark.	II
Milestone; 54.77407°N 2.53465°W	—	Early 19th century (probable)	The milestone was provided for the Penrith to Alston turnpike road, It is a square stone with a rounded top, and is inscribed with the distances in miles to Penrith and to Alston. On the top is a benchmark.	II
Churchyard walls, gate and gate piers, St Michael's Church; 54.73823°N 2.66219°W	—	Mid 19th century	The walls enclose the churchyard on four sides. They are in sandstone with a rounded coping. The square gate piers are in ashlar, and have moulded caps and ball finials. The gates are in iron and between the piers is an iron overthrow.	II
St John's Church; 54.74704°N 2.60792°W		1868	The church, designed by C. J. Ferguson, is in sandstone on a chamfered plinth, and has a string course and a green slate roof with decorative ridge tiles. It consists of a nave, a chancel with an apse, and a north vestry. At the west end is a wooden bell-turret with a slate-hung broach spire. The windows are lancets and have chamfered surrounds.	II
Hearse House and stables 54.73822°N 2.66193°W	—	1896	The building is in sandstone with large quoins and a sandstone slate roof. There is one storey and four bays. On the front are plank doors of various sizes.	II
