= St James' Church, Whitehaven =

Coordinates: 54.5508°N 3.5834°W

St James' Church
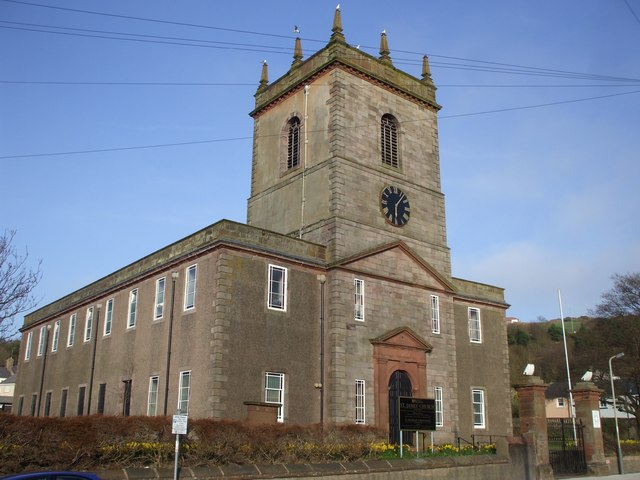
- St James' Church from the northwest

- Location in Copeland Borough Location in Cumbria
- OS grid reference: NX 977 184
- Location: High Street, Whitehaven, Cumbria
- Country: England
- Denomination: Anglican

History
- Status: Parish church
- Founded: 1752
- Founder: Sir James Lowther
- Dedication: Saint James the Greater
- Consecrated: 25 July 1753

Architecture
- Functional status: Active
- Heritage designation: Grade I
- Designated: 20 July 1949
- Architect: Carlisle Spedding (?)
- Architectural type: Church
- Style: Georgian
- Completed: 1753

Administration
- Province: York
- Diocese: Carlisle
- Archdeaconry: West Cumberland
- Deanery: Calder
- Parish: Whitehaven

Clergy
- Rector: Revd Robert Jackson

St James' Church is in High Street, Whitehaven, Cumbria, England, at the crossing with the top of Queen Street. It stands in an elevated position overlooking the town. The church is an active Anglican parish church in the deanery of Calder, the archdeaconry of West Cumberland, and the diocese of Carlisle. The church is recorded in the National Heritage List for England as a designated Grade I listed building.

== History ==
The church was built in 1752–53 at a cost of £3,400 (equivalent to £650,000 in 2025). Its design has been attributed to Carlisle Spedding, who was agent and mining engineer to Sir James Lowther. However the authors of Buildings of England series note that no other building designed by Spedding is known, and it has been suggested that the architect was Christopher Myers, who later designed churches in Ireland. The land for the church was given by Sir James. In 1871 the apse was restored, blocking the east Venetian window, and introducing top lighting. The interior of the church was reordered in 1886 by C. J. Ferguson, which including moving the altar and the organ. In 1921 the southeast of the church was converted into a war memorial chapel, and the northeast into a baptistry. The interior of the church was reordered again in 1979–80, which included removal of the tiered seats in the galleries. Glass doors were installed at the entrance to the church in 1997, and in the following year two new bells were added.

== Architecture ==
=== Exterior ===
St James' is designed in Neoclassical style. The west side of the tower and the centre bay of the west end are in ashlar stone, and the rest of the church is roughcast with rusticated quoins. The roofs are slated. The plan of the church is that of a rectangular body, with an embraced west tower, and an elliptical apse at the east end. The apse is top-lit by a dome. The tower is surmounted by a cornice with a plain parapet, and pinnacles in the form of obelisks. The bell openings are round-headed. Around the church are rectangular windows in two tiers. The Venetian east window is blocked. At the west end is a round-headed doorway flanked by pilasters supporting a triglyph frieze above which is a pediment. Over this is another larger pediment.

=== Interior ===
Writing in 1967, the architectural historian Nikolaus Pevsner stated that this was "the finest Georgian church interior in the county", and the later authors of the Buildings of England series describe the interior as "serenely beautiful". It is entered from the west door by a sliding glass door leading into a vestibule in the base of the tower. This is etched with the national symbols of Sri Lanka. On each side of the vestibule are stairs rising to the galleries. In the body of the church are galleries on the north, west, and south sides, which are carried on Doric columns. Along the front of the galleries is a triglyph frieze, and rising from the galleries to the ceiling are Ionic columns. The ceiling is flat, and is decorated with plaster roundels containing depictions of the Annunciation and the Ascension, and with angels and cherubs in Rococo style. The apse contains a painting of the Transfiguration by Giulio Cesare Procaccini surrounded by a pedimented aedicule. The painting was given to the church by the 3rd Earl of Lonsdale, and is said to have come from the Escorial. Flanking this are four Ionic pilasters.

The 18th-century timber pulpit is polygonal, and is decorated with fluted pilasters and arched panels. The font consists of a shallow bowl on a baluster, it is made from Florentine marble and is thought to date from the 17th century. Also in the church are paintings from the early 18th century by Mathias Read. There are stained glass windows by Shrigley and Hunt (1917 and 1924), William Wailes (1873), Abbott and Company (1930s and later), Leonard Evetts (1976), and Alex Haynes (1999). The three manual pipe organ was built in 1909 by Norman and Beard, and completely restored in 2011 by Mander. There is a ring of twelve bells. The oldest of these were cast in 1586 and 1624 by Henry Oldfield I and George Oldfield I respectively. The others were all made by John Taylor and Company in 1872 (1), 1908 (4), 1978 (3), and 1998 (2).

== Exterior features ==
The gate piers at the entrance to the churchyard opposite the west end of the church have been listed at Grade II. They consist of two square stone gate piers with cornices. There was formerly a wrought iron lamp holder on the cross bar.

== See also ==
- Grade I listed churches in Cumbria
- Grade I listed buildings in Cumbria
- Listed buildings in Whitehaven
- List of works by C. J. Ferguson
