= Listed buildings in Newbiggin, Kirkby Thore =

Newbiggin is a civil parish in Westmorland and Furness, Cumbria, England. It contains 14 listed buildings that are recorded in the National Heritage List for England. Of these, one is listed at Grade II*, the middle of the three grades, and the others are at Grade II, the lowest grade. The parish includes the village of Newbiggin and the surrounding countryside. The most important building is Newbiggin Hall, originally a tower house and later a country house; the hall and associated structures are listed. The other listed buildings Include a church, items in the churchyard, a chapel, a bridge, farmhouses and farm buildings.

== Key ==
Grade	Criteria
II*	Particularly important buildings of more than special interest
II	Buildings of national importance and special interest

== Buildings ==
Name and location	Photograph	Date	Notes	Grade
Cross base 54.65152°N 2.57847°W	—	Medieval	The cross base is in the churchyard of St Edmund's Church. It is in sandstone, and consists of two steps, each composed of four blocks. In the socket are the remains of a cross shaft.	II
St Edmund's Church; 54.65163°N 2.57839°W		14th century	The church was rebuilt in the 14th century, retaining some Norman features. It is in stone with pilaster buttresses, and has slate roofs with stone copings. The church consists of a nave and chancel in a single cell, with a bellcote on the west gable and an apex cross at the east end. Inside the church is a north chapel in Tudor style.	II
Newbiggin Hall; 54.65189°N 2.57804°W		c. 1460	Originally a tower house, later expanded into a country house, it is built in stone with quoins, and has hipped slate roofs and embattled parapets. The original tower is known as the Jerusalem Tower, and a larger tower, the East Tower was added in the late 16th century. In 1533 the West Tower was built with a hall linking it to the rest of the building. The hall was remodelled in 1569, and an oval dining room was added in 1796. The West Tower was rebuilt in 1844 by Anthony Salvin, and a wing was added in 1890–91 by C. J. Ferguson.	II*
Newbiggin Hall Farmhouse; 54.65050°N 2.57822°W	—	Late 17th century	The farmhouse is in stone with quoins, and has an artificial slate roof. There are two storeys, eight bays, and a 19th-century single-storey wing at the rear. The doorway has an inscribed and dated lintel and a cornice, and the windows are mullioned.	II
Coach house and barn, Newbiggin Hall; 54.65151°N 2.57706°W	—	1794–96	The coach house and barn are in stone with quoins, and have a slate roof with stone copings. They contain four large wagon doors with segmental heads, imposts, and projecting keystones. The ventilation slits have chamfered surrounds. There are also inserted windows and doors.	II
Grooms' quarters, Newbiggin Hall; 54.65135°N 2.57702°W	—	1794–96	The building is in stone with quoins and has a slate roof hipped to the west. There are two storeys and a symmetrical front of five bays. In the centre is a doorway flanked by casement windows, and there are smaller windows in the upper floor.	II
Hen-house and pigsty, Newbiggin Hall; 54.65175°N 2.57871°W	—	1794–96	Attached to the hen-house and pigsty is an earth closet. The building is in stone with quoins and a slate roof. All the doors have segmental heads, and flanking the hen-house door are small openings with ledges. Inside, the stone nesting boxes have been retained.	II
Labourers' quarters and byre, Newbiggin Hall; 54.65143°N 2.57716°W	—	1794–96	The building is in stone with quoins and a slate roof. There are two storeys and six bays. On the north side is a byre door and windows, and in the south side is a small wagon door and windows.	II
Kitchen garden wall and ha-ha, Newbiggin Hall; 54.65243°N 2.58044°W	—	1795	The stone walls are on three sides of the kitchen garden, they have angled copings, and are 15 feet (4.6 m) high. There are doorways in each side with rusticated surrounds and segmental heads; the central door has a dated keystone. On the south side is a ha-ha.	II
Town Head Farmhouse and barn range 54.64885°N 2.57685°W	—	1790s (probable)	The farmhouse is in stone with quoins and a slate roof. There are two storeys, a symmetrical front of three bays, a central door, and sash windows. The barn range to the left was later extended, and it contains various openings, some of which have been altered or blocked.	II
Bridge, Newbiggin Hall; 54.65211°N 2.57924°W		Late 18th to early 19th century	The bridge carries a road over Crowdundle Beck. It is in sandstone, and consists of a single segmental arch. The bridge has a hood mould and parapets with chamfered copings and splayed ends.	II
Sundial; 54.65154°N 2.57859°W	—	Mid 19th century (probable)	The sundial is in the churchyard of St Edmund's Church. It is in stone, and consists of baluster on a stepped base. The plate has survived.	II
Wesleyan Chapel, walls, piers, railings and gate 54.64976°N 2.57685°W		1880	The chapel is in sandstone with quoins, a Welsh slate roof with decorative ridge tiles, pierced bargeboards, and an apex finial. On the front is a gabled porch and a door with a semicircular fanlight. The windows have stone surrounds, semicircular heads, and hood moulds. The forecourt walls have chamfered copings, the gate and end piers have gabled capitals, and the cast iron railings have pierced panels and fleurs-de-lis finials.	II
Wall and gate, Town Head Farmhouse; 54.64891°N 2.57675°W	—	Undated	A low stone wall with triangular coping encloses the forecourt of the farmhouse. It contains a central wrought iron gate.	II
