= Listed buildings in Whitehaven =

Whitehaven is a town and civil parish in the Cumberland district, Cumbria, England. It contains over 170 buildings that are recorded in the National Heritage List for England. Of these, one is listed at Grade I, the highest of the three grades, six are at Grade II*, the middle grade, and the others are at Grade II, the lowest grade.

Whitehaven is a natural port, and the harbour developed in the 17th century mainly for the export of coal from the local mines. During the 18th century the harbour expanded and the town was laid out in a grid plan, often with a building such as a church at the end to provide a vista. During the 20th century the amount of work done by the port declined, and the export of coal finally ended in the 1980s. During this time a number of the town's houses and other buildings were demolished.

Nevertheless, most of the listed buildings are houses and shops of various sizes, many of them in Georgian style. Listed buildings remaining from the industrial past include structures in and around the harbour, warehouses, a former flax mill, and colliery buildings now used as a museum. Other listed buildings include churches, civic buildings, hotels and public houses, banks. air shaft caps providing ventilation for a railway tunnel, and a market hall

== Key ==
Grade	Criteria
I	Buildings of exceptional interest, sometimes considered to be internationally important
II*	Particularly important buildings of more than special interest
II	Buildings of national importance and special interest

== Buildings ==
Name and location	Photograph	Date	Notes	Grade
Old Fort; 54.54985°N 3.59665°W	—	1639	The fort stands between the Old Quay and the Old New Quay, and was built to defend the entrance to the harbour. Only remnants have survived, and they include part of a 19th-century lime kiln that was built into the wall. The area on which the remains are sited is a scheduled monument.	II
54 Roper Street with properties at the rear 54.54711°N 3.58983°W	—	Late 17th century	Largely rebuilt in the 18th century, it is a shop in rendered sandstone with a slate roof. On the front are three storeys and one bay, with a modern shop front in the ground floor, and three-light sash windows in the upper floors. At the rear are former artisans' cottages.	II
Whitehaven Hospital; 54.54544°N 3.58294°W	—	1676–84	A rebuild of an earlier house, it was known as Flatt Hall, and later as Whitehaven Castle. In 1766–75 it was altered and extended by Robert Adam, who turned it round, adding castellations, a bowed centre to the front, and tower-like wings. It has been used as a hospital. The building is symmetrical, in stone, with three storeys and a battlemented parapet. It has a main block with a central semicircular turret, and protruding three-bay wings. Above the windows are hood moulds.	II
Old Custom House; 54.54801°N 3.59195°W	—	1686–87	The building is stuccoed with a cornice, a frieze, and pilasters. There are three storeys, the left part has three symmetrical bays, and the right part has five symmetrical bays. In the left part is a segmental-headed carriage entrance, and in the right part is a central porch with reeded 3/4 columns, a frieze and a cornice. The windows are sashes in moulded architraves.	II
Waverley Hotel; 54.54976°N 3.58778°W	—	1686–87	Wings were added to the hotel in about 1700, and alterations were made in the 19th century. It is stuccoed with cornice bands and a top cornice on brackets. There are three storeys with a basement, and a front of five bays. Steps lead up to a central doorway with pilasters and a pediment on ornamental brackets. The windows are sashes, those in the ground floor with pediments. In the roof are dormers with pedimented gables.	II
Old Quay; 54.55014°N 3.59426°W		1687	The quay was built on the west side of the harbour by Robert Storey, and was extended in 1665 and 1681 by Richard Caton. It has a cobbled surface and contains bollards.	II
Jonathan Swift House; 54.54810°N 3.59788°W	—	c. 1700	The house is in three parts, the latest part dating from about 1800, and it was at one time used as a public house. It is in sandstone with some brick patching, it is pebbledashed, and has slate roofs. The southwest part has a T-shaped plan, one storey and an attic. It has windows of varying types, and has been damaged by fire. The north range is lower, it has two storeys, and contains sash windows. The east range is the latest, and contains modern windows.	II
Town Hall; 54.54800°N 3.58459°W		1708–10	Originally a large house that was much altered and converted into the Town Hall by William Barnes in 1851. There are two storeys and five bays. On the front is a portico with four Doric columns flanked by Venetian windows. In the upper floor are sash windows with cornices on console brackets; the central window also has a curved pediment.	II
Old Quay Lighthouse; 54.55062°N 3.59354°W		1710	The lighthouse has been moved as the quay was extended, and has been in its present position since 1767, It is circular, in stone with a cornice, and is 42 feet (13 m) high. On the lighthouse is a sundial with a gnomon dated 1730.	II
44–45 Irish Street; 54.54577°N 3.59075°W	—	1714–34	The building was altered in the 19th century and extended in the 1900s. It has a U-shaped plan, forming an open courtyard, and is in two storeys with an eaves cornice. In the central block is a slightly projecting porch with a cornice on consoles brackets, and in the roof is a gabled dormer. The windows are sashes, and in the right wing is a shop front.	II
51 Roper Street; 54.54700°N 3.58941°W	—	c. 1715	A shop on a corner site with three storeys and five bays. On the corners are giant fluted pilasters with a honeysuckle motif in the capitals. In the centre is a doorway with fluted pilasters, a plain frieze and a cornice. In the ground floor are shop windows, and above are sash windows in moulded surrounds with sills and small aprons.	II
25 Lowther Street; 54.54788°N 3.58829°W	—	Early 18th century	A shop in three storeys and four bays, with end pilasters, bands, and a dentilled cornice. In the ground floor is a 19th-century shop front, and above are sash windows in moulded architraves.	II
1 Marlborough Street and warehouse 54.54858°N 3.59094°W	—	Early 18th century (probable)	The warehouse at the rear dates probably from the early 19th century. The buildings are stuccoed with three storeys. The house has one bay on Marlborough Street, and one bay on the waterfront. The warehouse has five bays, a loading bay, and external steps to the first floor. (Note: Street View in June 2015 shows that the warehouse has been converted for residential use.)	II
10 Roper Street; 54.54722°N 3.58965°W	—	Early 18th century	Originally the Royal Hotel, later divided into apartments, it has rusticated quoins and a cornice. There are three storeys and four bays. The windows are sashes in moulded architraves.	II
52 Roper Street; 54.54702°N 3.58953°W	—	Early 18th century	A shop in rendered sandstone with a slate roof. It has a double depth plan, three storeys, and three bays. In the ground floor is a shop front dating from about 1900 with a moulded cornice. The windows are sashes with raised stone surrounds.	II
Golden Lion Hotel; 54.54735°N 3.59069°W		Early 18th century	The hotel has three storeys and four bays, corner pilasters and a cornice. The doorway has fluted pilasters, and the windows are sashes.	II
Wall, West Cumberland College; 54.54416°N 3.58555°W	—	Early 18th century	The wall was originally in the garden of Whitehaven Castle, and may date from about 1690. It is in red brick and is about 20 metres (66 ft) long. The wall contains 2.5 semicircular-headed ridges with stone keys.	II
1–16 Church Street; 54.54755°N 3.58896°W	—	1730	A terrace of 16 houses of varying types that were built during the following 20+ years. Most are stuccoed, all have three storeys, and they have differing heights. Most of the windows are sashes, there are some shop windows, and the terrace includes a carriage entrance. Features of some buildings include doorways with pilasters, friezes and cornices, some with steps leading up to the doors, and some with a basement.	II
Strand House; 54.54886°N 3.58987°W	—	c. 1730	The building, on a corner site, is rendered, it has three storeys and a front of three bays. The central doorway has a moulded surround, fluted Ionic pilasters, a dentilled cornice, and a pediment.	II
151 Queen Street and railings 54.54656°N 3.58930°W		c. 1733	Also known as Gale House, it is in Georgian style. There are two storeys and five bays. In the centre, six steps lead up to a panelled door in a doorcase with fluted Ionic pilasters and a cornice. The windows are sashes in architraves. In front of the area and flanking the steps are railings that are included in the listing.	II*
1A, 1–4 and 4A Cross Street; 54.54639°N 3.58974°W	—	c. 1730–40	A terrace of six stuccoed or stone-faced houses in late Georgian style. Nos. 4 and 4A have two storeys, two bays each, twin doorways with pediments, a cornice and a parapet. The other houses have three storeys and cellars, No. 3 has three bays, and the other have two bays each. No 3 has a round-headed doorway with fluted pilasters, a traceried fanlight, and a broken pediment on consoles. No 1 has a rectangular fanlight and a fanlight, and a pediment on consoles.	II
5–9 and 11 Cross Street; 54.54626°N 3.58991°W	—	c. 1730–40	A terrace of six stuccoed houses with three storeys and containing sash windows, those of Nos 9 and 11 having moulded architraves. The doorways of Nos 5 and 11 have pediments, and No 5 also has columns, while No 11 has pilasters.	II
12 Cross Street; 54.54641°N 3.59002°W	—	c. 1730–40	A house in late Georgian style with a frieze and a cornice. There are three storeys and three bays. Steps with railings lead up to a doorway with Doric pilasters and a pediment. The windows are sashes in moulded architraves and stone sills.	II
14 and 15 Howgill Street; 54.54559°N 3.59019°W	—	1736	Built as assembly rooms and later used for other purposes, the building is stuccoed, and has two storeys with a basement and four bays. A double stone stairway leads up to the lower floor, which acts as a piano nobile. The doorway has Tuscan half-columns, a cornice, and a pediment. The windows are sashes.	II*
46–50 Duke Street; 54.54820°N 3.58422°W	—	c. 1740 probable	A terrace of five stuccoed houses with three storeys, No 50 has three bays, and the others have two. All the houses except Nos 48 and 50 have doorways with moulded surrounds and pediments. The windows are sashes with plain architraves.	II
36–38 Roper Street; 54.54643°N 3.58799°W	—	1740	Three stuccoed houses at the end of a terrace, with two storeys, and No. 38 also has an attic. Nos. 37 and 38 have round-headed doorways with semicircular fanlights and broken pediments, and the windows are sashes.	II
Old New Quay; 54.55073°N 3.59744°W		1742	The quay is in stone, and is on the west side of the harbour, extending from the Old Quay. It was lengthened in 1767.	II
30 Roper Street; 54.54638°N 3.58743°W	—	c. 1745	A house on a corner site, it has quoins, three storeys, and four bays on Scotch Street. The front on Roper Street has a doorway with fluted Ionic 3/4 columns on pedestals, an architrave, and a broken ogee pediment containing an acorn and an acanthus motif. To the left is a segmental-arched carriage entrance. On the Scotch Street front are sash windows in architraves.	II
Somerset House; 54.54795°N 3.58347°W		1750	A stone-faced house with bands between the storeys and a parapet. There are three storeys and three bays. A pair of curved staircases lead up to a porch with ornamental wrought iron balustrades, four clustered Gothic columns, and a pediment. All the windows are tripartite without surrounds.	II*
10 College Street; 54.54891°N 3.58791°W	—	18th century	A stuccoed house with three storeys and four bays. The doorway has an architrave and a pediment, and the windows are sashes in moulded architraves and with sills.	II
53 Duke Street; 54.54780°N 3.58373°W	—	18th century	A stuccoed house with two storeys and three bays. The doorway has a pediment on scroll console brackets, and the windows are sashes.	II
11–16 Foxhouses Road; 54.53998°N 3.57696°W	—	18th century	A row of six stuccoed houses. Above the central houses, Nos. 13 and 14, is a pediment, they and No. 15 have four storeys, and the other have three; all the houses have two bays. The central houses have flights of double curving steps with railings leading to a shared Doric portico. The other houses have curved steps leading to doorways with broken pediments. Nos 11 and 12 have attached Composite columns, and Nos 15 and 16 have clustered columns. All the windows are sashes.	II
19, 20 and 20A Foxhouses Road; 54.53958°N 3.57668°W	—	18th century (probable)	Probably originally a single house, later subdivided, it has two low storeys and a rear wing. The house is pebbledashed, and on the front is a doorway with a moulded surround, and windows of varying sizes.	II
12 Front Corkickle; 54.54273°N 3.58012°W	—	Mid 18th century	A stuccoed house at the end of a terrace. There are three storeys and a symmetrical front of five bays. The central doorway has a moulded doorcase with a broken pediment on scrolled console brackets. The windows are sashes.	II
1–11 High Street; 54.55104°N 3.58447°W		Mid 18th century	A terrace of eleven two-storey houses, some pebbledashed and others stuccoed. All the houses have doors approached by steps with iron railings, and sash windows. Most have two bays; Nos 6 and 7 have four. No 6 has a porch with banded triple columns, an entablature and an embattled parapet, and No 7 has a doorcase with Tuscan 3/4 columns and an open pediment.	II
10 Howgill Street and railings 54.54537°N 3.59007°W	—	18th century	A stuccoed house with a cornice, three storeys and three bays. Steps with railings lead up to a doorway that has a rusticated surround, egg and tongue moulding, and a pediment. The windows are sashes in architraves.	II
11 Howgill Street; 54.54544°N 3.59008°W	—	18th century	A stuccoed house with a cornice, three storeys and three bays. Steps lead up to a doorway with a traceried fanlight and a pediment on consoles, and there is an entry door to the left. The windows are sashes in moulded frames.	II
12 Howgill Street; 54.54551°N 3.59010°W	—	18th century	A stuccoed house with a cornice, three storeys and one bay. Steps lead up to a doorway with a plain surround, and the windows are sashes in moulded frames.	II
7 Irish Street; 54.54605°N 3.58998°W	—	18th century	A stuccoed house with three storeys and two bays. The doorway has a moulded architrave and a pediment on console brackets. The windows are sashes in moulded surrounds.	II
17 Irish Street; 54.54613°N 3.58763°W	—	18th century	A stuccoed house with a band, in three storeys and four bays. Three steps lead up to the doorway that has a broken pediment. The windows are sashes, in the ground floor they have pediments with tympani, and in the middle floor are Venetian-shaped cornices and pediments. All the pediments contain foliate decoration.	II
18 Irish Street; 54.54611°N 3.58776°W	—	18th century	A stuccoed house with channel joints in the ground floor and a cornice at the level of the first floor sills. It has three storeys with a basement, and four bays. Steps lead up to the doorway in an architrave that has a cornice on consoles, as do the ground floor windows.	II
41–43 Irish Street; 54.54584°N 3.59045°W	—	Mid 18th century (probable)	A row of three stuccoed houses with three storeys, and No. 43 also has a cellar. No. 41 has four bays, and the other have two each. The windows are sashes in moulded frames. No 41 has a doorway with a pediment, and No 43 has a door with a fanlight and a cornice on consoles.	II
26 Lowther Street; 54.54790°N 3.58832°W		18th century	A shop on a corner site, in four storeys, with one bay on each side, and a canted bay in the centre. There are rusticated pilasters at the ends and corners, and a dentilled cornice. In the ground floor are 19th-century shop fronts and a doorway in the angle. In the upper floors are sash windows, with round windows and swags in the top floor.	II
37 Lowther Street; 54.54871°N 3.59004°W	—	18th century	A shop on a corner site in three storeys with a corner pilaster. In the ground floor is a 19th-century shop front, and above are sash windows.	II
38 Lowther Street; 54.54873°N 3.59011°W	—	18th century	A stuccoed house in a terrace with three storeys and one bay. Three steps lead up to a round-headed doorway with a moulded surround and a traceried fanlight. There is a triple sash window in each floor.	II
39–42 Lowther Street; 54.54879°N 3.59020°W	—	18th century	A row of four stuccoed houses with three storeys. All have doorways with pediments, that of No. 39 is on consoles, and Nos. 41 and 42 also have pilasters. The windows are sashes, some are triple, and No 42 has an oriel window in the middle floor.	II
44–47 Lowther Street; 54.54893°N 3.59005°W	—	18th century	A row of four stuccoed houses with three storeys and cellars. Nos. 44 and 45 are mirror images, with two bays each, and No, 44 also has steps leading down to a cellar. Nos 46 and 47 are larger, with steps leading up to doorways. No 47 has a moulded doorcase, a detached pediment, and triple sash windows, and No 47 has a round-headed doorway with a fanlight with a moulded arch on consoles. All the windows are sashes.	II
78 and 79 Lowther Street; 54.54682°N 3.58538°W	—	Mid 18th century	A pair of stuccoed buildings with a moulded cornice, a slate roof, and three storeys. No 78 has two bays and a modern shop front on the ground floor. No, 79 has six bays, steps with railings leading up to a doorway with a moulded surround, and a cornice on consoles, and with a yard entrance at the right. All the windows are sashes with moulded surrounds.	II
80 Lowther Street; 54.54671°N 3.58512°W	—	Mid 18th century	A stuccoed building with a rusticated plinth and quoins, and a moulded cornice. There are two storeys and six bays, the central two bays projecting forward. In the centre is a doorway flanked by windows and approached by steps; it has pilasters, a frieze with triglyphs and metopes, and a cornice and an open pediment broken by a round-headed doorway. The windows are sashes in moulded architraves.	II
16 and 17 Queen Street; 54.54679°N 3.58891°W	—	Mid 18th century	A pair of stuccoed houses with three storeys. No. 16 has one bay, and No. 17 has three. The doors are panelled and the windows are sashes.	II
132 Queen Street; 54.54785°N 3.58722°W	—	18th century	A stuccoed building on a plinth, with a band between the ground and middle floor, pilasters from there to the eaves with a frieze and a cornice. There are three storeys, three bays, and a central doorway that has a moulded architrave and a cornice on consoles. The windows are sashes, the window above the doorway having a moulded architrave and a cornice on consoles. To the left is a carriage entrance with a segmental head and surmounted by open arcading.	II
19 and 20 Roper Street; 54.54678°N 3.58844°W	—	18th century	Two adjoining buildings on a corner site, stuccoed, with three storeys. No. 19 has a gable end on Roper Street. In the ground floor of No. 20 is a double-fronted wooden shop front and a doorway to the right. The windows are triple-sashes, with three in each upper floor and one on the ground floor.	II
21 and 22 Roper Street; 54.54672°N 3.58830°W	—	18th century	A pair of houses with three storeys and basements, and each house has three bays. Five steps lead up to each doorway, and the windows are sashes with sills.	II
23 and 24 Roper Street; 54.54668°N 3.58814°W	—	18th century	A pair of mirror-image houses in a terrace, they are stuccoed, with Ionic pilasters at the ends, and a moulded eaves cornice. There are three storeys, and each house has three bays. Six steps with cast iron railings lead up to doorways in the inner bays. Each of the doorways has Doric pilasters, and a broken semicircular pediments containing a 3/4 urn. The windows are sashes in plain architraves.	II
25 Roper Street; 54.54661°N 3.58800°W	—	18th century	A pebbledashed house with rusticated quoins, it has three storeys and two bays. Four steps lead up to a doorway that has a moulded surround with a cornice, and a pediment on fluted consoles. The windows are triple sashes.	II
28 Roper Street; 54.54650°N 3.58769°W	—	18th century	A warehouse in stone rubble with six storeys and three bays. In the central bay is a door in each storey. (Note: Street View in June 2015 shows that the warehouse has been converted to residential use.)	II
1–3 Scotch Street; 54.54648°N 3.58728°W	—	18th century	A row of three stuccoed houses with three storeys, three bays each, and quoins at the right end. Steps lead up to the doorways that have moulded architraves, fanlights, and pediments. The doorway of No 1 has a round head and a traceried fanlight.	II
4–8 Scotch Street; 54.54674°N 3.58694°W	—	18th century	A terrace of five houses in three storeys, with quoins at the ends. The doorway of No 6 has an elliptical headed fanlight with a keystone and shell ornament. Some of the windows have moulded architraves.	II
9 and 10 Scotch Street; 54.54684°N 3.58681°W	—	18th century	A pair of stuccoed houses at the end of a terrace. They have three storeys and cellars, and each house has two bays. At the right end are quoins, steps lead up to the doorways, and the windows are sashes.	II
Bonded Warehouse; 54.54781°N 3.58924°W	—	18th century	The warehouse is in stone rubble with a slate roof. It has a long rectangular plan, with the entrance at the west end. Inside there is a cellar with barrel vaults and arched stone cells for bottles.	II
Chapel House; 54.52940°N 3.56876°W	—	18th century	A pebbledashed house with a slate roof in two storeys. On the front is a modern verandah. At the rear, facing the road, is a round-headed stair window with Gothic glazing. The windows are sashes, and to the south is a lower wing with a lean-to porch.	II
College Chambers; 54.54876°N 3.58755°W	—	18th century	A stuccoed house on a corner site, it has two storeys, cellars and attics. On the Church Street front are three bays with sash windows, the basement windows being half-sashes. On the College Street front are irregular windows, and a doorway with a pediment on console brackets, and on the corner are rusticated quoins.	II
Greenbank Hotel; 54.52515°N 3.58284°W	—	Mid 18th century	The hotel is stuccoed, and has two storeys and five bays. On the front is a doorway with Tuscan three-quarter columns, an entablature and a pediment. There are two two-storey bay windows, and the other windows are sashes.	II
Kirk Mission Hall; 54.55022°N 3.58270°W	—	Mid 18th century	Originally a Nonconformist church and later a Methodist church, it is in sandstone, partly rendered, and has a Welsh slate roof with stone copings. The front facing the street has two storeys and four bays, and contains two tall windows with semicircular heads. On the right gable is a flat-topped bellcote. To the southeast of the church is a burial ground that has a boundary wall with saddleback coping, and it contains square gate piers.	II
Masonic Hall; 54.54891°N 3.58790°W	—	18th century	The building is pebbledashed with quoins, three storeys and four bays. The doorway has a fanlight with Gothic tracery, and a pediment on consoles. The windows are sashes in architraves.	II
43 Queen Street; 54.54933°N 3.58563°W	—	c. 1750	The house is in pebbledashed sandstone, and has rusticated quoins and a moulded cornice. There are three storeys with a basement, and a symmetrical front of five bays. Five steps lead up to a central doorway with a moulded surround, and the windows are sashes in moulded architraves.	II
St James' Church; 54.55080°N 3.58348°W		1752–53	The church is in Neoclassical style, the apse was restored in 1871, the interior was reordered in 1886, a chapel was created within the church in 1921 followed by a baptistry in 1992, and an internal glass west door was installed in about 1995. The church is built in stone, with quoins and the roofs are slated. It consists of a two-storey nave, an elliptical apse at the east end, and a west tower incorporating a porch and embraced by the nave. The tower has three stages, a corbelled cornice, a plain parapet, and obelisk pinnacles. Along the sides of the church are two tiers of rectangular windows, and in the apse are blocked Venetian windows. Inside the church are galleries on three sides carried on Doric columns, and in the apse is a painting of the Transfiguration by Giulio Cesare Procaccini.	I
Gate piers and lamp holders, St James' Church; 54.55062°N 3.58369°W		1752–53	The gate piers are opposite the west front of the church at the entrance from the street. They are square, in stone, and have cornices. There was formerly a wrought iron lamp holder on the cross bar.	II
Gate and Railings, St Nicholas Gardens; 54.54890°N 3.58660°W	—	1755	The gate and railings at the entrance to the gardens are in wrought iron. The gates are hung between two tall narrow open scroll panels that act as gate posts, and between them is a decorative overthrow containing a crest and a wyvern finial. The gates are flanked by railings on dwarf stone walls.	II
1 Lowther Street; 54.54630°N 3.58488°W	—	1750s	A stuccoed house with rusticated quoins, a cornice and a parapet. There are two storeys, a basement and an attic, and a symmetrical front of five bays. The central doorway has Tuscan pilasters and a triangular pediment. The windows are sashes in plain surrounds.	II
35 Queen Street; 54.54893°N 3.58608°W	—	c. 1760	A stuccoed house on a corner site, with rusticated quoins, and three storeys. The round-headed doorway on Queen Street has Tuscan pilasters, a shell hood, a keystone, and flanking sidelights. Above is a small window in each floor. On the Duke Street front are three sash windows in each floor.	II
14 Scotch Street; 54.54744°N 3.58606°W		c. 1760	A stuccoed house with quoins and a balustrade. There are two storeys, a centre part of five bays with flanking bays. The central three bays project forward, they are rusticated, and they contain a central doorway that has attached fluted Ionic columns, a pulvinated frieze, and a pediment. The windows are sashes in architraves.	II*
71 and 72 George Street; 54.54882°N 3.58419°W	—	Georgian	A square building on a corner site, with three storeys and an attic, three bays on George Street, and one on Scotch Street. It has a moulded cornice, a parapet, and a gable on George Street. The doorway has fluted half-columns, a cornice, and a fanlight. Above the doorway is a tall stair window, and the other windows are sashes.	II
44 and 45 Roper Street; 54.54682°N 3.58893°W		Georgian	A pair of buildings in Gothic style, with two storeys and attics. In the ground floor are four doorways with pointed arches and decorated blind fanlights, and three shop windows with four-centred heads, hood moulds, and foliated spandrels. Between the floors is a cornice, and in the upper floor are windows with moulded frames with hood moulds. No 44 has attic windows, and No 45 has embattled eaves.	II*
Whitehaven Hall; 54.54658°N 3.58909°W	—	1710	A stuccoed house with four storeys, and five bays. In the centre is a doorway with Tuscan columns, a plain frieze, and a cornice. The windows are sashes, with four in the lower ground floor, four on the ground floor, five in the middle floor, and three in the top floor.	II
152–155 Queen Street; 54.54656°N 3.58949°W	—	Georgian	A row of four shops and houses, stuccoed, with three storeys. No. 152 has a gable, quoins, a plain doorway, one window in each floor, that in the middle floor with a cornice, and above the top window is a curved pediment. The other buildings have moulded doorways with pediments. No 153 has three bays and a cellar. The other two buildings have two bays, and No 154 has a shop window in the ground floor. All the other windows are sashes.	II
Watch House; 54.55054°N 3.59362°W		1764	The watch house stands on the Old Quay, and is in sandstone with a slate roof. There are two storeys and two bays, with a single-bay extension to the left. There are doors in the ground floor, and casement windows above. On the left side are external steps leading up to a first floor door.	II
4–8 Garden Villas; 54.53675°N 3.56722°W	—	Late 18th century	A symmetrical terrace of four houses in Gothic style. They have two storeys and two bays each. Each house has a doorway with a pointed head and a rectangular hood mould with panelled spandrels, and above the windows are hood moulds. Over Nos 1 and 4 are gables with fretted bargeboards, and with a window in the gable.	II
29 Roper Street; 54.54641°N 3.58756°W	—	Late 18th century	A house in Gothic style, with a balustraded parapet and a double-curved Dutch gable. There are three storeys and three bays. The house has a moulded doorway with a dentilled cornice. The windows in the middle floor have square hood moulds.	II
112 Scotch Street; 54.54652°N 3.58678°W	—	Late 18th century	A rendered stone house, formerly a shop, with a slate roof. It has a double depth plan, three storeys, and four bays. There are pilasters flanking the doorway on the left and at the right end. Between the ground and middle floors is a cornice, between the floors above is a band, and at the top is a cornice and a parapet. The windows are sashes in plain surrounds.	II
113 Scotch Street; 54.54648°N 3.58687°W	—	Late 18th century	A rendered stone house with a concrete tile roof. There are three storeys with a cellar and three bays. Steps lead up to the round-headed doorway that has a fanlight and an open pediment. On the front is a blocked cellar door, and to the right an entry doorway with an architrave. The windows are sashes in plain surrounds.	II
Meadow House; 54.53919°N 3.57717°W	—	Late 18th century	A stuccoed house in two storeys. In the front facing the road are two gables, and a central porch with four square Tuscan columns and a cornice. There is a sash window in each gable and a small window above the porch. In the right return is a round-headed stair window, and in the left return are four sash windows in each floor.	II
15 and 16 Catherine Street; 54.54715°N 3.58429°W	—	c. 1780 (probable)	A pair of mirror-image stuccoed houses. They have three storeys with basements, and each house has three bays. Three steps with railings lead up to the doorways that are paired in the centre; they have moulded surrounds, and cornices on consoles. The windows are sashes, and to the right is a round-arched carriage entrance.	II
30–35 Church Street; 54.54885°N 3.58741°W	—	c. 1780	A terrace of six stuccoed houses of varying height. No. 32 has two storeys and the other houses have three storeys. Nos. 30 and 31 have a rusticated bands between the ground and middle floors. The windows in the ground floor of No 32 are casements, and all the others are sashes.	II
49 Church Street; 54.54965°N 3.58606°W	—	c. 1780	A stuccoed house at the end of a terrace, with three storeys and two bays. The doorway and sash windows have moulded surrounds, and above the door is a cornice.	II
50 Church Street; 54.54963°N 3.58609°W	—	c. 1780	A stuccoed house in a terrace, it has three storeys. The openings have moulded surrounds, and above the door is a cornice and a pediment.	II
51–53 Church Street; 54.54959°N 3.58612°W	—	c. 1780	Three houses forming part of a terrace. They are stuccoed with three storeys, No. 51 has one bay, and the others have two each. The doorway of No 51 has a cornice on consoles, and that of No 53 has a pediment.	II
54–57 and 57A Church Street; 54.54941°N 3.58640°W	—	c. 1780	A terrace of five stuccoed houses, with three storeys and two bays each. The doorways and sash windows have moulded surrounds, and the doorways of Nos 57 and 57A share a cornice on scroll brackets.	II
Old North Wall and North Wall; 54.55167°N 3.59287°W	—	1785	The north wall enclosing the harbour was originally designed by John Smeaton, and it was extended in 1814.	II
4 and 5 Foxhouses Road; 54.54090°N 3.57750°W	—	c. 1790	A pair of mirror-image semi-detached houses, with corner and central pilasters. No. 4 is stuccoed and No. 5 is pebbledashed. The houses have three storeys with basements and two bays each. Curved flights of stairs with railings lead up to the central doorway that has a portico with three Doric columns, and doors with traceried fanlights. The windows are sashes on moulded architraves.	II
6 and 7 Foxhouses Road; 54.54075°N 3.57743°W	—	c. 1790	A pair of houses with a cornice, No. 6 is stuccoed, and No. 7 is pebbledashed. They have two storeys and basements, and each house has two bays. Steps lead up to doorways in the outer bays that have round-arched doorways, fanlights, broken pediments, panelled pilasters, and scroll brackets. The windows are sashes in plain architraves.	II
The Distressed Sailor; 54.53143°N 3.56874°W	—	c. 1790	A public house, stuccoed, with a slate roof. There are two storeys, the main part has four bays, with a projecting two-bay wing to the right. The windows are sashes.	II
22 and 23 Foxhouses Road; 54.53939°N 3.57665°W	—	Late Georgian	A pair of roughcast cottages with two storeys. The windows are sashes, with four in the upper floor and three in the ground floor.	II
1–4 Front Corkickle; 54.54329°N 3.58130°W	—	Late Georgian	Four houses at the end of a terrace, No. 3 is pebbledashed and the others are stuccoed. No. 4 has two storeys, and the others have two storeys with basements; all the houses have two bays. All the doorways are round-headed with fanlights, Nos 1–3 have rusticated surrounds, and No four has a traceries fanlight and a broken pediment. The windows are sashes, and at the rear are long staircase windows.	II
5 and 6 Front Corkickle; 54.54315°N 3.58097°W	—	Late Georgian	A pair of stuccoed houses in a terrace. They have two storeys, and each house has a symmetrical front of three bays. Steps lead up to central doorway with broken pediments, and the windows are sashes.	II
9–11 Front Corkickle; 54.54286°N 3.58034°W	—	Late Georgian	A row of three stuccoed houses, with two storeys and three bays each. All have round-headed doorways with fanlights. The doorways of Nos 9 and 10 have Tuscan three-quarter columns and broken pediments. The windows are sashes.	II
1–6 Hamilton Terrace; 54.54208°N 3.57800°W	—	Late Georgian	A terrace of six stuccoed houses, with two storeys and two bays each. The ground floor is rusticated, and at the top is a cornice, a parapet, and with urns at the ends. Each house has an Ionic porch with a frieze and a cornice. The windows are sashes.	II
7–19 Lonsdale Place; 54.55905°N 3.57837°W	—	Late Georgian	A terrace of 13 stuccoed houses of varying types, with slate roofs. They are all in two storeys, and have sash windows and fanlights. Above the doorways of Nos 7 and 8 are broken pediments, and No 11 has a two-storey bay window, a balustrade, and a segmental-arched carriage entrance.	II
1–3 Retreat; 54.53927°N 3.57507°W	—	Late Georgian	A row of three houses with two storeys, basements, a cornice and a parapet. No. 3 is pebbledashed, and the others are stuccoed. No. 1 has two bays and a round-arched doorway with a broken pediment. The other houses have three bays each and a Doric porch.	II
Wellington House; 54.55104°N 3.58580°W	—	Late Georgian	A stuccoed house in late Georgian style with Gothic details, it has two storeys with an attic and a basement. The entrance front has three bays with a pedimented gable, a central doorway with a Gothic arch and a cornice, and the windows are sashes.	II
1 and 2 Foxhouses Road; 54.54138°N 3.57785°W	—	c. 1800	A pair of semi-detached pebbledashed houses, with two storeys with attics, and three bays each. Steps lead up to central doorways that have a Gothic porch with an embattled parapet. Above the doors are traceried fanlights, and No 1 has an iron verandah along its front. The windows have mullions, transoms and hood moulds. In each roof are three attic dormers.	II
Barracks Mill; 54.54510°N 3.58809°W		1809	This originated as a fireproof flax mill. It is in limestone with a moulded cornice and concrete pantile roofs, and has four storeys. In the centre is a projecting pedimented wing containing the engine house, which is flanked by seven bays on each side. The windows have segmental arches with keystones and contain casements. The mill has been converted into flats.	II*
West Pier; 54.55177°N 3.59916°W		1824–32	The pier on the west side of the harbour was designed by John Rennie. The builders deviated from the plan, and part of it had to be rebuilt according to the plan.	II
96 and 97 Duke Street; 54.54905°N 3.58720°W	—	Early 19th century	A pair of shops with shop fronts in the ground floor and stuccoed above. They have three storeys, No. 97 has two bays and a cornice, and No 96 has three bays.	II
70 George Street; 54.54870°N 3.58392°W	—	Early 19th century	A stuccoed house on a corner site, with a cornice on brackets, and a hipped slate roof. There are two storeys, and a basement on the Scotch Street front. On George Street is a central doorway with a moulded surround, a fanlight, and a cornice on curved brackets, and above it is a fixed window. On the Scotch Street front is a similar doorway and sash windows.	II
66 Lowther Street; 54.54767°N 3.58719°W	—	Early 19th century	Originally the Clydesdale Bank, and later used for other purposes, it is ashlar with angle pilasters, a cornice and a balustrade. There are two storeys and four bays, with an Ionic porch in the fourth bay. The windows are sashes in architraves, those in the ground floor also having cornices.	II
81–83 Lowther Street; 54.54656°N 3.58478°W	—	Early 19th century	A row of three stuccoed houses, on moulded plinths, and with eaves cornices. No. 81 has two storeys, five bays, and a central doorway with Doric pilasters and an entablature, No 82 has three storeys, five bays, quoins, a central doorway with three-quarter Doric columns and a pediment, and No 83 has two storeys, four bays, and a doorway similar to that of No 81. All the windows are sashes.	II
89–95 Main Street; 54.53658°N 3.56762°W	—	Early 19th century	A row of stuccoed houses with two storeys, with roofs in slate or stone-slate. The windows are sashes.	II
56 Roper Street; 54.54715°N 3.58998°W	—	Early 19th century	At the front is a rendered sandstone shop with a slate roof. There are three storeys, with a shop front in the ground floor. The main part has three bays, an end pilaster with a Composite capital, bands between the storeys, and a moulded eaves cornice. To the left is a two-bay range, without these features. The windows are sashes, and at the rear are outbuildings and a warehouse.	II
4 and 5 Duke Street; 54.54984°N 3.58868°W	—	First half of 19th century	A pair of roughcast houses with a slate roof, in three storeys and with two bays each. Steps lead up to round-headed doorways with fanlights. The windows are sashes with plain stone frames.	II
15–19 Front Corkickle; 54.54251°N 3.57966°W	—	First half of 19th century	A terrace of five stuccoed houses. Nos. 15 and 16 have three storeys, and Nos. 17–19 have two. The houses are of similar height, and each has two bays. The doorways have cornices on consoles, and Nos 18 and 19 share twin pediments. The windows are sashes in moulded architraves.	II
83–87 George Street; 54.54967°N 3.58579°W	—	First half of 19th century	A terrace of stuccoed houses with slate roofs, in two storeys and with two or three bays each. No 87 has a round-headed doorway, and the windows in the other houses, which are sashes, have moulded cornices on brackets.	II
1 Hamilton Lane; 54.54799°N 3.59204°W	—	First half of 19th century	A stuccoed house at the end of a row, it has three storeys with a basement. In each floor is a single and a double sash window, all in plain stone architraves. The door is on the side.	II
46–49A Roper Street; 54.54688°N 3.58911°W	—	First half of 19th century	A row of shops, stuccoed, and in three storeys. In the ground floor are shop fronts, and above there are sash windows.	II
84–95 Scotch Street; 54.54848°N 3.58424°W	—	First half of 19th century	A terrace of twelve houses running down a hill, with stepped roofs. They have three storeys, panelled doors with rectangular fanlights, sash windows in architraves, and most have two bays.	II
43 and 44 Duke Street; 54.54842°N 3.58476°W	—	1830	A pebbledashed office in late Georgian style, with end pilasters, a cornice, and a parapet. There are three storeys and six bays. Five steps lead up to the doorway that has Tuscan pilasters, a cornice, and a pediment. The windows are sashes with moulded architraves.	II
1–3 Victoria Terrace; 54.54244°N 3.58012°W	—	c. 1830 (probable)	A terrace of three stuccoed houses with two storeys and attics, and a front of seven bays. The terrace has a cornice, a band, double pilasters, and roof dormers. On the ground floor are four bay windows, and above are seven windows, two of which are triple sashes with pediments. No 1 has a Tuscan portico with two columns.	II
8 Front Corkickle; 54.54300°N 3.58062°W	—	Late Georgian to early Victorian	A stuccoed house with two storeys, a basement and attics. It has a symmetrical front of three bays. Steps lead up to a central doorway that has a Tuscan with a pediment. The windows are sashes, the upper floor windows having decorative balconies, and in the roof are two attic dormers.	II
Wall and railings, 8 Front Corkickle; 54.54292°N 3.58069°W	—	Late Georgian to early Victorian	Surrounding the area in front of the house, and flanking the steps leading to the doorway, are iron railings on a low wall, and a small gate.	II
38–48 Main Street; 54.53712°N 3.56732°W	—	Late Georgian to early Victorian	A terrace of eleven houses, Nos. 40–44 are pebbledashed, and the others are stuccoed. No. 48 has three storeys, a two-storey canted bay window, and a porch, and all the other houses have two storeys. All houses have two bays and round-headed doorways with fanlights. The windows are sashes, and some have hood moulds.	II
81–87 Main Street; 54.53736°N 3.56579°W	—	Late Georgian to early Victorian	A terrace of seven stuccoed houses with two storeys. No. 81 has four bays and the others have three bays each. Most of the windows are sashes, and No 82 has a bay window. Nos 86 and 87 have cellars and Doric doorways approached by steps.	II
West Pier Lighthouse; 54.55281°N 3.59857°W		1832	The lighthouse is a tapering stone cylinder that has a gallery with railings, and a glazed lantern surmounted by an ogee roof and a ball finial.	II
Savings Bank; 54.54835°N 3.58871°W	—	1833	The bank, designed by Thomas Rickman in Neoclassical style, is stuccoed, and has two storeys and a front of three bays. On the front is a portico with four partly fluted Doric columns, a plain entablature, and a cast iron balustrade. In the upper floor the bays are divided by pilasters, and there are double pilasters at the ends. The windows have moulded architraves and cornices, and above the middle bay is an entablature and the Royal Arms. On the left return there are two bays, and beyond that is a house, No 42 New Street, that has three storeys and two bays.	II
105 and 105A Duke Street and 1 and 2 King Street; 54.54941°N 3.58814°W	—	Early to mid 19th century	A stuccoed shop on a corner site, with three storeys, three bays on Duke Street, four on King Street, and a chamfered bay between. In the ground floor is an Edwardian shop front. The corner bay contains a round-headed doorway and a round-headed window in the middle floor. The windows in the middle floor have cornices on consoles.	II
55 Roper Street; 54.54711°N 3.58989°W	—	Early to mid 19th century	A shop in rendered sandstone, with three storeys and three bays. In the ground floor is a shop front with an entry doorway to the left. Above, there are two sash windows in the middle floor, and three in the top floor.	II
3 Foxhouses Road; 54.54107°N 3.57762°W	—	c. 1840	A stuccoed house with rusticated quoins, two storeys with attics, and three bays. In the centre is a round-headed doorway with a Doric porch, and above it is a sash window with a segmental head, a keystone and a cornice. In the outer bays are two-storey bay windows with cornices, and in the attics are dormers.	II
1–10 Oak Bank; 54.55520°N 3.57936°W	—	c. 1840	A terrace of stuccoed houses with their backs to the road. They have three storeys and two bays each. In each house steps lead up to a moulded doorcase with a cornice on mask consoles. In the ground floor is a bay window, and in the upper floor are two sash windows, the window above the bay window in a moulded architrave with a cornice on consoles. The houses in the centre and at the ends are gabled.	II
19 and 20 Irish Street, coach house entrance and railings 54.54607°N 3.58805°W	—	c. 1845	A house designed by Sydney Smirke in Italianate style, it has a rusticated ground floor, and is stuccoed above. The house has a large eaves cornice with a moulded frieze and modillions. There are three storeys and six bays. The windows in the middle floor have moulded architraves, pediments on consoles, and balconies on brackets, and the windows in the top floor are casements. Enclosing the front is balustrading. To the left is the entrance to the coach house with two storeys and four bays, round-headed windows, modillion eaves and a pierced balustrade.	II
17 and 18 Foxhouses Road; 54.53976°N 3.57682°W	—	Victorian	A pair of semi-detached houses, stuccoed, with high basements and two storeys above, and with end pilasters. Flights of steps from each side lead up to a shared porch with three Composite columns, a decorated frieze, a cornice, and a pediment. Flanking this are three-storey bay windows with panels between the storeys, and above the doors are sash windows.	II
57 and 58 Roper Street; 54.54723°N 3.59016°W	—	Victorian	A highly decorated building in three storeys and five bays. Between the central doorway and the ground floor windows are Composite pilasters, and above them is a panelled frieze and a cornice. The windows in the middle floor have alternate curved and triangular pediments containing masks and cartouches. At the top of the building are horizontal round-ended openings.	II
Marine Terrace; 54.55437°N 3.57996°W	—	Victorian	A terrace of six houses with their backs to the road. They are stuccoed, and have three storeys. Each house has a doorway with a moulded surround and a cornice, and a bay window with mullions, a cornice and sashes. In the upper floor are two sash windows, one in an architrave and with a cornice. At the rear are round-headed stair windows and kitchen wings.	II
Union Hall; 54.54701°N 3.58658°W	—	Victorian	A stuccoed building with rusticated quoins, a cornice on brackets, and two decorated pediments. It is in two and three storeys and has a front of seven bays. The windows are sashes in moulded architraves, some with cornices. To the right is a round-headed doorway with attached Tuscan columns, and a broken pediment. To the left is a larger doorway with free-standing Composite columns on pedestals, a frieze and a cornice.	II
17 and 18 Howgill Street; 54.54586°N 3.59021°W	—	19th century	A house and a shop on a corner site, pebbledashed with plaster strips on the corners and three storeys. The windows are sashes in plain architraves.	II
1 and 2 Inkerman Terrace; 54.54150°N 3.57710°W	—	19th century	A pair of detached houses, stuccoed, and in two storeys. The doorways are paired in the centre, and share a cornice on consoles. They are flanked by canted bay windows, and in the upper floor are round-headed windows.	II
13 and 14 Inkerman Terrace; 54.54029°N 3.57584°W	—	Mid 19th century	A pair of detached houses, stuccoed, with a cornice, and in two storeys with attics. In the centre is a portico with Tuscan columns, and this is flanked by bay windows.	II
15 and 16 Inkerman Terrace; 54.54016°N 3.57559°W	—	Mid 19th century	A pair of detached houses, stuccoed, with a cornice, and in two storeys. In the centre is a porch with square piers. The windows are sashes with cornices; in the ground floor they are triple sashes.	II
17 and 18 Inkerman Terrace; 54.54003°N 3.57532°W	—	Mid 19th century	A pair of detached houses, stuccoed, with a cornice, and in two storeys. In the centre is a porch with square piers. The windows are sashes with cornices; in the ground floor they are triple sashes.	II
4 and 5 Irish Street; 54.54603°N 3.59012°W	—	19th century	A pair of roughcast houses in a terrace with a slate roof. There are three storeys, No. 4 has three bays, and No. 5 has two. The doorways are round-headed with imposts, keystones, and fanlights. The windows are sashes, and here is a round-arched entry to the right.	II
7–17 Lowther Street; 54.54781°N 3.58814°W	—	19th century	A row of stuccoed shops in three storeys, with modern shop fronts in the ground floor and sash windows above. No. 9 has moulded architraves, and No 10 has cornices on ornamented brackets, and a top cornice on brackets.	II
22–24 Lowther Street; 54.54781°N 3.58814°W	—	19th century	A row of shops in three storeys. There are modern shop fronts in the ground floor, and above they are stuccoed, and contain sash windows in plain architraves.	II
35–37 Main Street and coach house 54.53671°N 3.56793°W	—	Mid 19th century	A row of three houses with a coach house to the right, stuccoed with a slate roof, and in two storeys. Nos 35 and 36 have two bays, sash windows in plain architraves, one on the ground floor and two above. No 37 is taller with three bays, end pilasters, a cornice, and a round-headed doorway with a moulded surround, a fanlight and a keystone. The coach house is lower with a central wide entrance, an entrance with a four-centred arch to the right, a doorway and a stair window to the left, and sashes above.	II
133 Queen Street; 54.54774°N 3.58731°W	—	Mid 19th century	Originally the Westminster Bank and later used for other purposes, the building is on a corner site. It is in stone with a rusticated ground floor, a frieze, a modillioned cornice, and a balustraded parapet. There are three storeys, four bays on Queen Street, and three on Lowther Street. The windows are sashes, those in the upper floor having round heads. On the Lowther Street front is a balcony with a balustrade on consoles.	II
31A and 31B Scotch Street; 54.54859°N 3.58447°W	—	19th century	A pair of stuccoed houses, with three storeys and two bays each. The doorways, in the centre, both have a cornice, and there is a double sash window in a moulded architrave in each floor.	II
32–35 Scotch Street; 54.54872°N 3.58434°W	—	19th century	A terrace of four houses, partly stuccoed and partly roughcast, in three storeys and with a cornice. No 35 has a doorway with a plain architrave, the others have pediments, and all the windows are sashes. The houses have two or three bays, and No 32 also has a two-storey wing over a carriage entrance at the left.	II
Former Globe Hotel; 54.54955°N 3.58851°W	—	Mid 19th century (probable)	A stuccoed building with a cornice on paired brackets and corner pilasters. There are three storeys, a main block of four bays, and a taller wing to the right with two bays. On the front is a portico with two round Roman Doric columns and a cornice.	II
Pack Horse Public House; 54.54818°N 3.58887°W	—	19th century	The public house is stuccoed with three low storeys. The doorway has pilasters, a frieze, a cornice, a moulded doorcase, and a fanlight. The windows are sashes in moulded frames.	II
Air shaft cap 54.55056°N 3.58392°W	—	1852	The air shaft cap was built to ventilate a former tunnel for the Whitehaven and Furness Junction Railway under Whitehaven Castle and part of the town. It is in red brick, and has a stone parapet.	II
Air shaft cap 54.54722°N 3.58175°W	—	1852	The air shaft cap was built to ventilate a former tunnel for the Whitehaven and Furness Junction Railway under Whitehaven Castle. It is in engineering brick, and has a stone string course and pseudo-embattled coping.	II
Air shaft cap 54.54850°N 3.58245°W	—	1852	The air shaft cap was built to ventilate a former tunnel for the Whitehaven and Furness Junction Railway under Whitehaven Castle. It is in red brick, and has a stone string course and pseudo-embattled coping.	II
Air shaft cap 54.54630°N 3.58154°W	—	1852	The air shaft cap was built to ventilate a former tunnel for the Whitehaven and Furness Junction Railway under Whitehaven Castle. It is in red brick and has moulded coping.	II
Air shaft cap 54.54493°N 3.58155°W	—	1852	The air shaft cap was built to ventilate a former tunnel for the Whitehaven and Furness Junction Railway under Whitehaven Castle. It is in red brick and has a circular plan. This was the only shaft visible from the castle, it is surrounded by iron railings on a stone plinth, and its uprights and main verticals have crocketed heads.	II
Former Co-operative Store; 54.54977°N 3.58844°W		1856 or later	The shop has since been used for other purposes. It is stuccoed with three storeys, a cornice, a frieze, a balustraded parapet, and a decorated pediment on Duke Street. There are modern shop fronts in the ground floor, and in the upper floors are pairs of Composite pilasters that are partly fluted. In the middle floor, the windows have scroll cornices. There are seven windows on the Duke Street face, and four on Tangier Street.	II
Former Shakespeare Public House; 54.54704°N 3.58967°W	—	c. 1860s	The building is in rendered sandstone, with a bracketed eaves cornice. There are three storeys and four bays. In the ground floor are three windows and an entry doorway. all with round heads, and joined by a continuous moulded impost band. The windows in the upper floors are sashes, those in the middle floor having flat arches and joined by a continuous moulded impost band. (Note: Street View in June 2015 shows that the building has been converted for residential use.)	II
St Begh's Church; 54.54275°N 3.58427°W	—	1865–68	A Roman Catholic church by E. W. Pugin, in sandstone with a tile roof. It consists of a nave with a clerestory, aisles ending in chapels, a chancel with a three-sided apse, and a north vestry. The west end has buttresses, and a central entrance with a pointed doorway. Above the doorway are three lancet windows, and in the gable is a statue of an angel. The windows along the aisles are wide with Geometric tracery, and in the clerestory are quatrefoils.	II
7 Front Corkickle; 54.54307°N 3.58075°W	—	1874	A stuccoed house in a terrace, with ornate decoration. It has three storeys with a basement, and three bays. Steps lead up to a doorway with three-quarter Composite columns. This is flanked by two-storey bay windows with arched lights, Composite colonnets, and iron-work friezes. In the top floor are three sash windows.	II
Methodist Church and Sunday School; 54.54716°N 3.58586°W		1877	The church, designed by TL Banks, is in sandstone with ashlar dressings and slate roofs, and is in late 13th-century Gothic style. The church has a cruciform plan, with an apse and a southwest tower. At the rear is a meeting room, a custodian's flat, and a former Sunday school, now used for other purposes.	II
Market Hall; 54.54730°N 3.59133°W		1881	The market hall was designed by TL Banks, and replaced an earlier, smaller hall by Robert Smirke. It is in stuccoed brick, and has two storeys. The entrance from Market Place has a clock tower with a domed roof.	II
St Nicholas Centre; 54.54813°N 3.58766°W		1883	The church replaced an earlier church on the site. It was designed by C. J. Ferguson, but was largely destroyed by fire in 1971. The significant remains were converted into a centre for worship and for the community. The building is in Egremont sandstone and has slate roofs, and the remaining parts consist of the tower, a porch and transepts. The tower has three stages with string courses between the stages, a clock face on the west side, and an embattled parapet, and to the southwest is a projecting stair turret. Inside the porch is the doorway of the 1693 church.	II
Whittle's Furniture Store; 54.54967°N 3.58806°W	—	1899	A stuccoed shop in three storeys with five bays. At the ends are pairs of pilasters with Tuscan and Corinthian features. The first floor windows in the first three bays have broken pediment, the central one with a swag. All the windows in the top floor have plain pediments. In the second bay is a dormer with a scrolled pediment, pilasters and wings.	II
35 Tangier Street; 54.55068°N 3.58765°W	—	c. 1903	Originally a motor car salesroom and workshop, and later used for other purposes, it is rendered, and has a slate roof with red tile cresting. There are two storeys and four bays, the fourth bay curved, and a rear wing. In the ground floor is a shop window with a dentilled fascia, and decorated pedimented pilasters. In the upper floor the windows have pediments on console brackets, with plaster festoons between, and above is a moulded gutter with egg and dart decoration.	II
Engine houses, power station and pithead gear, Haig Colliery; 54.54306°N 3.59795°W		1914–18	A coal mine that closed in 1986, and which has been converted into a museum. The remaining parts consist of two engine houses, a power house, all in brick, and pithead gear in steel. The machinery in the engine houses is still intact.	II
Cenotaph; 54.54632°N 3.58413°W	—	1923	The cenotaph stands at the entrance to Castle Park. It is in Darley Dale sandstone, and consists of a square column with a low pyramidal top on a plain base, surmounted by a wreath. On the front is a relief carving of a personification of Peace, and inscriptions relating to the First World War. There is an added stone of a different colour carved with the dates of the Second World War.	II
9A Coates Lane; 54.54677°N 3.58967°W	—	Undated	Originally the Old Whitehaven Bank, the building is in stone with quoins and two cornice string courses, and it has two storeys. On the front facing Queen Street are four bays, and on the front facing Coates Lane are five bays, and a Tuscan doorway with a cornice and a pediment. The windows have moulded architraves. Also on Queen Street is a projecting bay with a moulded architrave and a pediment on console brackets.	II
54 and 55 Duke Street; 54.54789°N 3.58391°W	—	Undated	The building has two storeys with a pedimented gable, three bays, and end pilaster strips. The central doorway has pilasters, an architrave and a cornice.	II
8 and 9 Foxhouses Road; 54.54049°N 3.57726°W	—	Undated	A pair of semi-detached houses, mainly stuccoed, with four storeys. On the front are two-storey bay windows with shaped parapets, and in the top floor are Venetian windows with pediments. On the sides, steps lead up to Doric porches. The windows are sashes.	II
10 Foxhouses Road; 54.54029°N 3.57719°W	—	Undated	A stuccoed house in Gothic style with the front facing the road having three bays. The central bay has two storeys, with a doorway in the ground floor, a blocked Venetian window in the upper floor, and a pediment. The outer bays form half-gable wings and each contains a window in a pointed surround.	II
26B and 27 Lowther Street; 54.54812°N 3.58881°W	—	Undated	A pair of shops with three storeys; No. 26B has three bays and No. 27 has five. In the ground floor are five Ionic columns. No 27 has a central entrance flanked by shop windows. In the ground floor of No26B are two arches, one above a shop window, and the other above a yard entrance. Between the floors are cornice bands. In the middle floor are double windows in round arches, and the top floor contains rectangular sash windows.	II
75–77 Lowther Street; 54.54690°N 3.58556°W	—	Undated	A house and a pair of shops, stuccoed, and in three storeys. The house has four bays, a doorway with a fanlight, and a console on brackets. The shop has five bays, and in the ground floor is a central window with a consoles on brackets flanked by shop windows. Outside these are doorways with pediments and traceries fanlights, and to the left is a small entry door. All the other windows are sashes.	II
88 Main Street; 54.53670°N 3.56744°W	—	Undated	A stuccoed house, free-standing, with three storeys and its gable-end facing the street. The windows are sashes, one on the ground floor, two in the middle floor, and one in the top floor, all with hood moulds. The doorway and the window in the top floor have Tudor arched heads.	II
96–99 Main Street; 54.53639°N 3.56785°W	—	Undated	A row of four stuccoed houses with two storeys. Nos. 96–98 have slate roofs, and one window in each floor. No 99 is larger with a stone roof, three bays, and a central doorway with a blocked window above. All the windows are sashes.	II
140 Queen Street; 54.54723°N 3.58798°W	—	Undated	A warehouse in red sandstone with quoins and a cornice. There are four storeys and three bays. The central bay contains a doorway in each floor, and there is a hoist at the top. The outer bays contain windows, some of which are sashes.	II
11 and 12 West Strand; 54.54800°N 3.59204°W	—	Undated	Originally Dobson and Musgrave warehouse, combining an office and a warehouse, it is stuccoed with four storeys. On each floor are four windows and a warehouse door. (Note: Street View in June 2015 shows that the warehouse has been converted into residential accommodation.)	II
7 West View; 54.53690°N 3.56579°W	—	Undated	A stone house in cottage orné style, it has two storeys and three bays. The central bay consists of a two-storey five-sided bay window. The house has a Dutch gable and there are obelisk pinnacles on the gable and the corners. In the gable and in the upper storey are windows with pointed heads; in the ground floor are sash windows.	II
Central Hotel; 54.54933°N 3.58785°W	—	Undated	The building stands on a corner site and incorporates Nos. 23 and 24 New Street. It is rendered with rusticated stone quoins. The main part has three storeys and five bays, and there are five bays on New Street. Steps with an iron balustrade lead up to a doorway with a moulded surround, a cornice and a pediment. The windows are sashes.	II
Columba Club; 54.54716°N 3.58808°W	—	Undated	A stuccoed building with three storeys and three bays. The doorway has Tuscan half-columns, a frieze, a cornice, and a pediment, and the windows are sashes.	II
Garden wall, Oak Bank Terrace; 54.55522°N 3.57962°W	—	Undated	The garden wall runs between the houses in the terrace and their gardens. On the gate piers are fluted urns.	II
Royal Standard Hotel; 54.54805°N 3.59236°W		Undated	The hotel is in stone with a rusticated ground floor, quoins, a cornice, and a hipped roof. There are three storeys and a front of three bays. In the ground floor are round-arched windows, and above are sash windows, those in the middle floor having cornices. (Note: Street View in June 2015 shows that the building is named The Waterfront.)	II
Wulstan Hall; 54.54731°N 3.58787°W	—	Undated	A stuccoed house with side pilasters and deep modillioned eaves on scroll consoles. There are three storeys and five bays, and two doorways with Tuscan pilasters and a cornice. The windows are sashes in moulded surrounds.	II

== Notes and references ==
=== Sources ===
- Historic England, "Old Fort, Whitehaven (1335968)", National Heritage List for England
- Historic England, "Whitehaven Old Fort (1020460)", National Heritage List for England
- Historic England, "No. 54 Roper Street with properties to the rear (formerly Rudd's Court), Whitehaven (1263925)", National Heritage List for England
- Historic England, "Whitehaven Hospital or Infirmary (1335996)", National Heritage List for England
- Historic England, "Old Custom House, Whitehaven (1086718)", National Heritage List for England
- Historic England, "Waverley Hotel, Whitehaven (1086716)", National Heritage List for England
- Historic England, "Old Quay, Whitehaven (1086804)", National Heritage List for England
- Historic England, "Jonathan Swift House, Whitehaven (1247785)", National Heritage List for England
- Historic England, "Town Hall, Whitehaven (1086779)", National Heritage List for England
- Historic England, "Old Quay Lighthouse, Whitehaven (1086805)", National Heritage List for England
- Historic England, "Premises occupied by YMCA, Whitehaven (1335984)", National Heritage List for England
- Historic England, "No. 51 Roper Street, Whitehaven (1086742)", National Heritage List for England
- Historic England, "No. 25 Lowther Street, Whitehaven (1207843)", National Heritage List for England
- Historic England, "No. 1 Marlborough Street with Warehouse attached to rear, Whitehaven (1247813)", National Heritage List for England
- Historic England, "Royal Hotel, Whitehaven (1086738)", National Heritage List for England
- Historic England, "No. 52 Roper Street, Whitehaven (1376821)", National Heritage List for England
- Historic England, "Golden Lion Hotel, Whitehaven (1086725)", National Heritage List for England
- Historic England, "Wall behind West Cumberland College of Science and Technology, Whitehaven (1263962)", National Heritage List for England
- Historic England, "Nos. 1 to 16 Church Street, Whitehaven (1086809)", National Heritage List for England
- Historic England, "Strand House, Whitehaven (1279534)", National Heritage List for England
- Historic England, "No. 151 Queen Street (including area railings), Whitehaven (1086737)", National Heritage List for England
- Historic England, "Nos. 1A, 1, 2, 3, 4, and 4A Cross Street, Whitehaven (1335992)", National Heritage List for England
- Historic England, "Nos. 5 to 9 and 11 Cross Street, Whitehaven (1086770)", National Heritage List for England
- Historic England, "No. 12 Cross Street, Whitehaven (1335993)", National Heritage List for England
- Historic England, "Nos. 14 and 15 Howgill Street, Whitehaven (1086751)", National Heritage List for England
- Historic England, "Nos. 46 to 50 Duke Street, Whitehaven (1086775)", National Heritage List for England
- Historic England, "Nos. 36 to 38 Roper Street, Whitehaven (1208088)", National Heritage List for England
- Historic England, "Old New Quay, Whitehaven (1374256)", National Heritage List for England
- Historic England, "No. 30 Roper Street, Whitehaven (1086741)", National Heritage List for England
- Historic England, "Somerset House, Whitehaven (1086776)", National Heritage List for England
- Historic England, "No. 10 College Street, Whitehaven (1086769)", National Heritage List for England
- Historic England, "No. 53 Duke Street, Whitehaven (1086777)", National Heritage List for England
- Historic England, "Nos. 11 to 16 Foxhouses Road, Whitehaven (1086784)", National Heritage List for England
- Historic England, "Nos. 19, 20 and 20A Foxhouses Road, Whitehaven (1207576)", National Heritage List for England
- Historic England, "No. 12 Front Corkickle, Whitehaven (1086788)", National Heritage List for England
- Historic England, "Nos. 1 to 11 High Street (all with iron railings to front steps), Whitehaven (1086748)", National Heritage List for England
- Historic England, "No. 10 Howgill Street (with iron railings to front door), Whitehaven (1335982)", National Heritage List for England
- Historic England, "No. 11 Howgill Street, Whitehaven (1086749)", National Heritage List for England
- Historic England, "No. 12 Howgill Street, Whitehaven (1086750)", National Heritage List for England
- Historic England, "No. 7 Irish Street, Whitehaven (1335983)", National Heritage List for England
- Historic England, "No. 17 Irish Street, Whitehaven (1086757)", National Heritage List for England
- Historic England, "No. 18 Irish Street, Whitehaven (1279555)", National Heritage List for England
- Historic England, "Nos. 41 to 43 Irish Street, Whitehaven (1279559)", National Heritage List for England
- Historic England, "No. 26 Lowther Street, Whitehaven (1086761)", National Heritage List for England
- Historic England, "No. 37 Lowther Street, Whitehaven (1086762)", National Heritage List for England
- Historic England, "No. 38 Lowther Street, Whitehaven (1207853)", National Heritage List for England
- Historic England, "Nos. 39 to 42 Lowther Street, Whitehaven (1335987)", National Heritage List for England
- Historic England, "Nos. 44 to 47 Lowther Street, Whitehaven (1086763)", National Heritage List for England
- Historic England, "Nos. 78 and 79 Lowther Street, Whitehaven (1086765)", National Heritage List for England
- Historic England, "No. 80 Lowther Street, Whitehaven (1279543)", National Heritage List for England
- Historic England, "No. 43 Queen Street, Whitehaven (1086733)", National Heritage List for England
- Historic England, "Church of St James the Greater, Whitehaven (1086747)", National Heritage List for England
- Historic England, "Gate Piers and lamp holders at Church of St James, Whitehaven (1335981)", National Heritage List for England
- Historic England, "North-East Gate and Railings, St Nicholas Gardens, Whitehaven (1480249)", National Heritage List for England
- Historic England, "No. 1 Lowther Street, Whitehaven (1086759)", National Heritage List for England
- Historic England, "No. 35 Queen Street, Whitehaven (1086732)", National Heritage List for England
- Historic England, "No. 14 Scotch Street, Whitehaven (1335979)", National Heritage List for England
- Historic England, "Nos. 71 and 72 George Street, Whitehaven (1207711)", National Heritage List for England
- Historic England, "Nos. 44 and 45 Roper Street, Whitehaven (1336017)", National Heritage List for England
- Historic England, "No. 150 Queen Street, Whitehaven (1336013)", National Heritage List for England
- Historic England, "Nos. 152 to 155 Queen Street, Whitehaven (1208032)", National Heritage List for England
- Historic England, "The Watch House, Whitehaven (1390499)", National Heritage List for England
- Historic England, "Whitehaven Hospital or Infirmary, Whitehaven (1335996)", National Heritage List for England
- Historic England, "Nos. 4 to 8 Garden Villas, Whitehaven (1335961)", National Heritage List for England
- Historic England, "No. 29 Roper Street, Whitehaven (1336016)", National Heritage List for England
- Historic England, "No. 112 Scotch Street, Whitehaven (1247786)", National Heritage List for England
- Historic England, "No. 113 Scotch Street, Whitehaven (1247787)", National Heritage List for England
- Historic England, "Meadow House, Whitehaven (1279650)", National Heritage List for England
- Historic England, "Nos. 15 and 16 Catherine Street, Whitehaven (1086807)", National Heritage List for England
- Historic England, "Nos. 16 and 17 Queen Street, Whitehaven (1086729)", National Heritage List for England
- Historic England, "Nos. 127 to 131 Queen Street, Whitehaven (1207945)", National Heritage List for England
- Historic England, "No. 132 Queen Street, Whitehaven (1336012)", National Heritage List for England
- Historic England, "Nos. 19 and 20 Roper Street, Whitehaven (1336015)", National Heritage List for England
- Historic England, "Nos. 21 and 22 Roper Street, Whitehaven (1293339)", National Heritage List for England
- Historic England, "Nos. 23 and 24 Roper Street, Whitehaven (1086739)", National Heritage List for England
- Historic England, "No. 25 Roper Street, Whitehaven (1086740)", National Heritage List for England
- Historic England, "No. 28 Roper Street, Whitehaven (1208082)", National Heritage List for England
- Historic England, "Nos. 1 to 3 Scotch Street, Whitehaven (1335978)", National Heritage List for England
- Historic England, "Nos. 4 to 8 Scotch Street, Whitehaven (1086744)", National Heritage List for England
- Historic England, "Nos. 9 and 10 Scotch Street, Whitehaven (1208119)", National Heritage List for England
- Historic England, "Bonded Warehouse, Whitehaven (1335969)", National Heritage List for England
- Historic England, "Chapel House, Whitehaven (1086781)", National Heritage List for England
- Historic England, "College Chambers, Whitehaven (1335991)", National Heritage List for England
- Historic England, "Greenbank Hotel, Whitehaven (1293316)", National Heritage List for England
- Historic England, "The Kirk Mission Hall, Gatepiers and attached Boundary Wall, Whitehaven (1263964)", National Heritage List for England
- Historic England, "Masonic Hall, Whitehaven (1086812)", National Heritage List for England
- Historic England, "Nos. 30 to 34, 34A and 35 Church Street, Whitehaven (1038324)", National Heritage List for England
- Historic England, "No. 49 Church Street, Whitehaven (1086810)", National Heritage List for England
- Historic England, "No. 50 Church Street, Whitehaven (1038305)", National Heritage List for England
- Historic England, "Nos. 51 to 53 Church Street, Whitehaven (1335971)", National Heritage List for England
- Historic England, "Nos. 54 to 57 and 57A Church Street, Whitehaven (1086811)", National Heritage List for England
- Historic England, "North Wall and Old North Wall (enclosing North Harbour), Whitehaven (1038936)", National Heritage List for England
- Historic England, "Nos. 4 and 5 Foxhouses Road, Whitehaven (1207526)", National Heritage List for England
- Historic England, "Nos. 6 and 7 Foxhouses Road, Whitehaven (1086783)", National Heritage List for England
- Historic England, "The Distressed Sailor, Whitehaven (1207481)", National Heritage List for England
- Historic England, "Nos. 22 and 23 Foxhouses Road, Whitehaven (1086785)", National Heritage List for England
- Historic England, "Nos. 1 to 4 Front Corkickle, Whitehaven (1335959)", National Heritage List for England
- Historic England, "Nos. 5 and 6 Front Corkickle, Whitehaven (1086786)", National Heritage List for England
- Historic England, "Nos. 9 to 11 Front Corkickle, Whitehaven (1335960)", National Heritage List for England
- Historic England, "Nos. 1 to 6 Hamilton Terrace, Whitehaven (1335980)", National Heritage List for England
- Historic England, "Nos. 7 to 19 Lonsdale Place, Whitehaven (1207826)", National Heritage List for England
- Historic England, "Nos. 1 to 3 Retreat, Whitehaven (1336014)", National Heritage List for England
- Historic England, "Wellington House, Whitehaven (1086717)", National Heritage List for England
- Historic England, "Nos. 1 and 2 Foxhouses Road, Whitehaven (1279704)", National Heritage List for England
- Historic England, "Barracks Mill, Whitehaven (1038943)", National Heritage List for England
- Historic England, "West Pier, Whitehaven (1335967)", National Heritage List for England
- Historic England, "Nos. 96 and 97 Duke Street, Whitehaven (1335994)", National Heritage List for England
- Historic England, "No. 70 George Street, Whitehaven (1086789)", National Heritage List for England
- Historic England, "Clydesdale Bank, Whitehaven (1086764)", National Heritage List for England
- Historic England, "Nos. 81 to 83 Lowther Street, Whitehaven (1335989)", National Heritage List for England
- Historic England, "Nos. 89, 90, 92, 93, 94, and 95 Main Street, Whitehaven (1279513)", National Heritage List for England
- Historic England, "No. 56 Roper Street with outbuildings and warehouse to rear, Whitehaven (1247788)", National Heritage List for England
- Historic England, "Nos. 4 and 5 Duke Street, Whitehaven (1086771)", National Heritage List for England
- Historic England, "Nos. 15 to 19 Front Corkickle, Whitehaven (1279618)", National Heritage List for England
- Historic England, "Nos. 83 to 87 George Street, Whitehaven (1207716)", National Heritage List for England
- Historic England, "No. 1 Hamilton Lane, Whitehaven (1335962)", National Heritage List for England
- Historic England, "Nos. 46 to 49 and 49A Roper Street, Whitehaven (1208097)", National Heritage List for England
- Historic England, "Nos. 84 to 95 Scotch Street, Whitehaven (1086746)", National Heritage List for England
- Historic England, "Nos. 43 and 44 Duke Street, Whitehaven (1086774)", National Heritage List for England
- Historic England, "Nos. 1 to 3 Victoria Terrace, Whitehaven (1336004)", National Heritage List for England
- Historic England, "No. 8 Front Corkickle, Whitehaven (1086787)", National Heritage List for England
- Historic England, "Area railings, wall and railings to front, and small iron gate at No. 8 Front Corkickle, Whitehaven (1207695)", National Heritage List for England
- Historic England, "Nos. 38 to 48 Main Street, Whitehaven (1207873)", National Heritage List for England
- Historic England, "Nos. 81 to 87 Main Street, Whitehaven (1335990)", National Heritage List for England
- Historic England, "West Pier Lighthouse, Whitehaven (1086806)", National Heritage List for England
- Historic England, "Savings Bank, Whitehaven (1335988)", National Heritage List for England
- Historic England, "Nos. 105 and 105A Duke Street and 1 and 2 King Street, Whitehaven (1279718)", National Heritage List for England
- Historic England, "No. 55 Roper Street, Whitehaven (1247789)", National Heritage List for England
- Historic England, "No. 5 Foxhouses Road, Whitehaven (1086782)", National Heritage List for England
- Historic England, "Nos. 1 to 10 Oak Bank, Whitehaven (1336011)", National Heritage List for England
- Historic England, "Nos. 19 and 20 Irish Street with coach house entrance and area railings, Whitehaven (1086758)", National Heritage List for England
- Historic England, "Nos. 17 and 18 Foxhouses Road, Whitehaven (1335958)", National Heritage List for England
- Historic England, "Nos. 57 and 58 Roper Street, Whitehaven (1086743)", National Heritage List for England
- Historic England, "Marine Terrace, Whitehaven (1086728)", National Heritage List for England
- Historic England, "Union Hall, Whitehaven (1336003)", National Heritage List for England
- Historic England, "Nos. 17 and 18 Howgill Street, Whitehaven (1086752)", National Heritage List for England
- Historic England, "Nos. 1 and 2 Inkerman Terrace, Whitehaven (1086753)", National Heritage List for England
- Historic England, "Nos. 13 and 14 Inkerman Terrace, Whitehaven (1086754)", National Heritage List for England
- Historic England, "Nos. 15 and 16 Inkerman Terrace, Whitehaven (1086755)", National Heritage List for England
- Historic England, "Nos. 17 and 18 Inkerman Terrace, Whitehaven (1086756)", National Heritage List for England
- Historic England, "Nos. 4 and 5 Irish Street, Whitehaven (1207813)", National Heritage List for England
- Historic England, "Nos. 7 to 17 Lowther Street, Whitehaven (1335985)", National Heritage List for England
- Historic England, "Nos. 22 to 24 Lowther Street, Whitehaven (1086760)", National Heritage List for England
- Historic England, "Nos. 35 to 37 Main Street and coach-house adjoining No. 37, Whitehaven (1086766)", National Heritage List for England
- Historic England, "Globe Hotel, Whitehaven (1335995)", National Heritage List for England
- Historic England, "Pack Horse Public House, Whitehaven (1279531)", National Heritage List for England
- Historic England, "Westminster Bank, Whitehaven (1086735)", National Heritage List for England
- Historic England, "Nos. 31A and 31B Scotch Street, Whitehaven (1208127)", National Heritage List for England
- Historic England, "Nos. 32 to 35 Scotch Street, Whitehaven (1086745)", National Heritage List for England
- Historic England, "Air shaft cap to former railway tunnel, Whitehaven (1263937)", National Heritage List for England
- Historic England, "Air shaft cap to former railway tunnel, Whitehaven (1263939)", National Heritage List for England
- Historic England, "Air shaft cap to former railway tunnel, Whitehaven (1247816)", National Heritage List for England
- Historic England, "Air shaft cap to former railway tunnel, Whitehaven (1247863)", National Heritage List for England
- Historic England, "Air shaft cap to former railway tunnel, Whitehaven (1247815)", National Heritage List for England
- Historic England, "Co-operative Store, Whitehaven (1086772)", National Heritage List for England
- Historic England, "Formerly known as The Shakespeare Public House, Whitehaven (1247790)", National Heritage List for England
- Historic England, "Church of St Begh, Whitehaven (1392021)", National Heritage List for England
- Historic England, "No. 7 Front Corkicle, Whitehaven (1366075)", National Heritage List for England
- Historic England, "Methodist Church and Sunday School, Whitehaven (1263963)", National Heritage List for England
- Historic England, "Market Hall, Whitehaven (1086724)", National Heritage List for England
- Historic England, "The St Nicholas Centre, Whitehaven (1038534)", National Heritage List for England
- Historic England, "Whittle's Furniture Store, Whitehaven (1086773)", National Heritage List for England
- Historic England, "No. 23 Tangier Street, Whitehaven (1247814)", National Heritage List for England
- Historic England, "Engine houses, power station and pithead gear at Haig Colliery, Whitehaven (1263938)", National Heritage List for England
- Historic England, "Whitehaven cenotaph (1454340)", National Heritage List for England
- Historic England, "No. 9A Coates Lane, Whitehaven (1038310)", National Heritage List for England
- Historic England, "Nos. 54 and 55 Duke Street, Whitehaven (1086778)", National Heritage List for England
- Historic England, "Nos. 8 and 9 Foxhouses Road, Whitehaven (1335997)", National Heritage List for England
- Historic England, "No. 10 Foxhouses Road, Whitehaven (1207556)", National Heritage List for England
- Historic England, "Barclays Bank, Nos. 26B and 27 Lowther Street, Whitehaven (1335986)", National Heritage List for England
- Historic England, "Nos. 75 to 77 Lowther Street, Whitehaven (1207864)", National Heritage List for England
- Historic England, "No. 88 Main Street, Whitehaven (1086767)", National Heritage List for England
- Historic England, "Nos. 96 to 99 Main Street, Whitehaven (1086768)", National Heritage List for England
- Historic England, "No. 140 Queen Street, Whitehaven (1086736)", National Heritage List for England
- Historic England, "Dobson and Musgrave warehouse, Whitehaven (1336005)", National Heritage List for England
- Historic England, "No. 7 West View, Whitehaven (1336006)", National Heritage List for England
- Historic England, "Central Hotel, Whitehaven (1086780)", National Heritage List for England
- Historic England, "Columba Club, Whitehaven (1207995)", National Heritage List for England
- Historic England, "Garden wall and urns in front (West) of Nos. 1 to 10 (consecutive) Oak Bank Terrace, Whitehaven (1086727)", National Heritage List for England
- Historic England, "Royal Standard Hotel, Whitehaven (1086719)", National Heritage List for England
- Historic England, "Wulstan Hall, Whitehaven (1207971)", National Heritage List for England
- Historic England, Listed Buildings
- Hyde, Matthew; Pevsner, Nikolaus (2010) [1967], Cumbria, The Buildings of England, New Haven and London: Yale University Press, ISBN 978-0-300-12663-1
