= Robert Beatham =

Recipient of the Victoria Cross (1894–1918)

Robert Matthew Beatham VC
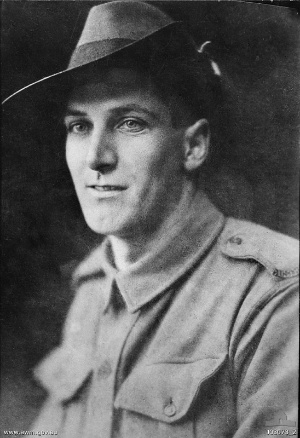
- Private Robert Beatham c.1915–18
- Born: 16 June 1894; Glassonby, Cumberland, England
- Died: 11 August 1918 (aged 24); Rosières, France
- Military career
- Allegiance: Australia
- Branch: Australian Army
- Service years: 1915–18
- Rank: Private
- Units: 8th Battalion
- Conflicts: First World War; Gallipoli campaign; Western Front; Battle of the Somme; Battle of Pozieres (WIA); Battle of Passchendaele; Battle of Broodseinde (WIA); Hundred Days Offensive; Battle of Amiens †
- Awards: Victoria Cross

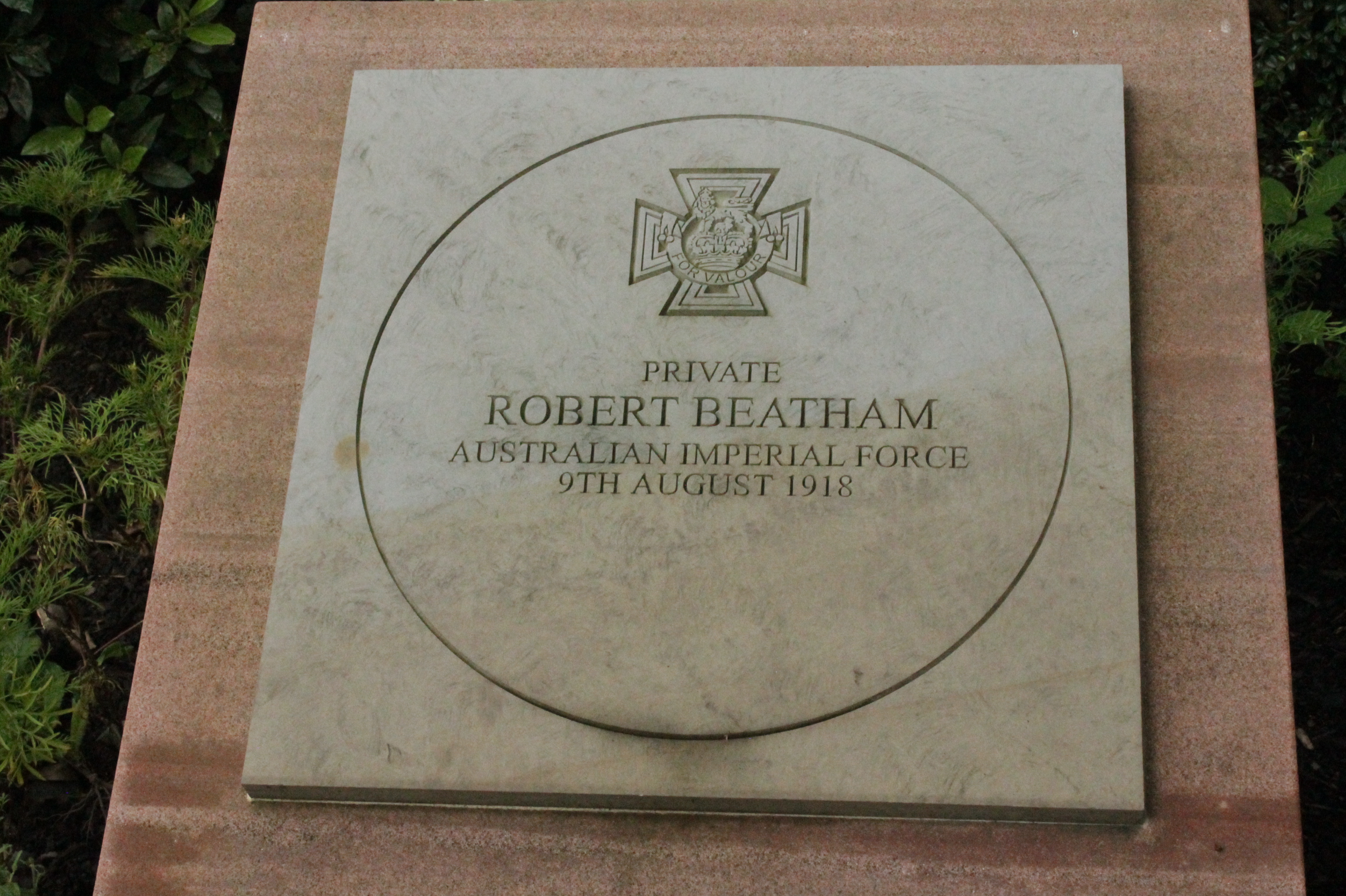
Memorial to Robert Beatham VC in Penrith

Robert Matthew Beatham, VC (16 June 1894 – 11 August 1918) was a British-born Australian recipient of the Victoria Cross, the highest award for gallantry "in the face of the enemy" that can be awarded to British and Commonwealth forces. He saw action in the Australian Imperial Force during the First World War and fell at the Battle of Amiens.

== Early life ==
Beatham was born on 16 June 1894 to John and Elizabeth Beatham, who resided at Glassonby, Cumberland, England. He was educated at a local school and as a teenager, he emigrated to Australia with his brother Walter. He was labouring at Geelong in Victoria when he volunteered for the Australian Imperial Force on 8 January 1915.

== First World War ==
Beatham was posted to the 8th Battalion with the rank of private. He embarked on HMAT Hororata from Melbourne on 17 April 1915 for Suez but returned to Australia in August 1915 due to venereal disease. After recuperating he embarked for Gallipoli as a reinforcement for 8th Battalion. He saw nearly a month of active service at Gallipoli before the general evacuation to Alexandria.

From there Beatham was sent to France, arriving with his battalion in Marseilles on 31 March 1916 en route for the Western Front. Later that year he participated in the Battle of Pozières during which he was wounded. After six weeks of recuperation he rejoined his unit in late September 1917. He was wounded a second time on 4 October 1917 at Broodseinde during the Battle of Passchendaele and was evacuated to England for treatment and recovery. During his sojourn in England he was found guilty of being absent without leave over the New Year of 1918 and was given field punishment and a forfeit of pay. He rejoined his unit in February 1918.

Beatham was a member of 'A' Coy of 8th Battalion. On 9 August 1918 at Rosières, east of Amiens, on the second day of the Battle of Amiens, Beatham's battalion was attacking high ground when it was held up by heavy machine gun fire after supporting armour was knocked out of action. Beatham, accompanied by Lance Corporal W. G. Nottingham, made four charges to knock out a series of German machine gun posts holding back the advance of the Australians. Wounded in the leg during the first charge, he was killed taking out a final machine gun post on 11 August. For his gallantry he was posthumously awarded the Victoria Cross (VC). Gazetted on 14 December 1918, the citation for his VC read as follows:

For most conspicuous bravery and self-sacrifice during the attack north of Rosieres, east of Amiens, on 9th Aug., 1918. When the advance was held up by heavy machine gun fire, Pte. Beatham dashed forward, and, assisted by one man, bombed and fought the crews of four enemy machine guns, killing ten of them and capturing ten others, thus facilitating the advance and saving many casualties. When the final objective was reached, although previously wounded, he again dashed forward and bombed a machine gun, being riddled with bullets and killed in doing so. The valour displayed by this gallant soldier inspired all ranks in a wonderful manner.

— The London Gazette, 14 December 1918

Beatham is buried at Heath Cemetery, in Harbonnières.

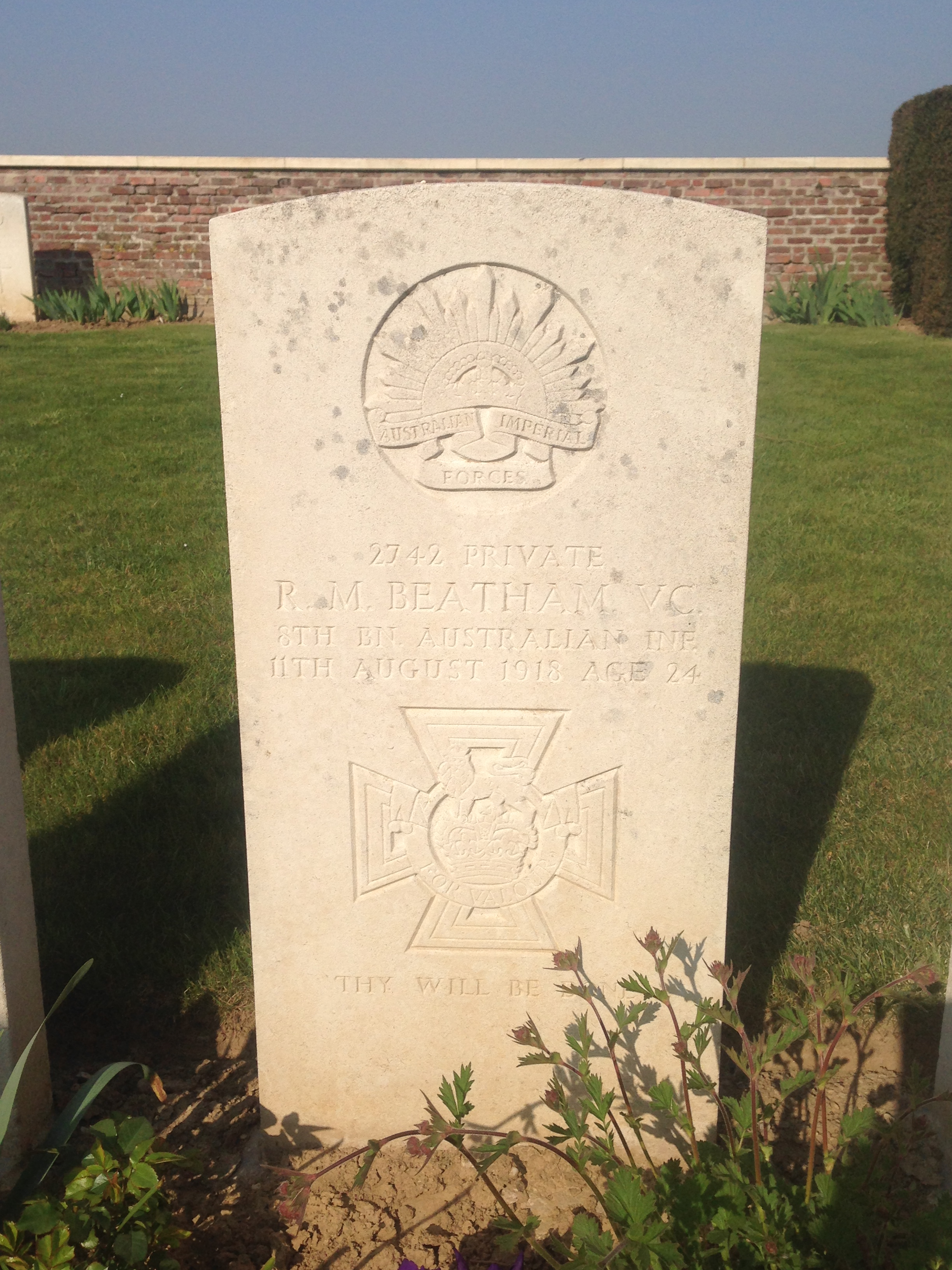
Beatham's grave at Heath Cemetery, Harbonnières

Six of his brothers saw active service in the First World War; three died and another spent two years as a prisoner of war. Robert's younger brother Walter also enlisted in the AIF and served with 21st Battalion and survived the war.

== Honours and awards ==

Ribbon	Description	Notes
Ribbon of the Victoria Cross	Victoria Cross (VC)	Awarded posthumously for his actions on the Battle of Amiens, gazetted 1918
Ribbon for the 1914–15 Star	1914–15 Star	Awarded for service overseas (or en route) during 1914 or 1915
Ribbon of the British War Medal 1914–18	British War Medal 1914–18	Awarded for Operational Service between 5 August 1914 and 11 November 1918
Ribbon of the Victory Medal 1914–19	Victory Medal 1914–19	Awarded to commemorate the Allied Victory in the First World War
