= Glassonby =

Village and civil parish in Cumbria, England

Coordinates: 54.733°N 2.650°W

- Village and parish
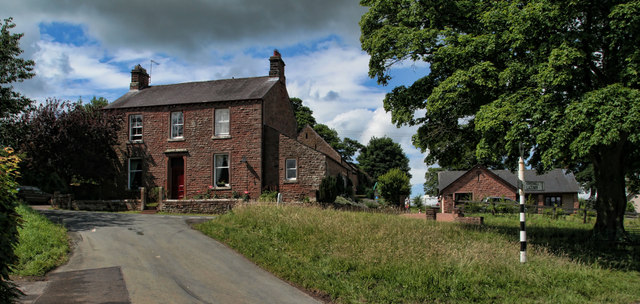
- Glassonby

- Location in the former Eden District Location within Cumbria
- Population: 339 Parish, 2021
- OS grid reference: NY5738
- Civil parish: Glassonby
- Unitary authority: Westmorland and Furness
- Ceremonial county: Cumbria
- Region: North West
- Country: England
- Sovereign state: United Kingdom
- Post town: PENRITH
- Postcode district: CA10
- Dialling code: 01768
- Police: Cumbria
- Fire: Cumbria
- Ambulance: North West
- UK Parliament: Penrith and Solway

Glassonby is a small village and civil parish in the Eden Valley, in the Westmorland and Furness district of Cumbria, England. It lies about 3 miles (4.8 km) south south east of Kirkoswald. At the 2021 census the parish had a population of 339.

Glassonby was historically part of the parish of Addingham. The former village of Addingham stood on the eastern bank of the River Eden, but was abandoned after the river changed its course.

Just to the north of the village, at White House Farm, is a well-preserved late 16th-century bastle house. There is a microlight flying centre in the village.

== Toponymy ==
'Glassonby' means 'Glassan's bȳ' 'Bȳ' is late Old English, from Old Norse 'býr', meaning 'hamlet' or 'village'. 'Glassan' is an Irish personal name. Glassonby is also called 'Grayson Lands', meaning 'grey horses', which may refer to the stone circle ('Grey stone lands') mentioned below.

== History ==
Glassonby was historically part of the ancient parish of Addingham in the county of Cumberland. The parish was divided into four townships: Gamblesby, Glassonby, Hunsonby and Winskill and Little Salkeld. The original village of Addingham and its parish church stood on the eastern bank of the River Eden, in the north-western corner of the Glassonby township. Addingham village appears to have been abandoned sometime between the 14th and 16th centuries, and the old parish church and its graveyard were gradually washed away by the changing course of the river. A new church, dedicated to St Michael, was built just south of Glassonby village in the early 16th century to replace the former church.

Each of the four townships in Addingham parish, including Glassonby, were made civil parishes in 1866. The parish of Glassonby subsequently absorbed Gamblesby in 1934. Although Addingham village has long since been abandoned, the ecclesiastical parish retains the name of Addingham.

=== Glassonby stone circle ===
The Glassonby stone circle (actually a kerbed cairn) is at OS reference NY57293934 on private land. An oval cairn is surrounded by a ring of kerb stones (30 stones in all, although some have been taken away and others added from field clearance over the years). Two of the stones had markings in the form of concentric rings or spirals and semi-ovoids. The stones were not set in sockets, but were supported by the cairn material. A cist was found inside the circle, which had been robbed, as well a transparent blue glass, probably a later votive offering. Outside the circle, burnt bones and an inverted collared urn were found. The bones were the remains of a man; a second cremation, without an urn, was possibly that of a woman. There are ditch marks that suggest there was a ring ditch, the terminus of a cursus. This, and the markings suggest a link to the Long Meg complex to the south-west, and to the Old Parks circle to the north-east.

=== Old Parks cairn ===
This cairn, no longer extant, was at OS NY56993988, just north of the Glassonby circle. It was recorded as being 4 feet (1.2 m) high and oval in shape, with a line of five decorated stones below the cairn oriented north-south. To the west of the stones were 32 deposits of burnt bones, with accompanying Beaker ware cups, fragments of urns and 12 shale beads. Other pits were found to the east. A granite monolith, 4 feet 7 inches (1.40 m) high also stood to the west of the monument. Two of the decorated stones, along with incense cups and flint instruments found at the site, are on display at the Tullie House Museum and Art Gallery in Carlisle.

== Glassonby Civil Parish ==
The civil parish of Glassonby stretches from the banks of the River Eden to the summits of the North Pennines, where it borders Alston Moor. In addition to Glassonby itself it includes the village of Gamblesby, a separate civil parish until 1934, and the hamlets of Glassonbybeck, Maughanby and Unthank.

== Notable residents ==
Private Robert Beatham VC, an Australian soldier and posthumous Victoria Cross recipient, was born in Glassonby. He emigrated to Australia as a teenager, prior to the outbreak of the First World War and was killed in action on 9 August 1918, aged 24.

The ashes of Rev. George Bramwell Evens, who was a popular broadcaster of the 1930s, were scattered at Old Parks Farm. He was a regular visitor to Glassonby in the 1920s and 1930s. He is commemorated by a memorial at Old Parks which reads 'Sacred to the memory of Rev. G. Bramwell Evens, "Romany of the BBC", whose ashes are scattered here. Born 1884. Died November 1943. He loved birds and trees and flowers and the wind on the heath'.

== See also ==
- Listed buildings in Glassonby
