= Unthank, Glassonby =

Village in Cumbria, England

Coordinates: 54.756°N 2.615°W

Unthank
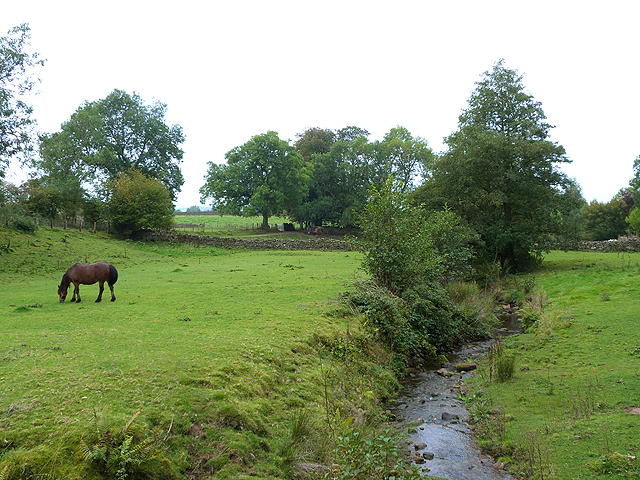
- Hazelrigg Beck at Unthank

- Location in Eden, Cumbria Location within Cumbria
- OS grid reference: NY604403
- Civil parish: Glassonby
- Unitary authority: Westmorland and Furness
- Ceremonial county: Cumbria
- Region: North West
- Country: England
- Sovereign state: United Kingdom
- Post town: PENRITH
- Postcode district: CA10
- Dialling code: 01768
- Police: Cumbria
- Fire: Cumbria
- Ambulance: North West
- UK Parliament: Penrith and Solway

Unthank is a village near Gamblesby in the civil parish of Glassonby in Cumbria, England. It is first mentioned in writing as Unthanke in 1332.

== See also ==
- Listed buildings in Glassonby
