= Whitehaven Town Hall =

Municipal building in Whitehaven, Cumbria, England

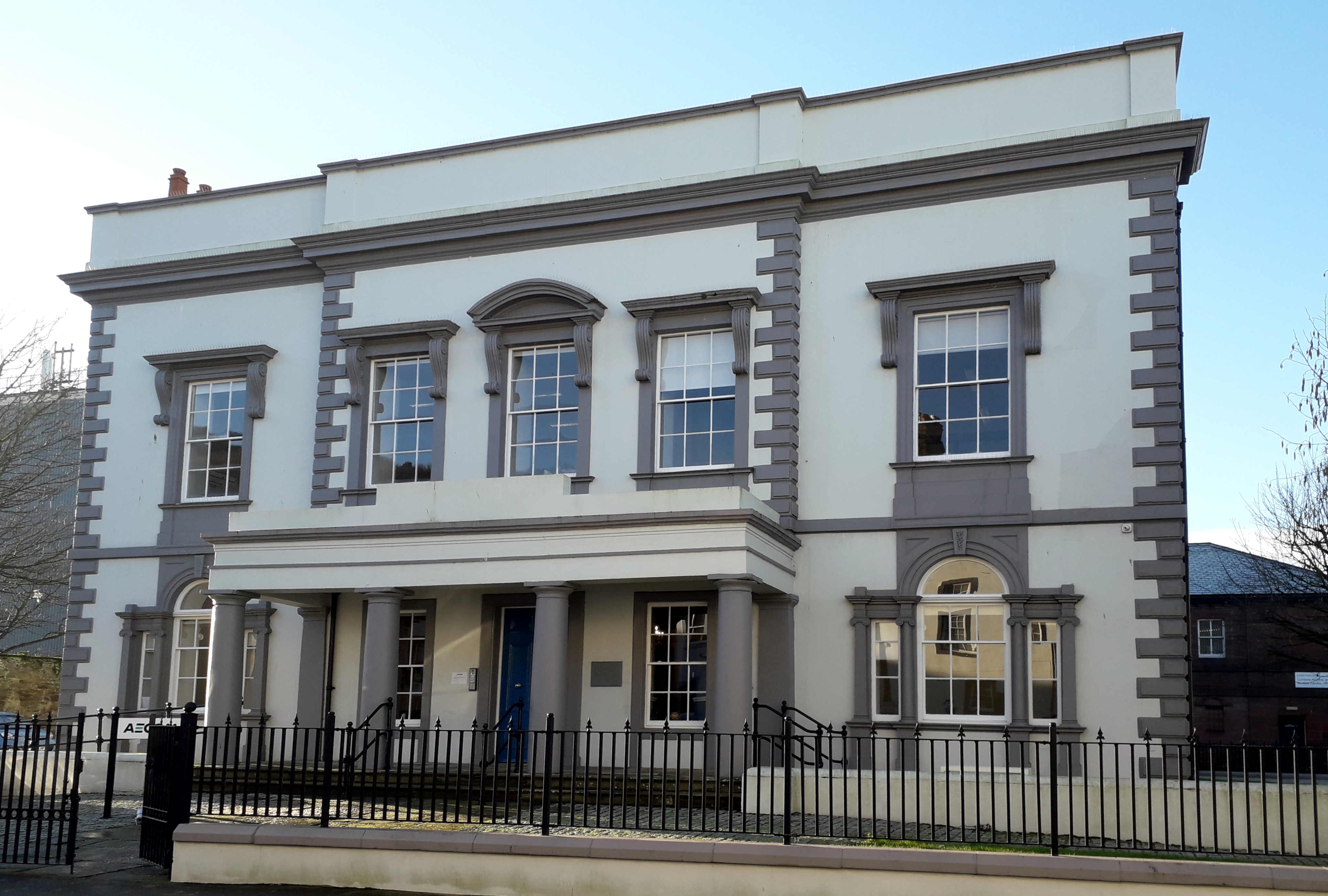
- Whitehaven Town Hall

- Shown in Cumbria
- 54.5480°N 3.5845°W
- Location: Duke Street, Whitehaven

History
- Built: 1710

Site notes
- Architect: William Barnes
- Architectural style: Neoclassical style

Listed Building – Grade II
- Official name: Town Hall
- Designated: 13 September 1972
- Reference no.: 1086779

Whitehaven Town Hall is a municipal building in Duke Street in Whitehaven, Cumbria, England. The building, which was the headquarters of Whitehaven Borough Council, is a Grade II listed building.

== History ==
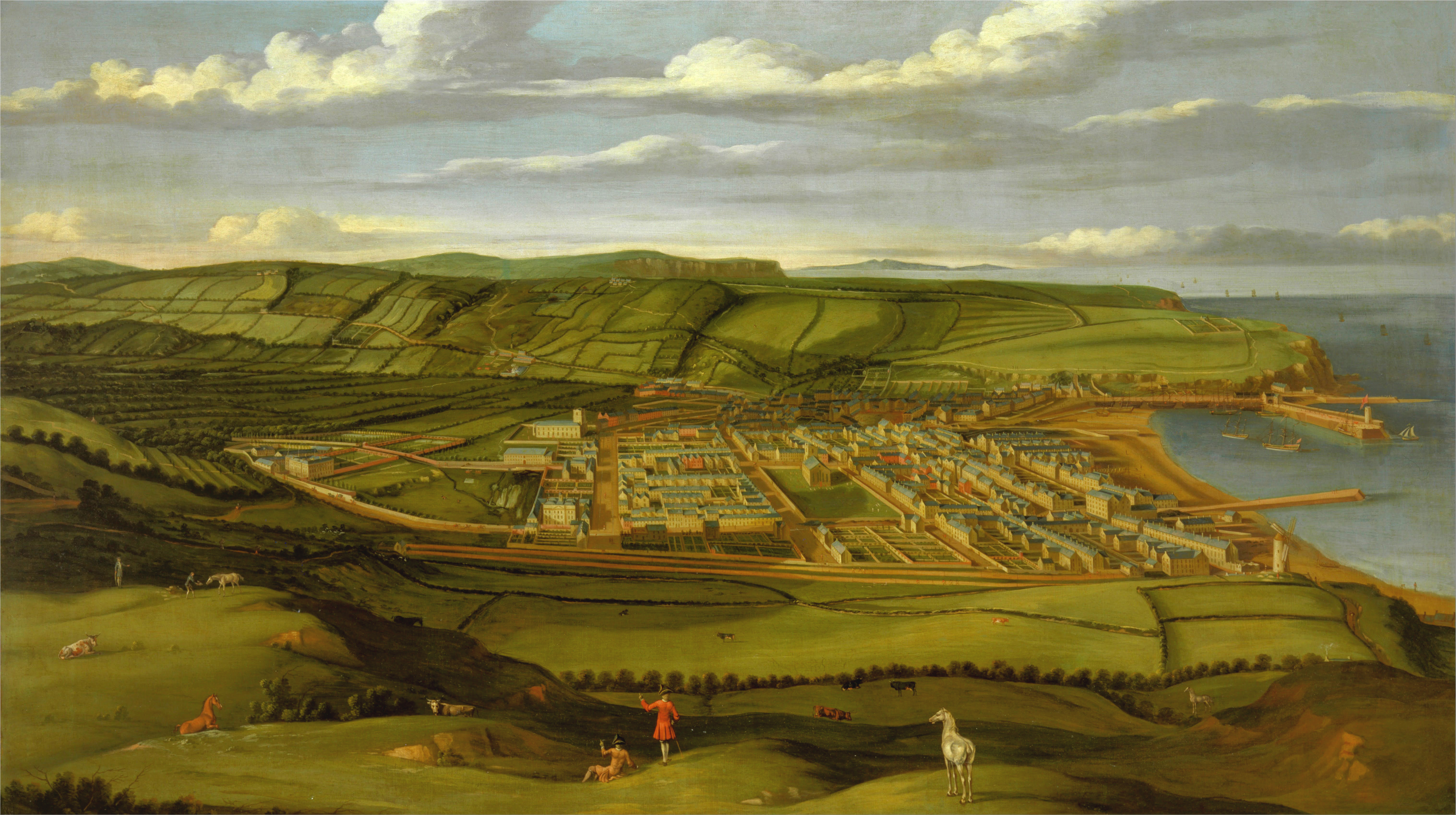
Matthias Read's view of Whitehaven, circa 1736, with "The Cupola" just visible (the three-storey building with a cupola to the left of centre in the foreground)

The building, which was originally designed as a family home for a local merchant, William Feryes, was built on land granted by Sir James Lowther at a cost of £2,400 and was completed in 1710. The design involved a symmetrical main frontage with nine bays on three floors facing onto Duke Street and featured a cupola on the roof. The house, which was known as "The Cupola", was surrounded by warehouses and was depicted in the foreground of the painting A Bird's-Eye View of Whitehaven by Matthias Read when he painted it in 1736.

After Feryes died, the house passed to his wife, Mehetabel Feryes (née Gale), and was then passed down the Gale family until it was acquired by John Lewthwaite in 1796. After Lewthwaite died, it passed to his daughter, Mary, who married a banker, Milham Hartley. It then passed to Milham's son, John, and following his death, it was acquired, in 1847, by the Whitehaven Hematite Iron Company who sold it to the Trustees of the Town and Harbour of Whitehaven, the body which then administered the town.

The building was then substantially remodelled to a design by William Barnes to convert it into a municipal building in 1851. The new design involved a symmetrical main frontage with five bays facing onto Duke Street; the central section of three bays, which slightly projected forward, featured a single-storey tetrastyle portico with Tuscan order columns supporting an entablature. There were Venetian windows in the outer bays on the ground floor and sash windows flanked by brackets supporting cornices in all the bays on the first floor with the central sash window featuring a segmental pediment. At roof level there was a cornice and a parapet.

After significant population growth, largely associated with the growing importance of the town as a sea port, the area became a municipal borough in 1894. In 1895, the new borough council bought the town hall from the trustees. A separate events venue and theatre known as the Civic Hall was completed in 1953 in Lowther Street. Prince Philip, Duke of Edinburgh, attended a reception at the town hall on 24 November 1955.

After local government reorganisation in 1974, the town hall became one of several buildings used by the new Copeland Borough Council. In the mid-1980s, the council consolidated its offices in Catherine Street, after which the town hall fell into a state of disrepair. The building was acquired, refurbished and brought back into use by British Nuclear Fuels Ltd (BNFL) who let it as a courthouse to HM Courts and Tribunals Service in 1996. BNFL sold it to a West Cumbrian investor, while it was still in use as a courthouse, in 2005. After HM Courts and Tribunals Service moved out of the building in 2010, and following a further refurbishment, it was let to the American engineering design firm, AECOM, in 2017.

== See also ==
- Listed buildings in Whitehaven
