= Newbiggin, Kirkby Thore =

Village in Cumbria, England

Coordinates: 54.64999°N 2.57730°W

Newbiggin
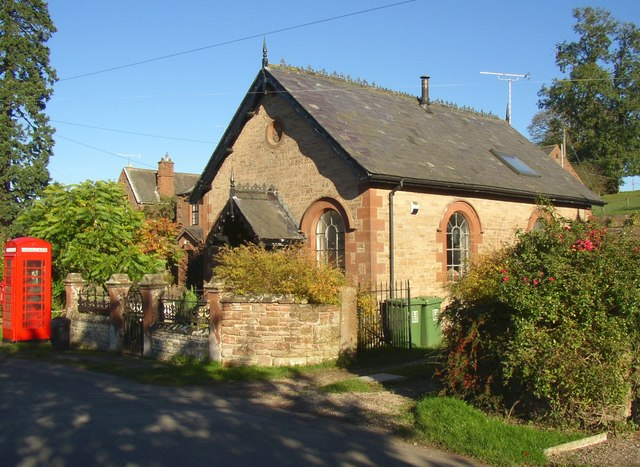
- The former Wesleyan chapel

- Location in Eden, Cumbria Location within Cumbria
- Population: 96 (2001)
- OS grid reference: NY6228
- Civil parish: Newbiggin
- Unitary authority: Westmorland and Furness
- Ceremonial county: Cumbria
- Region: North West
- Country: England
- Sovereign state: United Kingdom
- Post town: PENRITH
- Postcode district: CA10
- Dialling code: 01768
- Police: Cumbria
- Fire: Cumbria
- Ambulance: North West
- UK Parliament: Westmorland and Lonsdale

Newbiggin is a village and civil parish near the larger village of Temple Sowerby, in the Westmorland and Furness unitary authority and the ceremonial county of Cumbria. In 2001 it had a population of 96. From 1974 to 2023 it was in Eden district.

Newbiggin station opened in 1876 and closed in 1970.

== See also ==
- Listed buildings in Newbiggin, Kirkby Thore
