= Gamblesby =

Village in Cumbria, England

Coordinates: 54.749°N 2.608°W

- Village
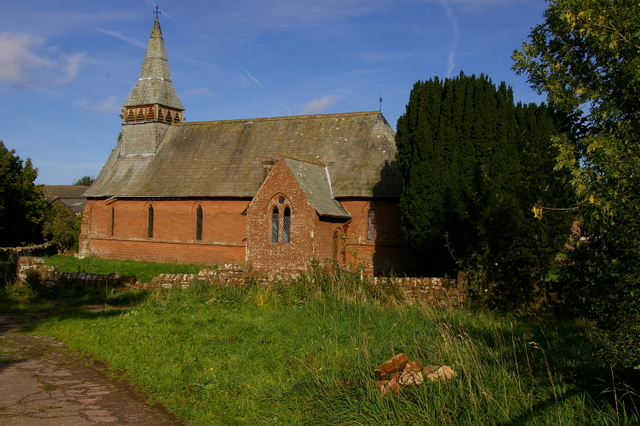
- St. John's Church, now a house

- Location in the former Eden District Location within Cumbria
- Population: 197 National Survey 1931
- OS grid reference: NY608395
- Civil parish: Glassonby
- Unitary authority: Westmorland and Furness
- Ceremonial county: Cumbria
- Region: North West
- Country: England
- Sovereign state: United Kingdom
- Post town: PENRITH
- Postcode district: CA10
- Dialling code: 01768
- Police: Cumbria
- Fire: Cumbria
- Ambulance: North West
- UK Parliament: Penrith and Solway

Gamblesby is a village near Melmerby, and former civil parish, now in the parish of Glassonby, in the Westmorland and Furness district, in the ceremonial county of Cumbria, England. It appears first in written records in 1177 as Gamelesbi, and in 1212 as Gamelesby. Originally a township of the ancient parish of Addingham, Gamblesby was a civil parish in its own right from 1866 until 1934. In 1931 the parish had a population of 197.

The village's former church, St. John's, is now a private house.

There are several large houses, also there are others that are smaller but all with gardens. Plenty of land surrounds the area which supports either livestock or crops for farming. The village has a road passing through which leads to Unthank, Glassonby and Melmerby.

== See also ==
- Listed buildings in Glassonby
