= St John's Church, Gamblesby =

St. John's Church
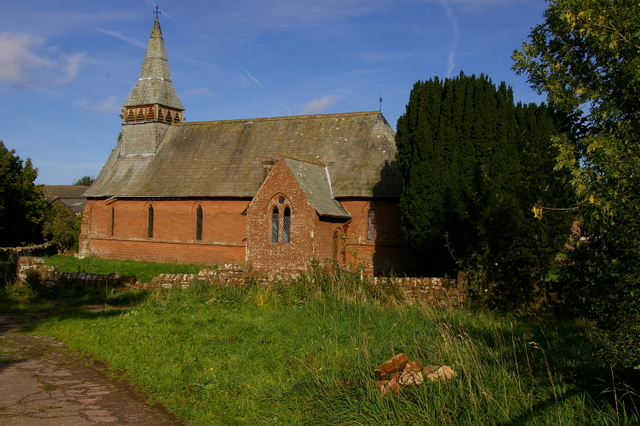
- Interactive map of the St. John's Church area

General information
- Status: Converted to residential dwelling
- Type: Church
- Architectural style: Gothic Revival
- Location: Gamblesby, England
- Coordinates: 54.747029°N 2.607920°W
- Completed: 1868
- Renovated: 2010–2011
- Cost: £1075 19s 10d
- Client: Church of England

Design and construction
- Designations: Grade II listed

St. John's Church was a Victorian parish Church of England church in the village of Gamblesby, Cumbria, England.

The Gothic Revival-style church, with tall spire, lancet windows and external buttresses, was built as a chapel-of-ease to the church at Addingham, in response to the local growth of Methodism, in 1868, on land granted by the Duke of Devonshire at the behest of its first vicar, the Reverend Brown. The construction cost £1075 19s 10d (£1075.99), raised through voluntary contributions.

Its geometrical and floral three-light East apse, by John Scott was its only stained glass.

After being decommissioned, the grade II-listed building was converted into a private residence, in 2010–2011. The conversion featured in George Clarke's Channel 4 television series The Restoration Man.
