= Charles John Ferguson =

English architect

- Born: 1840; Carlisle, Cumbria
- Died: 1 December 1904 (aged 63–64)
- Occupation: Architect

Charles John Ferguson (usually known as C. J. Ferguson) (1840 – 1 December 1904) was an English architect who practised mainly in Carlisle, Cumbria. He was the younger son of Joseph Ferguson of Carlisle, and was articled to the architect and surveyor John A. Cory. (Note: John A. Cory had offices in Carlisle and Durham, and was county surveyor of Cumberland between 1862 and 1868 before he joined in partnership with Ferguson.) He spent some years in partnership with Cory, but most of his career was in single-handed practice. From about 1902 he also had an office in London.

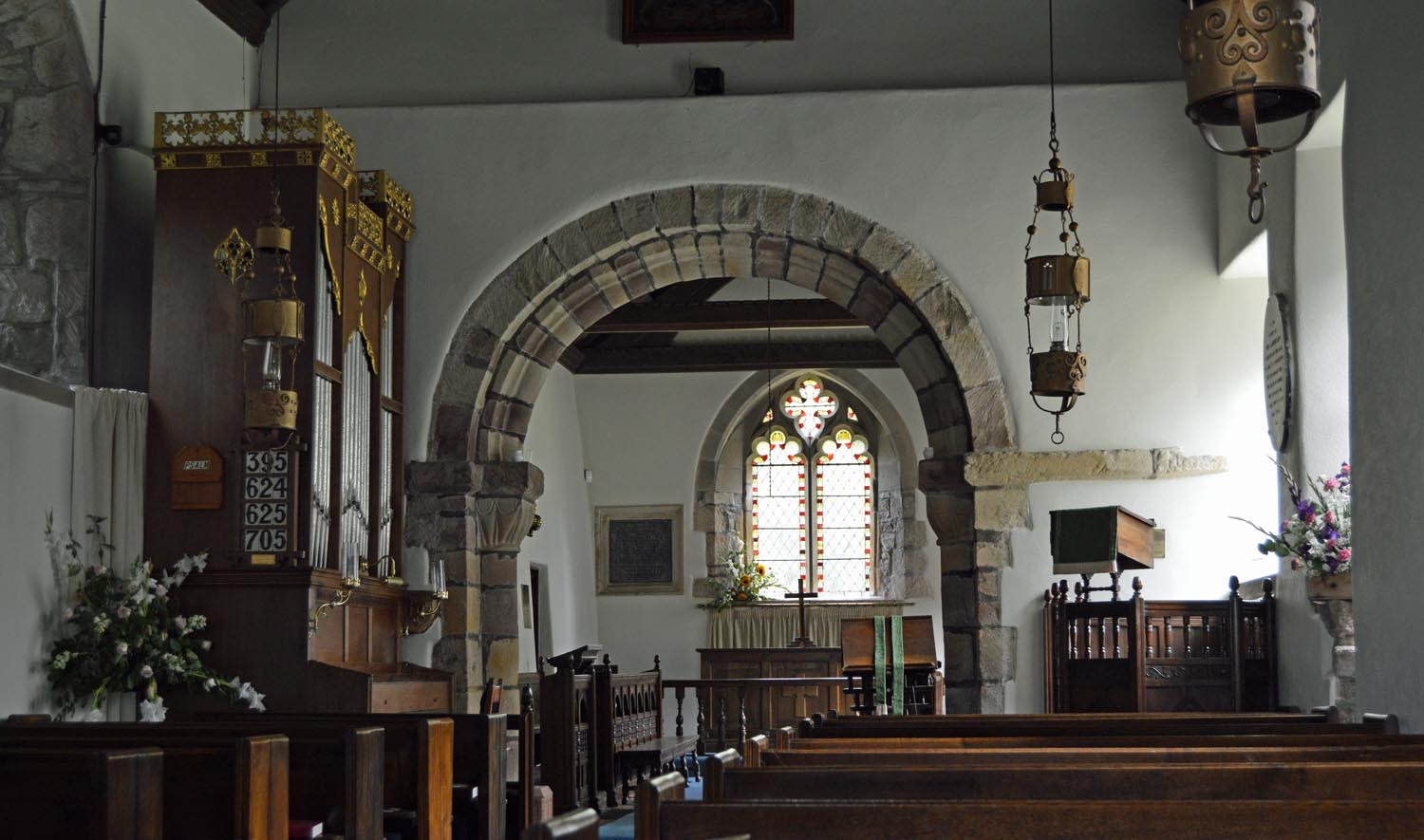
The interior of St Michael and All Angels' Church, Isel, Cumbria

Ferguson's output included new churches, restoration of existing churches, and work on country houses and public buildings. The architectural styles he used were mainly Gothic and Norman Revival. Almost all his works are in what is now Cumbria, with a few isolated commissions elsewhere. The latter were obtained through personal contacts, for example his work for William Armstrong at Bamburgh Castle, Northumberland, and for J. J. Bibby of the Bibby Line in Shropshire. In the Buildings of England series Ferguson is described as being "a resourceful as well as a sensitive architect".

== See also ==
- List of works by C. J. Ferguson

== Notes and references ==
Notes

Citations

Sources

- Curwen, John F. (1932), "Appendices: Architects of note", The Later Records relating to North Westmorland – or the Barony of Appleby, University of London & History of Parliament Trust
- Hyde, Matthew; Pevsner, Nikolaus (2010) [1967], Cumbria, The Buildings of England, New Haven and London: Yale University Press, ISBN 978-0-300-12663-1
- Newman, John; Pevsner, Nikolaus (2006), Shropshire, The Buildings of England, New Haven and London: Yale University Press, ISBN 0-300-12083-4
