= Milecastle 50TW =

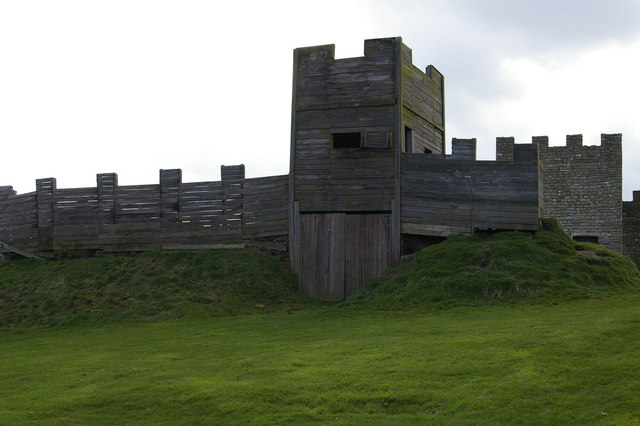
- A reconstruction of a turf wall milecastle gateway at Vindolanda

- Location within Cumbria
- 54.985551°N 2.615428°W
- Type: Milecastle
- Location: Cumbria, England

Milecastle 50TW (High House) was a milecastle on the Turf Wall section of Hadrian's Wall (grid reference NY60716583). The milecastle is located close to the Birdoswald Roman Fort and is unique in that it was not replaced by a stone milecastle when the turf wall was upgraded to stone, the replacement wall instead running some 200m to the north. The milecastle was partially demolished by the Romans after it was abandoned. The milecastle was excavated in 1934 and several Roman rubbish pits discovered. The remains of the two turrets associated with this milecastle (which were demolished when the turf wall was abandoned) have also been located. As the turf wall lies some distance from the stone wall, the sites are not accessible from the Hadrian's Wall Path.

== Description ==
Milecastle 50TW was constructed as part of the turf wall section of Hadrian's Wall, and is situated to the west of Birdoswald fort. It is unique in being the only original turf wall milecastle where the stone wall milecastle built to replace it was not constructed on the same site; this is due to the divergent nature of the original turf wall, and replacement stone wall at this reach. The replacement stone wall milecastle, milecastle 50 was built some 200 metres (220 yd) to the north.

All milecastles on the turf wall section of Hadrian's Wall were thought to have been constructed with turf ramparts, with a wooden tower over the north gate. There are no visible remains of Milecastle 50TW, however a corresponding causeway across the wall ditch is discernible; one of only two milecastles where such a structure survives, the other being Milecastle 25. A wooden culvert was initially used to allow water to flow beneath the causeway, but this was later replaced with a stone culvert.

== Construction ==
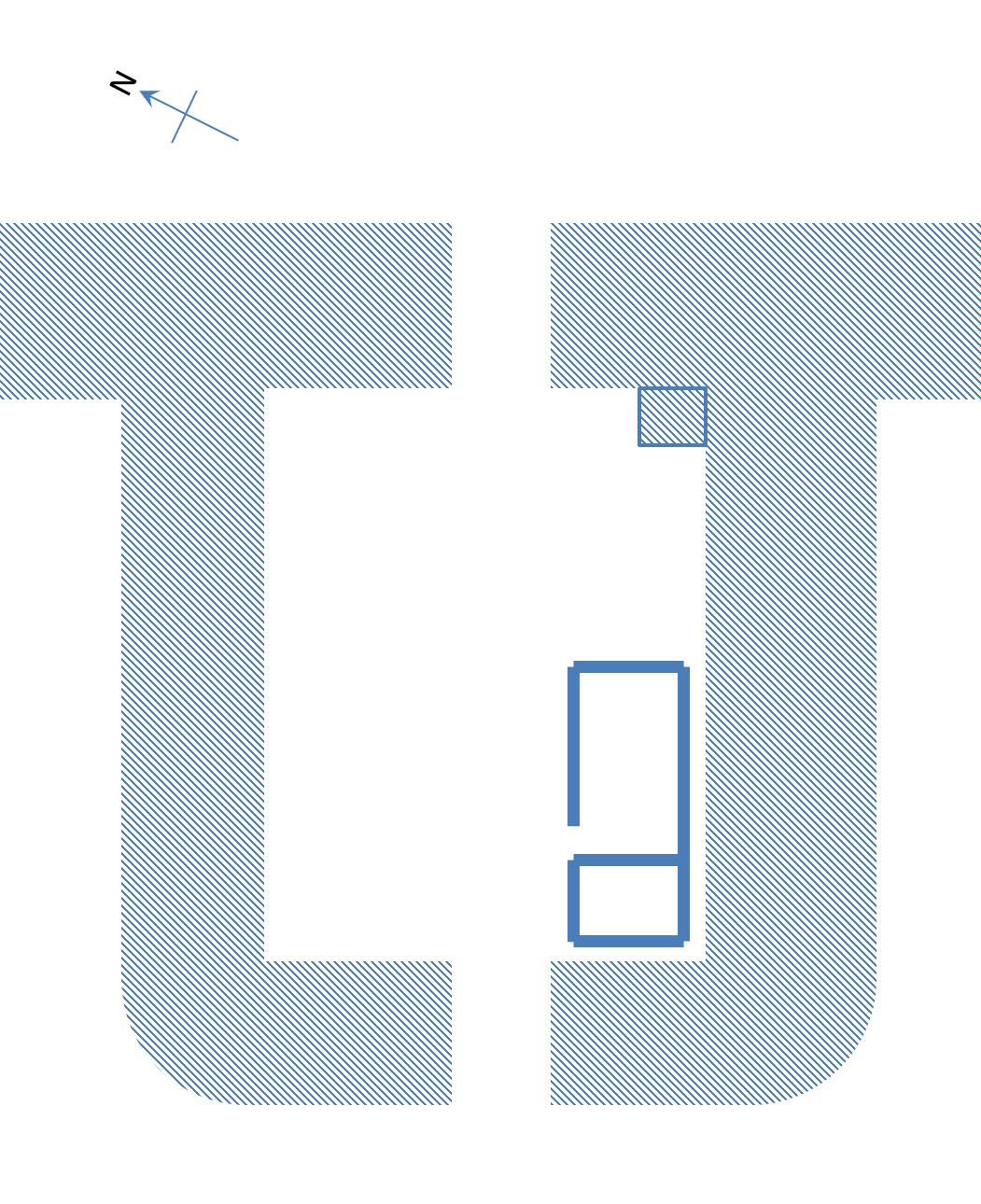
An approximate plan of the ramparts and internal structures of Milecastle 50TW

Milecastle 50TW measured 20.12 metres (66.0 ft) x 16.76 metres (55.0 ft) (long-axis type). The ramparts measured 6.1 metres (20 ft) at the base. The north gateway(similarly sized to a Turret) was found to contain five square posts at each side (each measuring 23 centimetres (9.1 in) on a side), whereas the south gateway was of a smaller area, and only contained three posts on each side. It has been speculated that the additional posts were used to support the extra weight imposed by a tower above the north gateway, not required over the south gateway.

Evidence of an internal timber structure (dimensions 9.14 metres (30.0 ft) x 3.66 metres (12.0 ft) was identified in the eastern side of the milecastle (southern end). The structure was divided into two unequal rooms, each containing the remains of a hearth. A better used hearth was located outside, and to the north of this structure. A large pot was discovered set into the ground, and connected to a drain, beside the south gate. It is presumed that this was used as a latrine. A stairway base (located in the north eastern corner of the milecastle) was also discovered.

=== Vallum ===
The vallum ditch and south mound divert to the south to accommodate the milecastle. The north vallum mound (absent from Milecastle 49 westwards), restarts at Milecastle 50TW's west rampart. A stone-revetted causeway was constructed across the vallum ditch, with a corresponding gap in the south mound. This was later replaced with a wider crossing.

== Demolition ==
As part of the first phase of extension of the stone wall westwards from Milecastle 49, Milecastle 50TW was demolished. The evidence found during the 1934 excavation indicated a purposeful dismantling of both gates, and the digging of pits to bury bedding, and other detritus.

== Excavations and investigations ==
- 1933 – Nothing was found at the measured position of Milecastle 50TW, though a smooth platform slightly to the west was noticed, and trenches dug. This revealed cobbled foundations and 2nd century pottery.
- 1934 – The platform was fully excavated and the construction details established. The demolition process was noted, including the contents of pits dug to dispose of rubbish, including:.
  - The remains of bedding
  - The damaged leaf of a wooden writing tablet
  - A bundle of leather tent fragments
  - A broken drinking mug
  - A fragment of an inscription cut into an oak panel. This is thought to include parts of the names of the Emperor Hadrian and the Governor, Aulus Platorius Nepos. (R.I.B.# 1935).
- 1971 – English Heritage Field Investigation. Lack of visible remains was noted, and the location of the site confirmed.
- 1990 – The site was revisited as part of the Hadrian's Wall Project. No visible remains were identified, with the exception of the causeway across the ditch.

== Associated turrets ==
Each milecastle on Hadrian's Wall had two associated turret structures. These turrets were positioned approximately one-third and two-thirds of a Roman mile to the west of the Milecastle, and would probably have been manned by part of the milecastle's garrison. The turrets associated with Milecastle 50TW are known as Turret 50A TW and Turret 50B TW. Both turrets were demolished when the turf wall was replaced with a stone wall.

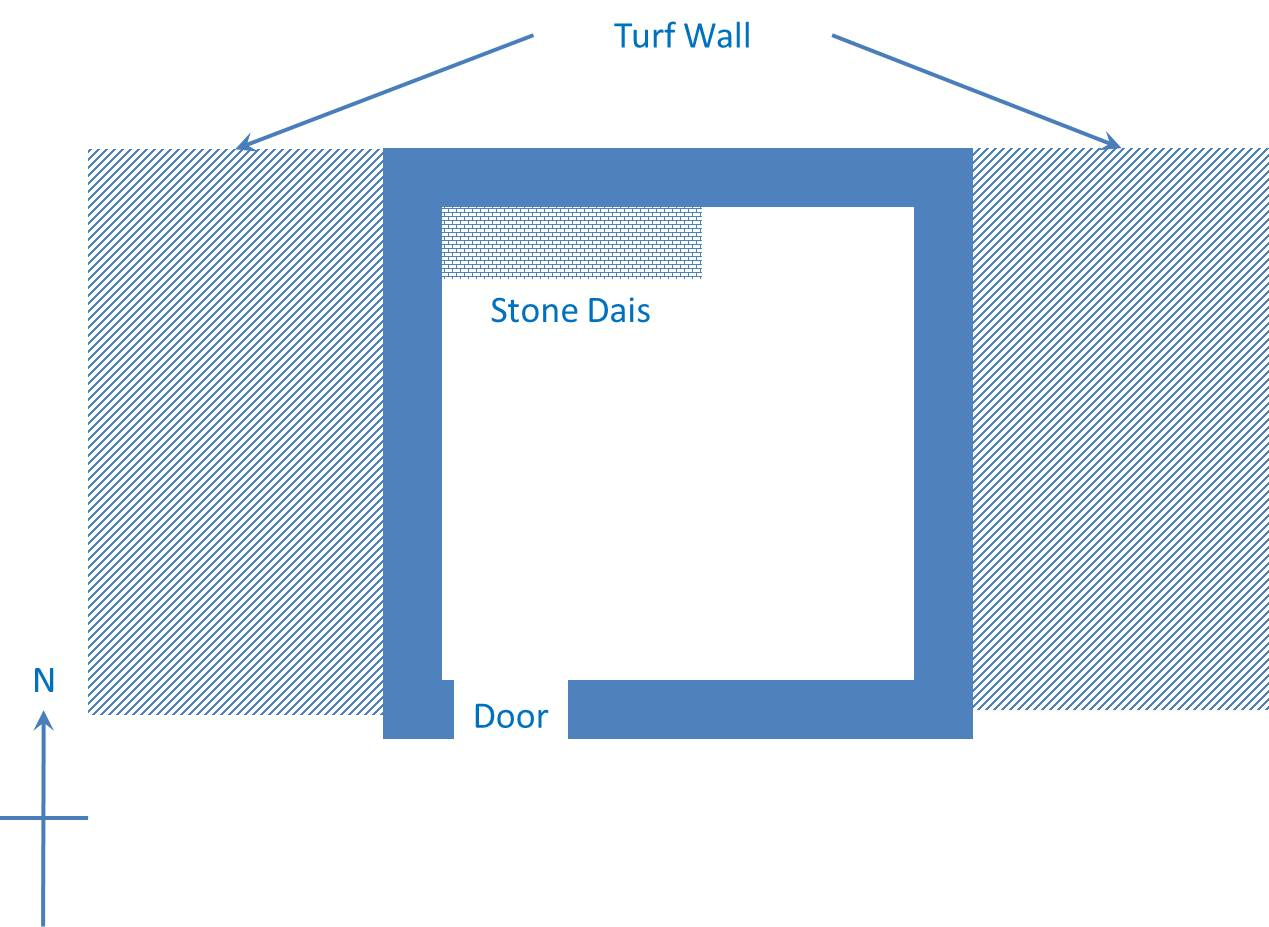
Typical plan of a turf wall turret

=== Turret 50A TW ===
Turret 50A TW was discovered in 1934, located 507 yards (464 m) west of Milecastle 50TW. Sufficient trace of Turret 50A TW survived demolition to establish that the walls were 76 centimetres (30 in) wide, and the structure had approximate external dimensions of 20 feet (6.1 m) square.

Location: 54.984258°N 2.622283°W (Ordnance Survey National Grid Coordinates: NY 6027 6569)>

=== Turret 50B TW ===
The remains of Turret 50B TW were located 522 yards (477 m) east of Milecastle 51. Its external dimensions were 20 feet (6.1 m) square, and the north and south faces both contained a plinth. A hearth was discovered a little to the east of centre of the floor. This suggests that the door may have been located on the west of the south wall.

Location: 54.983365°N 2.629879°W (Ordnance Survey National Grid Coordinates: NY 597 655)>

== Monument records ==
Monument	Monument Number	English Heritage Archive Number
Milecastle 50TW	14014	NY 66 NW 21
Turret 50A TW	14017	NY 66 NW 22
Turret 50B TW	12635	NY 56 NE 10

== Public access ==
Although there are no visible remains at any of the three sites, they are all visible (but not accessible) from the Hadrian's Wall path. The nearest accessible parking is at Birdoswald.

== Bibliography ==
- Daniels, Charles (1979), "Review: Fact and Theory on Hadrian's Wall", Britannia, 10: 357–364, doi:10.2307/526069, JSTOR 526069
