= Milecastle 49 =

Roman fort in Britain

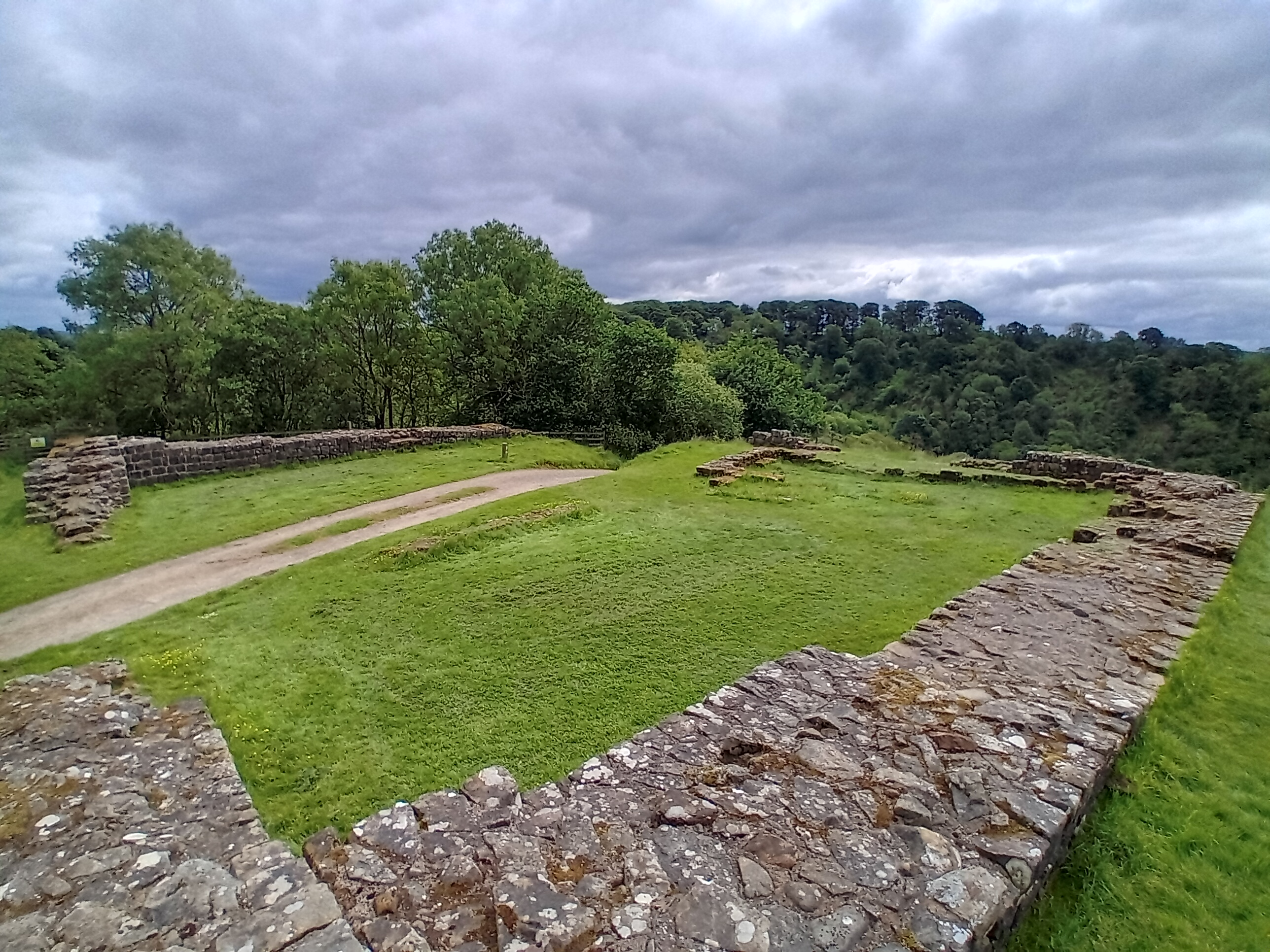
- The remains of Milecastle 49

- Location within Cumbria
- 54.990793°N 2.594987°W
- Type: Milecastle
- Location: Cumbria, England

Milecastle 49 (Harrows Scar) was a milecastle on Hadrian's Wall (grid reference NY6202866407).

== Description ==
Milecastle 49 is immediately west of the gorge of the River Irthing where the Wall was carried over the river by the bridge at Willowford. The scar or cliff and hence the milecastle are named after an ancient tenement called The Harrows which stood nearby. The tenement is shown on William Howard's 1603 map of the Barony of Gilsland and on an estate map of The Shaws commissioned by John Carrick around 1800.

Harrows Scar measures 19.8 metres east to west by 22.9 metres north to south and no contemporary internal buildings are now visible. It is built with narrow gauge defensive walls which are bonded with the Narrow Wall curtain of Hadrian's Wall on either side. It has Type III gateways. It lies 1458m west of Milecastle 48 and 1391m east of Milecastle 50.

The monument is currently in the care of English Heritage. It was designated as a Scheduled Monument (number:13987) on 14 July 1997.

== Excavations ==
It was excavated in 1898, and in 1953 by I. A. Richmond, when parts of the underlying Turf Wall milecastle (49TW) were identified.

== Associated turrets ==
Each milecastle on Hadrian's Wall had two associated turret structures. These turrets were positioned approximately one-third and two-thirds of a Roman mile to the west of the Milecastle, and would probably have been manned by part of the milecastle's garrison. The turrets associated with Milecastle 49 are known as Turret 49A and Turret 49B.

=== Turret 49A ===
Turret 49A (TW) (grid reference NY61546628) was constructed when the turf wall was built. The turret was demolished when the Birdoswald fort was built. Traces of it were found during investigations in 1945. Turret 49A was located on or near the headquarters building. There are no visible remains of the turret.

=== Turret 49B ===
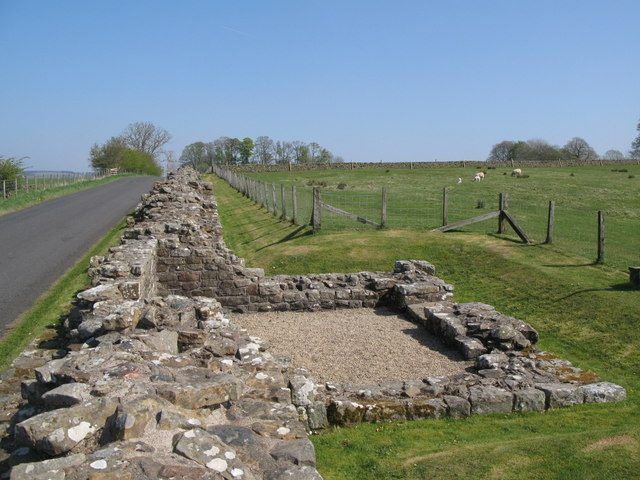
Turret 49B

Turret 49B (Birdoswald) (grid reference NY61136620) lies 340 metres west of the west rampart of Birdoswald fort. It was excavated in 1911. The masonry remains have been consolidated and exposed. It replaced the earlier turf wall turret (49B TW; grid reference NY61146607) which was dismantled when the stone wall was built.
