= Birdoswald =

Farmhouse in Waterhead, Cumbria, England

Coordinates: 54.9897°N 2.6032°W

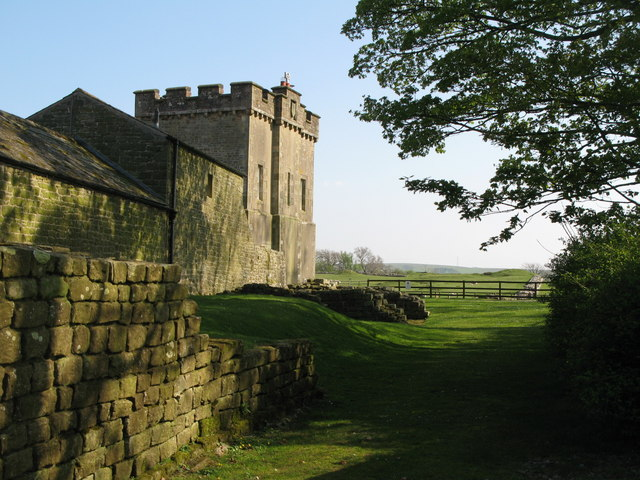

Birdoswald is a former farm in the civil parish of Waterhead in the English county of Cumbria. It stands on the site of the Roman fort of Banna.

== Middle Ages ==
Birdoswald first appears in the written record in 1211 when Walter de Beivin was farming the property, then part of the Barony of Gilsland. He gave land in the area to Lanercost Priory and his nephew Ralph de Birdoswald indicating he had a house there. It was a convenient location, for the thick stone walls of the old Roman fort subsequently provided protection for generations of farmers in a Scottish border area that remained marginal and dangerous territory. By 1425, the farm was in the hands of the Vaux family who were probably the builders of a large pele tower found during excavation. The old Roman west gate was also still in use at this time, but it had collapsed by the end of the century.

== Early modern period ==
In the 1580s, the farm was home to the Tweddle family who replaced the pele tower with a bastle house, a common form of border farmhouse with living quarters on the first floor above a livestock barn at ground level. It was the best defence against raids from neighbouring reivers. In fact the Tweddles themselves were probably reivers for Robert and Hobbe Tweddle appeared in typical reiver dress at a 1581 muster. They were certainly attacked on a number of recorded occasions by the notorious Elliot and Nixon families from Liddesdale. The door to their bastle house was hacked down and burnt and numerous cattle stolen. Even during such troubled times, the site of the Roman fort was visited by an early antiquarian, Reginald Bainbridge.

== Current farmhouse ==
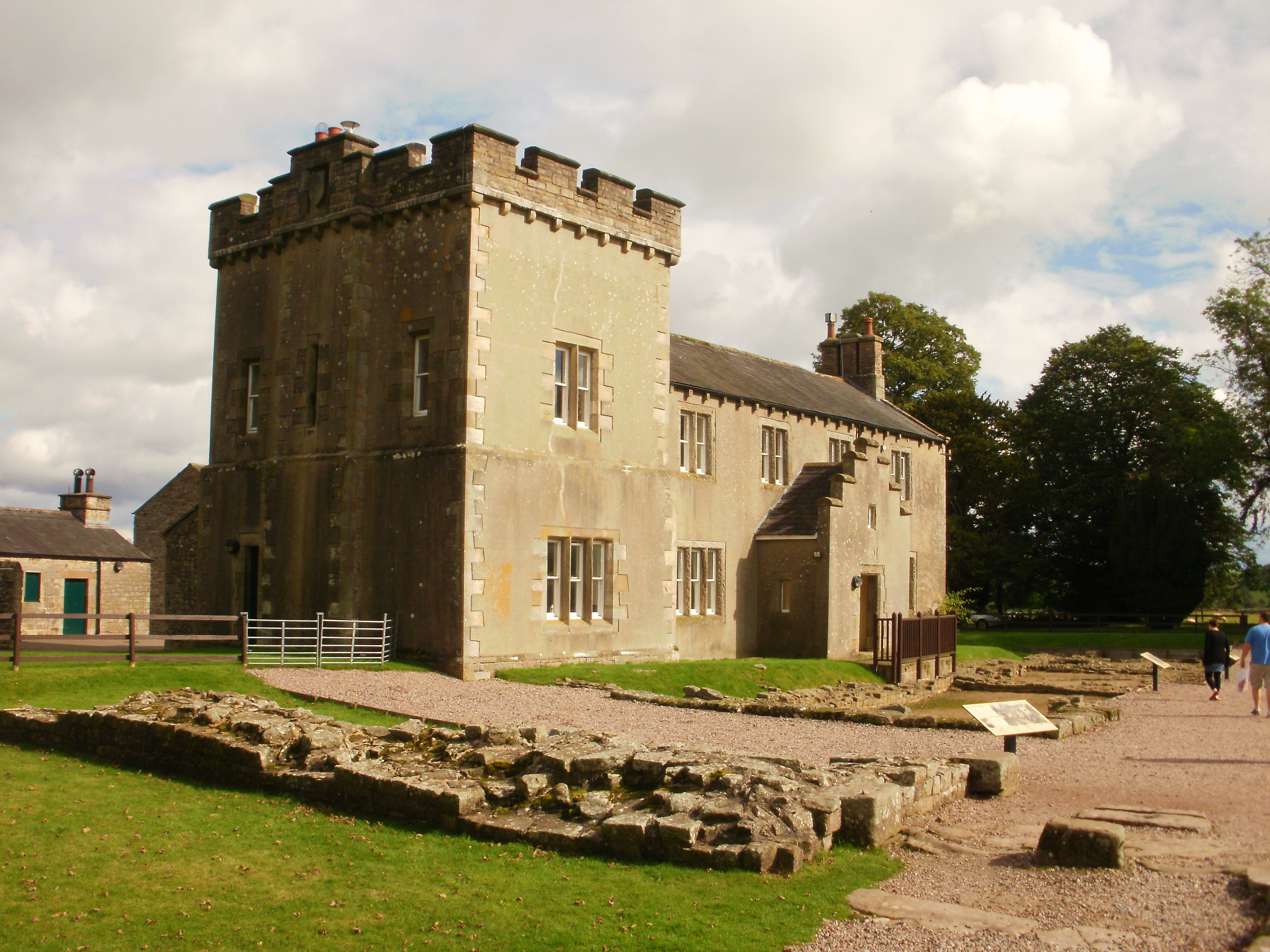
The farmhouse

In the late 17th century, the basis of the present farmhouse was built. The main part of the building was added in 1745 by Anthony Bowman and his wife, as still recorded on an inscribed stone. The antiquarian, John Horsley, visited the site not long before and William Hutton was there in 1802. In 1830, Thomas Crawhall bought the farm and, ten years later, Henry Norman. Both were interested in the old fort and instigated excavations. In 1858, Norman turned a rather plain farmhouse into a somewhat grander building, complete with mock medieval pele tower. The property was later sold to Lord Henley and let to tenants. The last of these left in 1984, when the farmhouse became a youth hostel and museum and much of the Roman fort was laid out for public display.
