= Milecastle 48 =

Milecastle on Hadrian's Wall in England

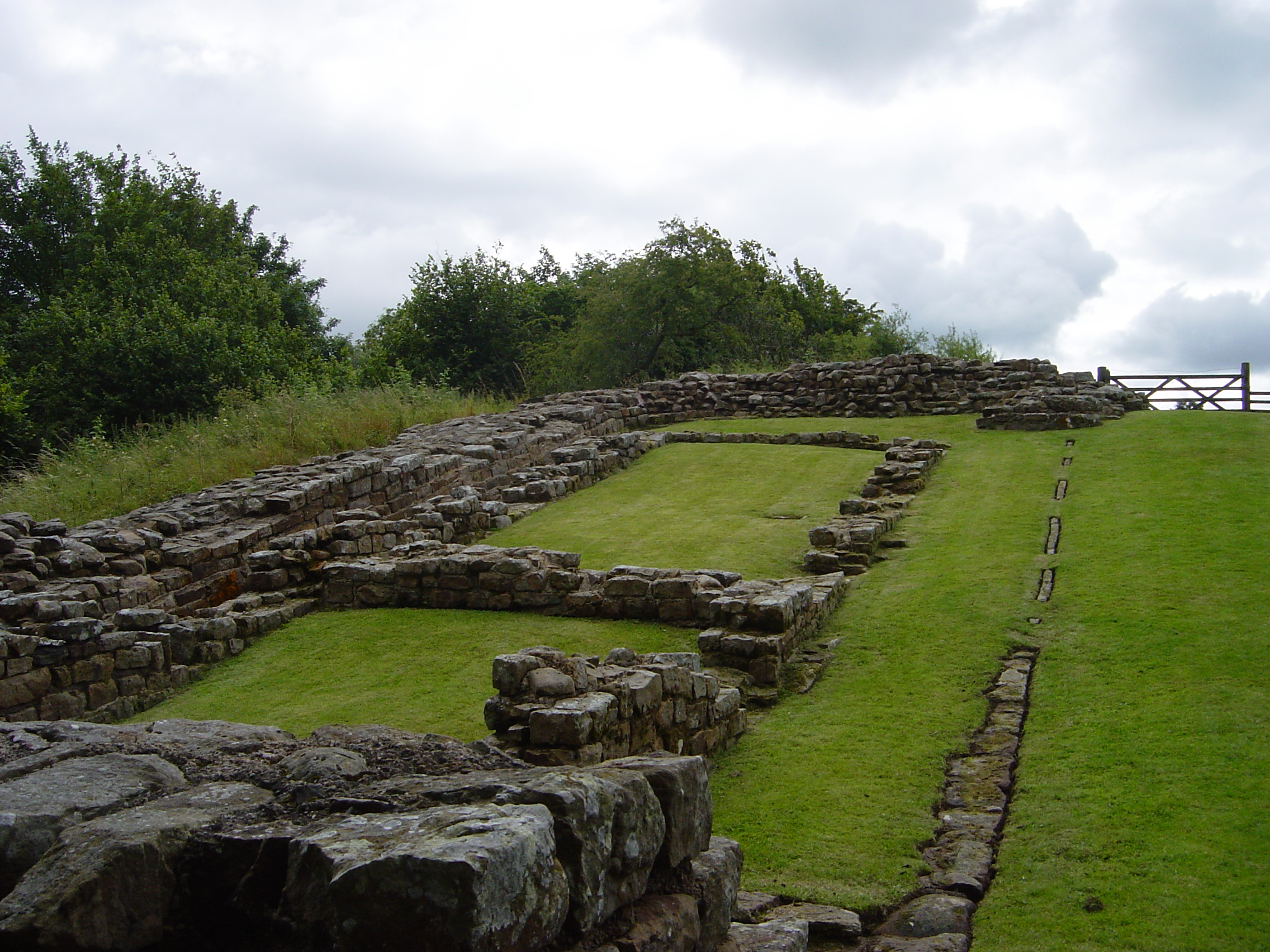
- The remains of Milecastle 48, showing that it was built on a steep slope

- Location within Cumbria
- 54.988991°N 2.573425°W
- Type: Milecastle
- Location: Cumbria, England

Milecastle 48 (Poltross Burn) is a milecastle on Hadrian's Wall (grid reference NY6340666195). Its remains lie near the village of Gilsland in Cumbria where it was historically known as "The King's Stables", owing to the well-preserved interior walls. Unusually, a substantial section of stone stairs has survived within the milecastle. The two turrets associated with this milecastle have also survived as above-ground masonry.

== Description ==
Milecastle 48 is just outside the village of Gilsland in Cumbria, immediately adjacent to the Tyne Valley railway line on its south side (grid reference NY6340666195). It had been known locally as "The King's Stables" for over 100 years, but recently the heritage industry has begun to call it Poltross Burn Milecastle, which is how it is now signposted. The monument is currently in the care of English Heritage.

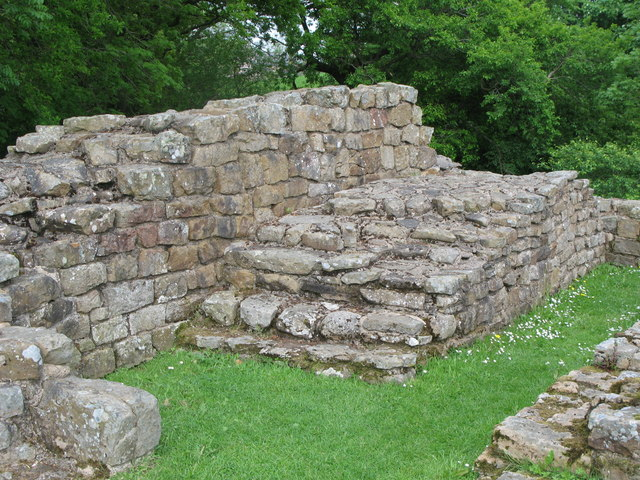
Remains of a flight of stairs to the presumed walkway, which have been used to calculate the height of the completed Hadrian's Wall

The milecastle measures 18.5 metres east to west by 21.3 metres north to south, substantially larger than many other milecastles. Two rows of buildings are visible within, probably barracks, one either side of the north–south road running through the gateways. Interior buildings are not normally so well-preserved or substantial in other milecastles and local people, "mining" the milecastle for building stone in the past, may have recognised the layout as similar to stable-blocks. The walls are broad gauge, including stub 'wing walls' which connect with the Narrow Wall curtain of Hadrian's Wall on either side. It has Type III gateways and lies 1521m west of Milecastle 47 and 1458m east of Milecastle 49.

A notable feature of this milecastle is the survival of a substantial part of the flight of stairs giving access to the ramparts of Hadrian's Wall in the north-east corner, allowing a wall-walk height of 3.6m to be projected and suggesting a height for the curtain wall (including parapet) of around 4.6m.

The Stanegate Roman road, which preceded Hadrian's Wall, crossed the Poltross Burn a few hundred yards to the south of Milecastle 48; part of its route can be seen descending a field to the river's edge. The minor Stanegate fort of Throp stood on top of the ridge just to the southwest of Milecastle 48, but it is not visible on the ground.

== Excavations ==
Milecastle 48 was excavated in 1886 by R. S. Ferguson; between 1909 and 1911 by J. P. Gibson and F. G. Simpson; and between 1965 and 1966 by D. Charlesworth.

The excavations uncovered a range of features including the gateways of the milecastle. The lower courses of the flight of steps were found in the northeast corner, and an oven was found in the northwest angle. Flanking the central space of the milecastle stood long barrack blocks, which are believed to have had more than one phase of construction.

== Associated turrets ==
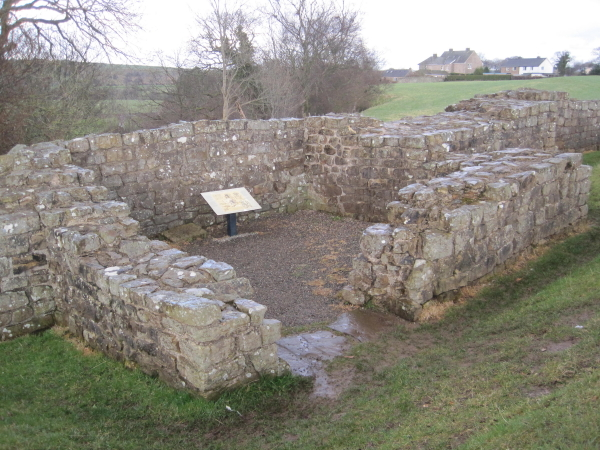
Turret 48A

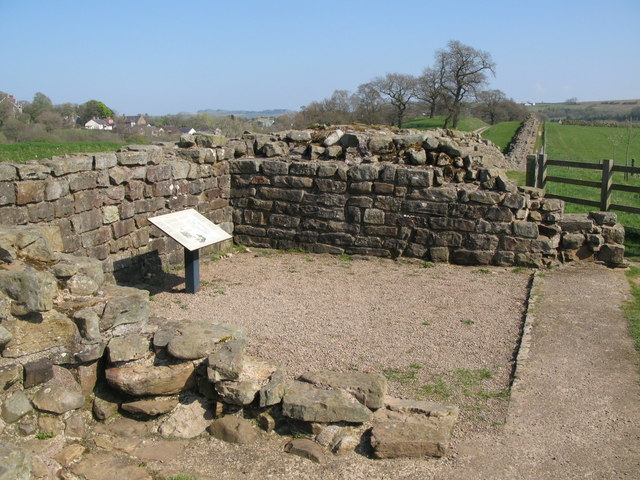
Turret 48B

Each milecastle on Hadrian's Wall had two associated turret structures. These turrets were positioned approximately one-third and two-thirds of a Roman mile to the west of the Milecastle, and would probably have been manned by part of the milecastle's garrison. The turrets associated with Milecastle 48 are known as Turret 48A and Turret 48B.

=== Turret 48A ===
Turret 48A (Willowford East) (grid reference NY6296266297) is situated on a river terrace on the south bank of the River Irthing. It was excavated in 1923. It measures approximately 4.1 metres (13 ft) across. The north wall has a maximum height of 1.3 metres (4 ft 3 in), the east wall 7 courses, the west wall 5 courses and the south wall 6 courses high. The doorway was situated in the southwest wall, and several hearths and evidence of bronze and ironworking were found in the interior. The site was cleared and partially rebuilt in 1951/2, and the remains are visible as consolidated masonry.

=== Turret 48B ===
Turret 48B (Willowford West) (grid reference NY62526650) is situated on the south bank of the River Irthing immediately east of Willowford Farm. The turret was excavated in 1923. The remains are visible as consolidated masonry.
