= Milecastle 50 =

Historic site in England

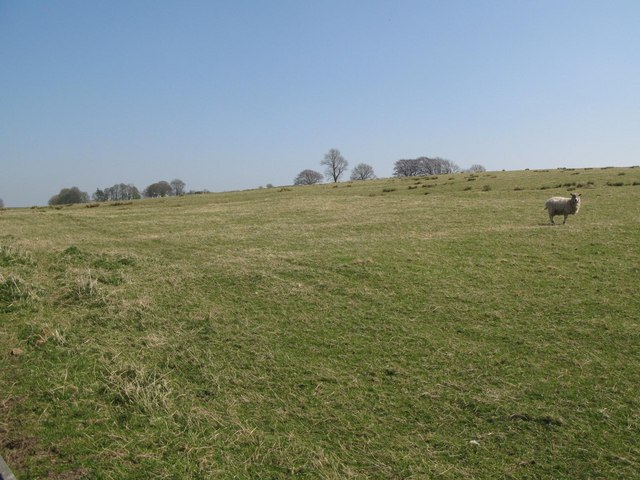
- The site of Milecastle 50

- Location within Cumbria
- 54.987165°N 2.616077°W
- Type: Milecastle
- Location: Cumbria, England

Milecastle 50 (High House) was a milecastle on Hadrian's Wall (grid reference NY60676601).

== Description ==
Milecastle 50 is west of Birdoswald fort. It lies 1391 metres west of Milecastle 49 and 1501 metres east of Milecastle 51. Very little can be seen on the ground other than a ploughed-down earth platform.

== Excavations ==
The milecastle was excavated in 1911. Excavation showed that it measures 18.3 metres east to west by 23.2 metres north to south. It is built with narrow gauge defensive walls, which are bonded into the Narrow Wall curtain of Hadrian's Wall on either side. It has Type III gateways.

The stone milecastle replaced its predecessor, Milecastle 50TW (High House) on the Turf Wall, some 200 metres to the south (grid reference NY60716583). It is the only Turf Wall milecastle without a Stone Wall successor on it. Milecastle 50TW was excavated by F. G. Simpson and I. A. Richmond in 1934. It had turf defensive walls, a timber north tower, and a fragment of a timber construction inscription was recovered recording its construction under Aulus Platorius Nepos.

== Associated turrets ==
Each milecastle on Hadrian's Wall had two associated turret structures. These turrets were positioned approximately one-third and two-thirds of a Roman mile to the west of the Milecastle, and would probably have been manned by part of the milecastle's garrison. The turrets associated with Milecastle 50 are known as Turret 50A and Turret 50B.

=== Turret 50A ===
Turret 50A (High House) (grid reference NY60206586) was excavated in 1911. The north half of the turret is buried beneath the road, and the south half survives as a slight earthwork at the edge of the adjoining field. It replaced the earlier turf wall turret (50A TW; grid reference NY60276569) which was dismantled when the stone wall was built.

=== Turret 50B ===
Turret 50B (Appletree) (grid reference NY59736573) was also excavated in 1911. There are no surface remains visible, but a distinct rise in the south wall of the road marks the point in which it is carried over the south wall of the turret. It replaced the earlier turf wall turret (50B TW; grid reference NY597655) which was dismantled when the stone wall was built.
