= Gilsland Spa =

Coordinates: 55.0024°N 2.5707°W

- Former names: The Shaws
- Alternative names: Gilsland Hall Hotel

General information
- Location: Gilsland, Brampton, Cumbria, CA8 7AR
- Owner: Clear Summer Hospitality Ltd

Gilsland Spa is the name of a former hotel at Gilsland, Cumbria, England. It is named from the sulphurous spring which issues from a cliff below the hotel. The hotel had recently been renamed Gilsland Hall Hotel however it has been empty and disused since 2021.

The hotel sits around 175m above sea level in a meander of the River Irthing and has commanding views out over Gilsland and part of the Irthing valley. In addition to the main building there are outbuildings to the immediate northeast, a set of small cottages and ancillary buildings. To the west there are further outbuildings comprising maintenance buildings, garages, greenhouses and a summer house. Also to the west is Spa Villa, a large self-contained property that is Grade II listed (entry number 1087517). Spa Villa was built in 1815 by Major George Stephenson Mounsey as a summer residence for the hotel, of which he was then the proprietor.

== History ==
Gilsland Spa in the early 19th century

The original hotel was called The Shaws, from an Old English word meaning a small woodland, and was built in the 1760s, although the site and its surrounding farmland have been known by this name since at least 1603. Lord William Howard's map of the Barony of Gilsland of this date shows two buildings near the site of the hotel labelled "Two tenements called the Shaws". Very little is known about the first hotel but one contemporary drawing suggests that it may have had a tower in imitation of the type of fortified house known locally as a peel.

This original Shaws Hotel burned down spectacularly in 1859, and was replaced on a grander scale soon afterwards by G. G. Mounsey, a local landowner and first elected mayor of Carlisle. Around this time, Rose Hill railway station was renamed Gilsland, and the surrounding collection of hamlets became the village of Gilsland, but the hotel continued to be called The Shaws until it was leased to the Gilsland Spa Hotel and Hydro Company of South Shields in 1893. Expensive renovations, including an improved water supply, crippled this company financially, and it failed in 1900. The Co-operative Wholesale Society took over in 1901 to run it as a convalescent home, the Co-operative Group being principal shareholders in the business.

Gilsland Spa hotel frontage

The hotel has been a popular resort since the eighteenth century. Susanna Blamire, the Cumbrian Muse, came to take the waters in the later part of the century and Walter Scott came here in "the season" of 1797 looking for a wife, and found one. The opening of the railway station in 1836 galvanised the village and during the later part of the 19th century and the early 20th, Gilsland was thronged with tourists, many of whom were working-class people from Tyneside. Reviewers of the hotel repeatedly stressed the free and easy way in which the different classes mixed. One of the main attractions, though for reasons no-one is prepared to admit, has been the Popping Stone, an enigmatic stone some half a mile from the hotel in a secluded glade, linked to various courtship and fertility rituals. Next to the stone was the Kissing Bush, an ancient hawthorn which died in the 1940s. These relics and two mineral springs (sulphurous and chalybeate) are situated along the network of wide footpaths known as the Home Walks which provide access to the rugged scenery of the hotel grounds. During its time the hotel has been a First World War military convalescent home and a Second World War maternity hospital and was known locally until recently as "The Home".

== Current Status ==
In December 2017 the Cooperative Society sold Gilsland Spa, together with its sister hotel, The Esplanade in Scarborough. The hotels were bought by the Northern Powerhouse Developments group, who planned major refurbishments. However, companies within the Northern Powerhouse Developments group collapsed into bankruptcy in 2019, and Gilsland Spa, alongside the other hotels owned by the company, were put up for sale by the administrator in July of that year. The hotel was valued at £1.55m and marketed by Christie & Co. The Northern Powerhouse Developments group is currently subject of a major fraud investigation by the Serious Fraud Office. The investigation into suspected fraud and money laundering focused on investments offered in care homes and hotels, including Gilsland Spa, between 2013 and 2019.

Following the collapse of the Northern Powerhouse Developments group the Gilsland Spa property was acquired by Stratsmore Holdings, in the summer of 2021. In January 2023 Stratsmore Holdings applied for planning permission for alterations to the front entrance of the hotel. Permission was granted in March 2023 for removal of the existing single-storey front extension, reinstatement of the former elevation and construction of a new porte-cochere. It is evident from recent pictures that this work was never undertaken.

In November 2024 the Hexham Courant reported the property being sold for £800,000, and in December 2024 Boutique Hotelier reported the property failing to sell at public auction held on 17 December 2024. The property was then listed for auction by Allsop on 20 February 2025; however, the sale was withdrawn. The land registry shows Clear Summer Hospitality Ltd purchased Gilsland Spa (title CU348089) on 21 May 2025 for a value of £1,850,000. There are no apparent links between Clear Summer Hospitality and Clearsprings, the asylum hotel contractor, other than the similarity in name.

Evoke Design & Build Ltd were commissioned to undertake restoration work to some adjoining cottages in the summer of 2025. On the 26 July 2025 a group of urban explorers were attacked and held captive while they were visiting Gilsland Spa. One of the attackers was subsequently convicted of offences in relation to the attack. A Facebook post from Evoke indicated they were demobilising and leaving the site at the end of October 2025.

Gilsland Spa closed for renovations at the end of October 2021 and remains empty and disused to this day. There is no sign that the property is to re-open as a hotel imminently.
