= Poltross Burn =

River in Cumbria, England

Coordinates: 54.9915°N 2.5743°W

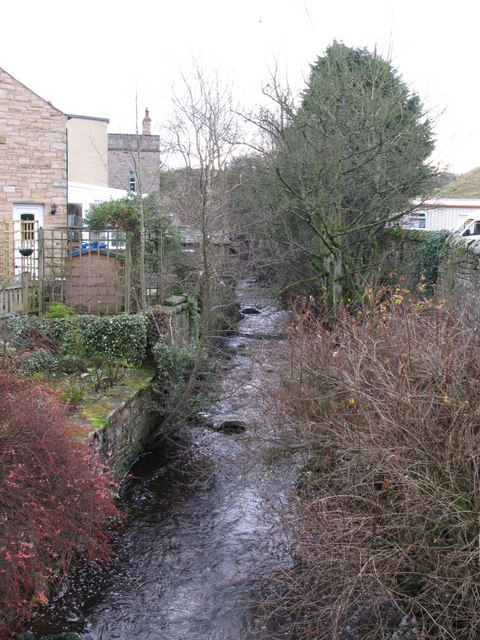
The Poltross Burn at Gilsland

The Poltross Burn is a tributary of the River Irthing. The burn rises on Denton Fell and flows north-east, joining the Irthing at Gilsland. The well-preserved Roman Milecastle 48, a feature of Hadrian's Wall once known locally as The King's Stables, stands on the west bank. It is signposted as Poltross Burn Milecastle, and adjoins the south side of the railway embankment in Gilsland. A 19th-century watermill within the village used the burn as a source of power to grind corn.

The name of the watercourse is recorded in 1637 as deriving from the Celtic word Poltroske.

== See also ==
- Gilsland
