= Gilsland =

Village in Northumberland and Cumbria, England

Coordinates: 54.991°N 2.574°W

- Village
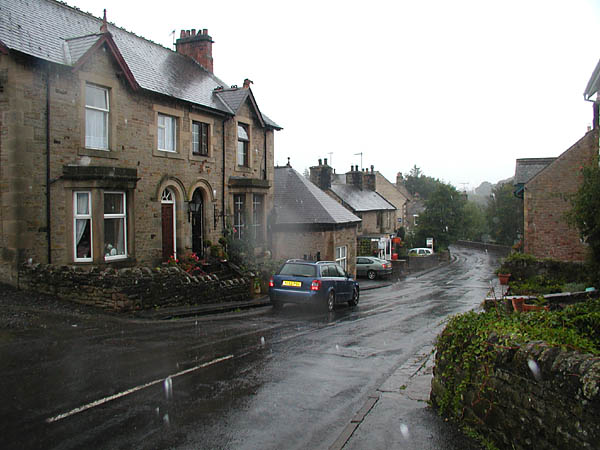
- Gilsland Main Street light snowfall

- Location within Cumbria Location within Northumberland
- OS grid reference: NY633664
- Civil parish: Thirlwall; Upper Denton; Waterhead
- Unitary authority: Northumberland; Cumberland
- Ceremonial county: Northumberland; Cumbria
- Region: North East; North West
- Country: England
- Sovereign state: United Kingdom
- Post town: BRAMPTON
- Postcode district: CA8
- Dialling code: 016977
- Police: Northumbria
- Fire: Northumberland
- Ambulance: North East
- North West
- UK Parliament: Hexham; Carlisle

Gilsland is a village in northern England about 20 miles (32 km) west of Hexham, and about 18 miles (29 km) east of Carlisle, which straddles the border between Cumbria and Northumberland. The village provides an amenity centre for visitors touring Hadrian's Wall and other features of historical interest in this area of rugged Border country, popularised by the Romantic novelist Sir Walter Scott.

Its unusual arrangement of incorporating two unitary councils and three civil parish councils is due to the gradual amalgamation of hamlets during the 19th century. It has a population of about 400, most of whom live on the Northumberland side of the River Irthing and Poltross Burn.

== Toponymy ==
The name Gilsland is first attested around 1165 in forms such as Gillesland. It seems to take its name from a person called Gille, son of Bueth, who is mentioned in the foundation charter of Lanercost Priory, originally meaning 'Gille's land'.

Near Gilsland lies Wardrew. The etymology of this name is uncertain, but the second element is thought to be a Cumbric word corresponding to modern Welsh rhiw 'slope'.

== History ==
As in most areas of Britain, Bronze-Age and Iron-Age settlement in Northumberland is represented by cup and ring marked stones, standing stones and hill forts, though few such monuments, with the possible exception of the Popping Stone, have been found near Gilsland. Recent field-walking activities by a local archaeology group have produced flint artefacts dated to the Bronze Age and Neolithic. The evident antiquity of the civil parish boundaries may also be traceable to the Iron Age.

Gilsland is situated upon Hadrian's Wall, a noted monument constructed by the Roman army in the early part of the second century AD and lately listed as a World Heritage Site. Gilsland is one of the few areas where a large portion of the wall is not accessible, this is not due to crossing private land but because the site is dangerous due to a derelict house and a waste ground. It is here that the wall cannot be maintained due to these dangers. The major Roman fort of Birdoswald lies a couple of miles to the west of Gilsland. The Wall itself was initially of turf from a point to the west of Gilsland, but was eventually replaced in stone.

During the 12th century the area now known as Cumbria passed from the control of the Kingdom of Strathclyde to the English King Henry II. This region was subdivided into baronies, the easternmost of which became the Barony of Gilsland, apparently named after an individual, although sporadic speculation by historians has failed to conclusively identitify him. This barony was ruled by Lord William Howard during the 16/17th century and stretched from Carlisle to the present-day village of Gilsland. Gilsland Spa, a locally renowned mineral spring, was named from the Barony and the name was transferred from there to the village, although most of the population live on the Northumberland side, outside the original borders of the Barony.

The ancient kingdoms of Strathclyde and Northumbria were eventually subsumed into what we now know as Scotland and England, but for most of the later mediaeval period the Borders suffered instability and lawlessness due to their mutual antipathy and the indeterminate nature of the border. There have been many attempts to romanticise the assumed incessant violence, starting with Sir Walter Scott, who visited Gilsland and got engaged at the Popping Stone.

As soon as the area was definitively pacified, with the Union of the Crowns and the suppression of the 1745 Jacobite rebellion, economic activity rapidly increased. The original Gilsland Spa hotel was built in the 1760s, was already a popular summer resort by the 1780s and went on to provide a nucleus for the accumulation of guest-houses which now make up Gisland. The opening of a railway station in 1836 led to a boom in tourism. In the 1860s the name of the station was changed from Rose Hill to Gilsland, and residents of Rosehill, Mumpshall, Crooks, The Gap and surrounding farms and hamlets were invited to think of themselves as a single village, the name having been derived from the surrounding Barony of Gilsland.

== Present ==
Today the village is somewhat isolated with large tracts of forestry and high ground – laced with public footpaths, cycle trails and bridleways – to the north and south. The A69 east-west trunk road runs nearby, providing access to Hexham and Carlisle within half-an-hour by car, or the closer towns of Haltwhistle and Brampton in minutes. Gilsland is poorly served by bus services. The AD122 service (a reference to the date Hadrian commenced the wall) used to call every 2 hours in summer but no longer visits. The 685 bus now bypasses the village. Only the 681 and the Border Rambler services still visit. Only 2 buses a day are now guaranteed. The railway station has been closed for many years and there is a campaign to reopen it.

In the recent past, several small coalmines operated nearby, but occupation has mainly been in farming and building trades, also haulage, and a white-lining business is located in the village. Funding is currently being invested in the development and promotion of the area for tourism, and residents are increasingly offering flourishing 4 and 5-star rated B&B and Guest House accommodation. Some 100 local people earn part or whole of their living from tourism. Hadrian's Wall Heritage Limited – the body charged with maintaining the World Heritage Site corridor – estimate that visitor numbers (already circa 400,000 per annum) are set to rise 8% per annum over the next 3 years, which could be problematical, considering that current numbers are already causing damage to the main attraction.

== Landmarks ==
- Gilsland Spa, a hotel known in the past for its sulphurous spa waters, is close by to the north.
- Poltross Burn Milecastle, a strongpoint of Hadrian's Wall once known locally as The King's Stables, is situated on the outskirts of Gilsland. It lies on the south side of the railway embankment running through the village, near to the Samson Inn.
- Triermain Castle, fragmentary remains dating from the 14th century, lies 3 miles west of Gilsland.
- Thirlwall Castle, a ruin of a medieval castle built from Roman stones, is two miles to the east.

== Sources ==
- Alexander, M. (no date) Gilsland Past & Present; Griffin Press, Gilsland. Compendium of local history, myths & legends and ghost stories.
- Bird, W.G. 1913. Gilsland and Neighbourhood, 3rd Edition; James Gregg, Gilsland. Still the best guide book to Gilsland, by the vicar at the time. 5 editions, 1908, 1910, 1913, 1922, 1927.
- Jenkinson, H.I. 1884. Jenkinson's Practical Guide to Carlisle, Gilsland, Roman Wall, and Neighbourhood; Edward Stanford, London. (Also a first edition, 1875, and "Jenkinson's Smaller Practical Guides" of the same dates.) One of the more useful guides to Gilsland, having a Gilsland section of 113pp. The information appears to have been carefully researched by an author familiar with the area, and the numerous walks described from Gilsland to nearby destinations contain a wealth of detail.
- Mounsey, G.G., [1865], Gillesland; Lonsdale, Carlisle. This is the only competent history of Gilsland, much plagiarised by subsequent writers. It is very rare, but there are copies in Carlisle library and public records office, and the full text is online at Gillesland Online
- Gilsland is frequently mentioned in books about the area, and for a relatively complete annotated list of these see Gilsland Bibliography
