= Milecastle 51 =

Ancient fort in Cumbria, England

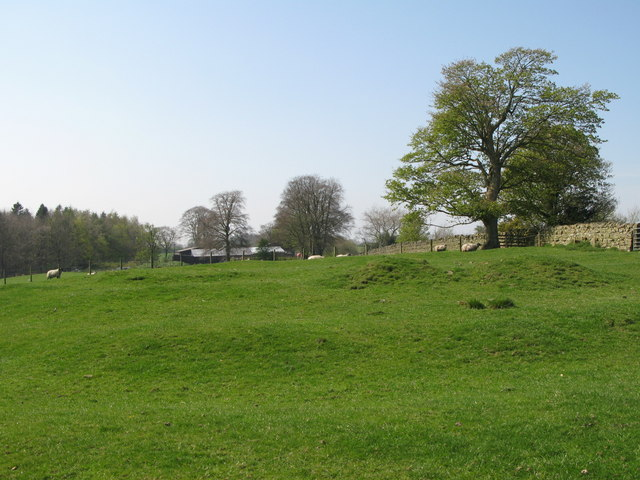
- The site of Milecastle 51

- Location within Cumbria
- 54.982382°N 2.637411°W
- Type: Milecastle
- Location: Cumbria, England

Milecastle 51 (Wall Bowers) was a milecastle on Hadrian's Wall (grid reference NY59306549).

== Description ==
Milecastle 51 is west of Birdoswald fort (grid reference NY59306549), at the point where the Stone Wall rejoins the line of the Turf Wall. It lies 1501m west of Milecastle 50 and 1484m east of Milecastle 52. The remains are in poor condition, consisting of turf covered foundations with traces of a ditch to the east.

== Excavations ==
The milecastle was excavated in 1927, 1934 and 1936. Although not now visible, excavation showed that it had two internal stone barracks buildings. It had Type III gateways.

The stone milecastle replaced its underlying predecessor, Milecastle 51TW, on the Turf Wall.

== Associated turrets ==
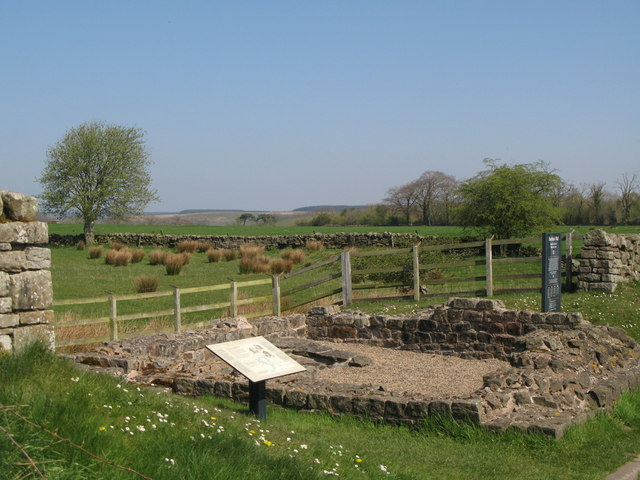
Turret 51A

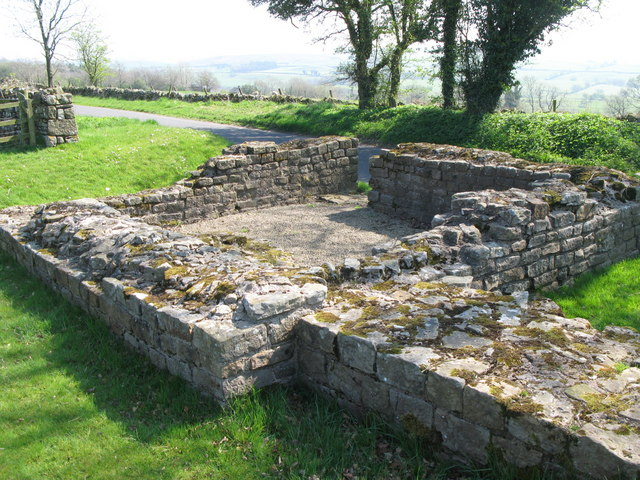
Turret 51B

Each milecastle on Hadrian's Wall had two associated turret structures. These turrets were positioned approximately one-third and two-thirds of a Roman mile to the west of the Milecastle, and would probably have been manned by part of the milecastle's garrison. The turrets associated with Milecastle 51 are known as Turret 51A and Turret 51B.

=== Turret 51A ===
Turret 51A (Piper Sike) (grid reference NY58826530) is of the type normally associated with the Turf Wall, and later replaced in stone. The turret was excavated in 1927 and again in 1970. The entrance was on the east side and a substantial platform against the north wall. Cooking hearths and rubbish were found spread over the rest of the turret. Occupation is not believed to have continued later than the 2nd century AD. The turret was consolidated after 1970 and survives to a maximum height of 0.8 metres.

=== Turret 51B ===
Turret 51B (Leahill) (grid reference NY58386511) measures 4.1 by 4.3 metres. It was excavated in 1927 and again in 1958. It replaced the earlier Turf Wall turret. The stone turret has been consolidated and survives to a maximum height of 1.1 metres.
