= Popping Stone =

Three rounded boulders in Cumbria, England

Coordinates: 55.00668°N 2.57159°W

The Popping Stone today

The Popping Stone is a group of three rounded boulders in the Irthing Gorge near the village of Gilsland. It was not always this shape, however, and photographs from before 1870 show a single, much larger stone that must have been drastically altered soon after this date. Nearly all written references to the Popping Stone mention various traditions associated with courtship and marriage proposals, and usually repeat the legend of (Sir) Walter Scott's proposal to Charlotte Carpenter there in 1797. Close to the Popping Stone was an ancient, gnarled Hawthorn tree named the Kissing Bush, but Aln noted in the early 1940s that this had been cut down.

The Popping Stone in 1861
