= Gilsland railway station =

Disused railway station in Northumberland on the Tyne Valley Line

Gilsland
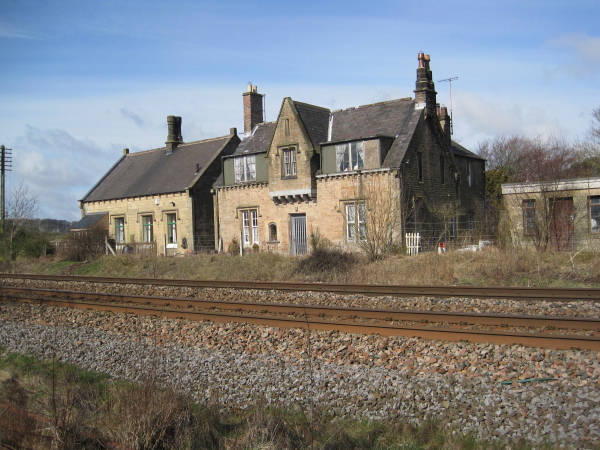

General information
- Location: Gilsland, Northumberland; England
- Coordinates: 54°59′26″N 2°34′12″W
- Grid reference: NY636663
- Platforms: 2
- Tracks: 2

Other information
- Status: Residential

History
- Original company: Newcastle and Carlisle Railway
- Pre-grouping: North Eastern Railway
- Post-grouping: London and North Eastern Railway; British Rail (Eastern Region)

Key dates
- 19 July 1836: Opened as Rose Hill
- 1 May 1869: Renamed Gilsland
- 5 April 1965: Closed to goods
- 2 January 1967: Closed to passengers
Location

Gilsland railway station was a railway station on the Newcastle and Carlisle Railway, on the Carlisle to Hexham section. It was situated near the centre of the village of Gilsland.

== History ==
The line became part of the North Eastern Railway on 17 July 1862, then, at grouping in 1923, it became part of the London and North Eastern Railway.

The station was originally opened on 19 July 1836 when it was known as Rose Hill. It was later renamed Gilsland on 1 May 1869.

After having been proposed for closure in the Beeching report, the station was closed to passengers on 2 January 1967. Goods facilities were withdrawn on 5 April 1965.

== Proposed reopening ==
The potential for the station's reopening was assessed in 2001 and in 2005 in the Tyne Valley Route Strategy. Both studies found that there was a case for reopening, although potential demand was assessed only in relation to the local population and not with regard to possible visitors to Hadrian's Wall.

In May 2013, it was reported that the Tyne Valley Rail Users Group had asked JMP Consultants to assess the potential for the reopening of the station to provide access to Hadrian's Wall. The report was published in August 2013 and concluded that there is an economic case for reopening the station if spending by additional visitors to the area is taken into account.

In March 2020, a bid was made to the Restoring Your Railway fund to get funds for a feasibility study into reinstating the station. This bid was unsuccessful.

Preceding station	Historical railways	Following station
Greenhead	North Eastern Railway; Newcastle and Carlisle Railway	Low Row
