= River Irthing =

River in Cumbria, England

Coordinates: 54°55′N 2°48′W

Irthing
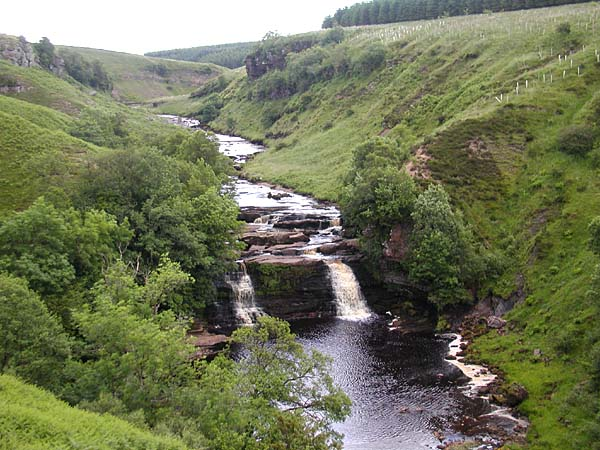
- Crammel Linn waterfall

Location
- Country: United Kingdom
- Constituent country: England

Physical characteristics
- Source
  - location: Paddaburn Moor
- Mouth
  - location: confluence with River Eden

The River Irthing is a river in Cumbria, England and a major tributary of the River Eden. For the first 15 miles of its course it defines the border between Northumberland and Cumbria.

== Etymology ==
The name Irthing may be of Brittonic origin, though its precise etymology is uncertain. The last part of the name is from –ïnn, an adjectival and, in place-names, toponymic suffix, added to nouns or adjectives. The first part may be arth, meaning "a bear" (cf. Welsh arth). Or else, the first part of the name could either one of two elements suffixed with -ed, an early Celtic nominal suffix meaning "having the quality of..". The first of these is, *ar, an ancient river-naming element implying either horizontal motion, "flowing", or else "rising" or "springing up" (compare Irt). The second possibility is *īr, meaning "fresh, clean, pure".

== Geography ==
It is thought that before the last glacial maximum the Irthing flowed into the South Tyne valley through the watershed near Greenhead, now known as the Tyne Gap. This section of the valley is now blocked by a filling of glacial till, diverting the river south west, but the old course has been detected by drilling and echo-sounding. The rapidly eroding cliffs threatening the southern edge of Birdoswald Roman Fort and the fact that the Roman bridge abutment at Willowford is now 44 m (144.4 ft) from the river testify to the instability of the local landscape as it continues to recover from glacial alteration.

The river rises on Paddaburn Moor in Kielder Forest and skirts the eastern edge of Butterburn Flow raised bog. Remains of numerous mediaeval shielings have been found along the banks of these upper reaches, some of which have been given ancient monument status.

For two miles above the village of Gilsland the river flows through the Irthing Gorge, flanked by mainly sandstone crags. Within the upper section of this gorge lies the spectacular 7.6 metre (25 feet) Crammel Linn waterfall. Peregrine falcons and ravens nest near the waterfall and derelict military structures, probably pump-houses supplying water for the Blue Streak rocket site at RAF Spadeadam, can be seen just upstream. Further downstream, in the grounds of Gilsland Spa hotel, the crags develop into high cliffs. The cliff face below the hotel gives rise to the famous sulphurous spring after which the hotel is named and also a chalybeate spring and a petrifying seep.

Hadrian's Wall crossed the river on a bridge at Willowford, 0.75 kilometres (0.5 miles) east of Birdoswald Roman Fort. From that point the course of the river as it turns west is lined with other Roman sites associated with the Roman Stanegate road and Hadrian's Wall. A 914-metre (2,998.7 feet) stretch of Wall, including two turrets and the impressive bridge remains, runs alongside the River Irthing at Willowford, linked by a new footbridge to Birdoswald Roman Fort. This crossing of the River Irthing marked a significant transition in the construction of Hadrian's Wall, emphasising the greater availability of building stone to the east.

Passing Brampton the Irthing merges with the River Gelt, and soon after meets the River Eden near Warwick Bridge, just north of Wetheral.
