= Banna (Birdoswald) =

Former Roman fort in England

- Birdoswald Roman Fort
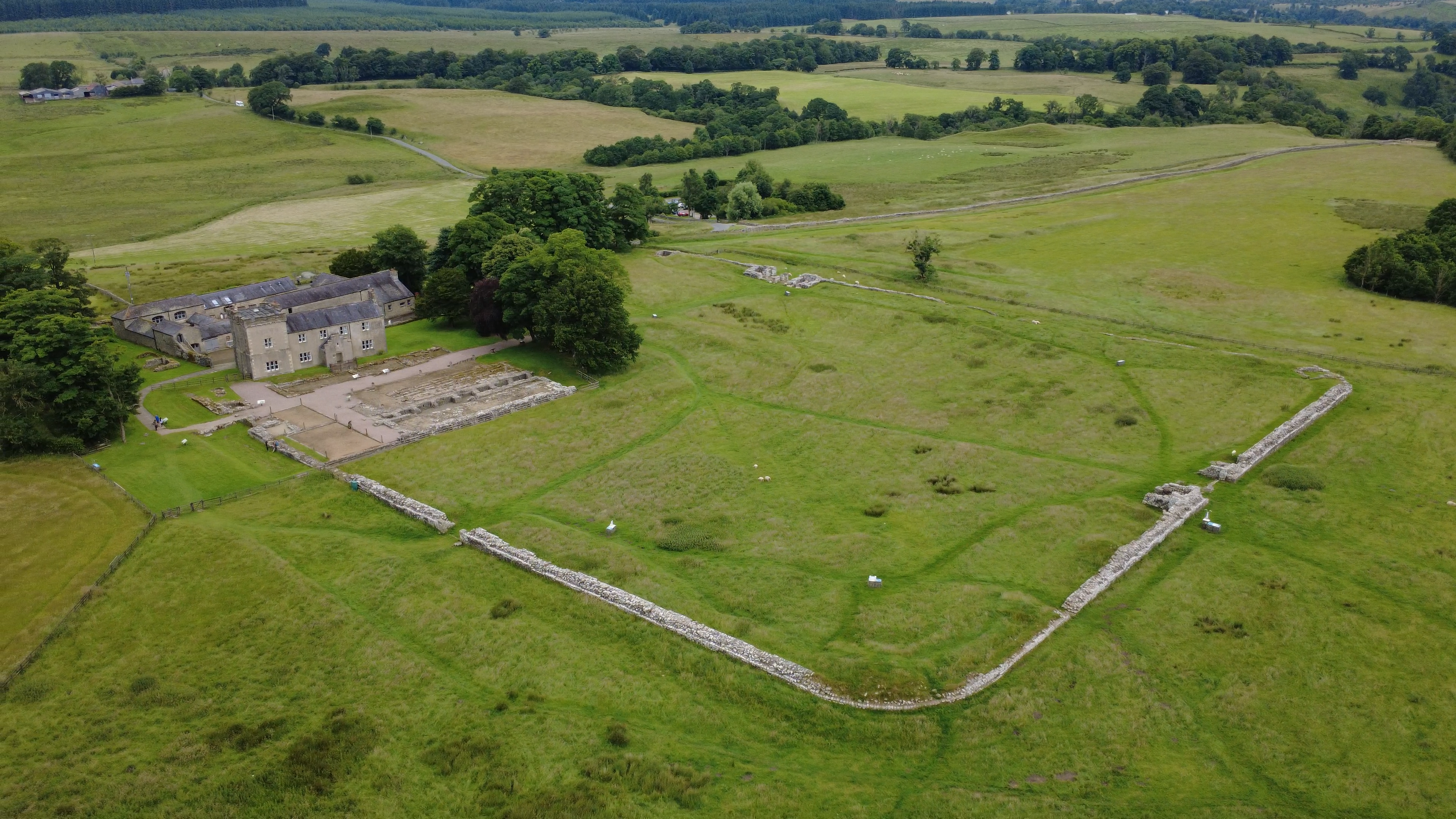

- Location within Cumbria
- 54.9894°N 2.6023°W
- Location: Cumbria, England

History
- Founded: c. 112 AD
- Abandoned: c. 500 AD

Site notes
- Website: Birdoswald Roman Fort

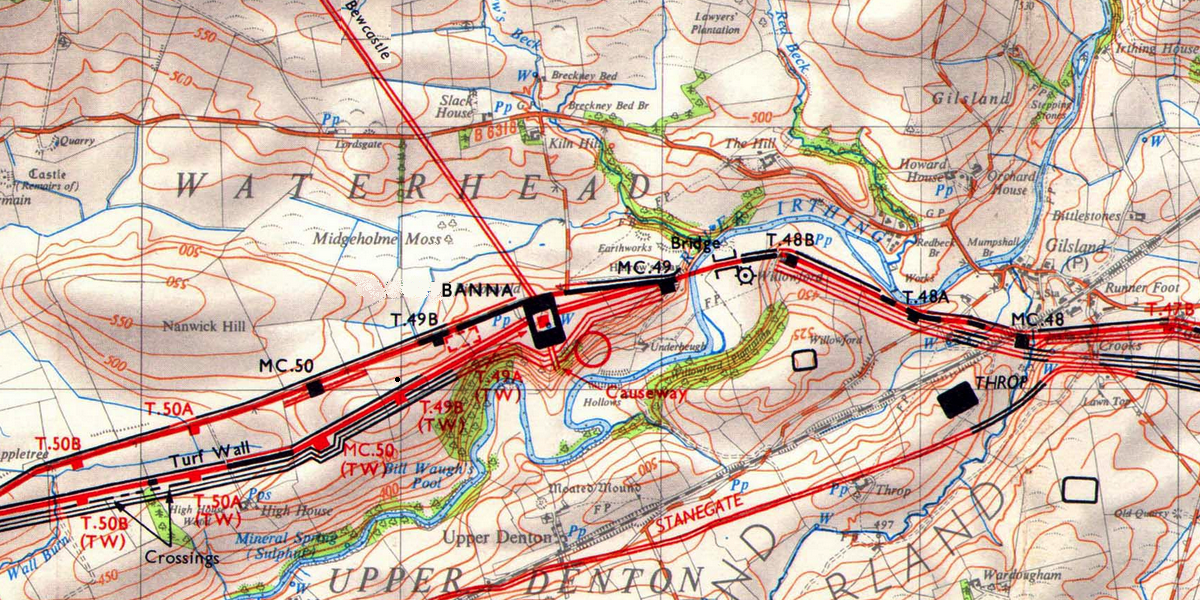
Banna on 1964 OS map

Birdoswald Roman Fort, known to the Romans as Banna, was one of the 16 forts on Hadrian's Wall. Built in the 2nd century AD, Banna, as a site, continued to be used well beyond Roman occupation. After a short period of desertion, the site was reoccupied around the 13th century and was used as a farm up until 1984.

Birdoswald lies towards the western end of Hadrian's Wall and is one of the best preserved forts along the wall. It is also attached to the longest surviving stretch of Hadrian's Wall. As of June 2023, over 200 students have worked on excavations at the site.

Cumbria County Council were responsible for the management of Birdoswald fort from 1984 until the end of 2004, when English Heritage assumed responsibility.

== Etymology ==
The Romans referred to the fort at Birdoswald as Banna, meaning 'peak' or 'horn' in Celtic, reflecting the geography of the site on a triangular spur of land bounded by cliffs to the South and East, commanding a broad meander of the River Irthing in Cumbria below.

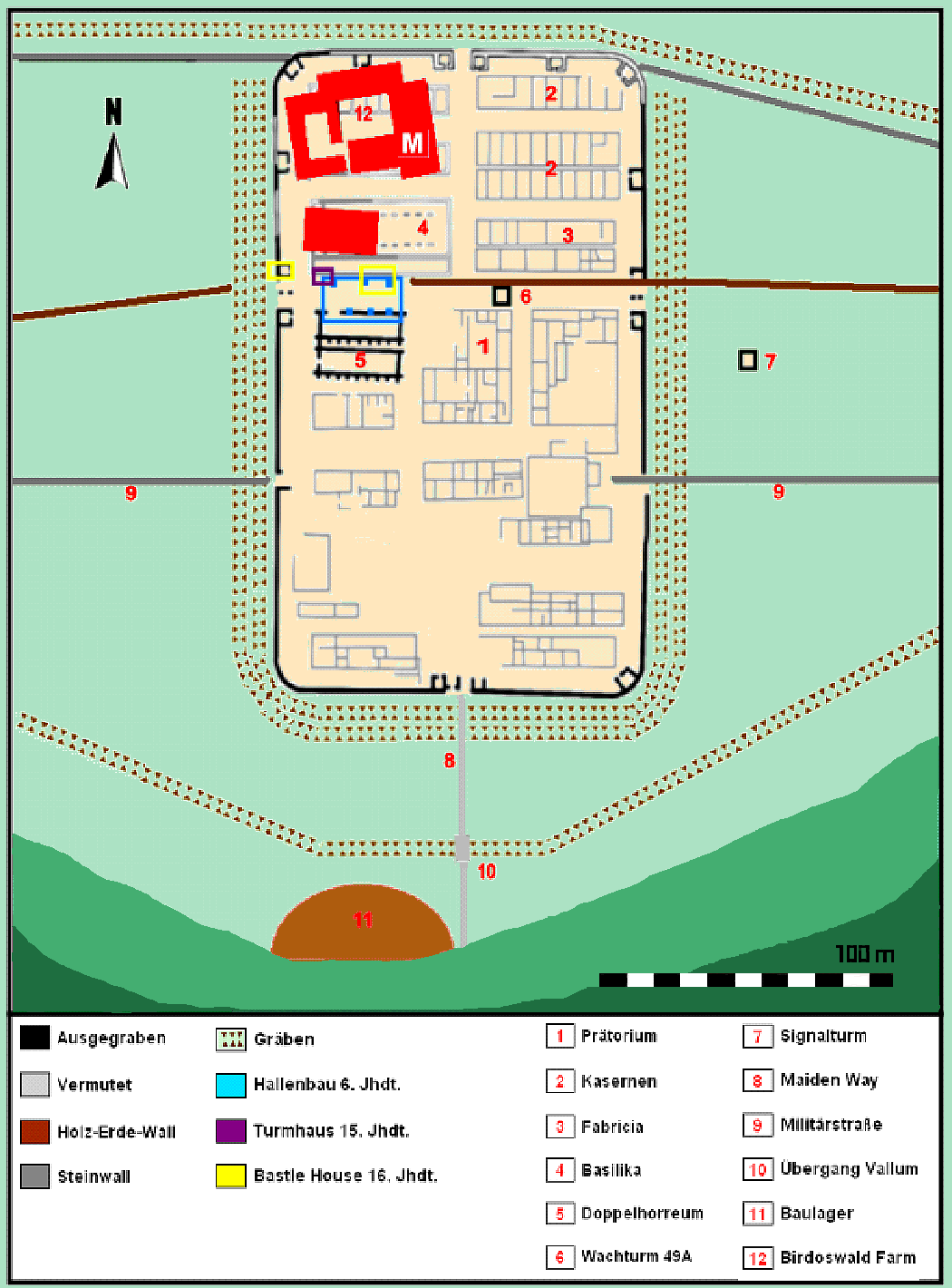
Plan of Birdoswald Fort

== History ==
Little evidence exists of pre-Roman occupation of the area; the land was too boggy or steep to farm so the area had remained uncleared of trees. A stone-lined pit, presumably a burial cist or grave, is the only evidence of activity at this time.

Just as the rest of Hadrian's Wall, the Western part on which Birdoswald now sits was probably originally built starting from 122 AD. The site was chosen for its strategic position, but that meant that, before any building could commence, the area had to be cleared of trees and the bog drained. Banna was intended to protect a crossing at the river Irthing, where a bridge had been constructed at roughly the same time as the wall. This section of the wall was originally built as a turf wall with free-standing stone turrets and a tented camp South of the later fort, possibly for legionary soldiers who were building the wall.

=== The Timber Fort ===
The first fort was built around 125 AD, but very little is known of this first fort. Evidence suggests that it was built of turf and timber, and possibly straddled the turf wall. Its size is uncertain. To the South of the fort was what's known as the Vallum, a vast earthwork running the length of the wall, passable only really by causeways leading to the South gate of each fort. Its purpose is also not certain.

=== The Stone Fort ===
The original timber fort was rebuilt in stone sometime around 130 AD, the walls built at this time are those still enclosing the site today. The new fort was built larger than the previous timber one, being 2.12 hectares, and also straddled the turf wall, with the North, East, and West gates all situated to the North of it. Minor East and West gates were situated South of the turf wall. The interior was filled with a complex, with all the trapping of a Roman fort: a small number of objects also suggesting that the garrison first stationed at Banna may have been a cavalry or, at least, a partly-mounted unit.

Sometime around 138 AD, the turf wall was rebuilt in stone at Banna, as well as five miles East and West. The new stone wall ran to the Northern corners of the fort, rendering the minor East and West gates redundant, so they were walled up. Interestingly, this stretch of the wall is the only part where the stone wall didn't exactly follow the path of the turf wall, meaning the remains of the turf wall's ditch can be seen prominently in the landscape.

Banna was abandoned for roughly 20 years as the Roman army was repositioned North to the Antonine Wall. However, this move was reversed soon after the death of Antionius Pius and Banna was reoccupied. It is not known whether it was reoccupied by the same garrison that had left 20 years previously. This may have been the time the Dacian unit came to Banna.

Large-scale military organisation may have ceased by the mid-fourth century considering the Northern granary was quarried for building materials, and the Southern granary was repurposed. Also around this time, funerary practices changed from cremation to burial, possibly the influence of Christianity on the area, however, no other evidence of Christian influence from this time has been found.

As the Western Roman Empire collapsed, the frontier troops on Hadrian's Wall seem to have been largely unaffected by troops movements. Post-Roman buildings at Banna show the garrison stationed there didn't move out after losing their connections and pay; the Southern granary was twice rebuilt as a hall.

== Layout ==
All the buildings inside Banna were either wholly stone-built, or were at least timber-frame buildings on low stone foundations. All of these buildings are known from geophysical survey and excavation.

=== Central Buildings ===
In the centre of the fort were built the central headquarters (principia), the commanding officer's house (praetorium), and a pair of large granaries (horrea): all located on the Southern side of the main road (via principalis) which linked the main East and West gates. The identities of these buildings can be confirmed as Roman auxiliary forts followed a standard layout.

==== Principia ====
This was the heart of the fort, where regiment affairs were sorted out and religion was practiced. The entrance from the via principalis opened into a courtyard surrounded by a veranda. Behind this was a roofed basilica, where the commanding officer carried out official business, and behind this were offices. The central office was the chapel (aedes) where the regiment's standards and images of the emperor were kept. The strongroom with the pay chest was also located here.

==== Praetorium ====
This was the commanding officer's house, located between the principia and the East gate.The praetorium was a Mediterranean-style courtyard house with a private bath, where the commanding officer would have spend his 3-4 ear term with his wife, children, servants, and slaves.

=== Other Buildings ===
On the North side of the main street were two buildings dating from the earliest period of the fort's history. Firstly, a set of workshops (fabricae) have been identified, having been converted from storehouses. Behind this area was a drill hall (basilica exercitatoria) with a double arcade and high windows. This drill hall was important at Banna as it allowed training no matter the weather conditions. The importance of the drill hall seems to have continued throughout the period of Roman occupation at the fort, as it wasn't changed at all during this time.

South of the main street were two granaries (horrea), possibly built around 205-8 AD. These granaries stood around two storeys high, and were the main food store for the soldiers stationed at Banna. A soldier's staple diet consisted of grain- based foods like bread and porridge, as well as meat such as beef, pork, mutton, poultry, and venison. the granaries also stored wheat and barley, possibly for brewing beer. The granaries had air vents in the floor and walls to keep food fresh. At some point after 353 AD, the North granary roof collapsed. No effort was made to clear the rubble, except for reusing the material in other places. The South granary was the adapted around the same time or later, and converted into a hall. The site of the North granary was cleared and another building was built there some time around 395 AD.

The area South of the via principalis to the Southern gate was a lower area, meaning all buildings in this section needed to be terraced up. This ditch is now filled with debris which contributed to preserving the foundations of these buildings.

South of the main buildings was another East-West road that linked the two minor gates (via quintana), used even after the gates were blocked off. South of this road was largely used for barracks, but there is the possibility that this area also included workshops and a hospital (valetudinarium).

=== Walls and Gates ===
Banna followed the standard layout for Roman forts. It had 4 double gates on each side, each of which had broad stone arched entrances which could accommodate wheeled carts. Each gateway was flanked by two guard towers. The fort wall also had occasional smaller watchtowers, probably similar in design to the main gate towers. It is probable that the wall of the fort had a walkway around it, meaning these towers likely joined onto it with a second storey.

==== Wall ====
The wall of the fort shows different building styles, evidencing the repair and rebuilding efforts that took place over the fort's life. In 1992, the South-East section of collapsed wall was excavated; these excavations revealed a third century rebuild of the wall with no crenellations or walkway, and a height of 3.6 meters. When first constructed, the wall was almost certainly taller, and probably had a walkway. This section of wall also has large blocks built into it, probably reused parts of the nearby bridge at Willowford which was rebuilt during the 2nd century.

==== North Gate ====
No trace of the North gate can be seen today. The stones in the North-West corner have been robbed, leaving a sole-standing watchtower. This tower had been repurposed as a bakehouse, before being blocked off during the 3rd century. Further along the North wall from here was another tower, which had also been converted into a bakehouse.

==== South Gate ====
The South gate (porta decumana) was excavated in 1852, found to be identical in plan to the main East gate but far less well preserved. Both entrances were blocked during the 3rd century and ovens installed.

==== Main East Gate ====
Excavated in 1852, the main East gate (porta principalis dextra) is the best preserved gate on Hadrian's Wall. At some point during the 3rd century, the Northern side of this gate was walled up; an inscription found during the 1850s states that rebuilding and repair work took place here in 219 AD.

==== Main West Gate ====
The main West gate (porta principalis sinistra) would have been identical to the main East gate. The South tower of this gate shows perhaps the most impressive masonry on Hadrian's wall, leading historians to believe this section was part of the 3rd century rebuild of the gate, with the stone coming from elsewhere in the fort: perhaps an imperial monument like the base of a statue. The middle 3rd century saw the Southern entrance blocked with coarse stone; it was possibly around this time that the rooms at the base of the towers were repurposed into iron-working areas. In the 4th century, a footbridge crossing the ditch outside was connected to the Northern entrance. Medieval pottery was found under the collapsed stonework. The main West gate survived as the main entrance to the site until the 14th century.

==== Minor Gates ====
Further South in the fort from the main East and West gates are the minor East and West gates (porta quintana dextra/sinistra), simple gateways straddled by a tower which were blocked off early in the fort's history and remained a constant structural weakness.

==== Vicus ====
Geophysical surveys detected a civilian presence of different characters on the Eastern, Western and Northern sides of the fort. This was known as the vicus; it was administered by the fort commander and provided goods and services for the garrison, as well as housing the soldier's unofficial families, since marriages weren't recognised until a soldier was discharged, and had probably existed since the beginnings of Hadrian's Wall. Little evidence exists of the lives of women and children at Banna, but their presence can be seen from a pair of children's shoes and golden earrings, which were probably worn by women.

===== The Bathhouse and Other Buildings =====
The East of the fort contains evidence of stone buildings, two of which have been excavated. The first was probably a tavern, and sat on the main road out of the East gate. The other was a bath house, located in the valley of the River Irthing. First alluded to during excavations in 1931, its identity as a bathhouse was only made obvious in the Summer of 2022, when under-floor heating and other indications were discovered. In the Summer of 2023, the site was covered over again in order to preserve it, as keeping it open would have costed millions. These excavations led to discoveries on how the inhabitants at Banna attained and used water. The site was built on a bog which needed constant drainage: the bathhouse's stoking room shows evidence of a meter-deep ground water drain to prevent flooding. The bathhouse itself seems to have been fed by an aqueduct running from a source North of the fort, through Hadrian's Wall itself, and into the bathhouse through wooden pipes. A fire fueled the boiler for hot water, and also sent hot air through an under-floor heating system, or hypocaust.

To the North of the fort, along a road that led to an outpost at Bewcastle, evidence for domestic and industrial activity, as well as clay foundations for timber buildings was discovered: and to the West, the site of a possible marketplace has been identified.

===== The Cemetery =====
On high ground to the West of the vicus was a cemetery; excavations in 2009 revealing the remains of 61 cremated individuals. Burial rituals typical of the area of modern Poland have been identified here, as well as Mediterranean figs and dates. Tombstones identify the burials of a North African legionary, and an infant son of one of the fort commanders.

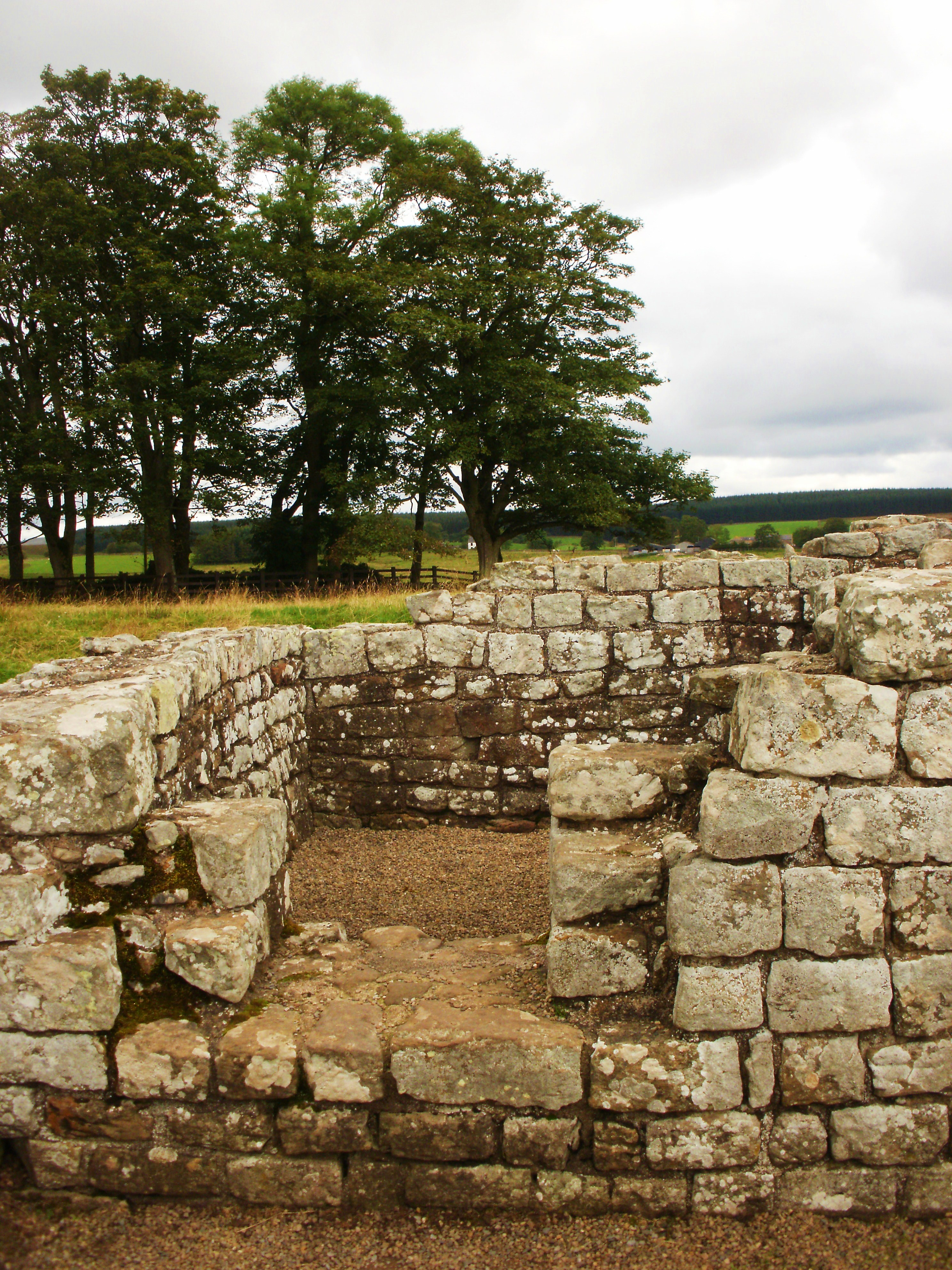
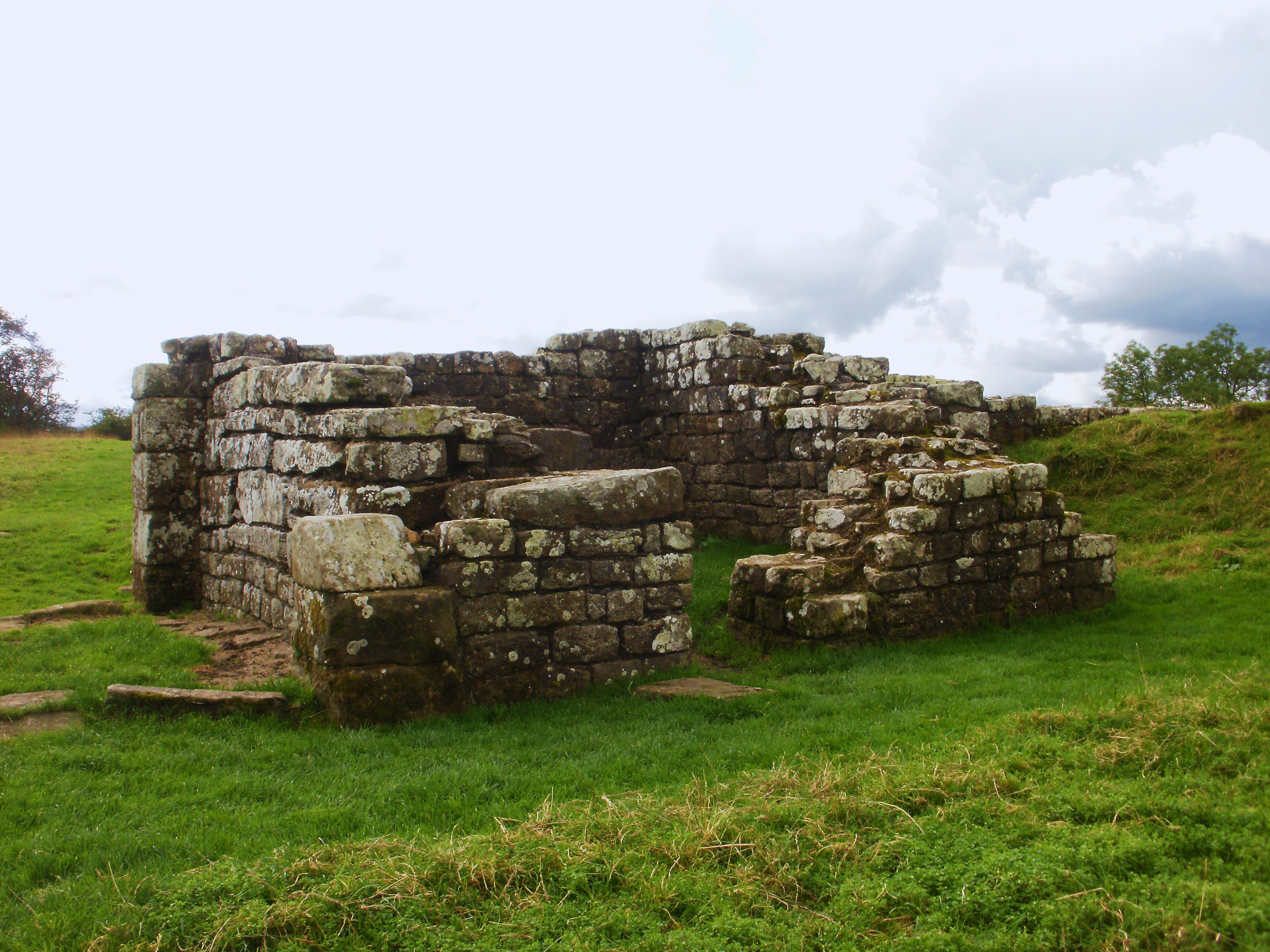
The archaeological remnants of the east gate (left) and south gate (right) of the Roman Fort enclosure.

== Other remains ==
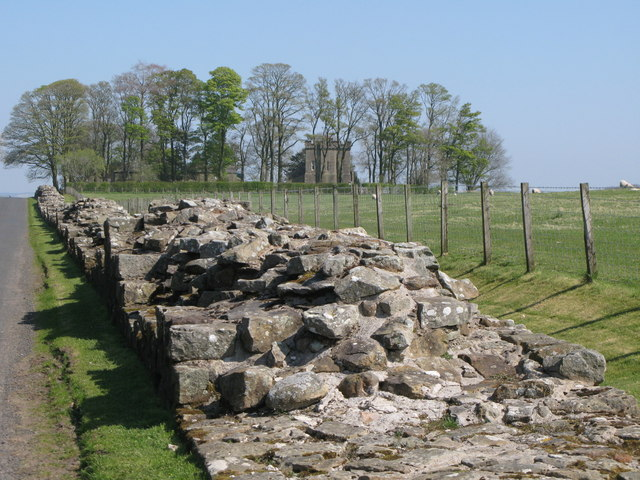
Hadrian's Wall west of Birdoswald

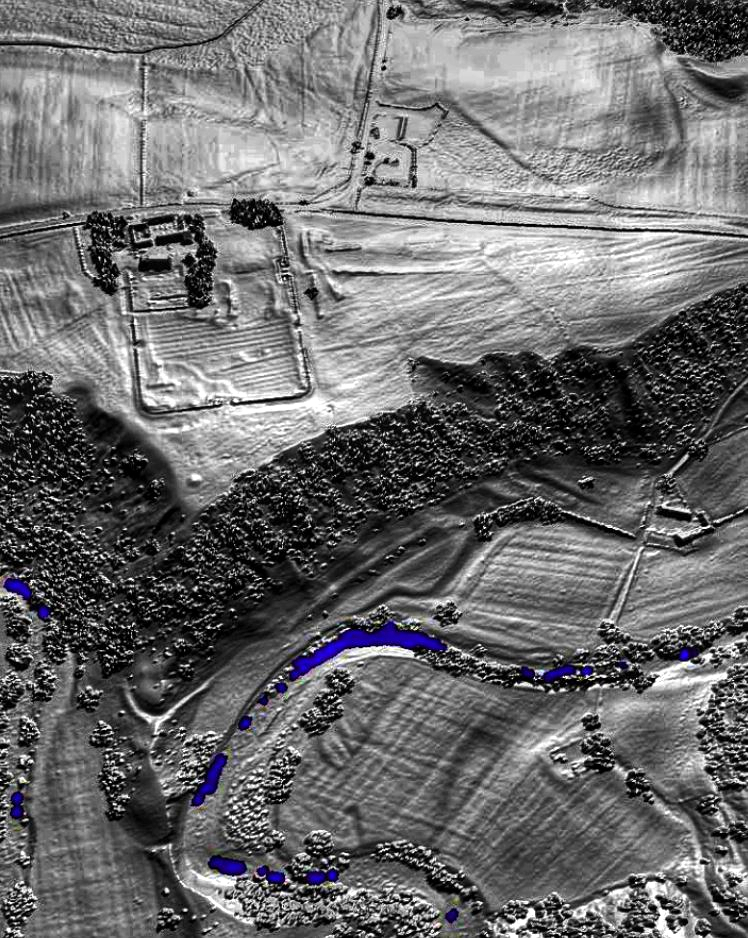
A lidar view of Birdoswald (Banna) Roman fort on Hadrian's Wall

To the south of Banna lies what is known as the Stanegate, a Roman frontier road built by Hadrian's predecessor, Trajan. This road connected Nether Denton fort, Mains Rigg signal tower, and Throp fortlet. These forts housed troops to defend the Roman frontier before Hadrian's wall was built, and give early warning of attack.

To the East of Banna, a bridge over the river Irthing at Willowford connected the originally turf-built section of Hadrian's Wall to the stone section. The Eastern abutment of this bridge is still visible.

Two temporary camps, Crooks and Willowford, may have been used to house legionaries who constructed Hadrian's Wall, but, as of 2025, they are yet to be precisely dated.

Hadrian's Wall had small outposts every mile, called milecastles, with two turrets between each. These outposts would have housed soldiers who patrolled the walls. A stretch of wall East of Banna is the only place where there are the remains of two milecastles with turrets between them.

== History of excavations ==
The fort has been extensively excavated for over a century, with twentieth century excavations starting in 1911 by F.G. Simpson and continuing with Ian Richmond from 1927 to 1933. The gateways and walls were then re-excavated under the supervision of Brenda Swinbank and J P Gillam from 1949 to 1950.

Extensive geophysical surveys, both magnetometry and earth resistance survey, were conducted by TimeScape Surveys (Alan Biggins and David Taylor, 1999 and 2004) between 1997 and 2001. These surveys established that the sub-surface remains in the fort were well preserved.

An area between the fort and the escarpment was excavated by the Channel 4 archaeological television programme Time Team in January 2000, which detected signs of an extramural settlement (vicus), but the area is liable to erosion and the majority of the vicus could have fallen over the cliffs.

In 2021, Newcastle University, Historic England, and English Heritage launched a major new archaeological excavation at the site.

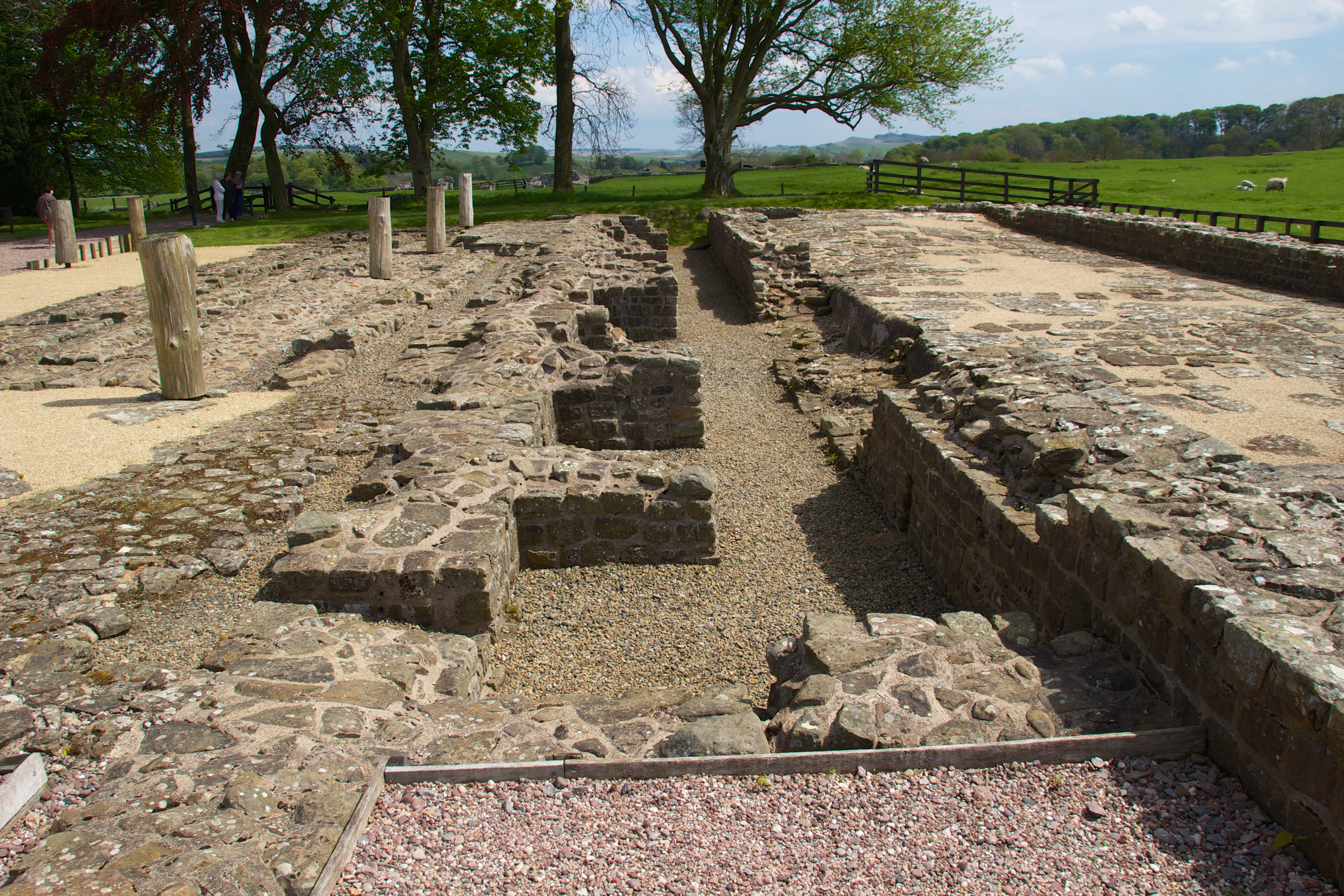
A granary wall at Birdoswald Fort

== Birdoswald Roman Fort today ==
Today the fort's site is operated by English Heritage as Birdoswald Roman Fort. The visitor centre features displays and reconstructions of the fort, exhibits about life in Roman Britain, the site's history through the ages, and archaeological discoveries in the 19th and 20th centuries. Visitors can walk outside along the excavated remains of the fort.
