= Skitby =

Hamlet in Cumbria, England

Coordinates: 54.983°N 2.862°W

- Location in the former Carlisle district, Cumbria Location within Cumbria
- OS grid reference: NY448657
- Civil parish: Kirklinton Middle
- Unitary authority: Cumberland
- Ceremonial county: Cumbria
- Region: North West
- Country: England
- Sovereign state: United Kingdom
- Post town: CARLISLE
- Postcode district: CA6
- Dialling code: 01228
- Police: Cumbria
- Fire: Cumbria
- Ambulance: North West
- UK Parliament: Carlisle

Skitby is a hamlet in the English county of Cumbria.

Skitby lies northeast of the village of Smithfield.
