= Shanghai Post =

Shanghai Post can refer to:

- The Shanghai Post, a German-language newspaper
- Shanghai Evening Post & Mercury, an American-owned English-language newspaper published in Shanghai.
- Shanghai's postal administration
