= Kirklinton =

Village in Cumbria, England

Coordinates: 54.993°N 2.883°W

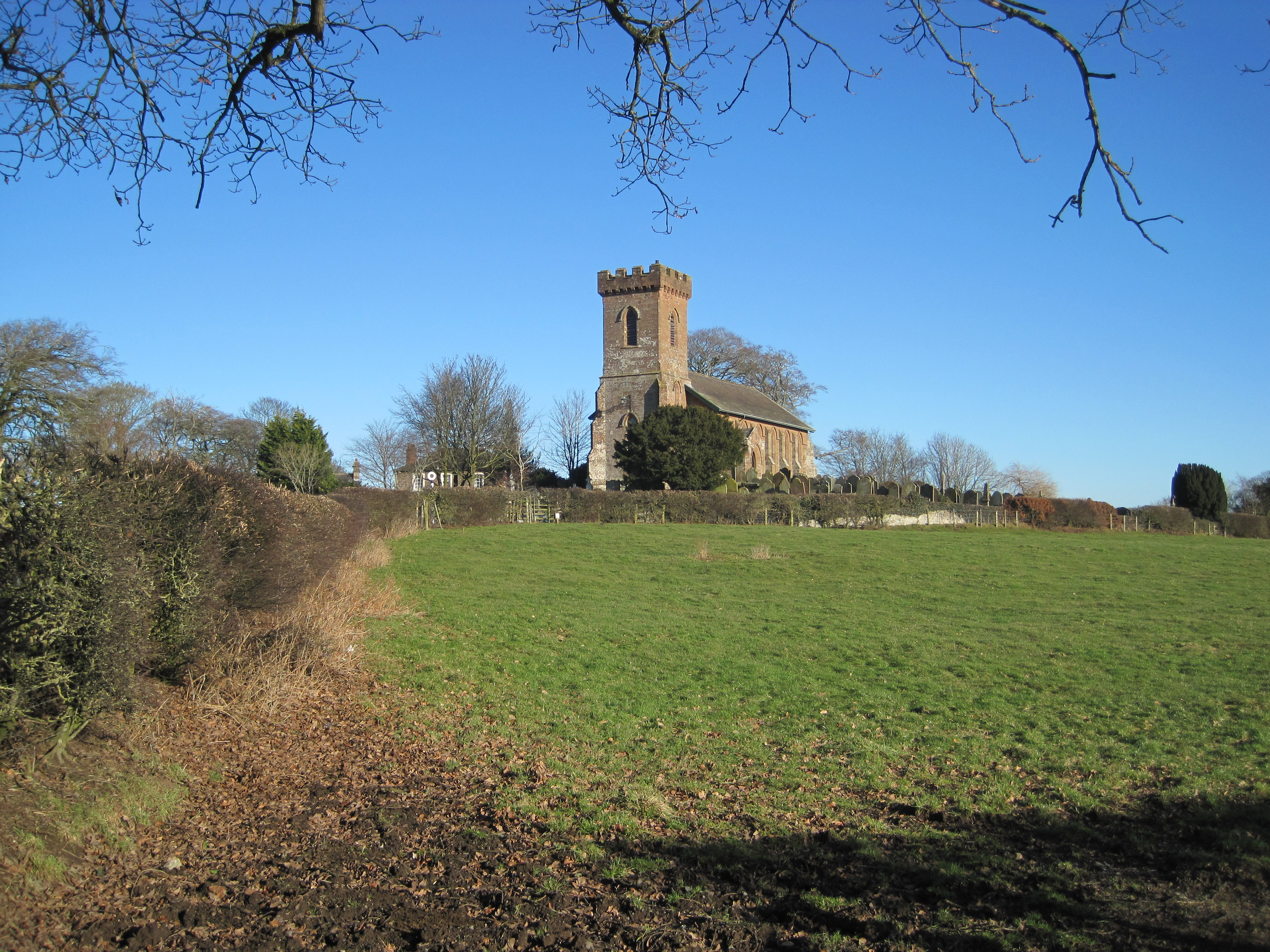
- St. Cuthbert's Church, Kirklinton

- Location in the former Carlisle district, Cumbria Location within Cumbria
- Population: 384 (2011)
- OS grid reference: NY435668
- Civil parish: Kirklinton Middle
- Unitary authority: Cumberland
- Ceremonial county: Cumbria
- Region: North West
- Country: England
- Sovereign state: United Kingdom
- Post town: CARLISLE
- Postcode district: CA6
- Dialling code: 01228
- Police: Cumbria
- Fire: Cumbria
- Ambulance: North West
- UK Parliament: Carlisle

Kirklinton is a village in the Cumberland district, in the English county of Cumbria. The population of the civil parish of Kirklinton Middle, taken at the 2011 census was 384. It is a few miles away from the small town of Longtown. It has a church called St Cuthbert's Church. The parish of Kirklinton Middle contains the village of Smithfield.

The village lies near the boundary between the civil parishes of Kirklinton Middle and Hethersgill, so that while the church is in the former the adjacent vicarage is in the latter.

Two miles north of the village, Brackenhill Tower is a restored pele tower, built in 1584 and little altered externally.

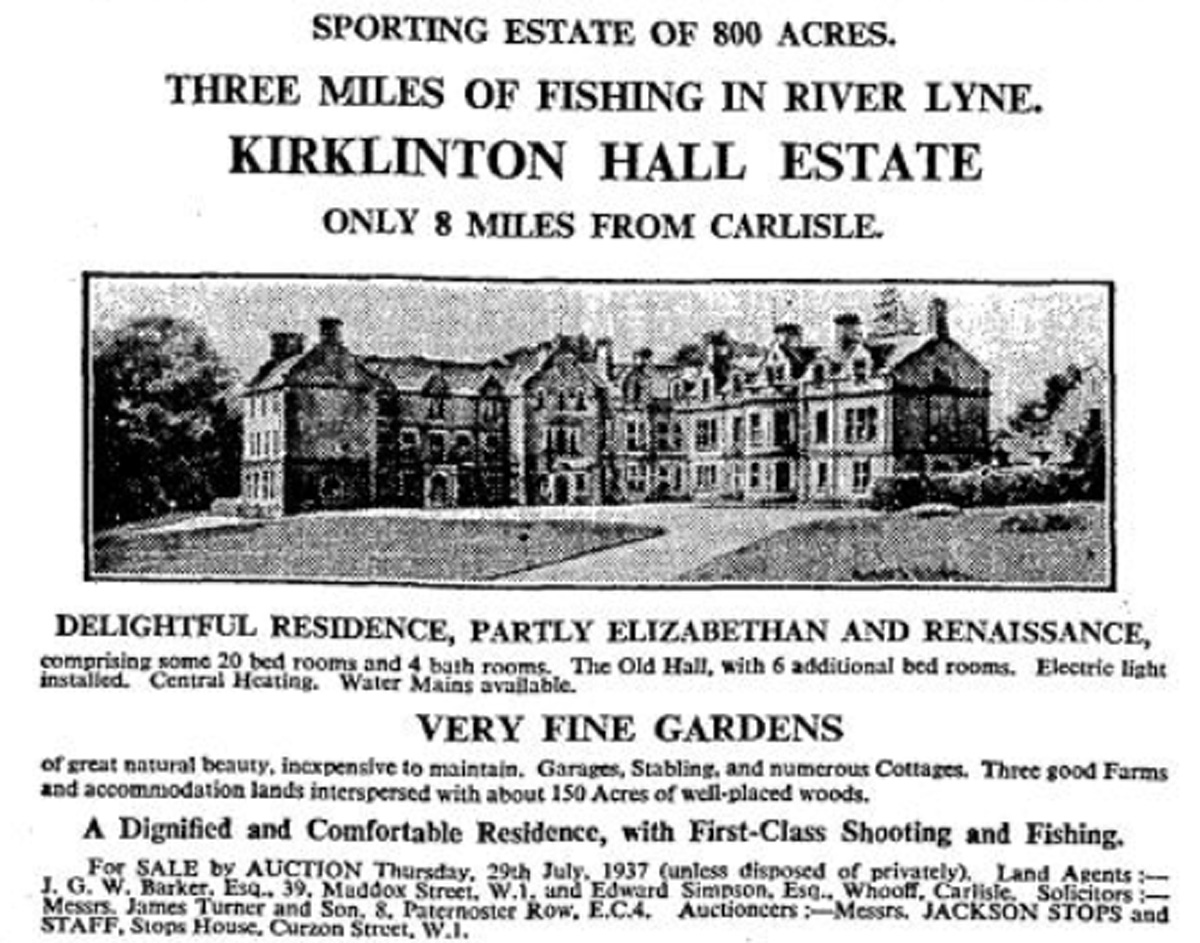
Advertisement for Kirklinton Hall, 1937.

The Grade II listed Kirklinton Hall outside the village has been a ruin which lay derelict for 40 years. The hall was purchased by the Palmer family in 2022 and is being lovingly restored An advertisement for the hall before its decay is shown on the left.

== See also ==
- Listed buildings in Hethersgill
- Listed buildings in Kirklinton Middle
