= Shanghai Jewish Chronicle =

German Jewish newspaper in Shanghai (1939–1948)

- Type: daily newspaper weekly newspaper (later)
- Founded: May 3, 1939
- Ceased publication: 1948
- Language: German
- Headquarters: Shanghai
- Country: China

Shanghai Jewish Chronicle
- Traditional Chinese: 上海猶太紀事報
- Simplified Chinese: 上海犹太纪事报
Transcriptions
Standard Mandarin
- Hanyu Pinyin: Shànghǎi Yóutài Jìshìbào

The Shanghai Jewish Chronicle (Chinese: 上海猶太紀事報) was a Jewish newspaper operating in Shanghai, China. It was a German language newspaper that was originally published daily and later published weekly.

The paper opened on May 3, 1939. The German language newspaper business was increasing in Shanghai due to an influx of Jewish refugees from Europe. Ossi Lewin, J. Kastan, and Horwitz served as the editors. The newspaper stories included international news and often referred to interests held by Jewish people. It targeted "Jews of the Far East and especially those of the German speaking community." It also discussed emigration problems. Each issue had eight to sixteen pages. Advertising made up about one third of each issue.

After the Japanese took over China, the Chronicle cooperated with the Japanese administration. It was the only Jewish newspaper in Shanghai to exist after World War II. In 1945 it was renamed Shanghai Echo. In 1948 publication ended.

== See also ==
- Der Ostasiatische Lloyd
- Deutsche Shanghai Zeitung
- Shen Bao
- North China Daily News
- Shanghai Evening Post and Mercury
- Tsingtauer Neueste Nachrichten
