= Listed buildings in Hethersgill =

Hethersgill is a civil parish in the Cumberland district of Cumbria, England. It contains 17 listed buildings that are recorded in the National Heritage List for England. All the listed buildings are designated at Grade II, the lowest of the three grades, which is applied to "buildings of national importance and special interest". The parish contains the villages of Hethersgill and Kirklinton, and is otherwise rural. Most of the listed buildings are houses and associated structures, farmhouses and farm buildings. The other listed buildings include relocated columns from a demolished church, a former Friends' meeting house, a war memorial, and a church hall.

== Buildings ==
| Name and location | Photograph | Date | Notes |
|---|---|---|---|
| Garden columns, Kirklinton Vicarage; 54.99484°N 2.88829°W | | 12th century | The columns originated as piers in the original St Cuthbert's Church, they were moved in 1845 when the church was rebuilt, and used as a garden feature. They consist of round sandstone columns with carved capitals and incised decoration. |
| Kirklinton Hall; 54.99803°N 2.88402°W | | c. 1661 (possible | A country house that was extended in 1875 by Cory and Ferguson, but is now in ruins. It is in calciferous sandstone and, where the roof remains, it is in Welsh slate. The house has two and three storeys, numerous bays, and a roughly E-shaped plan. The main entrance has a round head and twin Doric columns on a plinth. The windows in the ground and middle floors of the main part are sashes and have architraves and entablatures with pulvinated friezes. In the top floor the windows are square casements with similar entablatures and friezes. Above are with shaped gables and a modillion eaves cornice. |
| Anguswell; 54.98596°N 2.82679°W | — | Late 17th century | A farmhouse built in large sandstone blocks, that has a Welsh slate roof with coped gables. There are two storeys, three bays, a single-storey one-bay extension to the left, and a single-story outshut at the rear. The doorway and the 20th-century sash windows have chamfered surrounds. In the extension is a casement window. |
| Rigghead; 54.99323°N 2.86980°W | | 1698 | A rendered farmhouse with stone dressings and a Welsh slate roof. There are two storeys and three bays, with a single-bay extension on the left. The doorway has a chamfered surround and a moulded and dated lintel. The windows are sashes, those in the upper floor having chamfered surrounds. There is also a fire window with a chamfered surround and moulded cornice. |
| Sikeside; 54.99027°N 2.86752°W | — | 1699 | A rendered farmhouse with a slate roof, in two storeys and three bays. The doorway has a chamfered surround, and the windows are sashes. To the right is a single-storey two-bay extension with a Welsh slate roof, a casement window and a sash window. |
| Friends' Meeting House; 54.98998°N 2.86703°W | — | 1736 | The former Friends' meeting house was later used as a barn, and then as a dwelling. It is in sandstone with a shaped cornice, and a slate roof with coped gables. There is one storey and three bays. The doorway has a round head, projecting impost blocks, and a keystone. The windows are sashes with round heads, stone surrounds, and projecting keystones. |
| Dovecote, Anguswell; 54.98599°N 2.82630°W | — | Mid 18th century | The dovecote is in sandstone with quoins, it has a slate roof, and is in two storeys. The doorway has a chamfered surround, and above it is a re-used carved coat of arms dated 1599. Inside there is a 19th-century two-seater dry closet, and in the upper floor are stone boulins. |
| The Croft; 54.99607°N 2.81857°W | — | Late 18th century | A sandstone house with quoins and a tile roof. There are two storeys and three bays, sash windows, and a door with a fanlight, all in plain stone surrounds. |
| Riggfoot House; 54.99705°N 2.83339°W | — | 1821 | A stuccoed farmhouse with chamfered quoins and a slate roof. The round-headed doorway has a chamfered quoined surround and a patterned fanlight, and the sash windows have stone surrounds. There is a projecting canted bay window to the left, and a single-storey extension to the right with a casement window. |
| Kirklinton Park; 54.99061°N 2.86059°W | — | 1822 | A country house in sandstone on a chamfered plinth, with quoins, a moulded cornice and blocking course, and a hipped slate roof. There are 2 1/2 storeys and five bays. The doorway has a pilaster strip surround, a cornice on consoles, a fanlight and side lights. The windows are sashes with moulded surrounds. In the roof is a large hipped dormer flanked by smaller dormers, all containing casement windows. |
| Gate piers and wall, Kirklinton Park; 54.99207°N 2.85727°W | — | Early 19th century | The gate piers and walls are in calciferous sandstone. The piers are square and each has a moulded cornice and a ball finial on a console bracket. Between each pair of piers is a serpentine shaped wall with moulded coping. |
| Quarrybrow; 54.98840°N 2.83393°W | — | Early 19th century | A house in rendered sandstone with a Welsh slate roof. There are two storeys and two bays. The doorway has a fanlight, a sandstone surround, and a cornice, and the windows are sashes with sandstone surrounds. |
| Kirkinton Vicarage and stables 54.99499°N 2.88815°W | — | 1839 | The vicarage is in sandstone with angle pilaster strips and a hipped slate roof. There are two storeys and three bays, a wooden gabled porch, a doorway with a patterned fanlight, and sash windows with plain surrounds. The stables at the rear are dated 1903, they are in sandstone with quoins and a roof of Welsh slate and some sandstone. The stables contain a round-arched cart entrance, mullioned windows with casements, a loft door, a shaped gable, and ventilation slits, and at the rear is a gabled dormer. |
| Church Hall; 54.99519°N 2.88823°W | — | 1840 | Originally a Sunday School, the hall is in sandstone on a chamfered plinth, with quoins and a slate roof. It has one storey and two bays. The doorway has a pointed arch and a chamfered surround, and above it is a date stone. The windows are mullioned with two lights, they have round heads and hood moulds. |
| Barn, Kirklinton Hall; 54.99841°N 2.88391°W | — | 1875 (probable) | The barn is in sandstone with a Welsh slate roof. It has two storeys and an L-shaped plan. There are plank doors, boarded windows, and a shaped gable end. |
| Kirklington Park Lodge; 54.99194°N 2.85716°W | | c. 1900 | The lodge is in rendered sandstone on a plinth with a Welsh slate roof, and has one storey with an attic. It has an almost square plan with polygonal bay windows in three corners. In the roof is a slate-hung dormer containing a two-light casement window on each side. The windows in the ground floor are sashes in moulded surrounds. The doorway has a segmental-arched fanlight with chamfered imposts. |
| War memorial 54.99572°N 2.81696°W | | 1920 | The war memorial is in the churchyard of St Mary's Church. It is in Aberdeen granite, and consists of a wheel-head cross on a tapering shaft. The shaft is on a tapering plinth with a moulded foot. The cross has a central boss, and there is Celtic knotwork carving on the arms of the cross and the front of the shaft. On the plinth is an inscription and the names of those lost in the two World Wars. |
