= Nichol Latimer =

British publisher of the North China Herald

- Born: 1830; England
- Died: 28 September 1865 (aged 34–35); Shanghai
- Education: Leeds Grammar School
- Occupations: Merchant, Shipbroker, Publisher
- Known for: Publisher of The North China Herald
- Relatives: Clement Moody, Vicar of Newcastle (maternal uncle); Mary Latimer R. R. C. (d. 1936) wife of Colonel Richard Stanley Hawks Moody CB (niece)

Nichol Latimer (1830 – 28 September 1865) a British businessman who was the publisher of The North China Herald, which was the most influential newspaper in treaty port China.

== Family ==
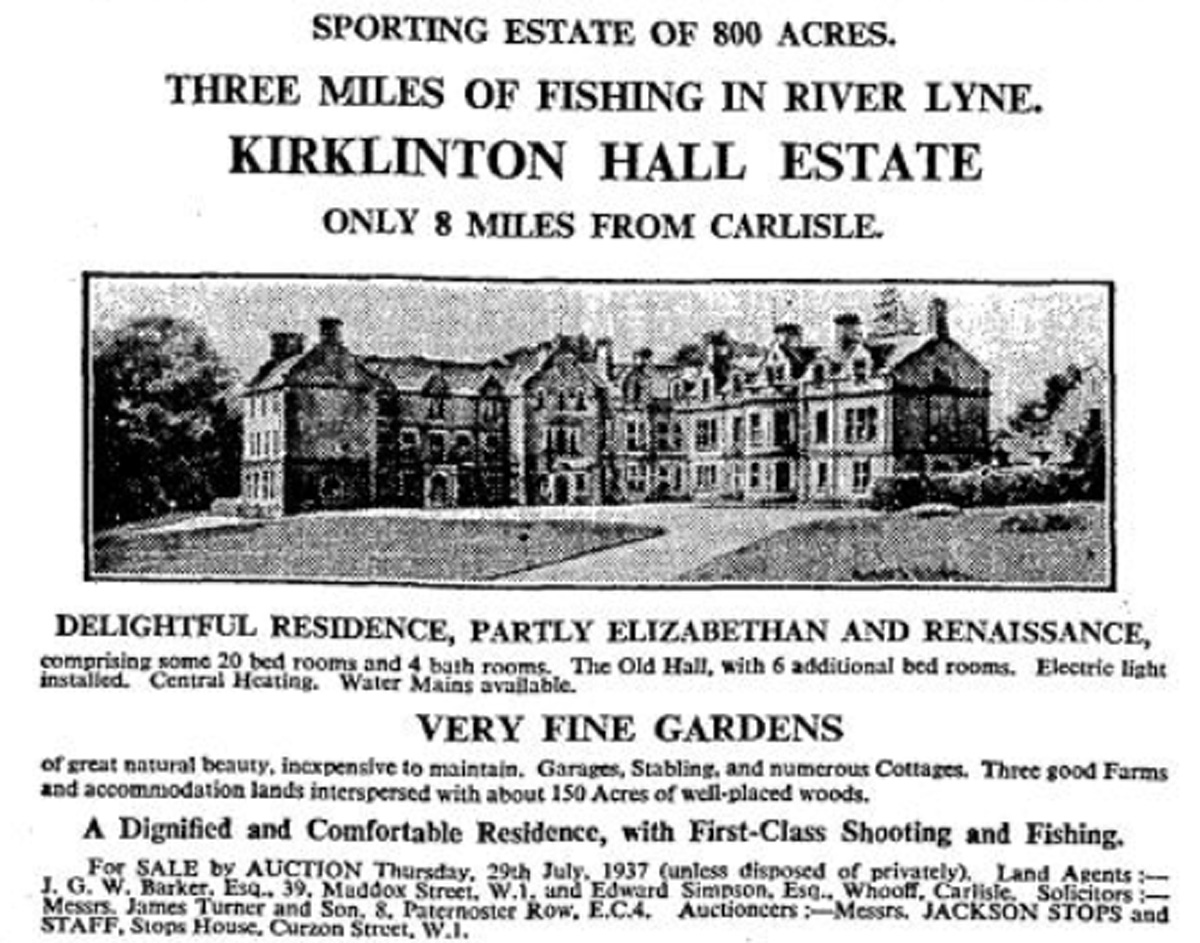
Nichol Latimer's father David was the owner of Kirklinton Hall

His father was the farmer David Latimer (b. 1781) of Berwickstown, Kirklinton, and later of Kirklinton Hall, and later of Leeds. His maternal uncle was the Oxford and Headington vintner Edward Latimer (1775 - 1845), whose wine is described as ‘Latimer’s immortal tun’ in the Oxford University poem 'Brasenose Ale', and who was vintner to The Duke of Marlborough. There is a memorial plaque to Edward Latimer and his wife Elizabeth (d. 1843) at St. Andrew's Church, Headington, where they and several other members of their family are buried. They had twelve children who survived into adulthood.

Nichol Latimer's mother was Anne Moody, who was the daughter of the surgeon George Moody (1773–1844), of Arthuret, Longtown, Cumbria, and later of Leeds. Anne Moody was a ladies' school founder, of Warwick Place, Leeds. His maternal uncle was the high church clergyman, theologian, classical scholar, and freemason, Clement Moody, Vicar of Newcastle.

His niece Mary Latimer R. R. C. (d. 1936), who was the daughter of the solicitor John Latimer (b. 1827, Kirklinton Hall, d. aged 54 years), of Horsfall and Latimer Solicitors, Park Row, and of St. Mark's Villas, Leeds, married his granduncle Colonel Thomas Moody ADC Kt.'s grandson Colonel Richard Stanley Hawks Moody CB.

His nephew Hugh Graham Latimer (b. 1863) was articled to his father as a solicitor, served as a Lieutenant in 3rd Battalion West Yorkshire Regiment, and inherited his father's farming, before emigrating to Almyra, Arkansas, by 1904.

== Career ==
He was educated at Leeds Grammar School with his younger brother Thomas and his nephew Hugh Graham Latimer.

He worked for the merchants Smith, Kennedy & Co. before he founded his own trading company, Nichol Latimer & Co (which was later renamed Latimer, Little, & Co.), at Foochow Road Shanghai in 1864. Partners in his company included Archibald Little, J. Nutt, and J. B. Tootal. He also was the manager of the Shanghai Steam Navigation Co. of Russell & Company, which was the largest American trading company during Quing dynasty China, until his death.

He was the publisher of The North China Herald which was the most influential newspaper in China.

He was a member of the Royal Asiatic Society China.

He died on 28 September 1865, from an overdose of morphine, and is buried at Shantung Road Cemetery, Shanghai, where his grave ID No. is 1064.
