= DSZ =

DSZ may refer to:

- Armed Forces Delegation for Poland (Delegatura Sił Zbrojnych na Kraj), a Polish anticommunist resistance organization formed 1945
- Deutsche Shanghai Zeitung, a German-language newspaper published in Shanghai, China, associated with the Nazi Party
- Deutsche Soldaten Zeitung, an extreme right German newspaper (1951–1963)
- Women's Democratic Party (Croatian: Demokratska stranka žena, DSŽ), a women's rights political organization founded in Zagreb in 2004
- Democratic Party of Greens (Demokratická strana zelených, DSZ), Czech political party
