= Kirklinton Hall =

Country House in England

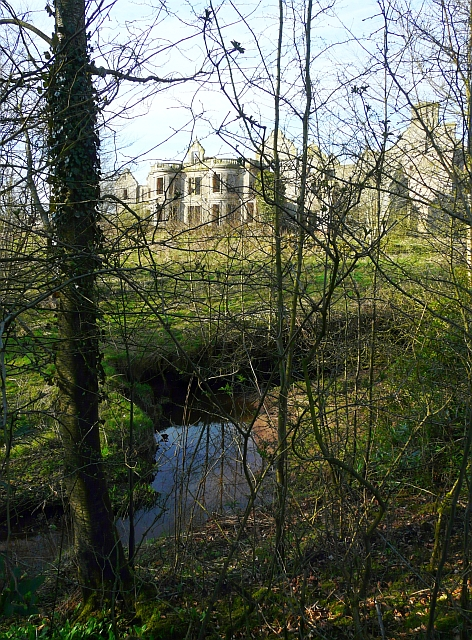
- Shell of Kirklinton Hall seen through trees

- Location within Cumbria
- Former names: Clough Hall Kirklevington Hall

General information
- Location: Kirklinton, Cumbria, England, Carlisle, CA6 6BB
- Coordinates: 54.998196°N 2.884075°W
- Ordnance Survey: NY4354167426

Website
- https://kirklintonhallandgardens.com/

Kirklinton Hall is a country house ruin at Kirklinton in the parish of Hethersgill, Cumbria, England. Parts of the building originate from the 17th century with significant additions being made in the 19th century. The building is listed (entry number 1335577) on the National Heritage List for England. There is an associated listing (entry number 1087610) for the Coach House, which sits slightly to the north of the main building.

The buildings, which are in various states of reconstruction and renovation, are currently being used for holiday accommodation and as a wedding venue.

The hall, or previous buildings on the same site, have previously been known as Clough Hall and Kirklevington Hall.

== History ==
=== Background ===
Circa 1100, the Barony of Levington was created by William II, son of William the Conqueror. The area covered by the barony approximates to the districts known as Kirklinton, Scaleby, Skelton, Orton. Sir Richard De Boyville was created the first Baron and took the surname of De Levington.

Sir Richard raised a castle, probably initially in wood and eventually in stone, on a mound by the River Lyne. The castle is no longer in existence, but the site is marked on Ordnance Survey maps, between the Stubb Farm and the river. Sir Richard also built a church – the Norman Chancel arch still being visible in the present church (St Cuthbert's).

The De Boyvilles remained barons of Levington for approximately 150 years – on the death of Richard, grandson of Richard the first Baron, the estate passed to his brother, Ranulph. Ranulph died in 1253, the estate going to his daughter Hepiwisa, who married Sir Eustace Balliol, and upon her death, the estate was divided amongst her six aunts. A house, Levington Manor, had been built – in all probability on the site of the existing hall. On Hepiwisa's death, this passed to her aunt Juliana – whose daughter Emma sold the manor to Sir Robert De Tilliol, Lord of Scaleby, in 1207. Thus, instead of Scaleby being in the Barony of Levington, Levington was now in the Manor of Scaleby. It appears that Levington was now known as Kirklevington.

The Tilliols owned Kirklevington for about 150 years – the male line ending in 1435 with Robert the Fool. On his death, Kirklevington passed to his sister, who married John Colville. Their son, William, died in 1479, and Scaleby together with Kirklevington were inherited by his daughter Margaret and her husband Nicholas Musgrave. It seems likely that Kirklevington was little more than a ruin in these days, the owners probably living at Scaleby.

In the Tudor period the Musgraves were allied to the Dacres by marriage – Thomas Musgrave having married Elizabeth Dacre. During the Civil War, the Musgraves supported the Royalist cause. Sir Edward Musgrave pledged both Scaleby and Kirklevington to raise and maintain a regiment for the king. On the defeat of the Royalists, Sir Edward fled to Scotland and then to the Isle of Man. Because of his bankruptcy his estates were sold and the manor of Kirklevington was purchased by Edward Appleby.

=== The original hall ===
Circa 1660, Edward Appleby built a manor house that was first known as Clough Hall, which eventually became the old wing of the existing Kirklinton Hall. He died in 1688. His son, Joseph, married Dorerthy Dacre who was the half sister and heiress to Sir James Dacre of Lanercost. Their name was changed to Dacre-Appleby and eventually (c 1743) the Appleby was dropped.

The estate was inherited by the third son of Joseph and Dorothy (as the elder sons had died in infancy) – in 1705. He married Susannah Maria Gilpin, eldest daughter of William Gilpin of Scaleby Castle (her grandfather had bought the manor of Scaleby from the bankrupt estate of Sir Richard Musgrave, at about the same time as Edward Appleby had bought the manor of Kirklevington). This son, also Joseph, was appointed Justice of the Peace, and later the High Sheriff of the County. He died in 1729, by falling down the stone stairs to the cellar and fracturing his skull. He was succeeded by his son, Joseph Dacre (b. 1711), who married Catherine Fleming of Rydal Hall in 1736, and died at the age of 68 in 1779.

The estate was inherited by their eldest son, Joseph, who died at the age of 24, and the estate passed to the younger son, Willian Richard Dacre.

William married Elizabeth Williamson. There were five children; the eldest went abroad as a young man and never returned. There is no record as to what happened to the others. Joseph, the eldest son who went abroad, married in India and had two children, Joseph and William. These two returned to England soon after the death of their father. The elder, Joseph, was of the Dacre Squires at Kirklinton (as it is now known). He never lived at the hall, which after his death was inherited by his brother William, who shortly afterwards rented it to a family called Bedington after 1807.

The farmer David Latimer, who was originally of Berwickstown, Kirklinton, and was the father of Nichol Latimer who was the publisher of The North China Herald which was the most influential newspaper in China, owned the hall during the 1820s.

In 1847, a John Holmes was renting the hall.

=== Development of the 'new' hall and its modern history ===
Owing to the loss of the Title Deeds, the history of the hall from around the time of its reconstruction in 1875 is not very clear but the following ownership is established from various sources.

==== 1869 to 1928 ====
Mr John Saul (John Kirklinton-Saul) purchased the hall around 1869. The hall passed to his wife, Mary Fredricka Kirklinton-Saul and his son, George Graham Kirklinton-Saul. Around 1875 the Kirklinton-Saul family significantly developed the original building by extending the footprint through the addition of a new wing, various outhouses and a separate coach house. The new extended building bears a date stone showing 1875 but the works were presumably carried out in the years leading up to 1875.

George Graham Kirklinton-Saul dropped the 'Saul' from his surname sometime in the late 1870's. George died in 1927, and the hall was put up for sale in 1928.

==== 1928 to 1937 ====
From 1928 the ownership of the hall was either with George's trustees or with his wife, Mary. Records are not clear of the specific ownership details and there are no records of the sale following the property being put on the market.

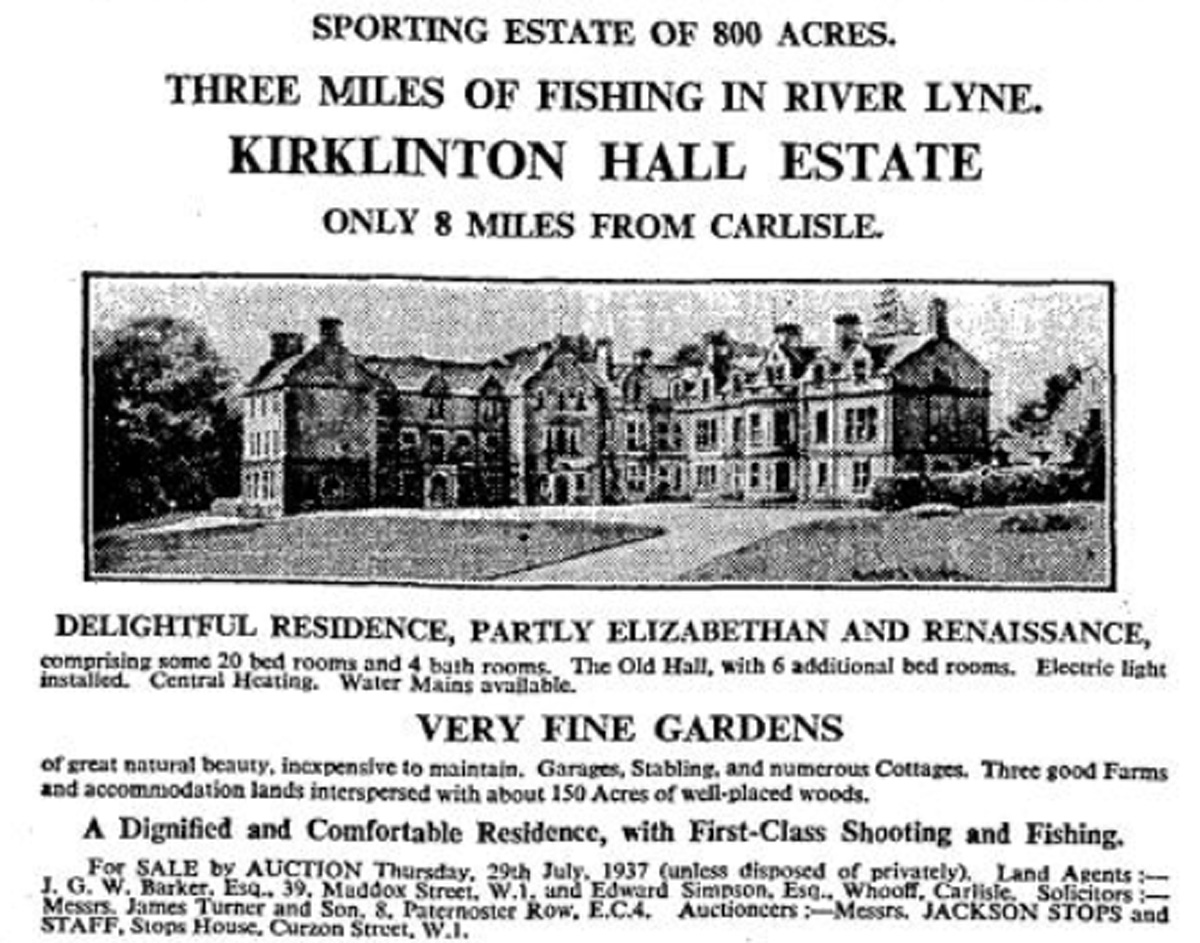
The Times newspaper advertisement for the sale of Kirklinton Hall in 1937.

Mary remained at the hall until her death in 1936. The hall was put up for sale in 1937 but there are no records of the sale.

==== 1938 to 1945 ====
Records of ownership during the war years are not clear but it is understood that Rossall School, Fleetwood, was evacuated to the hall for approximately 1 year. It is also believed that the armed forces occupied the hall at some period during the war, possibly using it as a training centre but also possibly as an officer's mess for the RAF.

==== 1945 to 1975 ====
At some time either before or after the war the hall was occupied (and presumably owned) by a lady who liked to be known as 'Lady Kirklinton' – this was not her title although it is said that she was a titled lady.

The hall had a period as six flats. Following this the hall became a hotel. From a hotel, the hall became the Border Country Club, owned and operated by Mr Caine. The club was extremely successful, but the introduction of gambling eventually brought about its downfall and closure. The then owner disappeared.

The hall was vandalised, all furniture and movable fittings were stolen (apparently quite openly), fixtures were broken and destroyed. The hall remained empty and continued to be a subject for vandalism for some years as neither the last owner nor the title deeds were ever traced.

The hall was sold by order of court in 1975. By this time, due to the effects of vandalism and time only the stonework of the hall remained in reasonable condition. At about the time of the sale, the local planning authority listed the main building and the adjoining coach house as Grade 2.

==== 1975 to 2005 ====
The hall was purchased by the McDermott family who occupied the property, as their family home, for 30 years. During this period numerous attempts were made to secure planning permission to develop the property but the local planning authority, Carlisle City Council, were never able to agree a level of enabling development that would render the restoration of the main hall buildings financially viable. Since 1975 the hall has continued to deteriorate; however, significant works were undertaken to stabilise the fabric of the property including the installation of reinforced concrete lintels and various masonry works. In addition, power, water and new on-site sewerage treatment services were installed.

==== 2005 to 2012 ====
In 2005 the property was sold to a property developer. The developer also failed to secure the necessary permission to build the properties they proposed on the site and with the onset of the financial crash in 2008, the company went into liquidation. In the 7 years that the hall was owned by the property developer further theft and vandalism left its toll on the buildings, particularly the outbuildings. Stone ridge tiles were removed exposing the timber roof trusses to the elements and various stone lintels and arch stones were taken creating significant structural damage.

==== 2012 to 2022 ====
In 2012, following the collapse of the property developer the hall was sold by auction to a local barrister, Christopher Boyle. He set about renovating the property with an initial focus on the gardens and grounds.

==== 2022 to date ====
In 2022, Mr Boyle put the hall up for sale following his divorce. The property was bought by Jessica and George Palmer, who own the property to this day. Since acquiring the estate, the Palmers have embarked on a long-term programme of restoration and regeneration. Working largely through their own efforts, the couple have focused on stabilising the remaining historic fabric of the hall while bringing the surrounding grounds and estate buildings back into active use. Their plans include the gradual restoration of the ruined manor and the continued development of the wider estate, marking a new phase in the hall’s history after decades of decline and uncertainty.

== Architectural style ==
The style of the 'new' hall is Jacobean with extensive use of Dutch style stepped gables, which were extended to use on the original building.

== Current use ==
The hall currently has three holiday lets together with a café located in the coach house. The hall is used as a wedding venue and the buildings and gardens operate as a visitor attraction during the summer months. In 2024 planning approval was sought for the siting of six 'glamping yurts' with associated shower, store buildings, kitchen and composting WC.

The owners continue to develop, repair and restore the buildings and gardens.
