= Der Ostasiatische Lloyd =

German language newspaper in Shanghai, China

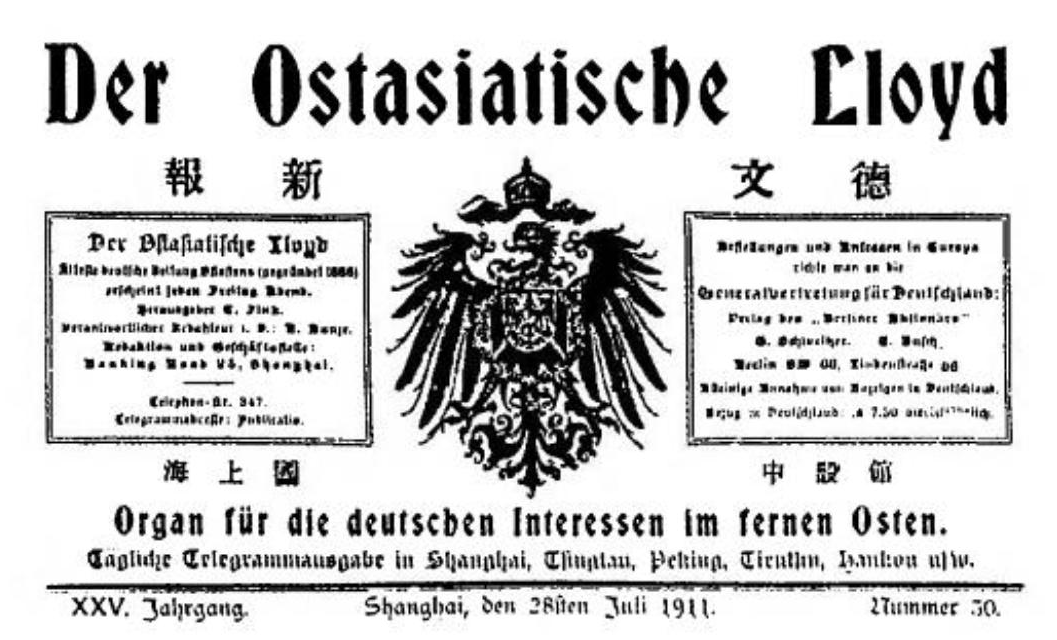
- Der Ostasiatische Lloyd, 28 July 1911
- Traditional Chinese: 德文新報
- Simplified Chinese: 德文新报
- Literal meaning: New German Newspaper
Transcriptions
Standard Mandarin
- Hanyu Pinyin: Déwén Xīnbào
- Wade–Giles: Te-wen Hsin-pao

Der Ostasiatische Lloyd (German pronunciation: [deːɐ̯ ˈʔɔstʔaˌzi̯aːtɪʃə ˈlɔɪt], lit. 'The East Asian Lloyd'; OAL) was a German language newspaper published in Shanghai, China. It served as the oldest German language newspaper in China. German communities in China and Southeast Asia read the newspaper. It was considered to be the highest quality German language newspaper in China. Most of the content focused on economics and politics, while it also had some cultural pages.

== History ==
In 1889 it was founded as a daily newspaper in Shanghai. Herr von Gundlach originally edited the paper. Bruno Navarra succeeded Gundlach as the editor. The following editor, Carl Fink (1861-1943), served from 1900 to 1917. Fink changed the newspaper into a weekly. Hartmut Walravens, author of "German Influence on the Press in China," said "there is no doubt among specialists that the Ostasiatischer Lloyd, especially under his editorship, has been not only the first but also the best German newspaper in China." In 1916 A.P. Winston, the author of "Chinese Finance Under the Republic," described the newspaper, which was managed by trained scholars, as the "chief organ of the German interests in the Far East" and that the newspaper "deserves to rank with the better class of European or American journals devoted to commerce and finance."

As World War I broke out, difficulty increased in circulating the Der Ostasiatische Lloyd to other countries, and the demand in China for news from Germany had increased. The editors of the Der Ostasiatische Lloyd started the Deutsche Zeitung für China to cope with the demand. Walravens said that the new paper was "successful".

There was an unrelated publication that was originally named the Deutsche Shanghai Zeitung and later renamed Der Ostasiatische Lloyd. That publication was associated with the Nazi Party. It was renamed and reorganized in January 1936 so it could benefit from the reputation of the previous Der Ostasiatische Lloyd.

== See also ==
- Shen Bao
- Shanghai Jewish Chronicle
- North China Daily News
- Shanghai Evening Post and Mercury
- Tsingtauer Neueste Nachrichten
