= Listed buildings in Kirklinton Middle =

Kirklinton Middle is a civil parish in the Cumberland district of Cumbria, England. It contains 14 listed buildings that are recorded in the National Heritage List for England. Of these, one is listed at Grade II*, the middle of the three grades, and the others are at Grade II, the lowest grade. The parish is almost entirely rural, and the listed buildings consist of farms and farm buildings, houses and associated structures, a former Friends' meeting house and burial wall, a church and associated structures, a former water mill, and four milestones.

== Key ==
Grade	Criteria
II*	Particularly important buildings of more than special interest
II	Buildings of national importance and special interest

== Buildings ==
Name and location	Photograph	Date	Notes	Grade
Walls around Quaker burial ground 54.98957°N 2.88189°W	—	1689	The walls surround a rectangular burial ground adjacent to a Quaker meeting house. They are in sandstone and rise to about waist height. The walls were repaired in the 18th and 19th centuries, and they contain a gate at the southwest.	II
The Gill; 54.97320°N 2.91517°W	—	1740	A farmhouse that was extended in the early 19th century, it is pebbledashed on a sandstone plinth, with stone dressings, quoins, a string course, and a Welsh slate roof with coped gables. There are two storeys and two bays with a two-bay extension to the right. The doorway has a rusticated surround, and a flat arch with voussoirs, a keystone, and a moulded cornice. The windows are sashes in plain surrounds.	II
Megs Hill Friends Meeting House; 54.98967°N 2.88230°W	—	1749	The Friends' meeting house was used only for burials and is now a storage facility. It is in brick with an asbestos sheet roof, in a single storey and with two bays. In the front wall is an entrance with a chamfered sandstone surround and windows with segmental heads. The left wall contains a 20th-century opening, and at the rear there are four buttresses.	II
Fergushill and stables 54.98716°N 2.89939°W	—	18th century	Originally a cottage that was enlarged three times during the 19th century. The original part is in sandstone, the extensions are partly in brick, and the roof is in green and Welsh slate. The house has a complex plan, and is in one, 1 1/2 and two storeys. Features include bay windows, dormers, and decorative bargeboards; some windows are mullioned, some are sashes, and others are casements. The stables of 1832 contain wooden Gothic stalls.	II
Former Water-Mill, Hether Mill; 54.98691°N 2.88372°W	—	Late 18th century	The water mill was extended in the 19th century, and has since been used for other purposes. It is in sandstone, with a roof partly of Westmorland slate, and partly of Welsh slate, and with a coped gable at the southwest end. The building has a linear plan, with an external wheel at the northeast end, a drying kiln, and external steps leading to a loft platform. There are two doorways with quoined surrounds.	II
Skitby; 54.98244°N 2.86439°W	—	1794	A sandstone farmhouse on a chamfered plinth with pilaster quoins and a Welsh slate roof. There are two storeys and three bays. The doorway has a fanlight and a dated and inscribed lintel. The doorway and the sash windows have plain surrounds.	II
Milestone; 54.97747°N 2.86376°W	—	1807 (probable)	The milestone was provided for the Brampton to Longtown Turnpike. It is in sandstone, and consists of a square stone set at an angle with the faces inscribed with the distances in miles to Brampton and to Longtown.	II
Milestone; 54.98054°N 2.88731°W	—	1807 (probable)	The milestone was provided for the Brampton to Longtown Turnpike. It is in sandstone, and consists of a square stone set at an angle with the faces inscribed with the distances in miles to Brampton and to Longtown.	II
Milestone; 54.98417°N 2.91202°W	—	1807 (probable)	The milestone was provided for the Brampton to Longtown Turnpike. It is in sandstone, and consists of a square stone set at an angle with the faces inscribed with the distances in miles to Brampton and to Longtown.	II
Alstonby Hall; 54.97826°N 2.92384°W	—	Early 19th century	Originally a hunting lodge, it was extended later in the 19th century. The original lodge is in calciferous sandstone on a chamfered plinth with a hipped slate roof. There is a single storey, four bays, a recessed and stepped Ionic tetrastyle loggia, a pointed entrance arch with a hood mould, a door with a fanlight, and pointed casement windows. The extension is in red sandstone with a string course, a moulded cornice, and a slate roof. It has two storeys, two bays, a projecting porch, and a polygonal bay window with angle buttresses rising to finials.	II
Lyne Cottage; 54.99361°N 2.90277°W	—	Early 19th century	Probably originally a hunting lodge, the house is in brick on a sandstone plinth, with a hipped slate roof. There are 1 1/2 storeys at the front, two storeys at the rear, and two bays. The doorway has reeded pilasters with a moulded cornice, an elliptical brick arch, and a radial fanlight. The windows are sashes with flat brick arches and stone sills, and on the front is a gabled dormer.	II
Wall, Lyne Cottage; 54.99357°N 2.90268°W	—	Early 19th century	The wall encloses a garden to the south of the house and it extends to the east. It is in brick on a sandstone plinth, with corner quoins and calciferous sandstone slab coping.	II
St Cuthbert's Church; 54.99466°N 2.88834°W		1845	The church, built on the site of an earlier church, incorporates some medieval features. It is in sandstone on a rusticated plinth, and has a green slate roof. The church consists of a nave with a south porch, a chancel, and a west tower. The tower is in three stages, and has angle buttresses, a string course and a corbelled battlemented parapet. Along the sides of the church are lancet windows between buttresses, and at the east end is a triple lancet, and a coped gable with a cross finial. The tower arch, which was originally the chancel arch, dates from the 12th century.	II*
Gates, piers, walls and lamps, St Cuthbert's Church; 54.99466°N 2.88879°W		1845 (probable)	The walls and gate piers are in sandstone. The piers are octagonal with moulded caps, and are flanked by coped walls ending in square columns. The gates are in cast iron with speared rails, and there are copper lamps on scrolled cast iron supports.	II
