= Ralph Shaw (writer) =

British writer (1913–1996)

Charles Frederick Ralph Shaw (13 August 1913 – 10 September 1996) was a British author and journalist.

Although Shaw was born in Nuneaton, Warwickshire, he always considered himself a Yorkshireman. He was the older of two boys and grew up in Keighley and Rugby. He maintained various jobs after leaving school, one as a local journalist for the Rugby Advertiser and subsequently on the North China Daily News, Shanghai from 1937 to 1949.

Shaw wrote his first book Sin City as a result of his experiences as a journalist and a Japanese prisoner of war in Shanghai, China. He spent many years of his life living and working abroad as a journalist in Shanghai, China, Brunei, Pakistan, Kuwait and the United Arab Emirates. He also contributed to The Times. In 1976 his second book, Kuwait, was published by Macmillan. This was a highly informative book about Kuwait describing the transformation of the country over a 25-year period.

Shaw died on 10 September 1996 and is buried in Kent. He was married and had one daughter.
