= Carl Crow =

American journalist and advertising executive in Shanghai

Carl Crow (1884–1945) was a Highland, Missouri-born newspaperman, businessman, and writer who managed several newspapers and then opened the first Western advertising agency in Shanghai, China. He ran the agency for 19 years, creating calendar advertisements. He was also the founding editor of the Shanghai Evening Post and Mercury.

== Career ==
Carl Crow arrived in Shanghai in 1911 and for a quarter of a century worked there as a journalist, newspaper proprietor, and ad-man. He also did stints as a hostage negotiator, emergency police sergeant, gentleman farmer, go-between for the American government, and propagandist. As his career progressed, so did the fortunes of Shanghai. The city transformed itself from a colonial backwater when Crow arrived, to the cosmopolitan metropolis of the 1930s when Crow wrote his pioneering book 400 Million Customers, which encouraged a flood of business into China.

In 1935, the Shanghai Municipal Council published a map for visitors to the city which they commissioned Crow to produce. A reproduction of the map was printed in 2005 to help fund the copying of the archive of Crow's unpublished works, diaries and correspondence held at the University of Missouri.

Among Crow's exploits were attending the negotiations in Peking which led to the fall of the Qing Dynasty, getting a scoop on the Japanese interference in China during the First World War, negotiating the release of a group of western hostages from mountain bandits, and being one of the first westerners to journey up the Burma Road during the Second World War. He met and interviewed most of the major figures of the time, including Sun Yat-sen, Chiang Kai-shek, the Soong sisters, and Mao Zedong's second-in-command Zhou Enlai. During the Second World War he worked for American intelligence alongside Owen Lattimore, co-ordinating US policies to support China against Japan.

He was very anti-Japanese, and fearing retribution he left Shanghai for good in 1937, just days after the Japanese attacked as part of the Second Sino-Japanese War's Battle of Shanghai.

He returned to Chongqing in 1939, entering China via the Burma Road from Rangoon to Kunming. He wrote a diary of this time which has been edited by Shanghai-based English writer Paul French, and published as Carl Crow: The Long Road Back to China.

He died in Manhattan in 1945.

== Works and impact ==
With A.R. Burt and J.B. Powell, Crow published the bilingual Biographies of Prominent Chinese (c. 1925). In the 1930s and 1940s, Crow wrote 13 books. Master Kung: The Story of Confucius (1937), Time magazine wrote that to "orthodox Confucians Author Crow's Confucius may sometimes seem confusing. But they will have to admit that he succeeds in peeling off a lot of the 24-century coating of official lacquer. In fact, as Author Crow portrays him, the huge, ugly wise man emerges with a look as human as Benjamin Franklin's." This was followed by the anecdotal The Chinese are Like That (1938), titled My Friends the Chinese in England.

Crow's most popular book, 400 Million Customers (1937), won one of the early National Book Awards: the Most Original Book of 1937, voted by members of the American Booksellers Association. The book argued that foreign businessmen had to listen to their Chinese customers to meet their surprising but ultimately comprehensible requests. Chinese were customers, not bosses. The book has been reprinted at least twice in the new millennium. The historian Jerry Israel, however, wrote that Crows China had no misery, wretchedness, poverty or . . . revolution. He looked for Four Hundred Million Customers, but perhaps found Four Hundred Million Number One Boys.

== Important works ==
- 1913 – The Travelers Handbook for China, Hwa-Mei Book Concern, Shanghai, (1913)
- 1914 – America and the Philippines, Doubleday, Page & Company, Garden City, NY, (1914)
- 1916 – Japan and America: A Contrast, Robert M McBride & Company, New York, (1916)
- c. 1925 - Biographies of Prominent Chinese, Biographical Publishing Company Inc., Shanghai, (c. 1925)
- 1933 – Handbook for China. (Hong Kong, Shanghai, Singapore: Kelly & Walsh, 5th, 1933). Reprinted: with an Introduction by H.J. Lethbridge (Hong Kong, Oxford: Oxford University Press; 1986).
- 1937 – I Speak for the Chinese, Harper & Brothers, New York, (1937)
- 1937 – Four Hundred Million Customers, Harper & Brothers, New York, (1937). Various reprints, including with an Introduction by Ezra Vogel (White Plains, NY: EastBridge Books, 2003 ISBN 9781891936074); with an Introduction by Paul French (Earnshaw, 2003; ISBN 1-891936-07-7); Kegan Paul (2006) ISBN 0-7103-1212-1}.
- 1938 – Master Kung: The Story of Confucius, Harper & Brothers, New York and London, (1938)
- 1938 – The Chinese Are Like That, Harper & Brothers, New York, (1938) (Also published as My Friends the Chinese, Hamish Hamilton, London (1938))
- 1939 – He Opened the Door of Japan: Townsend Harris and the Story of His Amazing Adventures in Establishing American Relations with the Far East., Harper & Brothers, New York, (1939). Sometimes known by the alternative title Harris of Japan
- 1940 – Foreign Devils in the Flowery Kingdom, Harper & Brothers, New York, (1940).
- 1940 – Meet the South Americans, Harper & Brothers, New York, (1940)
- 1942 – Japan's Dream of World Empire: The Tanaka Memorial, Harper & Brothers, New York, (1942)
- 1943 – The Great American Customer, Harper & Brothers, New York, (1943)
- 1944 – China Takes Her Place, Harper & Brothers, New York, (1944)
- 1945 – The City of Flint Grows Up, Harper & Brothers, New York, (1945)
- 2009 – The Long Road Back to China: The Burma Road Wartime Diaries (written 1939, pub. 2009)

== References and further reading ==
- French, Paul (2006), Carl Crow, a Tough Old China Hand: The Life, Times, and Adventures of an American in Shanghai, Hong Kong University Press, ISBN 962-209-802-9.
- French, Paul. Through the Looking Glass: Foreign Journalists in China, from the Opium Wars to Mao. Hong Kong University Press, 2009.* Elizabeth Ingleson, "Four Hundred Million Customers: Carl Crow and the Legacy of 1930s Sino-American Trade", Australasian Journal of American Studies Vol. 35, No. 1
