= New Asia Hotel (Shanghai) =

Hotel in Shanghai, China

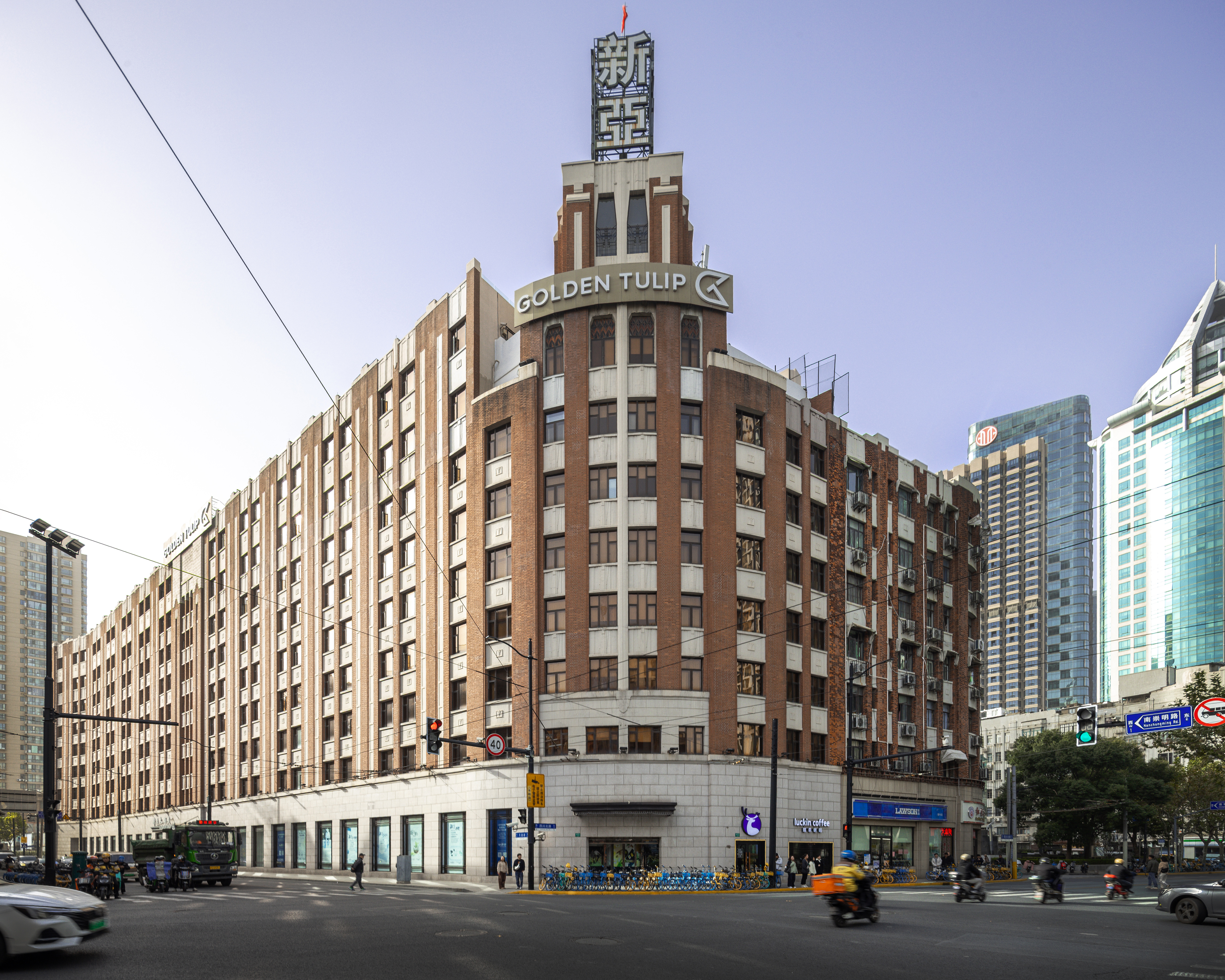
Golden Tulip Bund New Asia in 2025

Golden Tulip New Asia Hotel (Chinese: 新亚大酒店) is a 9-storey hotel and historic landmark in Hongkou, Shanghai. The hotel is situated at 422 Tiantong Road, opposite the Shanghai General Post Office Building. It was built in 1934 and was renovated in 2007.
