= Smithfield, Cumbria =

Village in Cumbria, England

Coordinates: 54.9795°N 2.8745°W

Smithfield
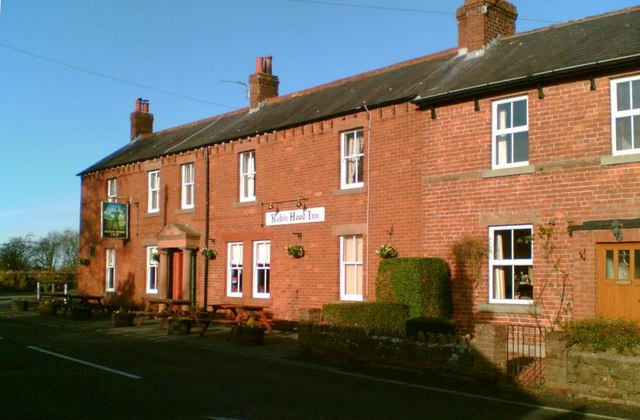
- The Robin Hood Inn public house, Smithfield

- Location in the former Carlisle district, Cumbria Location within Cumbria
- Population: around 250
- OS grid reference: NY441653
- Civil parish: Kirklinton Middle
- Unitary authority: Cumberland
- Ceremonial county: Cumbria
- Region: North West
- Country: England
- Sovereign state: United Kingdom
- Post town: CARLISLE
- Postcode district: CA6
- Dialling code: 01228
- Police: Cumbria
- Fire: Cumbria
- Ambulance: North West
- UK Parliament: Carlisle

Smithfield is a village located in the parish of Kirklinton Middle approximately 8 miles north of Carlisle in Cumbria, England, and has a population of around 250. The main road through the village, the A6071, leads to the nearby market towns of Longtown (west, 4 miles) and Brampton (east, 6 miles).

Smithfield can be described as a commuter village with the vast majority of the adult population working in Carlisle. With infrequent public transport (Stagecoach) to Carlisle, most journeys are made by car.
