= Deutsche Shanghai Zeitung =

German language newspaper in Shanghai, China

- Type: Newspaper
- Owner: Max Simon-Eberhard
- Editor: Max Simon-Eberhard
- Founded: September 27, 1932
- Political alignment: Nazi
- Language: German
- City: Shanghai
- Country: China

The Deutsche Shanghai Zeitung (German pronunciation: [ˈdɔʏtʃə ˈʃaŋhaɪ ˈtsaɪtʊŋ]; transl. "German Shanghai Newspaper"; DSZ), later Der Ostasiatische Lloyd, was a German language newspaper published in Shanghai, China. That publication was associated with the Nazi Party.

== History ==
The newspaper was established on 27 September 1932. The paper was owned and edited by Max Simon-Eberhard, a former army captain. Hartmut Walravens, author of "German Influence on the Press in China," said that the newspaper did not do well initially, but after Paul Huldermann, a professional journalist, took control, the performance improved. The newspaper was renamed and reorganized in January 1936 so it could benefit from the reputation of the previous Ostasiatischer Lloyd.

== See also ==
- Shen Bao
- Shanghai Jewish Chronicle
- North China Daily News
- Shanghai Evening Post and Mercury
- Tsingtauer Neueste Nachrichten
