= Tsingtauer Neueste Nachrichten =

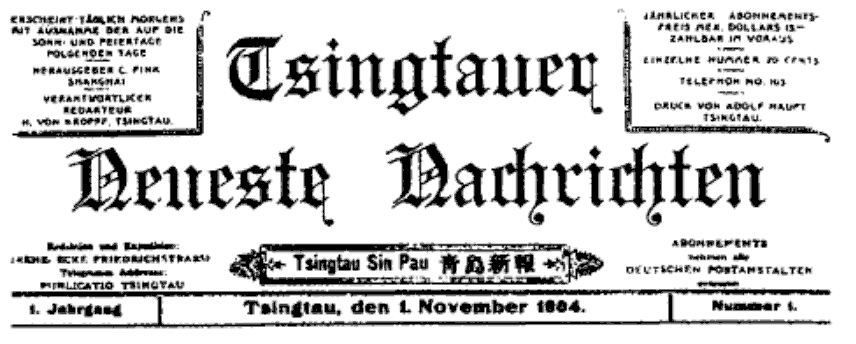
- Tsingtauer Neueste Nachrichten (Tsingtau Sin Pau), 1 November 1904
- Traditional Chinese: 青島新報
- Simplified Chinese: 青岛新报
- Literal meaning: Qingdao Newspaper
Transcriptions
Standard Mandarin
- Hanyu Pinyin: Qīngdǎo Xīnbào
- Wade–Giles: Ch'ing-tao Hsin-pao

The Tsingtauer Neueste Nachrichten (German: [ˈtsɪŋtaʊɐ ˈnɔʏəstə ˈnaːxˌʁɪçtn̩]; transl. "Qingdao Latest News"; Chinese: 青島新報; Tsingtau Sin Pau; transl. "Qingdao Newspaper") was a German-language newspaper published in Qingdao from 1904 to 1914. Fritz Seeker was the editor.

The newspaper served the locals in Qingdao and various German companies in the Far East. The newspaper reported on the management of the Kiautschou Bay concession, activity of Western powers in East Asia, and the methods and trades of Christian missionaries. When World War I broke out, the Japanese took over Qingdao and the publishing of German newspapers ended.

== See also ==
- Der Ostasiatische Lloyd
- Deutsche Shanghai Zeitung
