= General Post Office Building, Shanghai =

Head post office of Shanghai, China

Coordinates: 31°14′47.05″N 121°28′48.06″E

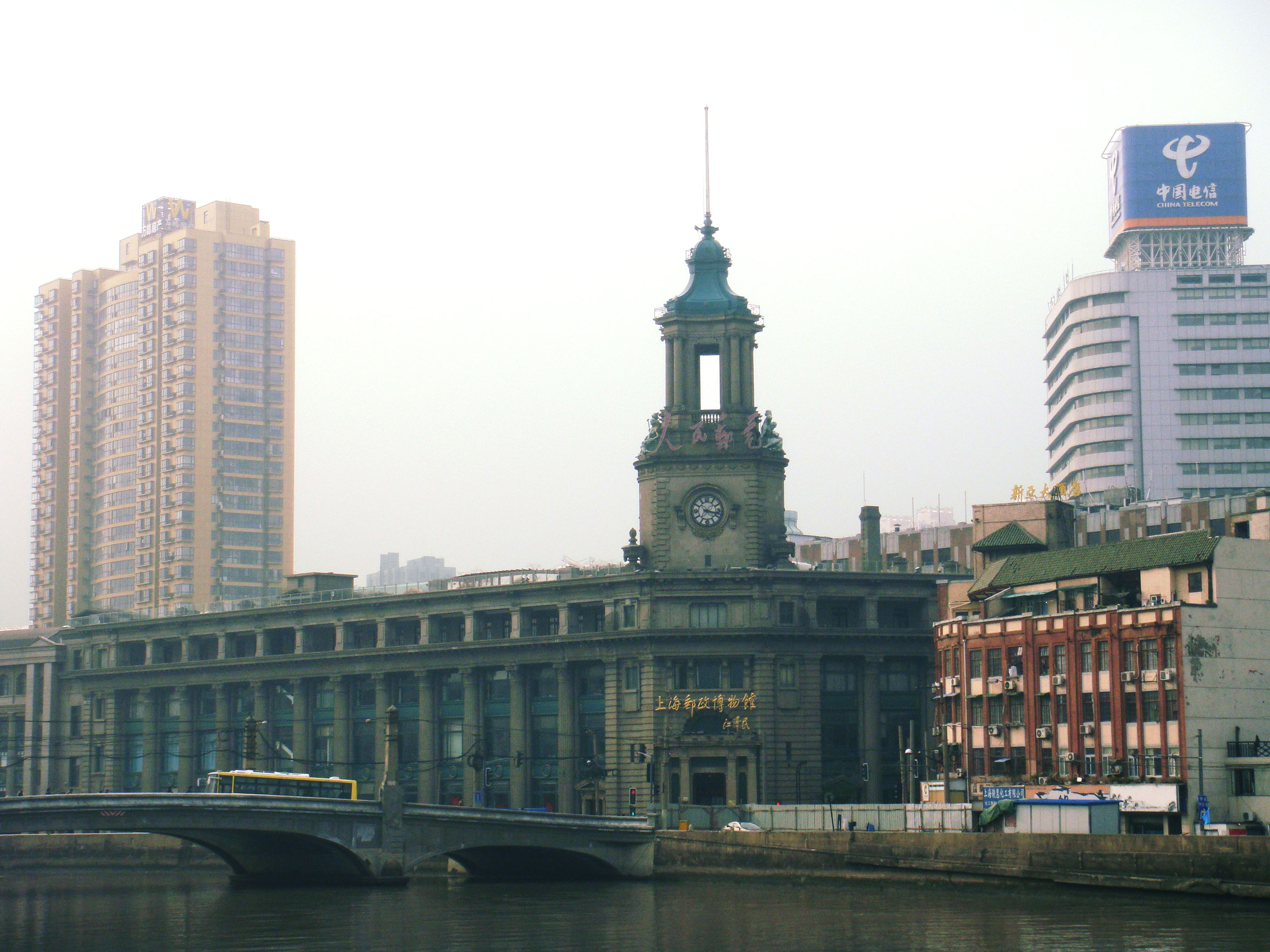
General Post Office Building viewed from the east

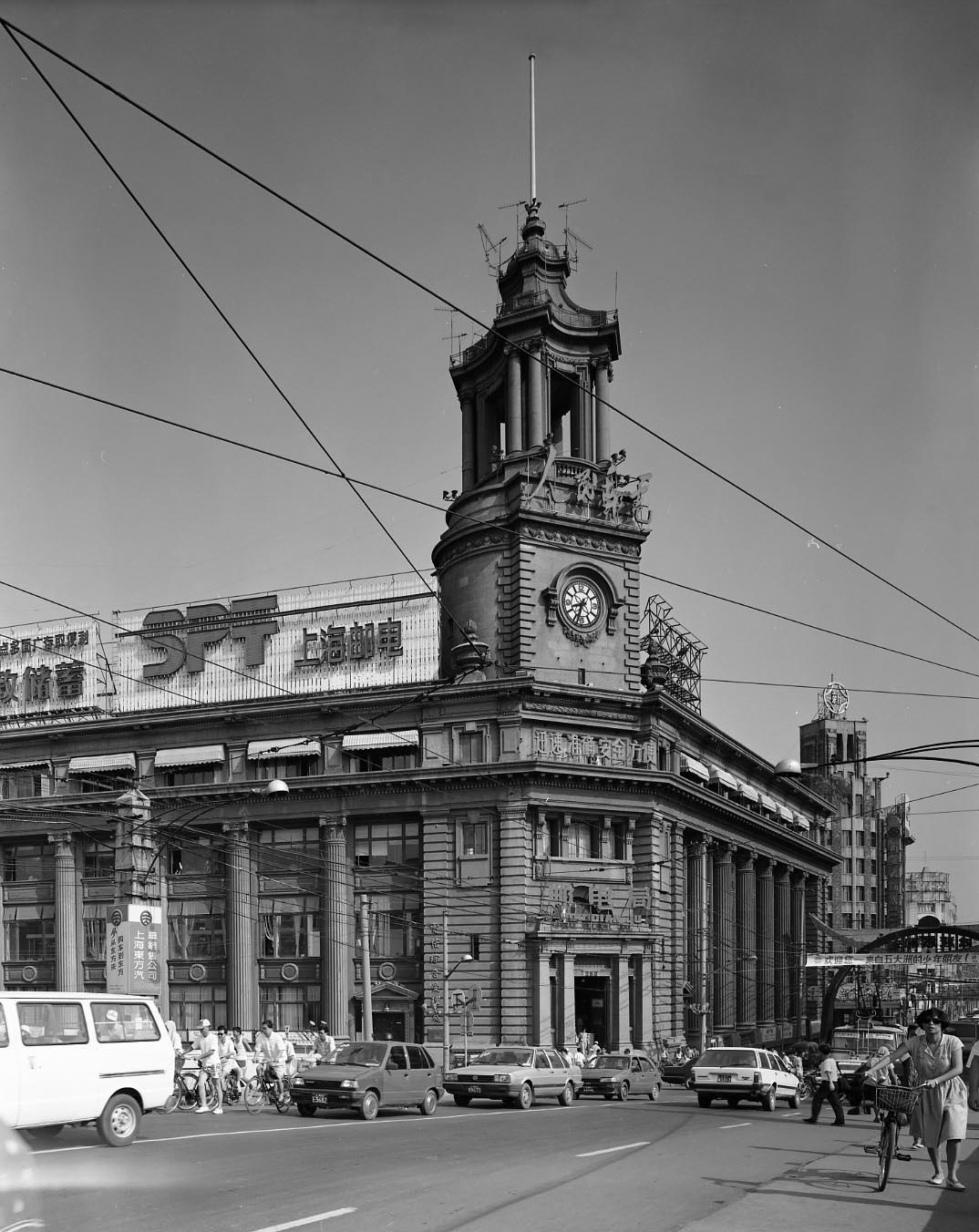
General Post Office in 1994

The General Post Office Building (Chinese: 上海邮政总局大楼) is the head post office of Shanghai, China. Built in 1924, the four-story building is located at 395 Tiandong Road, at the north end of the Sichuan Road Bridge, on the banks of the Suzhou Creek.

== History ==
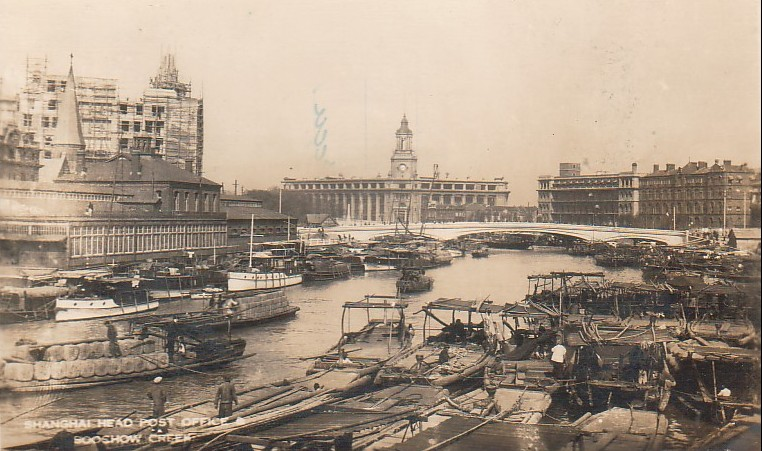
The General Post Office up Suzhou Creek from Garden Bridge in the 1920s

In the early years of the Republic of China (ROC), Shanghai was the center of China's postal network. In 1914, China joined the Universal Postal Union, and Shanghai was designated as the exchange for international mail. By the early 1920s, the previous premises of the postal administration was no longer adequate, and land was acquired on the north bank of Suzhou Creek for the construction of a new headquarters building. The building was situated within the Shanghai International Settlement, midway between the central business district and the Shanghai North Railway Station.

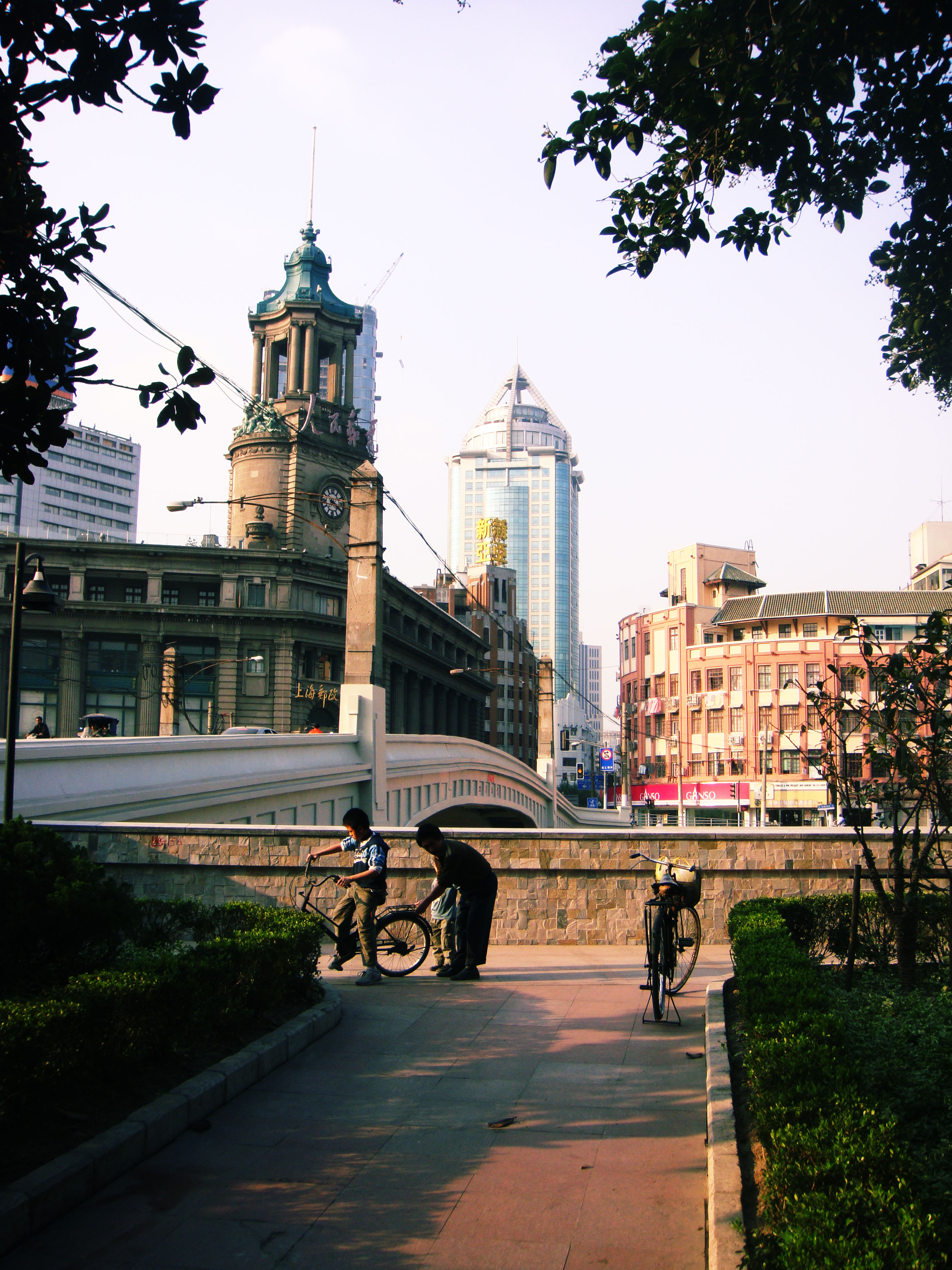
General Post Office Building viewed from across Suzhou Creek

Built from 1922 to 1924 and designed by Stewardson & Spence, the building is in Classical style. Its two main facades use three-story high grand order Corinthian columns. The main door is on the corner, and is topped by a Baroque style clock tower. The sides of the clocktower are decorated with three statuary groups. The central group features Hermes, flanked by Eros and Aphrodite, the god and goddess of love. On the second level is the 1200 square meter main trading hall, which was known as the "First Hall of the Far East". The foundations of the building used an ingenious system of tanks, which was filled and drained by water from neighbouring Suzhou Creek as water levels rose and fell. This ensured that the building remained stable and level despite changes in water levels.

After the Chinese Civil War the building continued to house the headquarters of Shanghai's postal administration. From 2003, parts of the building, including the courtyard, was converted into Shanghai Postal Museum. Admission to the museum is free. Postal administration functions had moved out, but the retail post office operation continue from the trading hall (though that is now only a fraction of its original size). It is protected as a National Artefact Preservation Unit.

== See also ==
- New Asia Hotel
