= Kirklinton Middle =

Civil parish in Cumbria, England

Coordinates: 54.99°N 2.89°W

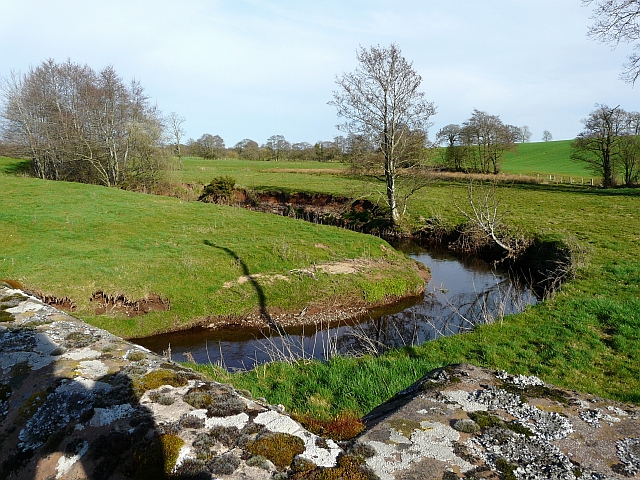
Hether Burn in the parish

Kirklinton Middle is a civil parish in the Cumberland district of Cumbria, England. At the 2011 census, it had a population of 384.

The parish is bordered to the north west by Arthuret, the boundary following the River Lyne; to the north east by Hethersgill; to the south east by Scaleby; and to the south west by Westlinton. The A6071 road from Longtown to Brampton runs through the parish. The small village of Kirklinton lies in the extreme north east of the parish, and is partly in the parish of Hethersgill (thus, the church is in Kirklinton but the adjacent vicarage is in Hethersgill).

There is a parish council, the lowest tier of local government.

== Listed buildings ==
As of 2017 there were 14 listed buildings in the parish, of which the 1845 St Cuthbert's Church is at grade II* and the others at grade II.
