= Hethersgill =

Village and civil parish in Cumbria, England

Coordinates: 54.996°N 2.817°W

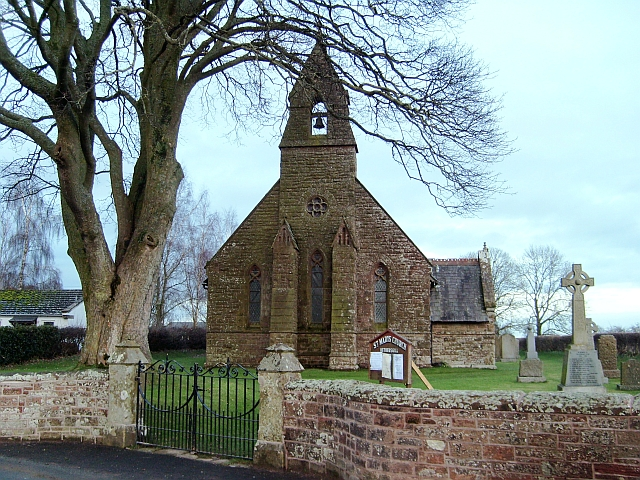
- St. Mary's Church

- Location within Cumbria
- Population: 350 (2021 census)
- OS grid reference: NY477671
- Civil parish: Hethersgill
- Unitary authority: Cumberland
- Ceremonial county: Cumbria
- Region: North West
- Country: England
- Sovereign state: United Kingdom
- Post town: Carlisle
- Postcode district: CA6
- Dialling code: 01228
- Police: Cumbria
- Fire: Cumbria
- Ambulance: North West
- UK Parliament: Carlisle

Hethersgill is a village and a civil parish in the Cumberland district, in the ceremonial county of Cumbria, England. Hethersgill has a church called St Mary's Church. The civil parish, which also includes the hamlet Boltonfellend, had a population of 350 in 2021.

== Governance ==
For local government, Hethersgill is in Cumberland unitary district. For elections to Cumberland Council, it is in Houghton and Irthington electoral ward.

Hethersgill was a township in the parish of Kirklinton until it became a separate civil parish in 1866. In the administrative county of Cumberland, it was in Longtown Rural District from 1894 until 1934, and then Border Rural District until 1974. It was then in the Carlisle District of Cumbria until 2023, when the present Cumberland district was created.

== Demographics ==
Census population of Hethersgill parish
| Census | Population | Female | Male | Households | Source |
|---|---|---|---|---|---|
| 2001 | 382 | 184 | 198 | 152 | |
| 2011 | 371 | 189 | 182 | 164 | |
| 2021 | 350 | 169 | 181 | 159 | |

== See also ==
- Listed buildings in Hethersgill
