= North China Daily News =

1850–1951 English newspaper in Shanghai

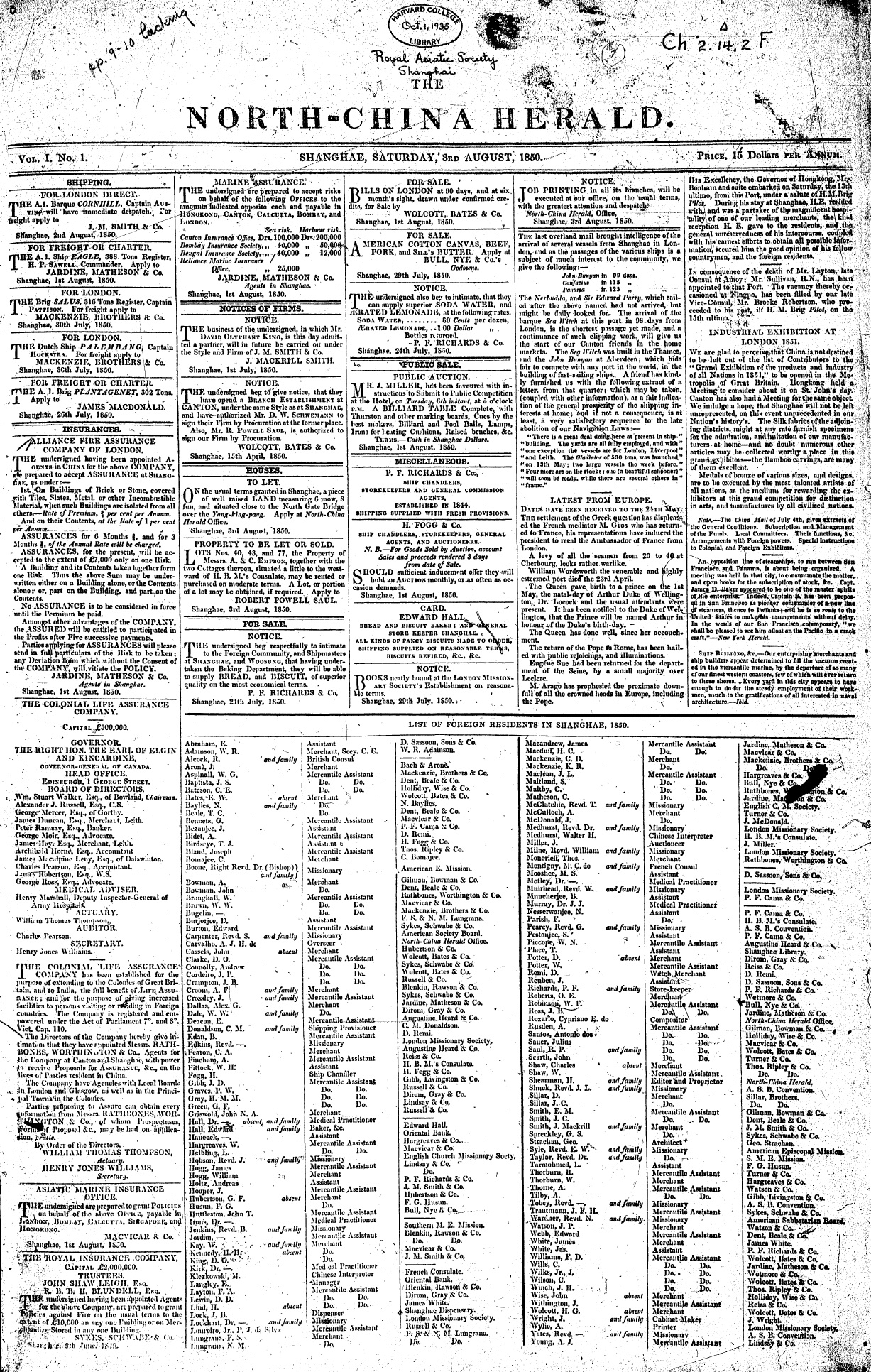
- Front page of the inaugural issue of the North China Herald (August 3, 1850)
- Type: Defunct
- Founded: 1850
- Ceased publication: 1941
- Language: English
- City: Shanghai
- Country: China

North China Daily News
- Traditional Chinese: 字林西報
- Simplified Chinese: 字林西报
Transcriptions
Standard Mandarin
- Hanyu Pinyin: Zìlín Xībào

The North China Daily News (in Chinese: Zilin Xibao) was an English-language newspaper in Shanghai, China, called the most influential foreign newspaper of its time.

== History ==
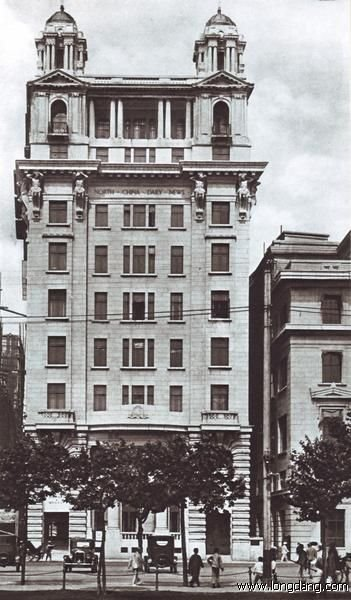
Offices of the North China Daily News in Shanghai, ca. 1920

The paper was founded as the weekly North-China Herald (北华捷报; 北華捷報; Běihuá Jiébào) and was first published on 3 August 1850. Its founder, British auctioneer Henry Shearman (奚安门; 奚安門; Xī Ānmén), died in 1856.

A daily edition commenced publication on 1 June 1864 as the North China Daily News. The North-China Herald was also the gazette (official record) of the British Supreme Court for China and Japan and the British Consulate. Briton Nichol Latimer (who was the manager of Russell & Company's Shanghai Steam Navigation Co.) was the publisher of the North China Herald from 1863 until his death in 1865, during which period it was the most influential newspaper in China. For much of the period it was published under the masthead North-China Herald and Supreme Court and Consular Gazette. Its circulation peaked at 7,817 copies.

A notable early editor was Frederic H. Balfour. Other editors included Archibald Little's brother R. W. "Bob" Little (李德立; Lǐ Délì), who also served on the Shanghai International Settlement's Municipal Council.

In 1901, the paper was purchased by Henry E. Morriss (马立斯; 馬立斯; Mǎ Lìsī). In 1920, the paper passed to his son, H.E. Morriss Jr., who used his money to build a compound of luxurious houses which became today's Ruijin Hotel, as well as the Canidrome, a dog-racing stadium. One of the two Morrisses also purchased the Hellier Stradivarius.

In 1924, the newspaper moved its headquarters to the new North China Daily News Building at Number 17 on the Bund, then the tallest building in Shanghai.

Between 1925 and 1949, the paper employed a former officer of the Russian Imperial Army, Georgi Sapojnikov, as its daily cartoonist. Drawing under the signature of "Sapajou" he was noted for his perceptive coverage of the complex politics of contemporary China and the extremes of life and society in Shanghai during this period.

The North-China Herald and the daily edition suspended publication after 8 December 1941, at the start of the Pacific War, and was never resumed. On 31 March 1951, the North China Daily News officially suspended publication on the orders of the ruling Chinese Communist Party and the North China Daily News Building was seized by the Shanghai municipal government of the People's Republic of China.

The Shanghai Library has an incomplete collection of back issues of the North China Daily News and the North-China Herald at the Bibliotheca Zi-Ka-Wei (in Xujiahui).

== See also ==
- History of newspapers and magazines § China
- Shen Bao
- Shanghai Evening Post and Mercury
- Der Ostasiatische Lloyd
- Shanghai Jewish Chronicle
- Deutsche Shanghai Zeitung
