= Listed buildings in Dalston, Cumbria =

Dalston is a civil parish in the Cumberland district of Cumbria, England. It contains 93 buildings that are recorded in the National Heritage List for England. Of these, three are listed at Grade I, the highest of the three grades, four are at Grade II*, the middle grade, and the others are at Grade II, the lowest grade. The parish contains the village of Dalston and smaller scattered settlements, including Stockdalewath, Raughton Head, Cumdivock, Cardew, Hawkesdale, Buckabank, and Gaitsgill, but is mainly rural. The most important building in the parish is Rose Castle, a fortified house that later became the residence of the bishops of Carlisle. Most of the listed buildings are houses and associated structures, farmhouses and farm buildings. The other listed buildings include churches, bridges, public houses, a boundary stone, a former threshing mill, a former workhouse, a village hall, two war memorials, and a commemorative seat.

== Key ==
Grade	Criteria
I	Buildings of exceptional interest, sometimes considered to be internationally important
II*	Particularly important buildings of more than special interest
II	Buildings of national importance and special interest

== Buildings ==
Name and location	Photograph	Date	Notes	Grade
St Michael's Church; 54.84222°N 2.98344°W		12th century	The church was partly rebuilt in 1749 and restored in 1890 by C. J. Ferguson. It is built in sandstone and has a green slate roof with coped gables. The church consists of a nave, aisles with a north porch, north and south transepts, and a chancel with a north vestry. On the west gable is an open double bellcote. Incorporated in the porch is a Norman capital. In the chancel is a priest's doorway with a gable, and the east window is a stepped triple lancet.	II*
Rose Castle; 54.8064°N 2.9803°W		13th century	Originally a manor house, then a fortified house, and later the residence of the bishops of Carlisle, it was expanded and altered on numerous occasions, including in 1828–30 by Thomas Rickman, and in 1851–52 by Anthony Salvin. It is built in large blocks of sandstone on chamfered plinths, with string courses, battlemented parapets, and roofs in slate and lead. The building contains four three-storey towers, and a hall and chapel in an L-shaped plan, forming two sides of what was a four-sided courtyard.	I
Curtain walls, Rose Castle; 54.80611°N 2.97991°W		14th century	The curtain walls are built from large blocks of sandstone. On the east and south sides they are on a chamfered plinth. The northeast wall is on segmental vaulted arches, and contains the remains of a watch tower. The wall has been interrupted by later buildings, it was lowered in the 19th century, and it has a 19th-century coping.	I
Dalston Hall; 54.8550°N 2.9725°W		c. 1498	Originally a fortified house, later a country house, and then a hotel, it was extended in the 1610s, and a new entrance front was added in 1899–1900 by C. J. Ferguson. It is built in large blocks of red sandstone and calciferous sandstone, and has lead roofs on the towers and green slate roofs elsewhere. The hall consists of a three-storey 15th-century tower to the right, a four-storey 16th-century tower to the left, between which is a 16th-century wing with an early 17th-century two-storey entrance bay. These are flanked by late 19th-century wings, and there is a 19th-century extension at the rear. The older tower has very thick walls and a battlemented parapet, and there is an angle stair turret with carved coats of arms. The windows are mullioned.	II*
Cardew Hall; 54.83921°N 3.01399°W	—	Early 16th century (probable)	A farmhouse that was extended and altered on a number of occasions. It is in sandstone on a squared plinth, and the original part has thick walls. The roofs are tiled. The house has two storeys, the original part has three bays, the 17th-century extension has two, and the 18th-century wing at right angles has two bays. In the original part is a doorway with a pilastered surround, and there is a 20th-century porch. The windows are of mixed types; some are mullioned, and others are sash windows or casements.	II
Gate, lodge and tower, Rose Castle; 54.80707°N 2.98027°W		Early 16th century	The gateway passes through the curtain wall of the castle, and is flanked by the remains of the Water Tower on the left and of the lodge on the right. The building is in large blocks of sandstone. The gateway has a large segmental arch with a carved panel, a pedestrian pointed arch to the right, and a battlemented parapet. The former tower has a blocked entrance with a chamfered surround, and the remains of the lodge form part of the curtain wall.	I
25 and 26 The Square; 54.84198°N 2.98425°W	—	Mid-16th century	A pair of cottages in pebbledashed sandstone with brick additions on a cruck frame, and with a slate roof. They are in a single storey with five bays, and there is a small lean-to extension at the rear. The doorways and windows, which are sashes have plain surrounds. Parts of the cruck frame are visible internally.	II
Fountain Head and adjoining barn 54.82536°N 2.99486°W	—	Late 16th century (probable)	The original house was extended in 1633, and later used as a barn. The building is in sandstone with quoins and a sandstone slate roof with a coped gable on the right. There are two storeys, the original house has three bays, and the extension has two. The original house has a projecting cart entrance and mullioned windows. The extension has a door in a chamfered surround with a dated and inscribed lintel, and sash windows in stone surrounds. There is also a 19th-century outshut with casement windows.	II
Hudbeck and outbuildings 54.78308°N 2.97794°W	—	Late 16th or early 17th century	The original farmhouse is used as an outbuilding, and the current farmhouse, with its outbuilding, dates from the 18th century. The original building is in sandstone with projecting plinth stones and a green slate roof. It has a single storey with an attic, and three bays with a single-bay extension to the right. It contains mullioned windows with hood moulds and a fire window, all with chamfered surrounds. In the extension is a horizontally-sliding sash window, and there are external steps leading to a loft door. Inside are two pairs of upper crucks. The present farmhouse is pebbledashed with an eaves cornice, the outbuilding is rendered, and the roof has coped gables. The doorway has an architrave, a fanlight, a datestone, and a moulded cornice.	II
The Gill; 54.82664°N 3.00135°W	—	1626	A stuccoed farmhouse with a Welsh slate roof that was altered in the 18th century. It has two storeys, four bays, and a three-bay span at the rear. The doorway has a pilastered surround and a pedimented cornice. The windows are sashes with round heads in stone surrounds, and there is one small window at the rear with a chamfered surround.	II
The Oaks; 54.82633°N 2.98409°W	—	Early or mid-17th century	The house was extended to the left in the late 18th century, The original part is built in large blocks of sandstone with a sandstone slate roof. It has two storeys and five bays. In the central bay the doorway, now converted into a window, has a bolection moulded architrave. The ground floor windows are sashes in architraves under hood moulds, and in the upper floor are horizontally-sliding sash windows with chamfered surrounds and hood moulds. The extension is higher, in sandstone, with quoins in calciferous sandstone, and a hipped green slate roof. It has two storeys and three bays. On the front is a doorway with a radial fanlight and a Doric doorcase with an open pediment. The windows are sashes with stone surrounds.	II
Brackenhow; 54.82804°N 2.97154°W	—	Mid-to-late 17th century	A stuccoed farmhouse that has a green slate roof with coped gables. There are two storeys and six bays. The door is in an architrave, and there is a continuous hood mould on both floors. The windows are mullioned in chamfered surrounds, and there are also fire windows with chamfered surrounds.	II
Roewath; 54.79198°N 2.95239°W	—	Mid-or-late 17th century	The house was extended in the late 18th century. The original part is in sandstone on a chamfered plinth, and has quoins, a string course, an eaves cornice, and a green slate roof. There are two storeys, five bays, casement windows with chamfered surrounds and mullions removed, and small fire windows. The extension is rendered, and its roof has coped gables. It is higher, with two storeys and five bays, and has a doorway in an architrave with a keystone, and sash windows in architraves.	II
Red Spears; 54.79008°N 2.96899°W	—	1671	Originally a farmhouse, later a private house, it is in sandstone, with a roof of Welsh slate at the front and sandstone slate at the rear. There are two storeys and two bays. Some of the windows are mullioned, there is a fire window, and other windows are sashes.	II
Corsica Cottage and adjoining cottages 54.83555°N 2.97488°W	—	Late 17th century	A house and cottages, altered and extended in the 18th and 19th centuries, and later used as outbuildings. The house is in stuccoed sandstone with an extension in brick, and it has a roof of Welsh slate and sandstone slate. There are two storeys and three bays with a single-bay extension. The building to the right is in cobble on a plinth and has sandstone quoins, two storeys and two bays. To the right of this is a single-storey building in rendered clay with some brick. Most of the windows are sashes, some of which are horizontally-sliding, and there are some casement windows. Inside the original house is a pair of full crucks.	II
Green Lane Cottage; 54.84078°N 2.95883°W	—	Late 17th century	A cottage and attached house, the latter dating from the late 18th century. The cottage has clay walls repaired in sandstone, a roof thatched at the front and with corrugated iron at the rear. There is one storey and three bays. It has a stone porch with a sandstone slab roof, and a mullioned window. The house to the left is in sandstone, with quoins and a roof of Welsh slate and sandstone slate. It has two storeys and two bays, and sash windows in stone surrounds. Internally the cottage has a cruck construction, and outside it there is a sandstone mounting block.	II
Hawkesdale Hall; 54.82029°N 2.97476°W	—	Late 17th century	A country house that was extended in 1704. It is rendered on a chamfered plinth, with quoins, a moulded cornice, and a green slate roof. There are three storeys and five bays, with a two-storey three-bay extension to the right. In the centre of the main block is a wooden porch with panelled pilasters and a radial fanlight, and the doorway has a moulded architrave with a pulvinated frieze and a fanlight. The windows in the lower two floors are sashes with moulded cornices, and in the top floor they are horizontally sliding sashes in chamfered surrounds.	II*
Holmhill Farmhouse; 54.81807°N 2.97403°W	—	Late 17th century	The farmhouse is in sandstone on a squared plinth, with quoins and a roof of sandstone and Welsh slate with coped gables. There are two storeys and five bays. The doorway is in an architrave. The ground floor windows are cross-mullioned, in the upper floor they are casements, and there is a sash window above the entrance; all the windows are in architraves.	II
Thwaite Nook; 54.83880°N 2.97370°W	—	Late 17th century	A sandstone farmhouse on a projecting plinth, with quoins and a Welsh slate roof. There are two storeys and four bays, with a single-storey two-bay extension to the right, and a rear outshut. In the extension is a doorway with a chamfered surround. The windows are casements with stone surrounds, and there are also fire windows in chamfered stone surrounds.	II
Nook House and barn 54.78581°N 2.95799°W	—	1689	The farmhouse was extended in the late 18th century. It is in sandstone with a sandstone slate roof, and on the extension is a green slate roof. The original house has two low storeys and four bays, the extension to the left has two storeys and one bay, and the adjoining barn gives the whole an L-shaped plan. The doorway has a chamfered surround, a dated and inscribed lintel, and a carved hood mould. The windows are mullioned, there is a fire window, and at the rear are casement windows. In the extension are sash windows in stone surrounds, and the barn has a projecting cart entrance and ventilation slits.	II
Pinquay's; 54.81915°N 2.94897°W	—	1689	A rendered house, previously a farmhouse, on a plinth of projecting stones, that has a Welsh slate roof with coped gables. There are two storeys and five bays, and an outshut at the rear. On the front is a rendered porch with pilasters and a triangular pediment. The windows are 20th-century casements in stone architraves.	II
Former farmhouse, Raughtonhead Hill Farm; 54.80753°N 2.96685°W	—	1697	Originally a farmhouse, later an outbuilding, it contains earlier material, and was altered in the 19th and 20th centuries. It is in stone, partly rendered, and has a corrugated sheet roof. There are two storeys and three bays. The doorway has a moulded surround, a dated and inscribed lintel, a cornice, and a hood mould. There are further doorways, windows, most of which are mullioned, and a loft entrance.	II
Dovecote, Rose Castle; 54.80647°N 2.97802°W	—	1700	The dovecote is in sandstone on a squared plinth, with quoins, a string course, and a sandstone slate roof with coped gables. It is almost square and has 1 1/2 storeys. There is a chamfered entrance with a dated lintel and oculi above.	II*
Brecon Hill; 54.79379°N 2.97802°W	—	Late 17th or early 18th century	A stuccoed farmhouse on a chamfered plinth, with quoins, and a green slate roof with coped gables. There are two storeys and six bays. The doorway has a bolection-moulded architrave, a cornice on console brackets, and a swan-neck pediment. Most of the windows are sashes with chamfered surrounds, those on the ground floor having moulded cornices. There are also two fire windows, and the window above the doorway is in an architrave.	II
Dalston House; 54.84098°N 2.98579°W	—	17th or 18th century	A building of mixed residential and agricultural use that has been later extended and altered. It is built in rendered sandstone and river cobbles with stone dressings, quoins, and a roof of Lakeland slate. There are two storeys and two bays, the upper floor having been used for domestic purposes. On the front are two doorways on the ground floor and external steps leading to two higher entrances. Also on the front are two smaller rectangular openings.	II
House northeast of Haythwaite; 54.79959°N 2.97247°W	—	Late 17th or early 18th century	The house is in sandstone on projecting plinth stones, and it has a green slate roof. There are two storeys and four bays. The doorway has a chamfered surround. In the ground floor, to the left of the door, are two fire windows flanking a mullioned window. The other windows are a mix of sashes and casements.	II
The Old Vicarage; 54.84260°N 2.98326°W	—	Late 17th or early 18th century	The former vicarage, later a private house, is stuccoed on a chamfered plinth, and has quoins and a green slate roof. There are two storeys with an attic, and three bays, with a two-storey two-bay extension to the right side and rear. The entrance has a Tuscan doorcase with a scrolled entablature, and a round-headed doorway with bolection moulding and a carved leaf keystone. This is flanked by canted bay windows, and in the upper floor are sash windows in architraves.	II
Poplar House; 54.82888°N 3.02236°W	—	1717	A rendered farmhouse that has a Welsh slate roof with coped gables. There are two storeys, five bays, and a single-storey single-bay extension to the left. The doorway has a pilastered doorcase and a shaped hood. The windows are sashes, and there is a canted bay window to the right of the door. In the extension is a plank door and casement windows.	II
Stonethwaite and former barns and byres 54.83770°N 3.02342°W	—	1724	The house and outbuildings are in sandstone and have Welsh slate roofs. The house is on a chamfered plinth, with dressings in calciferous sandstone, quoins, and a shaped eaves cornice. There are two storeys and four bays. The doorway has a bolection-moulded eared architrave, with a dated and inscribed frieze, and a moulded cornice. The windows are sashes in architraves, some of them with three lights, and there are also casement fire windows. The outbuildings, which date from the 18th and 19th centuries, flank the house. To the right is an L-shaped barn, and to the left is a barn with a projecting cart entrance.	II
The Blue Bell; 54.84171°N 2.98372°W	—	Early 18th century	The public house is rendered on a squared plinth and has a green slate roof. There are two storeys, four bays, two doors, sash windows in stone surrounds, and a fire window.	II
Outbuilding, Hawkesdale Hall; 54.82046°N 2.97500°W	—	Early 18th century	Probably originally stables, the outbuilding is in sandstone with a sandstone slate roof. It has one storey, and two bays with shaped gables and ball finials. In the left bay is an entrance converted into a mullioned window, and an oval window above, and in the right bay is a loft entrance. In the left side is an entrance with a chamfered surround.	II
Former stables, Hawkesdale Hall; 54.82021°N 2.97442°W	—	Early 18th century	The former stables are in sandstone with a sandstone slate roof, and have two storeys and four bays. In the centre is a large segmental-arched carriage entrance with a quoined surround. There are flanking entrances, one converted into a window, with quoined surrounds, and casement windows, some mullioned, in chamfered surrounds.	II
House and outbuilding northwest of Hill House; 54.83405°N 2.97732°W	—	Early 18th century (probable)	A farmhouse and outbuilding converted into a private house. It is in rendered sandstone with a roof of sandstone slate repaired with Welsh slate. The house has two storeys and three bays, and the outbuilding is lower. The windows are sashes, there are ventilation slits in the outbuilding, and external stone steps leading to a loft door.	II
Middle Farm and outbuilding 54.82885°N 3.02104°W	—	Early 18th century	The farmhouse and barn, later a private house, are in sandstone on a chamfered plinth, with quoins and a Welsh slate roof. The house has two storeys and three bays, and the barn to the left has a single bay. The doorway has a quoined surround, to its right is a 20th-century casement window, and to the left is a fire window; the other windows are sashes in stone surrounds. In the upper floor is a sundial dated 1756. The former barn has a blocked entrance and ventilation slits. Inside the house is a bressumer.	II
Royal Oak and Royal Oak Cottage; 54.81153°N 2.95364°W	—	Early 18th century (probable)	The former public house is rendered on a plinth, and has a roof of Welsh slate and sandstone slate. The doorway and sash windows have stone surrounds. The house to the right dates from the mid-19th century. It is in stone with quoins, a Welsh slate roof, and casement windows.	II
Townhead and barns 54.82858°N 2.94733°W	—	Early 18th century	A farmhouse in sandstone on a chamfered plinth with quoins, a shaped eaves cornice, and a green slate roof with coped gables. There are two storeys and two bays, and a lower two-storey one-bay extension to the left with a Welsh slate roof. The doorway has a wooden surround and a pointed lintel, and the windows are sashes. The barns are in sandstone with a corrugated asbestos roof, they adjoin the left of the house, and form an L-shaped plan. The barns contain doorways, cart entrances, loft doors, and ventilation slits.	II
Green Lane House; 54.84193°N 2.95966°W	—	1729	The house was extended in the 1850s. It is in sandstone on a chamfered plinth, with quoins, a string course, a moulded eaves cornice, and a green slate roof. There are two storeys and three bays, and a lower two-storey single-bay extension to the left. The doorway has a moulded round-arched surround with a carved leaf keystone, impost blocks, and a cornice on console brackets. The windows are sashes, those in the main part in architraves, and in the extension with stone surrounds.	II
Holm House and barn 54.79425°N 2.98716°W	—	1730	A farmhouse and barn that both have two storeys and green slate roofs. The house is in sandstone with quoins, an eaves cornice, and a roof with coped gables. There are six bays, and a doorway that has a bolection moulded architrave and a segmental pediment containing a date and an inscription. The windows are mullioned in stone architraves under moulded cornices, and there are small fire windows. The barn, lower and with two bays, is in mixed sandstone and cobbles. It has an entrance converted into a window, a cart entrance and, at the rear, mullioned windows and a lead pump.	II
Lime House School; 54.81534°N 2.97158°W		Mid-18th century	Originally a country house, it was altered in about 1810, and again in 1887, and later used as a school. It is built in calciferous sandstone on a chamfered plinth, and has quoins, rendered wings, and a green slate roof. The entrance front has three storeys and seven bays, flanked by L-shaped two-storey, six-bay wings, giving a U-shaped plan. The central bay projects and contains a porch with reeded pilasters and a decorated parapet, a door in an architrave, and a shaped cornice containing a coat of arms. The windows are sashes, those in the middle floor having pedimented cornices, and the top floor is pilastered with a balustraded parapet. In the ground floor of the wings are Venetian windows with Diocletian windows above. At the left is a re-used Ionic porch, and at the rear is a three-storey tower.	II
Pow Bank; 54.84114°N 2.95762°W	—	Mid-18th century	A house built in sandstone and igneous split-cobble headers, with quoins and a green slate roof. There are two storeys, two bays, and a lower two-storey two-bay extension at the rear. The windows are sashes in plain stone surrounds, and there is a 20th-century doorway and a 20th-century porch in the extension.|	II
Raughton Head House; 54.79964°N 2.96574°W	—	Mid-18th century (probable)	The house is built in a mixture of red sandstone and calciferous sandstone, and has quoins and a green slate roof. There are two storeys and three bays, and a single-bay extension to the right. The door and the sash windows are in stone architraves.	II
Outbuilding attached to former farmhouse, Raughtonhead Hill Farm (southwest); 54.80731°N 2.96665°W	—	18th century	A brick building in a single storey with six bays, the fourth bay protruding with quoined corners. There are two tiers of ventilation slits, and a three-bay lean-to outshut. (Note: Street View in March 2010 shows that the building has been converted into residential use.)	II
Outbuilding attached to former farmhouse, Raughtonhead Hill Farm (northwest); 54.80763°N 2.96650°W	—	18th century	The outbuilding was extended and altered in the early 19th and in the 20th century. The older part is in sandstone with a stone slate roof, in four bays, and it contains a tall archway. The later part is at right angles, in brick on a stone plinth, with a corrugated iron roof, and has six bays. It contains a central doorway with a quoined surround and a massive stone lintel. There are also lean-tos, one with two bays and a Welsh slate roof. Other features include further doorways, windows, and ventilation slits.	II
Terrace wall, Rose Castle; 54.80622°N 2.97930°W	—	18th century (probable)	The terrace wall runs along the east side of the garden, outside the curtain wall, and over part of the former moat. It is built in large blocks of sandstone, and there are stepped buttresses at regular intervals along it.	II
Thrangholm Bridge; 54.80516°N 2.95707°W	—	Mid-18th century (probable)	The bridge carries a road over the River Roe. It is in sandstone and consists of a single segmental arch on tapering abutments, and has solid parapets. There is an inscribed stone on a parapet.	II
Barn and byres, Pinquay's; 54.81933°N 2.94914°W	—	1756	Farm buildings in sandstone with sandstone slate roofs, they have two storeys and form a U-shaped plan around three sides of a farmyard. To the left is a doorway in an architrave with a rusticated surround, and a round arch with a keystone. To the right of this is a sash window and a projecting cart entrance. Elsewhere are doorways, one with a dated lintel, loft entrances, and ventilation slits.	II
All Saints Church; 54.80117°N 2.96703°W		1761	The church is in red sandstone and calciferous sandstone on a chamfered plinth, with quoins and a green slate roof with coped gables. It consists of a nave and chancel, a north vestry, and a west tower incorporating a porch that was raised in height in 1881 by C. J. Ferguson. The west entrance and the windows have round heads, and there is a semicircular stair turret on the north side of the tower. At the east end is a Venetian window.	II
Haythwaite; 54.79934°N 2.97278°W	—	1761	A sandstone house, partly rendered, that has a roof of green and Welsh slate with coped gables. There are two storeys, the main part has three bays, and there are lower extensions of two bays and one bay. The door has a rusticated surround and an entablature. The windows in the main part are sashes, and in the extension there are casement windows, and external stone steps leading to a loft door, now blocked.	II
Thethwaite and barn 54.78691°N 2.97435°W	—	1768 (probable)	The farmhouse and adjoining barn are rendered, the house has a green slate roof with coped gables, and the barn has a roof of Welsh slate. The house has two storeys, two bays, and a doorway and sash windows in stone surrounds. Attached to the right is a long barn containing plank doors, a loft door, and ventilation slits.	II
19 The Square; 54.84176°N 2.98440°W	—	Late 18th century	A stuccoed house on a squared plinth with a sandstone slate roof, it has two storeys and two bays. There is a doorway with a stone surround, and a passageway doorway to the left. The windows are sashes in stone surrounds.	II
27 The Square; 54.84219°N 2.98405°W	—	Late 18th century	A house in sandstone on a chamfered plinth, with quoins and a green slate roof. There are three storeys and three bays. It has a Roman Doric doorcase with a fanlight and an open pediment, and the windows are sashes.	II
Beech House and outbuildings 54.79801°N 2.95700°W	—	Late 18th century	The farmhouse and outbuildings are in sandstone. The house is on a chamfered plinth, and has dressings in calciferous sandstone, quoins, and a green slate roof with coped gables. There are two storeys and three bays. The doorway and sash windows have stone surrounds. The lower outbuildings to the left have a roof of Welsh and sandstone slate, they are in two storeys, and have an L-shaped plan. They contain plank doors and ventilation slits.	II
Bridge End Inn; 54.82940°N 2.98142°W		Late 18th century	A public house, stuccoed on a chamfered plinth, with quoins and a slate roof. There are two storeys and three bays. The doorway and the sash windows have stone surrounds.	II
Caldew Bank; 54.82874°N 2.98101°W	—	Late 18th century	The house was extended by the addition of wings in the early 19th century. It is stuccoed on a chamfered plinth, with quoins and a green slate roof. There are two storeys and three bays, flanked by lower two-storey single-bay wings. The doorway is in an eared architrave and has a triangular pediment, and the windows are sashes in stone surrounds. There is a tall round-headed stair window at the rear.	II
Byres and barn, Cardew Hall; 54.83957°N 3.01397°W	—	Late 18th century (probable)	The farm buildings are in sandstone, with a roof of Welsh slate at the front and sandstone slabs at the rear. They form a long two-storey building, and contain plank doors and loft entrances. At the rear is a polygonal gin gang.	II
Cardew House; 54.83503°N 3.02840°W	—	Late 18th century	A sandstone farmhouse on a chamfered plinth, with dressings in calciferous sandstone, quoins, a string course, a pedimented dentilled cornice, and a roof of green and Welsh slate, hipped on the wings. There are two storeys, and three bays, with lower flanking two-storey two-bay wings. The central doorway has a pilastered surround, a fanlight, and a pediment, and there are doorways with plain surrounds in the wings. The windows are sashes in plain surrounds, those in the outer bays of the central block being tripartite.	II
Chapel House; 54.80085°N 2.96699°W	—	Late 18th century	A sandstone house on a chamfered plinth, with quoins and a green slate roof. There are two storeys and two bays, with a lower two-bay extension to the left. The former main entrance has been converted into a French window; it has a quoined surround and a keyed entablature. There is a 20th-century porch in the extension, and the windows are sashes in stone surrounds.	II
Church Farmhouse; 54.84187°N 2.98337°W	—	Late 18th century	A sandstone house on a chamfered plinth, with quoins and a green slate roof with a coped gable to the right. There are two storeys and three bays. The doorway and sash windows are in architraves, and above the door is a cornice.	II
Church House; 54.84198°N 2.98327°W	—	Late 18th century	The house is in sandstone on a chamfered plinth, and it has quoins and a green slate roof, hipped on the left. There are two storeys and two bays. The doorway has a quoined surround and a keyed entablature. To the right is a carriage entrance, and the windows are sashes in architraves.	II
Church View; 54.84155°N 2.98449°W	—	Late 18th century	A pair of stuccoed houses on a squared plinth with a sandstone slate roof. There are two storeys, and each house has two bays, with a lean-to porch to the left. The doorways and sash windows have painted stone surrounds.	II
Country Kitchen; 54.84175°N 2.98357°W	—	Late 18th century	Originally a public house, later a house and a restaurant, it is in calciferous sandstone on a chamfered plinth, with quoins, a moulded cornice, and a Welsh slate roof. There are two storeys and five bays. The two doorways have fanlights in pilastered surrounds with round moulded arches, and the windows are sashes in stone surrounds. To the right is a carriage arch with a quoined surround.	II
Gaitsgill Hall; 54.81262°N 2.95298°W	—	Late 18th century	A rendered farmhouse that has a Welsh slate roof with coped gables. There are two storeys and three bays. The doorway and sash windows have stone surrounds.	II
Barn, Poplar House; 54.82877°N 3.02266°W	—	Late 18th century	The barn is in sandstone with a roof of sandstone slate repaired with Welsh slate. It has an L-shaped plan, and contains a cart entrance and ventilation slits.	II
Raughton Farmhouse; 54.82017°N 2.94969°W	—	Late 18th century	A sandstone farmhouse on a chamfered plinth, with quoins, and a green slate roof with coped gables. There are two storeys and four bays. The doorway has a pilastered surround, a patterned fanlight, and a moulded cornice. The windows are sashes in stone surrounds, those flanking the doorway being double.	II
14 The Square; 54.84140°N 2.98450°W	—	Late 18th century	Originally a public house, then a library, and following that a pair of houses. They are stuccoed on a squared plinth with a roof of sandstone and Welsh slate and with a coped gable on the right. There are two storeys, and each building has three bays. The doorways and sash windows have plain surrounds.	II
Fieldhead; 54.78903°N 2.97076°W	—	1782	A stone farmhouse on a chamfered plinth, with quoins and a green slate roof with coped gables. There are two storeys and three bays, with a lower single-bay extension to the right. The doorway has a quoined surround and a keyed inscribed and dated entablature, and the windows are sashes in stone surrounds.	II
Wythmoor House and barns 54.79708°N 2.95536°W	—	1783	The house is rendered over a chamfered plinth, and has quoins and a green slate roof. There are two storeys, two bays, and a single-bay extension to the left. The doorway has an eared architrave with a reeded entablature, a cornice with a date panel, and a dentilled pediment. The windows are sashes in stone surrounds. At the rear is a 19th-century two-bay extension continuing as a barn. The barn contains a cart entrance, vented openings, and external stone steps to a loft door.	II
3 The Square; 54.84184°N 2.98341°W	—	Late 18th or early 19th century	A sandstone house with a Welsh slate roof. It has two storeys and two bays. The doorway and the sash windows have stone surrounds.	II
Dover House; 54.84198°N 2.98423°W	—	Late 18th or early 19th century	The house is in sandstone interspersed with whinstone, on a plinth, with sandstone dressings, quoins on the right, an eaves cornice, and a blue slate roof. There are two storeys and two bays. Steps lead up to the doorway that has alternating jambs to the right, voussoirs, and a keystone. To the left is an elliptical-arched carriage entrance also with voussoirs, and a keystone, and to the right is an oriel bow window. In the upper floor are sash windows in architraves, and in the roof is a flat-roofed dormer.	II
Dalston Bridge; 54.83287°N 2.98287°W		1812	The bridge carries a road over the River Caldew. It is in sandstone, and consists of three segmental arches with pointed cutwaters. The bridge has a string course and a solid parapet. There are oval inscribed stones on both sides.	II
1 and 2 The Green; 54.84047°N 2.98450°W	—	1815	Originally a grammar school, later converted into two houses, it is in sandstone with quoins and a hipped green slate roof. There is one storey and five bays. The windows are casements in stone surrounds, and flanking the central windows are inscribed plaques.	II
Boundary stone 54.79421°N 2.94113°W	—	Early 19th century (probable)	The stone marked the boundary between parishes, and was moved from its original position in 1975. It is in sandstone, and consists of a squared stone with a pyramidal top inscribed with the names of the townships on the front and the side.	II
Chilterns; 54.83789°N 2.98438°W	—	Early 19th century	A sandstone house on a pointed plinth, with quoins and a green slate roof. There are two storeys and three bays. The doorway has a radial fanlight in a pilastered surround with a false keystone, and the windows are sashes with stone surrounds.	II
Flanders; 54.84239°N 2.96550°W	—	Early 19th century	A rendered farmhouse with a green slate roof. It has two storeys and two bays. The door and sash windows are in painted stone surrounds.	II
High Bridge; 54.78565°N 2.94295°W	—	Early 19th century	The bridge carries a road over the River Roe. It is in sandstone, and consists of a single segmental arch with a humped carriageway. There are two string courses and a parapet with chamfered coping.	II
Rose Bridge; 54.80415°N 2.97412°W		Early 19th century	A road bridge crossing the River Caldew, it is built in red sandstone and calciferous sandstone. The bridge consists of three segmental arches on piers with splayed cutwaters, a string course, and a solid parapet. There are projections over each pier acting as pedestrian refuges.	II
Stockdalewath Bridge; 54.79640°N 2.95386°W		Early 19th century	The bridge carries a road over the River Roe. It is in sandstone, and consists of a single segmental arch with a string course and a solid parapet.	II
Thackwood; 54.78421°N 2.95475°W	—	Early 19th century	The house incorporates part of a house dated 1681. It is rendered on a squared plinth and has a green slate roof. There are two storeys and five bays. The doorway has a roll moulded surround and an inscribed and dated lintel. The windows in the ground floor date from the 19th century, there are mullioned windows above, all with hood moulds, and in the roof is a gabled dormer.	II
The Willows; 54.83949°N 2.98466°W	—	Early 19th century	A sandstone house on a plinth, with quoins and a green slate roof. There are two storeys and three bays. The doorway has a patterned fanlight and an open pediment, and the windows are sashes in stone surrounds.	II
Forge Green; 54.83176°N 2.98196°W	—	c. 1828	This was built as a workhouse and was later used as offices and dwellings. It is in sandstone with quoins, stone dressings, and a roof of Westmorland slate. There are two storeys, four bays, and a single-bay projecting wing. The door has a quoined surround, and most of the windows are sashes, with casement windows in the wing. The building stands in a garden surrounded by a sandstone wall that has gate piers with shallow pyramidal caps. Incorporated in the wall is a long single-storey building and a pair of earth closets.	II
Green Park; 54.84196°N 2.95952°W	—	1829	A sandstone house on a chamfered plinth, with dressings in calciferous sandstone, quoins, a moulded eaves cornice, and a hipped green slate roof. There are two storeys and three bays, with a recessed two-storey two-bay extension to the right. The doorway has a pilastered surround, a radial fanlight, and a false keystone. The windows are sashes in stone surrounds.	II
Stables and barn, Green Lane House; 54.84195°N 2.96003°W	—	1830	The building was extended in about 1850. It is in sandstone with quoins and a hipped green slate roof. It is a long building in two storeys with a stable extension to the left. There is a large projecting cart entrance, plank doors, loft doors, and other openings.	II
Caldew House; 54.84278°N 2.98296°W	—	Mid-19th century	A sandstone house with quoins and a Welsh slate roof. There are two storeys, a central recessed block of two bays, flanked by two-bay gabled wings. The house has a gabled porch, and sash windows in stone surrounds.	II
Farm outbuilding north-northwest of Raughtonhead Hill Farmhouse; 54.80735°N 2.96609°W	—	Mid-19th century	A sandstone building with a Welsh slate roof, in a single storey and with six bays. The first two bays contain full-height doorways, the next bay is a former brewhouse that has a door with a quoined surround, and the other three bays have doorways and wall-troughs.	II
Cardew Lodge; 54.83252°N 3.03328°W		1870s	A house that was extended in 1889 by and for the architect C. J. Ferguson. It is in red sandstone and calciferous sandstone with quoins, and has roofs of green slate and sandstone slate. There are two storeys and three bays, a single-storey single-bay extension to the left, and a two-storey four-bay extension at the rear on the right, giving an L-shaped plan. On the front is a recessed entrance with a chamfered surround, above which is a dated panel. Some windows are mullioned, and others are casements. On the garden front is a canted bay window, and at the end is a circular two-storey battlemented turret.	II
Threshing mill 54.81496°N 2.99714°W	—	Late 19th century	The mill is in sandstone with quoins and a Westmorland slate roof. It has three storeys and five bays, and a linear plan. The mill contains an internal wheelhouse with a wheelpit, and an undershot water wheel.	II
Village Hall and Primrose Cottage; 54.81244°N 2.95326°W	—	1885	The village hall is flanked by a house on each side. The buildings are rendered and have green slate roofs. The village hall has one storey and two bays, with a central protruding sandstone porch. The porch has a doorway with a chamfered pointed surround, a hood mould, and a fanlight, and above it is a shaped gable containing an inscribed plaque. On the sides of the porch are small lancet windows, and flanking the porch are casement windows with pointed heads and hood moulds. The houses are similar to each other, with two storeys and two bays, doors and sash windows in stone surrounds, and hood moulds.	II
Garden wall, Cardew Lodge; 54.83211°N 3.03276°W	—	1889	The wall runs along the east side of the garden. It is in red sandstone and calciferous sandstone, and has stepped buttresses, arrow slits, and a battlemented parapet.	II
Gateway and outbuildings, Cardew Lodge; 54.83234°N 3.03268°W	—	1889	The buildings are in mixed red sandstone and calciferous sandstone. The gateway consists of two circular two-storey towers and a rounded archway, all battlemented. The towers have pointed entrances, lancet windows, and hood moulds. The left tower has been used as a gardener's cottage, and there are outbuildings adjoining the right tower.	II
Lodge, Cardew Lodge; 54.83042°N 3.03119°W		1889	The former lodge to Cardew Lodge is in mixed red sandstone and calciferous sandstone, and has string courses and a green slate roof. It consists of a circular two-storey tower and a lower two-storey single-bay wing to the right. The doorway has a Tudor arch and a hood mould, and there is a cross slit vent. The windows are casements, those in the wing having chamfered stone surrounds, and those in the tower having lancet openings and hood moulds. There are small attic openings below the eaves.	II
Coronation seat 54.84098°N 2.98409°W		1911	The seat, on the village green, commemorates the coronation of George V. It has an octagonal plinth and an octagonal back rest in red sandstone ashlar, and a seat covered with wooden laths. Around it is an iron superstructure.	II
Cumdivock war memorial 54.82926°N 3.03138°W	—	1919	The war memorial is in the churchyard of St John's Church, Cumdivock. It consists of a Latin cross in copper tubing on an octagonal oak shaft, an octagonal sandstone plinth, and a three-tiered octagonal stone base. On the shaft are four carved shields, and on the plinth is a slate panel with inscriptions and the names of those lost in the two World Wars.	II
Dalston war memorial 54.84211°N 2.98375°W		1920	The war memorial stands near the lych gate at the entrance to the churchyard of St Michael's Church. It is in granite, and consists of a wheel-head cross on a square plinth with a tapering cap, and is about 3.5 metres (11 ft) high. The cross-head and upper part of the shaft are decorated with strapwork carving, in the lower part of the shaft is an inscription and the names of those lost in the First World War, and on the reverse is another inscription and the names of those lost in the Second World War.	II

== Notes and references ==
=== Sources ===
- Historic England, "Church of St Michael and all Angels, Dalston (1374153)", National Heritage List for England
- Historic England, "Rose Castle, Dalston (1087473)", National Heritage List for England
- Historic England, "Curtain walls surrounding Rose Castle, Dalston (1054869)", National Heritage List for England
- Historic England, "Dalston Hall NY 376515, Dalston (1087441)", National Heritage List for England
- Historic England, "Cardew Hall, Dalston (1055827)", National Heritage List for England
- Historic England, "Gate with flanking lodge and tower, to north of Rose Castle, Dalston (1335662)", National Heritage List for England
- Historic England, "Nos. 25 and 26 The Square, Dalston (1392399)", National Heritage List for England
- Historic England, "Fountain Head and adjoining barn, Dalston (1366626)", National Heritage List for England
- Historic England, "Hudbeck and adjoining outbuildings, Dalston (1087470)", National Heritage List for England
- Historic England, "The Gill, Dalston (1335646)", National Heritage List for England
- Historic England, "The Oaks, Dalston (1087444)", National Heritage List for England
- Historic England, "Brackenhow NY 376485, Dalston (1045821)", National Heritage List for England
- Historic England, "Roewath NY 388445, Dalston (1335671)", National Heritage List for England
- Historic England, "Red Spears, Dalston (1087472)", National Heritage List for England
- Historic England, "Corsica Cottage and adjoining cottages, Dalston (1087434)", National Heritage List for England
- Historic England, "Green Lane Cottage, Dalston (1087467)", National Heritage List for England
- Historic England, "Hawkesdale Hall, Dalston (1335649)", National Heritage List for England
- Historic England, "Holmhill Farmhouse, Dalston (1345541)", National Heritage List for England
- Historic England, "Thwaite Nook, Dalston (1087433)", National Heritage List for England
- Historic England, "Nook House and adjoining barn, Dalston (1087471)", National Heritage List for England
- Historic England, "Pinquay's, Dalston (1087447)", National Heritage List for England
- Historic England, "Farm outbuilding, formerly Farmhouse 35 Metres North-West of Raughtonhead Hill Farmhouse, Dalston (1247865)", National Heritage List for England
- Historic England, "Dovecote to northeast of Rose Castle, Dalston (1087474)", National Heritage List for England
- Historic England, "Brecon Hill, Dalston (1087466)", National Heritage List for England
- Historic England, "First floor dwelling with agricultural ground floor, Dalston (1421404)", National Heritage List for England
- Historic England, "House immediately north-east of Haythwaite, Dalston (1087451)", National Heritage List for England
- Historic England, "The Old Vicarage, Dalston (1366606)", National Heritage List for England
- Historic England, "Poplar House, Dalston (1055815)", National Heritage List for England
- Historic England, "Stonethwaite and adjoining former barns and byres, Dalston (1087438)", National Heritage List for England
- Historic England, "The Blue Bell, Dalston (1087453)", National Heritage List for England
- Historic England, "Outbuilding to northwest of Hawkesdale Hall, Dalston (1057697)", National Heritage List for England
- Historic England, "Former stables to south-east of Hawkesdale Hall, Dalston (1087445)", National Heritage List for England
- Historic England, "Unnamed house and outbuilding to northwest of Hill House, Dalston (1335681)", National Heritage List for England
- Historic England, "Middle Farm and adjoining outbuilding, Dalston (1055796)", National Heritage List for England
- Historic England, "Royal Oak and Royal Oak Cottage, Dalston (1087442)", National Heritage List for England
- Historic England, "Townhead and adjoining barns NY 392486, Dalston (1087413)", National Heritage List for England
- Historic England, "Green Lane House, Dalston (1087468)", National Heritage List for England
- Historic England, "Holm House and adjoining barn, Dalston (1054920)", National Heritage List for England
- Historic England, "Lime House School, Dalston (1087446)", National Heritage List for England
- Historic England, "Pow Bank, Dalston (1054878)", National Heritage List for England
- Historic England, "Raughton Head House, Dalston (1039114)", National Heritage List for England
- Historic England, "Farm outbuilding attached to South-West Gable of Outbuilding, formerly Farmhouse 35 Metres North-West of Raughtonhead Hill Farmhouse, Dalston (1087420)", National Heritage List for England
- Historic England, "Farm outbuilding attached to North-East Gable of Outbuilding, formerly Farmhouse 35 Metres North-West of Raughtonhead Hill Farmhouse, Dalston (1335675)", National Heritage List for England
- Historic England, "Terrace wall to east of Rose Castle, Dalston (1367048)", National Heritage List for England
- Historic England, "Thrangholm Bridge NY 385460, Dalston (1335663)", National Heritage List for England
- Historic England, "Barn and byres adjoining to northeast of Pinquay's, Dalston (1057683)", National Heritage List for England
- Historic England, "Church of All Saints, Dalston (1345594)", National Heritage List for England
- Historic England, "Haythwaite, Dalston (1087450)", National Heritage List for England
- Historic England, "Thethwaite and adjoining barn, Dalston (1087475)", National Heritage List for England
- Historic England, "No. 19 The Square, Dalston (1087410)", National Heritage List for England
- Historic England, "No. 27 The Square, Dalston (1087411)", National Heritage List for England
- Historic England, "Beech House and adjoining outbuildings, Dalston (1335670)", National Heritage List for England
- Historic England, "Bridge End Inn, Dalston (1087432)", National Heritage List for England
- Historic England, "Caldew Bank, Dalston (1335680)", National Heritage List for England
- Historic England, "Byres and barn adjoining to north of Cardew Hall, Dalston (1335645)", National Heritage List for England
- Historic England, "Cardew House, Dalston (1335644)", National Heritage List for England
- Historic England, "Chapel House, Dalston (1087449)", National Heritage List for England
- Historic England, "Church Farmhouse, Dalston (1374148)", National Heritage List for England
- Historic England, "Church House, Dalston (1335650)", National Heritage List for England
- Historic England, "Church View, Dalston (1038532)", National Heritage List for England
- Historic England, "Country Kitchen, Dalston (1374223)", National Heritage List for England
- Historic England, "Gaitsgill Hall, Dalston (1335647)", National Heritage List for England
- Historic England, "Barn to west of Poplar House, Dalston (1087440)", National Heritage List for England
- Historic England, "Raughton Farmhouse, Dalston (1087448)", National Heritage List for England
- Historic England, "No. 14 The Square, Dalston (1335651)", National Heritage List for England
- Historic England, "Fieldhead, Dalston (1335661)", National Heritage List for England
- Historic England, "Wythmoor House and adjoining barns, Dalston (1087412)", National Heritage List for England
- Historic England, "No. 3 The Square, Dalston (1087452)", National Heritage List for England
- Historic England, "Dover House, Dalston (1038340)", National Heritage List for England
- Historic England, "Dalston Bridge, Dalston (1366595)", National Heritage List for England
- Historic England, "Nos. 1 and 2 The Green, Dalston (1335648)", National Heritage List for England
- Historic England, "Boundary stone on the Ivegill road southeast of Stockdalewath, Dalston (1374529)", National Heritage List for England
- Historic England, "Chilterns, Dalston (1366620)", National Heritage List for England
- Historic England, "Flanders NY 380501, Dalston (1045827)", National Heritage List for England
- Historic England, "High Bridge, Dalston (1392916)", National Heritage List for England
- Historic England, "Rose Bridge, Dalston (1054879)", National Heritage List for England
- Historic England, "Stockdalewath Bridge, Dalston (1038311)", National Heritage List for England
- Historic England, "Thackwood, Dalston (1054813)", National Heritage List for England
- Historic England, "The Willows, Dalston (1087443)", National Heritage List for England
- Historic England, "Forge Green (former workhouse), Dalston (1390515)", National Heritage List for England
- Historic England, "Green Park, Dalston (1087469)", National Heritage List for England
- Historic England, "Stables and barn to west of Green Lane House, Dalston (1045805)", National Heritage List for England
- Historic England, "Caldew House, Dalston (1087439)", National Heritage List for England
- Historic England, "Farm outbuilding North North-West of Raughtonhead Hill Farmhouse, Dalston (1263922)", National Heritage List for England
- Historic England, "Cardew Lodge, Dalston (1087435)", National Heritage List for England
- Historic England, "Threshing mill, Dalston (1350376)", National Heritage List for England
- Historic England, "Village Hall and Primrose Cottage, Dalston (1366618)", National Heritage List for England
- Historic England, "Garden wall to southeast of Cardew Lodge, Dalston (1087436)", National Heritage List for England
- Historic England, "Gardener's Cottage, adjoining gateway, outbuildings, to east of Cardew Lodge, Dalston (1335682)", National Heritage List for England
- Historic England, "Lodge southeast of Cardew Lodge, Dalston (1087437)", National Heritage List for England
- Historic England, "Coronation seat, Dalston (1055748)", National Heritage List for England
- Historic England, "Cumdivock War Memorial, Dalston (1457978)", National Heritage List for England
- Historic England, "Dalston War Memorial, Dalston (1458513)", National Heritage List for England
- Historic England, Listed Buildings
- Hyde, Matthew; Pevsner, Nikolaus (2010) [1967], Cumbria, The Buildings of England, New Haven and London: Yale University Press, ISBN 978-0-300-12663-1
