= Cumdivock =

Hamlet in Cumbria, England

Coordinates: 54.828°N 3.022°W

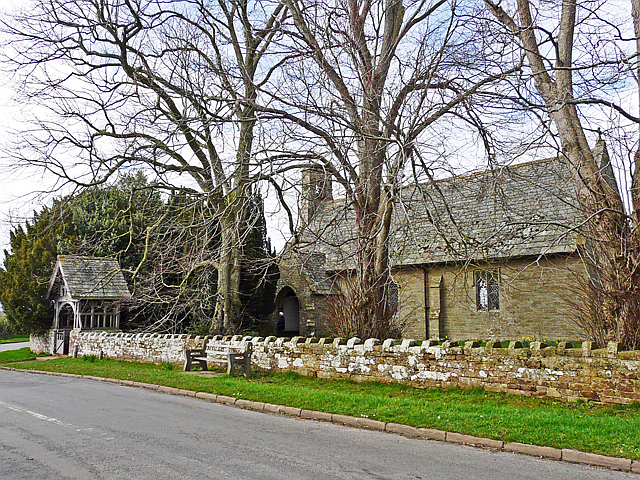
- St John's Church, Cumdivock

- Location in the former Carlisle district, Cumbria Location within Cumbria
- OS grid reference: NY343486
- Civil parish: Dalston
- Unitary authority: Cumberland
- Ceremonial county: Cumbria
- Region: North West
- Country: England
- Sovereign state: United Kingdom
- Post town: CARLISLE
- Postcode district: CA5
- Dialling code: 01228
- Police: Cumbria
- Fire: Cumbria
- Ambulance: North West
- UK Parliament: Carlisle

Cumdivock is a village in Cumbria, England nestled between neighbouring hamlets of Cardew and Gill.

Ian Caruana unearthed several 17th-century Tyneside clay pipes at Cumdivock.

John Denton (c.1560–1613), antiquarian and historian, was born at Cardew Hall near Cumdivock, the same house later associated with the poet Susanna Blamire. In the first decade of the seventeenth century he compiled what is recognised as the earliest known history of Cumberland, a work that formed the foundation of much subsequent antiquarian writing on the county for over two centuries.His manuscript history, documenting the principal estates, families, and historical traditions of Cumberland, was widely copied and circulated, remaining an important source for later historians and genealogists. Denton's work represents one of the earliest county histories produced in England and continues to be cited by scholars studying the history of Cumberland and its landed families. A modern critical edition of his history, reconstructing the original text and examining its sources, was published in 2010 under the title The History of the County of Cumberland by John Denton.

Susanna Blamire (1747–1794), often known as the “Muse of Cumberland”, was born at Cardew Hall just outside Cumdivock itself, her best-known longer work, Stoklewath, or The Cumbrian Village, draws heavily on the rural landscape, customs, and agricultural life of the district around Cumdivock and neighbouring settlements, suggesting that the local countryside formed part of its descriptive setting. Susanna was the Auntie of William Blamire, a gentleman farmer who campaigned against Tithes.

Robert Anderson (1770–1833), one of Cumberland’s best-known dialect poets, referred to Cumdivock in his dialect poem Sally Gray, writing: “There's Cumwhitton, Cumwhinton, Cumranton, Cumrangen, Cumrew, and Cumcatch, And mony mair cum's i' the county, But nin wi' Cumdivock can match; It's sae neyce to luik owre the black pasture, Wi' the fells abuin aw, far away—There is nee sec pleace, nit in England, For there lives the Sweet Sally Gray!”. In the same verse he praises the surrounding view of “the black pasture” and distant fells, using the village as part of his portrayal of rural courtship and everyday life in north Cumberland. His verse helped preserve local speech and place-names in early nineteenth-century literature.

One of the most significant historic features associated with Cumdivock is Shawk (or Chalk) Quarry, located to the south‑west of the settlement. This limestone quarry is of national archaeological importance, having been worked in the Roman period. A well‑known Roman quarry inscription of the Second Legion Augusta was recorded here in the eighteenth century, confirming that stone was extracted by Roman soldiers, likely for major construction works in the Carlisle area and possibly for sections of Hadrian’s Wall. The quarry continued to be worked in later centuries, supplying high‑quality freestone for regional building projects, and quarrying in Cumdivock formed part of the local economy well into the nineteenth century.

Running through land to the north and west of Cumdivock is the line of the Bishop’s Dyke, a substantial early medieval earthwork now protected as a Scheduled Monument. The dyke comprises a bank and double ditch and is generally understood to have marked land belonging to the bishops of Carlisle, whose principal seat was at nearby Rose Castle. Documentary and archaeological evidence indicates that the dyke functioned both as a territorial boundary and as a defensive feature, particularly during periods of cross‑border conflict. Surviving sections are traceable through woods, pasture, and field boundaries, near to Dalston Hall. Bellgate house was likely a gate in this boundary which continued from Cumdivock to Shawk Beck before terminating on its steep banks. Bellgate House, located close to the line of the Bishop’s Dyke, takes its name from the historic “Bellgate” through which the dyke once passed. While the present house is of later construction, its position preserves the historic significance of this crossing point, where a gateway through the medieval boundary earthwork was recorded in documentary sources. The surrounding field boundaries and track alignments still reflect the influence of the dyke on the local landscape and movement routes.

Cumdivock is home to a number of listed historic buildings including, Middle Farm, Poplar House, The Gill, Cardew Farmhouse, Cardew Hall, Cardew House & Cardew Lodge.

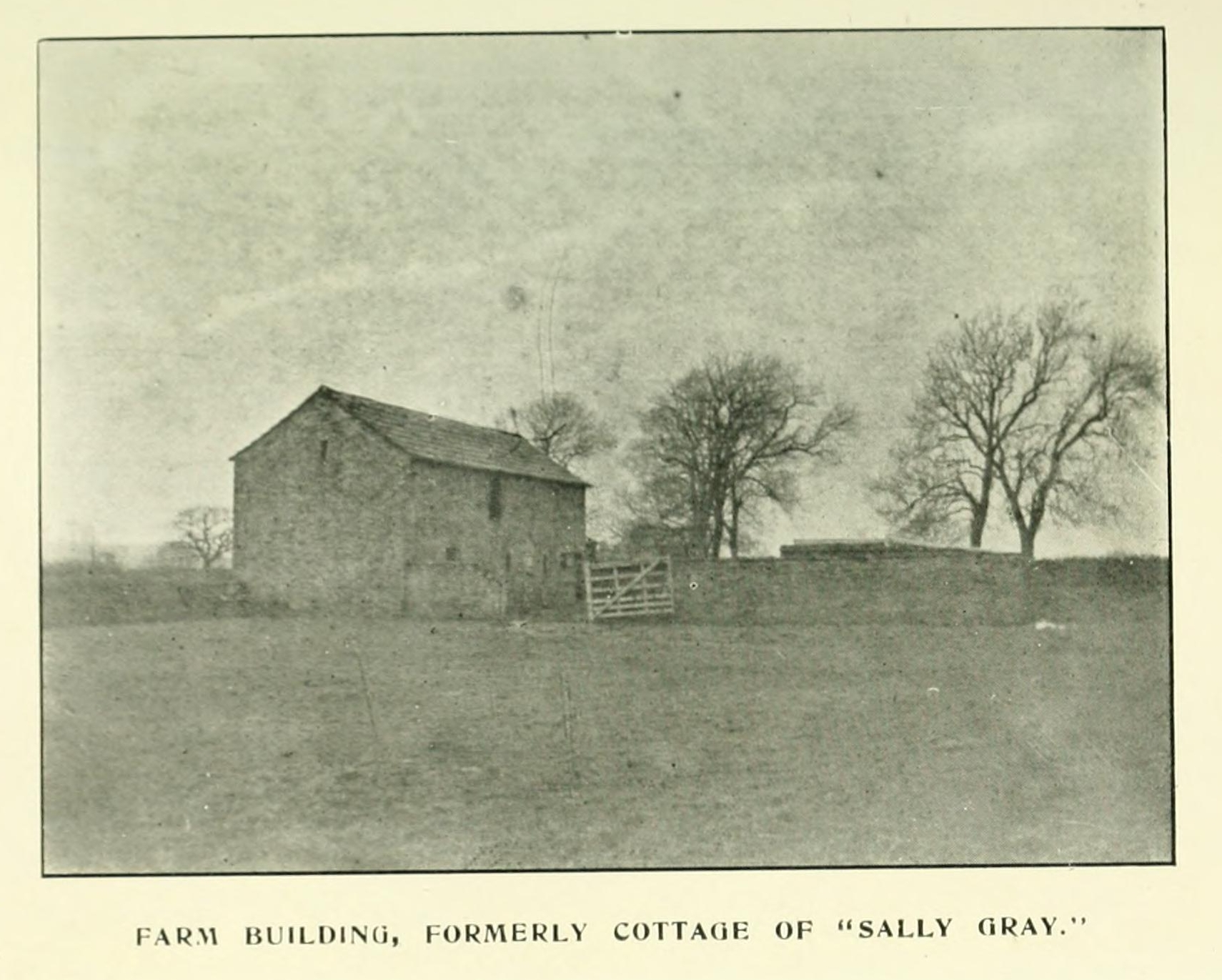
Farm Building in Cumdivock, Formerly Cottage of "Sally Gray"

St John’s Church, Cumdivock (also known as Cumdivock Church), is a Church of England place of worship dedicated to St John, located in the localities of Cumdivock and Chalkfoot within the civil parish of Dalston, Cumbria (formerly Cumberland), at OS grid reference NY33864876. The church is recorded on early twentieth‑century mapping, including the 1918 map by Rev. Euston J. Nurse and later diocesan maps published in 1939. It forms part of the Diocese of Carlisle and is noted in the Diocese of Carlisle Directory 2004/5. The building and its setting include a lychgate (with surviving plans dating from 1905), historic bells, stained glass, and scriptural inscriptions. The church contains an organ by James Conacher & Sons of Huddersfield, and a porch notice records a £30 grant made in 1870 by the Incorporated Society for Building Churches, on the condition that all sittings be free and allocated according to law.
