= Stockdalewath =

Village in Cumbria, England

Coordinates: 54.795°N 2.955°W

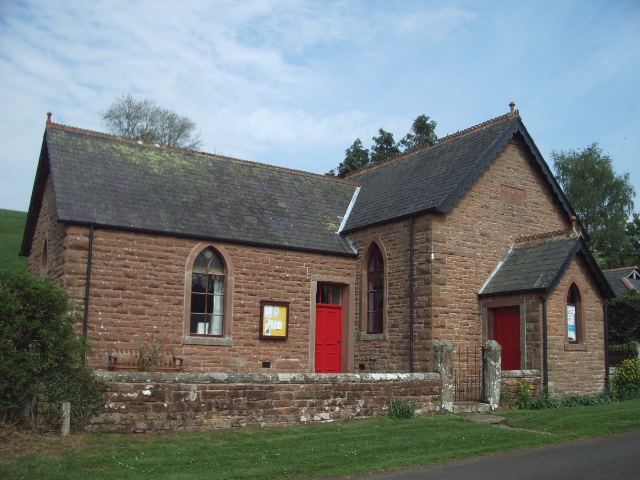
- The Stockdalewath Methodist Church

- Location in the former Carlisle district, Cumbria Location within Cumbria
- Population: 74
- OS grid reference: NY385445
  - London: 257 mi (414 km) SSE
- Civil parish: Dalston
- Unitary authority: Cumberland
- Ceremonial county: Cumbria
- Region: North West
- Country: England
- Sovereign state: United Kingdom
- Post town: CARLISLE
- Postcode district: CA5
- Dialling code: 01228
- Police: Cumbria
- Fire: Cumbria
- Ambulance: North West
- UK Parliament: Carlisle

Stockdalewath is a small village in the ceremonial county of Cumbria, but in the historic county of Cumberland, approximately 7.5 miles south of Carlisle in the extreme northwest of England. It is located on the River Roe, and is in the civil parish of Dalston.

As of the 2011 census, the population is estimated to be 74.

Archaeological evidence, mostly based on aerial surveys of crop marks, suggests that Stockdalewath was a rural settlement in Roman Cumbria. Within a half mile of the village are three camps thought to be Roman, with the names Castlesteads, Stoneraise, and Whitestones. They are equal distance from each other and form a triangle.

== Notable people ==
- Susanna Blamire, poet known as The Muse of Cumberland; raised in Stockdalewath

== See also ==
- Listed buildings in Dalston, Cumbria

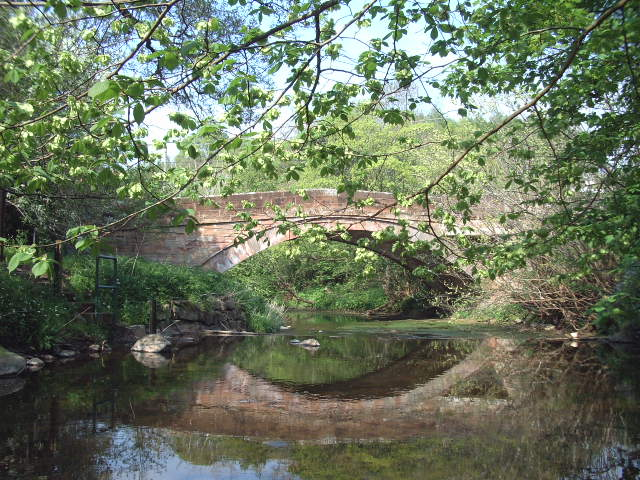
The Stockdalewath Bridge, spanning the River Roe

== Sources ==
- Higham, N.J.; Jones, G.D.B. (1985). The Carvetii. Peoples of Roman Britain. Stroud: Alan Sutton. pp. xiii, 1–158. ISBN 0862990882.
- Shotter, David (2004). Romans and Britons in North-West England (3rd ed.). Lancaster: Centre for North-West Regional Studies, University of Lancaster. pp. xii, 204. ISBN 1862201528.
