= Cardew Lodge =

Country house in Cumbria, England

Coordinates: 54.8326°N 3.0335°W

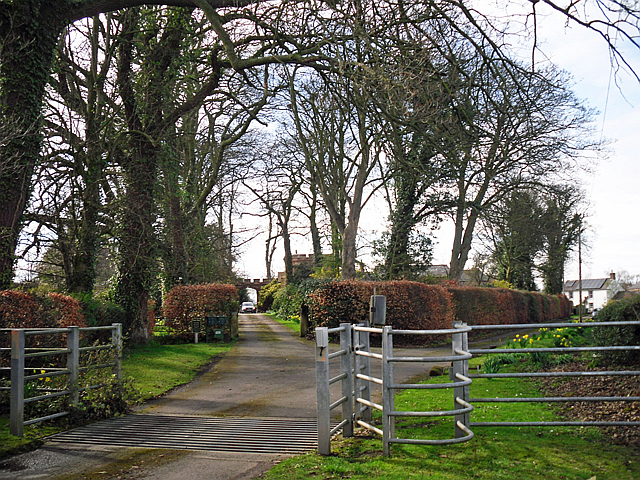
Cattle grid on road approaching Cardew Lodge

Cardew Lodge is a country house at Cardew near Thursby in Cumbria. It is a Grade II listed building.

== History ==
The house was built as a hunting lodge for Major-General William Henry Lowther following his retirement from the Bengal Army in the late 1870s. The house has "single-storey gabled wings reminiscent of an Indian bungalow, which he stuffed with mementos of his time in Bengal, including the skin of a crocodile shot after it had eaten a man, and he planted rhododendrons and azaleas in his garden."

The house was acquired by C. J. Ferguson, an architect, who designed and commissioned additions in 1889. In addition to the turreted tower which is built into the house, it has twin towers on the drive up to the house. It became the retirement home of Barbara Dunn, the first British licensed radio operator, after the Second World War and then became the home of the Mallinson family in 1980.

== See also ==
- Listed buildings in Dalston, Cumbria
