= Cardew House =

Country house in Cumbria, England

Coordinates: 54.8397°N 3.0135°W

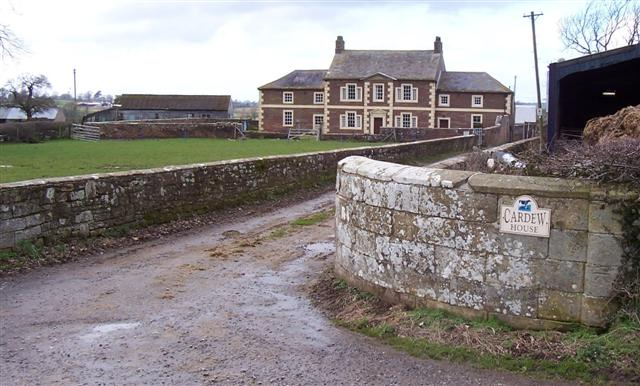
Cardew House

Cardew House is a country house at Cardew near Thursby in Cumbria. It is a Grade II listed building.

== History ==
The house, originally known as Cardew Hall, was built in the early 16th century for the Denton family and was the birthplace of John Denton, a Cumberland historian, in 1561. It was acquired by Sir John Lowther, a politician, in 1686 and was also the birthplace of Susanna Blamire, a poet, in 1747. By 1790 the house had been acquired by Edward Trimble who farmed Broadmoor and Green Lane as well as Cardew Hall. Kenneth Smith, writing in the 1970s, identified it as a country house of note in his book Cumbrian Villages. The house, which is now owned by Robert Potter, continues to be used as a farmhouse.
