= Susanna Blamire =

English poet (1747–1794)

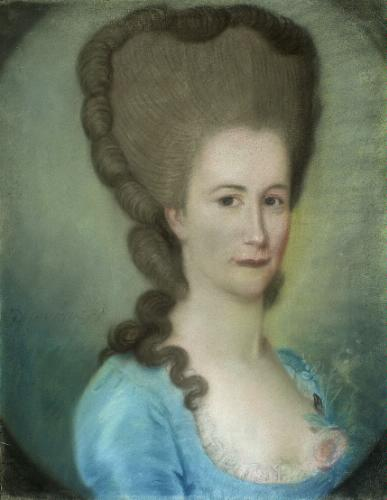
- Born: 12 January 1747; Cardew Hall, Cardew, Cumberland
- Died: 1794 (aged 46–47)
- Occupation: Poet
- Writing career
- Notable works: 'Stoklewath, or The Cumbrian Village'; 'And ye shall walk in silk attire'
- Literary movement: Romanticism

Susanna Blamire (12 January 1747 – 1794) was an English Romantic poet, sometimes known as 'The Muse of Cumberland' because many of her poems represent rural life in the county and, therefore, provide a valuable contradistinction to those amongst the poems of William Wordsworth that regard the same subject, in addition to those of the other Lake Poets, especially those of Samuel Taylor Coleridge, and in addition to those of Lord Byron, on whose The Prisoner of Chillon her works may have had an influence. Blamire composed much of her poetry outside, sitting beside a stream in her garden at Thackwood. She also played the guitar and the flageolet, both of which she used in the process of the composition of her poetry.

Blamire has been described as 'unquestionably the greatest female poet of [the Romantic] age' and, by Jonathan Wordsworth, a great-nephew of William Wordsworth, 'as important as the other Romantic poets writing during the eighteenth century'.

Blamire's song 'And Ye shall walk in silk attire', referenced by Charles Dickens in The Old Curiosity Shop is well known. Her magnum opus is Stoklewath, or The Cumbrian Village.

== Life ==
Blamire was born at Cardew Hall, near Cardew, Cumberland, on 12 January 1747. Her parents were William Blamire, a farmer who died in 1758, and Isabella Simpson of Stockdalewath who died in 1753. Left an orphan, she went to live with her mother's sister Mary who farmed at Thackwood, Stockdalewath. She was educated at the Dame school at Raughton Head, before being privately tutored, at home, by masters from the Sebergham Grammar School, where the poet Joseph Relph had been Headmaster.

=== Social milieu ===
Her brother William, who married to a sister of John Christian Curwen was the father of William Blamire, who served as High Sheriff of Cumberland and MP for Cumberland. Another brother, Richard, was a bookseller in London who published many of William Gilpin's work regarding the picturesque. Through these brothers, Susanna was introduced to the London literary milieu. Her sister married Colonel Graham of Gartmore, who was an officer in the Highland regiment, through whom she had contacts in Scotland. Susannah went as her sister's companion on trips to The Scottish Highlands, London and Ireland In Carlisle, Susanna encountered Catharine Gilpin of Scaleby Castle, who became a friend and possibly, according to Mandell Creighton, a co-author in verse. Through another aunt, Mrs Fell, who was a curates wife from Chilingham, Blamire befriended the aristocratic Tankerville family: there was talk of a possible marriage between her and the family's eldest son, Lord Ossulton, but the social mores of the milieu prevented the same, and he was sent abroad. She remained unmarried. Blamire was also a friend of the philosopher William Paley.

=== Illness and death ===
Blamire suffered from a recurrent and severe form of rheumatic heart disease, which killed her at the age of 47.

She died on 5 April 1794 in Carlisle and is buried by her own request at Raughton Head chapel.

== Works ==
Blamire often composed her poetry beside a stream in the garden at her residence at Thackwood. She also played the guitar and the flageolet, which she sometimes played whilst composing. She circulated her work privately, and pinned it to trees, and little of it was published during her lifetime. However, some of her poetry was published in single sheets, anthologies, and magazines, during her lifetime. Anonymously, to the Scots Musical Museum, Blamire contributed songs in Lallans: What ails this Heart o' Mine?, and The Siller Croun (alias And ye shall walk in Silk Attire). With The Waefu' Heart, these three of her works were set to music by Joseph Haydn. These three songs were set to remarkably fitting music by Haydn and can be heard sung on CDs by 'Haydn Trio Eisenstadt' with Lona Anderson, soprano: 'The Siller Croun' (Hob.XXX1a:260; 'The Waefu' Heart' (Hob.XXX1a:9/bis); 'What Ails this Heart o' Mine' (Hob.XX1a:244). Haydn used a German translation of the three lyrics to understand their emotional tone and was given Susanna's original English lyrics for the metre. He pitched the pathos of his music perfectly.

Her complete works were first compiled and published, by Patrick Maxwell of Edinburgh and Henry Lonsdale of Carlisle, in 1842, as The Poetical Works of Miss Susanna Blamire, The Muse of Cumberland. These two publishers had collected her manuscripts since 1836. Her corpus contains Gothic allegories in Standard English; songs in the Scots dialect, such as What ails this Heart o' Mine; songs in the Cumberland dialect, such as 'Wey, Ned! Man!', which are comparable to poems in the same dialect by William Wordsworth and Samuel Taylor Coleridge in their Lyrical Ballads; colloquial epistles addressed to friends; and the use of heroic couplets, in Stoklewath or the Cumbrian Village, an intricate depiction of rural life that is her most accomplished poem. Patrick Maxwell, aforementioned, claimed that Blamire was "unquestionably the best female writer of her age".

She has been credited with anticipating the Romantic conception of the world immortalized by William Wordsworth and Samuel Taylor Coleridge. Furthermore, her poem The Nun's Return to the World [...] may have been an influence on Lord Byron's The Prisoner of Chillon: Indeed, the late Professor Jonathan Wordsworth of St Catharine's College, Cambridge, in his lecture at the dedication service of Susanna's bicentenary memorial tablet in Carlisle Cathedral on 20 March 1994, said: 'We might be listening to Byron's Prisoner of Chillon.' Some evidence for this attribution is as follows: Blamire's half-sister, Bridget (1757-1832), offspring of Susanna Blamire's father's second marriage, took a huge interest in Susanna's poetic manuscripts, some of which she had prepared for publication. She married George Brown, a lawyer and Freeman of the City of Newcastle-on-Tyne. Following his premature death in 1795, she established Newbottle School, at Houghton-le Spring, County Durham, six miles from Anabella Milbanke’s house in Seaham. It is quite possible that Byron could have read a manuscript or a transcript of Blamire's poems whilst at Seaham Manor, immediately after his marriage to Milbanke in 1815. Also, Bridget's son, William, (born 1787) was a tutor to Annabella until shortly after her marriage to Byron in 1815.

Another interesting connection was through Susanna's niece Mary née Blamire and her husband, The Revd Thomas Young [my great x2 grandparents], who was educated with William Wordsworth at Hawkshead Grammar School and later was Senior Tutor at Trinity College, Cambridge (from 1806) during Byron's time as an undergraduate there. Young came from a statesman's family at Cumdivock, Near Carlisle, only three miles from The Blamire's family house, The Oaks, at Dalston and six miles from Thackwood Manor, where Susanna and her nephew, William Blamire MP, High Sheriff and Chief Tithe Commissioner had lived. So, it is certainly possible that an academic like Young, living so closely in a rural community could have known of or read Susanna's writings. The Byron scholar, Professor Jerome McGann, of the University of Virginia, believed: ‘It seems quite possible that Susanna’s poem was in Byron’s mind when he wrote The Prisoner of Chillon.’.

=== Reception of Poetry ===
Charles Dickens in his The Old Curiosity Shop (1841, end of chapter 66) had quoted its first two lines:

" 'Sir' said Dick (Swiveller), ... 'we'll make a scholar of the poor Marchioness yet! And she shall walk in silk attire, and siller have to spare, or may I never rise from this bed again!' ".

Hugh MacDiarmid praised her in a radio broadcast in 1947, as "this sweet Cumbrian singer". He insisted that her Scottish songs are "the high-water mark of her achievement … so good that they can be set beside the best that have ever been produced by Scotsmen writing in their own tongue". Jonathan Wordsworth, a great-nephew of William Wordsworth, dubbed her, in 1994, "The Poet of Friendship", predicting on BBC Radio Cumbria in 1998 that "Susanna will eventually be seen as important as the other Romantic poets writing during the eighteenth century, and should be more widely read". In The New Penguin Book of Romantic Poetry he likened Blamire's social position to that of Jane Austen:

‘the well-to-do maiden aunt’s life of good works and humorous observation'.
