= Rose Castle =

Fortified house in Cumbria, England

Coordinates: 54.8064°N 2.9802°W

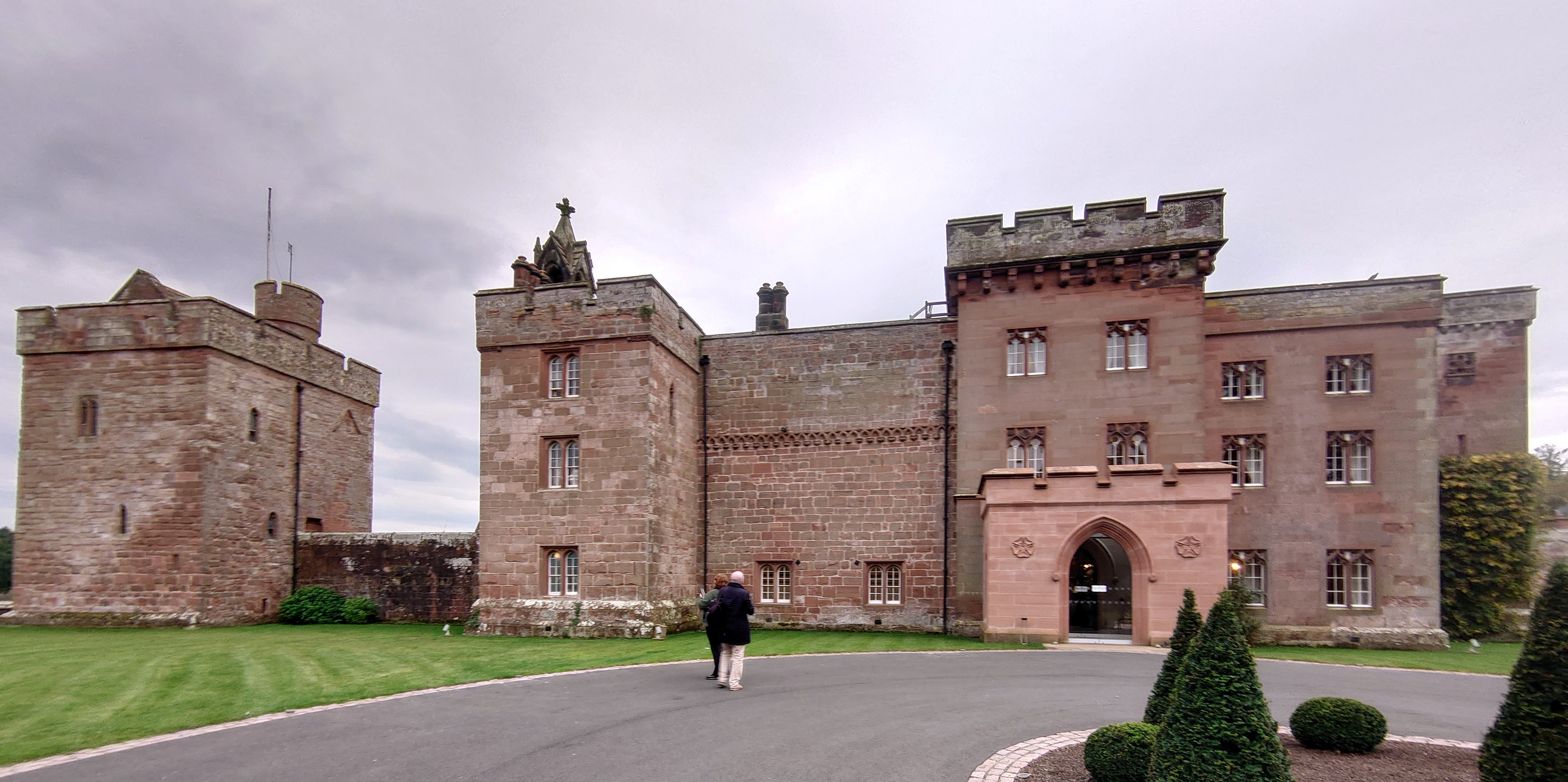
Rose Castle, Cumbria, England

Rose Castle is a fortified house in the parish of Dalston, Cumbria, England. It was the residence of the bishops of Carlisle from 1230 to 2009, and has been a peace and reconciliation centre since it was sold by the Church Commissioners to the Rose Castle Foundation in 2016. The castle is a grade I listed building.

The medieval castle consisted of four irregular ranges around a courtyard, but it has been altered several times. Significant changes took place in approximately 1665, when bishop Edward Rainbowe had the east and south ranges demolished and remodelled the remaining structure, including the chapel of 1487–49. Further large changes took place between 1828 and 1831 under bishop Hugh Percy, who commissioned Thomas Rickman to remodel the entrance chapel, and west wing. Rickman also altered the Strickland Tower, a pele tower which has been dated to both c. 1300 and c. 1400 and which is attached to the rest of the castle by a short stretch of curtain wall.

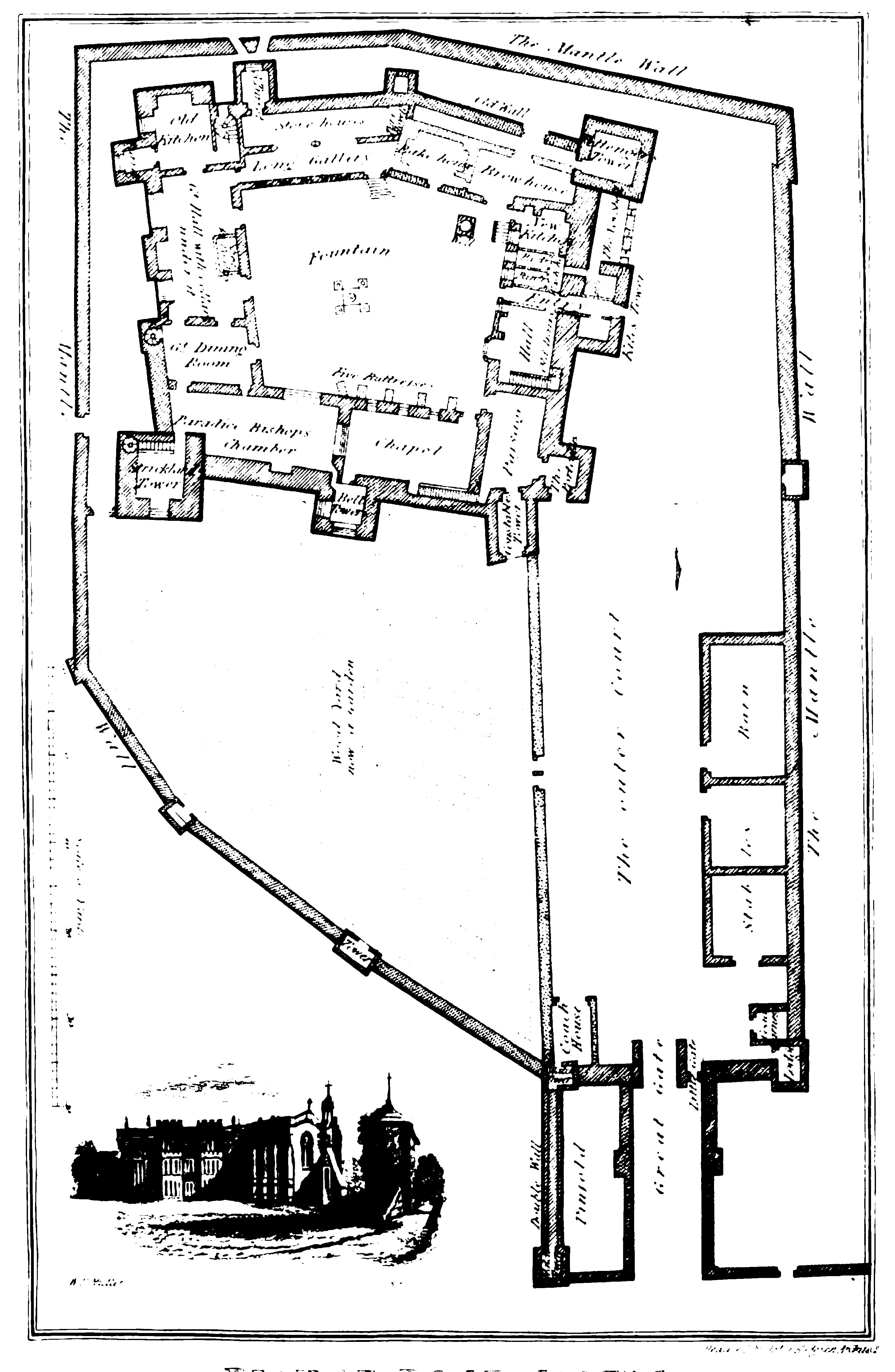
Plan of the old castle, from Samuel Jefferson, History and Antiquities of Carlisle (1838), placed after p. 376.

== Sale ==
In September 2015, Rose Castle was listed for sale, with a sale price in excess of £2,950,000. It has since been purchased with the aim to turn it into an international centre of reconciliation.

== See also ==
- Grade I listed buildings in Cumbria
- Listed buildings in Dalston, Cumbria
