= Bolection =

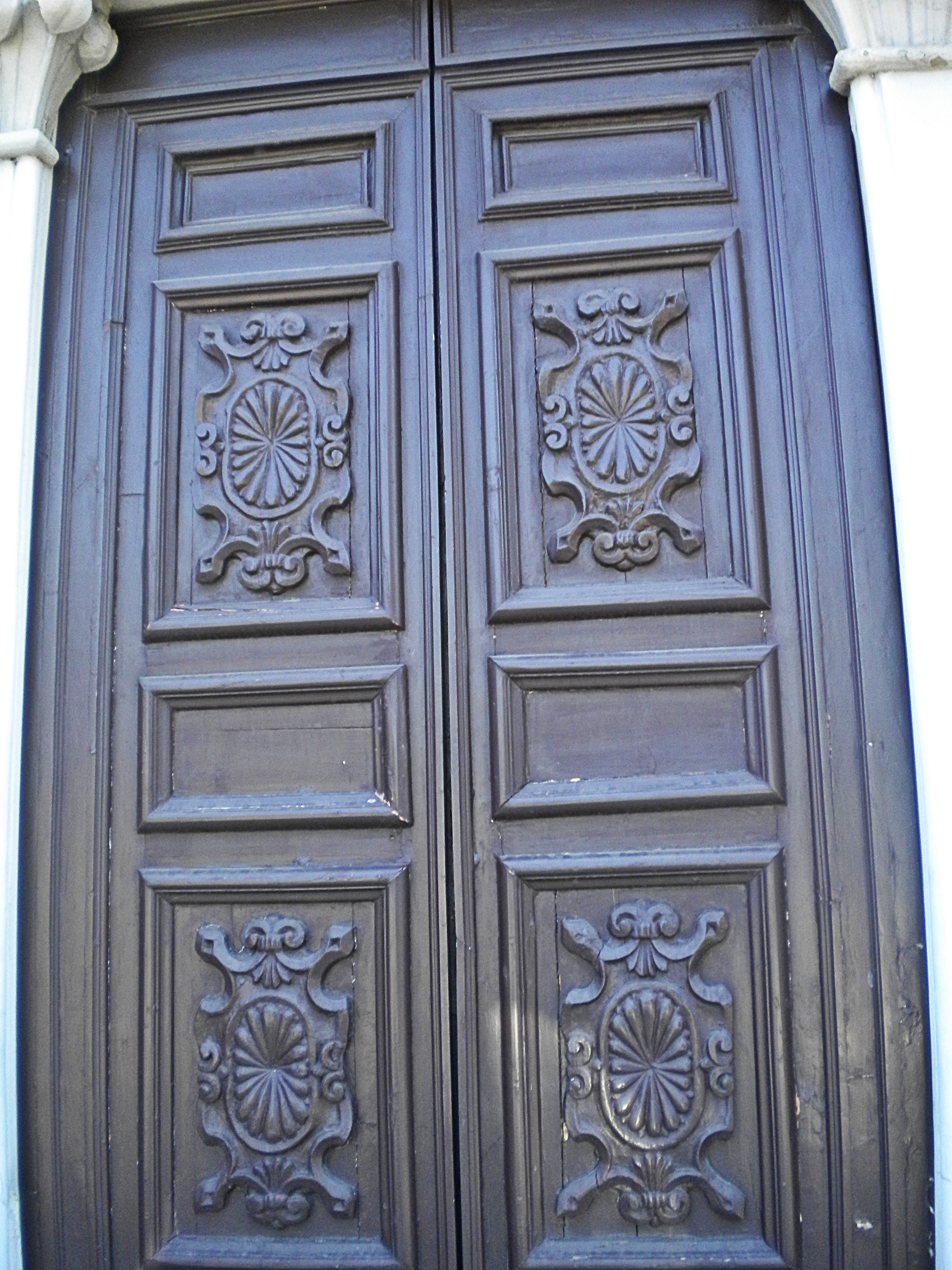
Bolection around panels on a door

A bolection is a decorative moulding which projects beyond the face of a panel or frame in raised panel walls, doors, and fireplaces. It is commonly used when the meeting surfaces are at different levels, especially to hold floating panels in place while allowing them to expand and contract with changes in temperature and humidity.

Also sometimes called balection or bilection, the term is of uncertain etymology and was first used in the early 18th century. Bolection was used to great effect by Christopher Wren.

Bolection mouldings are usually rabbeted on their underside to the depth of the lower element, but attached to the upper (when panels are allowed to float) or both (when merely decorative).

Bolection mouldings were also regularly used in the 16th and 17th century for picture frames. On frames of this type, the highest point of the moulding is close to the sight edge (the inner edge of the frame which meets the picture), from which the profile descends towards its lowest point at its outer edge. Such frames are sometimes described as bolection frames but more often as "reverse profile" frames.

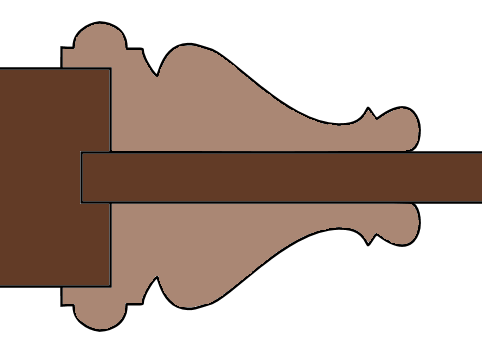
Cross-section of an ornate bolection moulding hiding the edges of a recessed panel
