= Cardew, Cumbria =

Hamlet in Cumbria, England

Coordinates: 54.834°N 3.027°W

Cardew
- Hamlet
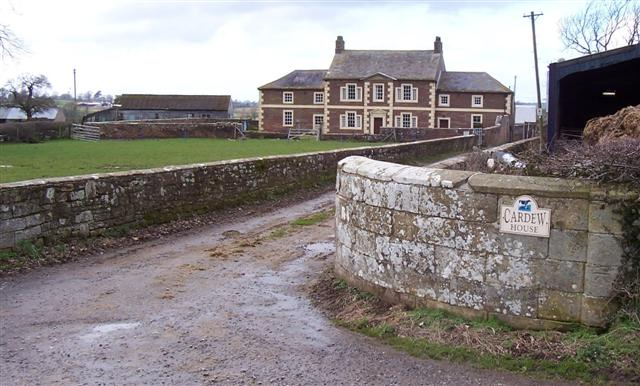
- Cardew House Farm

- Location in the former Carlisle district, Cumbria Location within Cumbria
- OS grid reference: NY340492
- Civil parish: Dalston
- Unitary authority: Cumberland
- Ceremonial county: Cumbria
- Region: North West
- Country: England
- Sovereign state: United Kingdom
- Post town: CARLISLE
- Postcode district: CA5
- Dialling code: 01228
- Police: Cumbria
- Fire: Cumbria
- Ambulance: North West
- UK Parliament: Carlisle

Cardew is a hamlet in Cumbria, England. It is located southwest of Dalston, south of Cardewlees and east of Thursby.

Cardew House, a 16th-century farmhouse built for the Denton family, is a country house of note and Cardew Lodge, a hunting lodge built for Major General William Henry Lowther, is a country house built in the style of an Indian bungalow.

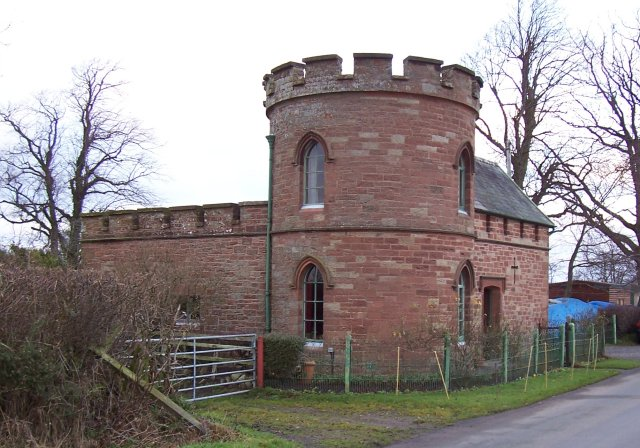
Another house in the village

== See also ==
- List of places in Cumbria
