= Listed buildings in Martindale, Cumbria =

Martindale is a civil parish in Westmorland and Furness, Cumbria, England. It contains eleven listed buildings that are recorded in the National Heritage List for England. Of these, one is listed at Grade II*, the middle of the three grades, and the others are at Grade II, the lowest grade. The parish is in the Lake District National Park, and is sparsely populated, the only centres of habitation being the hamlets of Howtown and Sandwick; most of the parish consists of countryside, moorland and fells. The listed buildings comprise houses and associated structures, farmhouses, farm buildings, two churches and a monument in a churchyard, and two bridges.

== Key ==
Grade	Criteria
II*	Particularly important buildings of more than special interest
II	Buildings of national importance and special interest

== Buildings ==
Name and location	Photograph	Date	Notes	Grade
St Martin's Church; 54.55769°N 2.87617°W		c. 1653	The church was rebuilt on medieval foundations, the porch was added in about 1714, and the roof was replaced in the 1880s. The church is in stone with a slate roof, and it consists of a nave and chancel in a single cell, with a west porch, and a bellcote on the west gable.	II*
Cotehow; 54.56199°N 2.87574°W	—	Late 17th century (probable)	A roughcast stone house with a slate roof, two storeys and three bays. The windows are sashes, and at the rear is an outshut with a catslide roof built into the hillside.	II
Birket Monument; 54.55762°N 2.87594°W	—	1699	The monument is in the churchyard of St Martin's Church. It is in stone rubble with an ashlar slab top which is inscribed and has a moulded edge. It commemorates a benefactor and a long-standing curate of the church.	II
Bushby Cottage and barn 54.56884°N 2.89383°W	—	Late 17th to early 18th century	The house and barn are in stone with a slate roof. The house is roughcast with crow-stepped gables, and has two storeys, three bays, and a gabled wing to the right. The windows are casements, with a hood mould above the ground floor windows. The barn to the north has an entrance, a loft door, and a long gabled wing and an outshut to the rear that are incorporated into the house.	II
Townhead, cottage, barn and railings 54.56849°N 2.89336°W	—	1720	The house, cottage and barn are in stone with slate roofs. The house has two storeys, three bays, two gabled wings at the rear, and sash windows. The cottage to the left has one storey and a single bay. The barn to the right has sandstone dressings, a hipped roof, a door with an inscribed and dated lintel, and a datestone. There is a long wing to the rear, and an outshut at the front. In front of the gardens of the house and the cottage are a wall with iron railings, gates with decorative finials, and gate and angle piers with ogival caps.	II
Thrang Crag; 54.54988°N 2.87609°W	—	Early 18th century (probable)	A stone farmhouse with a slate roof, two storeys and four bays. On the front is a gabled porch. Most of the windows are sashes, one is a casement window, and one window has a mullion. At the rear is a gabled wing and an outshut with a catslide roof.	II
Hause Farmhouse and barn 54.56411°N 2.87684°W	—	Early to mid 18th century	The farmhouse and barn are in stone with a slate roof. The house has two storeys, four bays, and a continuous outshut at the rear. The windows are sashes, and there is a hood mould above the ground floor windows. The barn to the east has three bays and a crow-stepped gable with a finial.	II
Bridge near Howtown House; 54.56892°N 2.86254°W	—	18th century (probable)	The bridge crosses Fusedale Beck. It is in stone and consists of a single segmental arch. The bridge has abutments but no parapets.	II
The Old Vicarage; 54.56303°N 2.88879°W	—	c. 1812	A stuccoed stone house with a slate roof, it has two storeys and three bays, with flanking single-storey gabled wings. The central doorway has a pulvinated frieze and a triangular pediment. The windows are sashes with stone surrounds, and at the rear is a stair window. On the gables of the wings are roundels.	II
Christy Bridge; 54.55699°N 2.87751°W		1851	The bridge carries a road over the Howe Grain. It is in stone and consists of a single segmental arch, and has a low parapet of upright stones. The roadway is about 3.5 metres (11 ft) wide.	II
St Peter's Church; 54.56444°N 2.87364°W		1880–02	The church, designed by J. A, Cory, is in slate rubble with sandstone dressings, and it has a slate roof with coped gables. The church consists of a nave and a chancel with a south vestry. On the west gable is a bellcote, and the windows are lancets.	II
