= Henry Brougham =

Henry Brougham may refer to:

- Henry Brougham (divine) (1665–1696), English cleric
- Henry Brougham (landowner) (1742–1810), landowner in north-west England
- Henry Brougham, 1st Baron Brougham and Vaux (1778–1868), son of the above
- Henry Brougham, 3rd Baron Brougham and Vaux (1836–1927), British noble and civil servant
- Henry Brougham (sportsman) (1888–1923), British racquets, rugby and cricket player
- Henry Brougham (priest) (died 1913), Dean of Lismore
- Henry Brougham (fictional character), character in the 1947 film The Bishop's Wife
