= John French =

John French may refer to:

== Military ==
- John French, 1st Earl of Ypres (1852–1925), commander of the British Expeditionary Force in World War I
- John French, 2nd Earl of Ypres (1881–1958), British soldier and artist, son of the 1st Earl
- John French, 3rd Earl of Ypres (1921–1988), British peer, son of John French, 2nd Earl of Ypres
- Jack French (John Alexander French, 1914–1942), Australian soldier, Victoria Cross recipient

== Politics ==
- John French (MP for Winchelsea) (died 1420), MP for Winchelsea
- John French (MP for Hythe)
- John French (MP for Winchester), British Member of Parliament for Winchester
- John French (judge) (1670–1728), Justice of the Colonial Delaware Supreme Court
- John William French (1888–1970), Canadian politician

== Sports ==
- John French (field hockey) (born 1946), British Olympic hockey player
- John French (ice hockey) (born 1950), Canadian ice hockey player
- John French (racing driver) (1930–2025), Australian racing driver
- John French (speed skater) (born 1955), British Olympic speed skater

== Other ==
- John French (physician) (1616–1657), English doctor and chemist
- John French (Dean of Elphin) (1770–1848), Anglican priest in Ireland
- John French (academic), Oxford college head
- John W. French (1808–1871), American Episcopal clergyman
- John R. French (1819–1890), American publisher, editor, and politician
- John French (photographer) (1907–1966), English photographer
- John R. P. French (1913–1995), American psychologist
- John French (musician) (born 1948), American rock drummer

== See also ==
- Jay Jay French (born 1952), also called John French, American guitarist
