= John French, 3rd Earl of Ypres =

British soldier and peer (1921–1988)

Coat of arms of the Earl of Ypres

John Richard Charles Lambart French, 3rd Earl of Ypres (30 December 1921 – 4 March 1988) was a British soldier and peer, a member of the House of Lords.

Born in 1921, French was the son of John French, 2nd Earl of Ypres and his wife Olivia Mary John. He was educated at Sandroyd School and Winchester College. He fought in the Second World War between 1939 and 1945, rising to the rank of Captain in the King's Royal Rifle Corps. After the war, he continued his education at Trinity College, Dublin.

On 5 April 1958, French succeeded his father as Earl of Ypres and Viscount French in the peerage of the United Kingdom and was admitted to the House of Lords.

On 5 June 1943, French married firstly Maureen Helena Kelly, daughter of Henry John Piers Kelly of Stow Bedon Hall, Attleborough, Norfolk. They lived at Hawthorn Farm, Attleborough, and had three daughters:

- Lady Charlene Mary Olivia French (born 1946), married 1965 Charles Mordaunt Milner
- Lady Sarah Mary Essex French (born 1953)
- Lady Emma Mary Helena French (born 1958)

His father's estate had been valued for probate at £41,759, equivalent to £1,232,301 in 2023, but Ypres went into partnership in a business venture with Ernest H. Shinwell. The company failed in the summer of 1969, and in June 1970 Ypres was declared bankrupt. He later took a job as a hall porter in a block of flats in Chelsea and was reported to have "a Monty Pythonesque sense of humour about his predicament". His application to discharge the bankruptcy was dismissed in the High Court in January 1974.

From 1958, the heir presumptive to the peerages was an uncle, Gerald French, but in September 1970 he died, leaving only two daughters, Essex Leila Hilary French and Violet Valerie French.

Ypres and his first wife were divorced in 1972, and in the same year he married secondly Deborah Roberts. They had one daughter:

- Lady Lucy Kathleen French (born 1975).

Ypres died on 4 March 1988, when his peerages became extinct.

== Notes ==
Peerage of the United Kingdom
Preceded by John French	Earl of Ypres; 1958–1988	Extinct
