= Middlesceugh =

Hamlet in Cumbria, England

Coordinates: 54.758°N 2.924°W

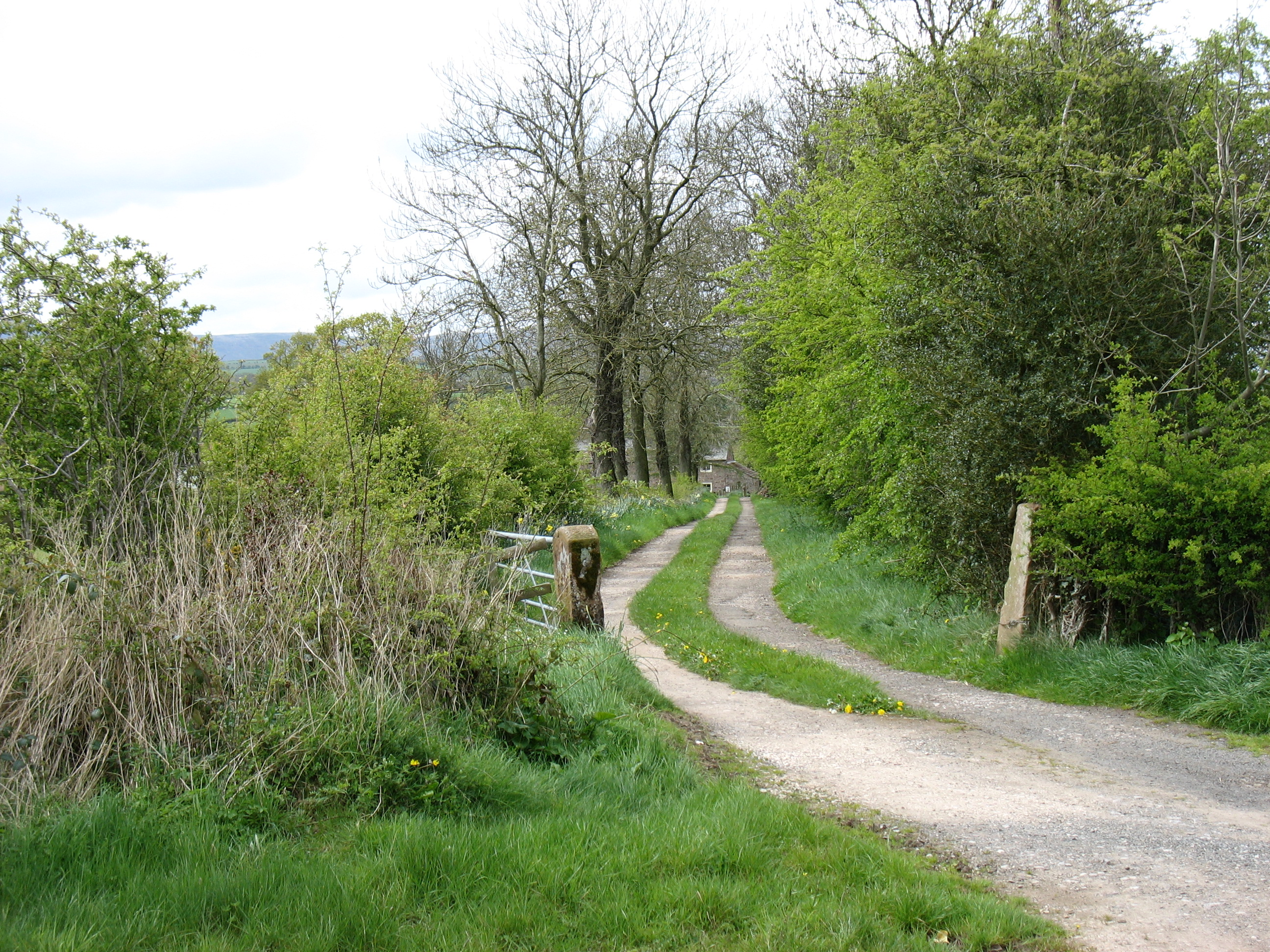
- The drive to Dupton House, Middlesceugh

- Location in Eden, Cumbria Location within Cumbria
- OS grid reference: NY405407
- Civil parish: Skelton
- Unitary authority: Westmorland and Furness
- Ceremonial county: Cumbria
- Region: North West
- Country: England
- Sovereign state: United Kingdom
- Post town: CARLISLE
- Postcode district: CA4
- Dialling code: 017684
- Police: Cumbria
- Fire: Cumbria
- Ambulance: North West
- UK Parliament: Penrith and Solway

Middlesceugh is a hamlet in the civil parish of Skelton, in the Westmorland and Furness district of Cumbria, England.

== History ==
The name is recorded as 'Middil Stouke' in 1419.

'Middlesceugh and Braithwaite' was historically a township which straddled the ancient parishes of Carlisle St Mary (which had its parish church at Carlisle Cathedral) and Hesket-in-the-Forest. The part of St Mary's parish was detached from the main part of the parish, being over 9 miles (14 km) south of Carlisle; its inhabitants tended to actually use the churches at nearby Ivegill, High Head or Sebergham. The township took on civil functions under the poor laws from the 17th century onwards, and as such also became a civil parish in 1866, when the legal definition of 'parish' was changed to be the areas used for administering the poor laws.

The civil parish of Middlesceugh and Braithwaite was abolished in 1934, being absorbed into the neighbouring parish of Skelton.

== Geography ==
Middlesceugh has a SSSI called Middlesceugh Woods And Pastures, alongside the Roe Beck. It forms part of the Cumbrian Marsh Fritillary Site, which was involved in the Natura 2000 programme.
