= Baron Brougham and Vaux =

Barony in the Peerage of the United Kingdom

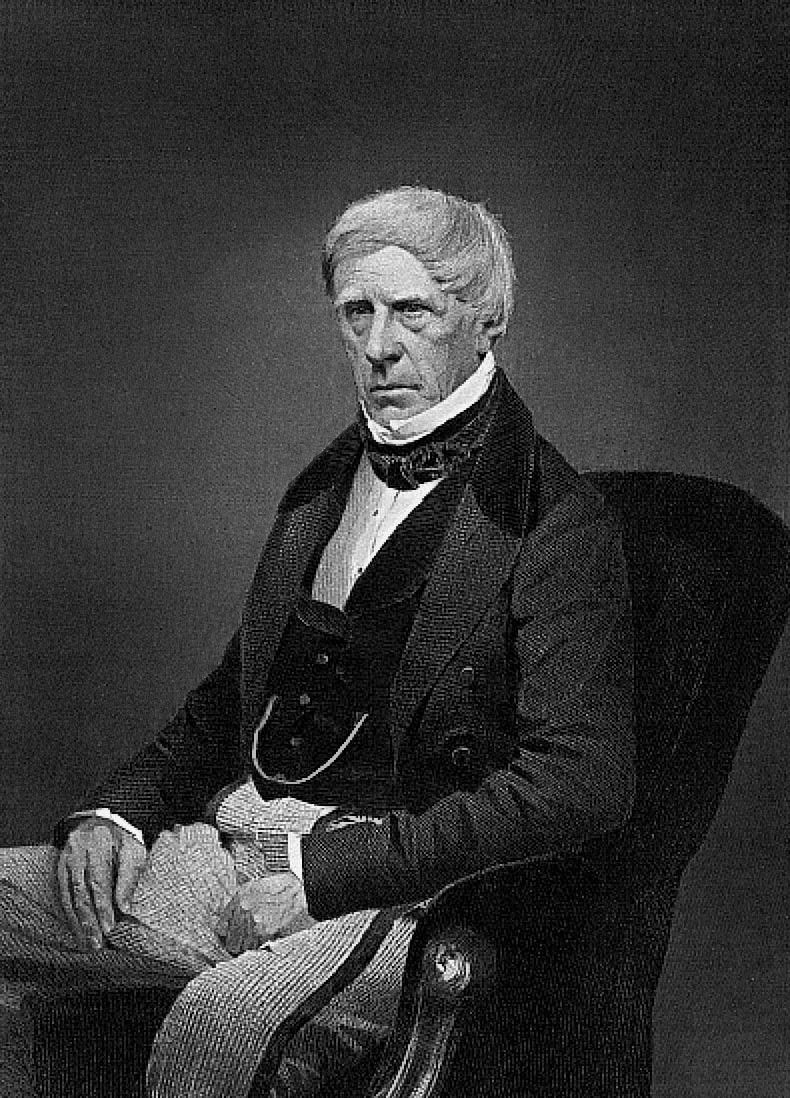
Henry Brougham, 1st Baron Brougham and Vaux

Baron Brougham and Vaux (/brʊm ... vɔːks/), of Brougham in the County of Westmorland and of High Head Castle in the County of Cumberland, is a title in the Peerage of the United Kingdom. It was created in 1860 for Henry Brougham, 1st Baron Brougham and Vaux, a lawyer, Whig politician, and formerly Lord Chancellor, with remainder to his younger brother William Brougham. He had already been created Baron Brougham and Vaux, of Brougham in the County of Westmorland, in 1830, also in the Peerage of the United Kingdom, with normal remainder to the heirs male of his body.

Jockey colours for Lord Brougham and Vaux

On his death in 1868, the barony of 1830 became extinct as he had no sons, while he was succeeded in the barony of 1860 according to the special remainder by his brother William, who became the second Baron. William had earlier represented Southwark in the House of Commons. As of 2023, the title is held by William's great-great-great-grandson, the sixth Baron, who succeeded his father in 2023. His father was one of the ninety-two elected hereditary peers that were allowed to remain in the House of Lords after the passing of the House of Lords Act 1999, and sat as a Conservative.

== Barons Brougham and Vaux, first creation (1830) ==
- Henry Peter Brougham, 1st Baron Brougham and Vaux (1778–1868)

== Barons Brougham and Vaux, second creation (1860) ==
- Henry Peter Brougham, 1st Baron Brougham and Vaux (1778–1868)
- William Brougham, 2nd Baron Brougham and Vaux (1795–1886)
- Henry Charles Brougham, 3rd Baron Brougham and Vaux (1836–1927)
  - Hon. Henry Brougham (1887–1927)
- Victor Henry Peter Brougham, 4th Baron Brougham and Vaux (1909–1967)
  - Hon. Julian Brougham (1932–1952)
- Michael John Brougham, 5th Baron Brougham and Vaux (1938–2023)
- Charles William Brougham, 6th Baron Brougham and Vaux (born 1971).

The heir apparent is the present holder's son, the Hon. Henry George Brougham (born 2012).

== Male-line family tree ==
Male-line family tree, Barons Brougham and Vaux (both creations)

Henry Brougham; 1742–1810
Baron Brougham and Vaux (1830 and 1860 creations)
Henry Brougham; 1st Baron Brougham and Vaux; 1778–1868	William Brougham; 2nd Baron Brougham and Vaux; 1795–1886
1830 creation extinct
Henry Brougham; 3rd Baron Brougham and Vaux; 1836–1927
Hon. Henry Brougham; 1887–1927
Victor Brougham; 4th Baron Brougham and Vaux; 1909–1967
Hon. Julian Brougham; 1932–1952	Michael Brougham; 5th Baron Brougham and Vaux; 1938–2023
Charles Brougham; 6th Baron Brougham and Vaux born 1971
Hon. Henry Brougham born 2012

== Arms ==
Coat of arms of Baron Brougham and Vaux
Crest A dexter arm in armour embowed Proper the hand holding a lucy fessewise Argent and charged on the elbow with a rose Gules. Escutcheon Gules a chevron between three lucies hauriant Argent. Supporters Dexter a lion Vert armed and langued Gules gorged with a vaux collar checky Or and of the second, sinister a stag Argent attired and unguled Or holding in the mouth a rose Gules barbed and seeded Vert. Motto Pro Rege Lege Grege (For The King The Law And The People)
