= Skelton, Cumbria =

Village and civil parish in Cumbria, England

Coordinates: 54.710833°N 2.875556°W

Skelton
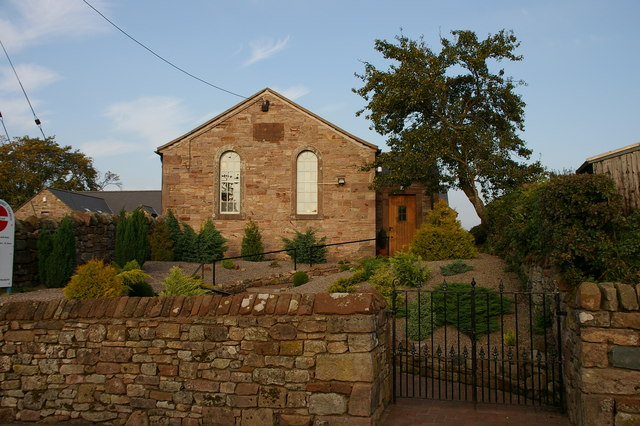
- Skelton Methodist Church

- Location in Eden, Cumbria Location within Cumbria
- Population: 1,153 (2011)
- OS grid reference: NY4335
- Civil parish: Skelton
- Unitary authority: Westmorland and Furness
- Ceremonial county: Cumbria
- Region: North West
- Country: England
- Sovereign state: United Kingdom
- Post town: PENRITH
- Postcode district: CA11
- Dialling code: 017684
- Police: Cumbria
- Fire: Cumbria
- Ambulance: North West
- UK Parliament: Penrith and Solway

Skelton is a small village and civil parish about 7 miles (11 km) north west of Penrith in the English county of Cumbria. It is on the former route of the B5305 road, which is now about 1 mile (2 km) to the north. The parish had a population of 1,059 in 2001, increasing slightly to 1,153 at the 2011 Census.

The village has a primary school, pub, and Anglican and Methodist churches.

Close to the village is the Skelton transmitting station and the stately home of Hutton-in-the-Forest, the family home of Lord Inglewood.

Skelton Agricultural Show is one of the largest in Cumbria and takes place on the first Saturday in July at Hutton-in-the-Forest.

The large parish of Skelton includes the villages and hamlets of Ellonby, Ivegill, Lamonby, Unthank, Unthank End, Skelton Wood End, Laithes, Hutton End, Hutton Row, New Rent, Braithwaite and Middlesceugh.

In 1934 the parish absorbed the former civil parishes of Hutton-in-the-Forest, and Middlesceugh and Braithwaite, plus part of Dalston.

Hutton-in-the-Forest included New Rent, Hutton End and Hutton Row and was bordered on the east by Hesket-in-the-Forest. "Forest" refers to the ancient royal hunting ground of Inglewood Forest which included all of the present-day Skelton.

== Governance ==
An electoral ward in the same name exists. This ward stretches beyond the confines of Skelton Parish with a total population taken at the 2011 Census of 1,497.

== See also ==
- Listed buildings in Skelton, Cumbria
