= Henry Brougham (landowner) =

English landowner and lawyer (1742–1810)

Henry Brougham, FRSE (18 June 1742 – 13 February 1810) was an English landowner and lawyer who owned extensive estates in Westmorland. A members of the Faculty of Advocates, in 1802 he relaunched the Edinburgh Review with the help of his son Henry.

== Life ==
He was born at Scales Hall, Cumberland, on 18 June 1742, the son of Henry Brougham (d. 1782), Steward to the Duke of Norfolk, and Mary Freeman (1714–1807). His younger brother was Rev John Brougham FRSE (1748–1811). The family moved to Brougham Hall in 1756.

Educated at Eton College, Brougham then trained as a lawyer at Gray's Inn from 1765, before marrying and moving to Edinburgh. He resided at No. 21, on the north side of St Andrew Square, in what was then, a brand new Georgian townhouse and it is here that he established himself in the Scots legal scene.

He was elected a Fellow of the Royal Society of Edinburgh in 1784, one of his proposers being his father-in-law, William Robertson.

Brougham died on 13 February 1810 in Edinburgh and was buried at Restalrig Church.

== Family ==
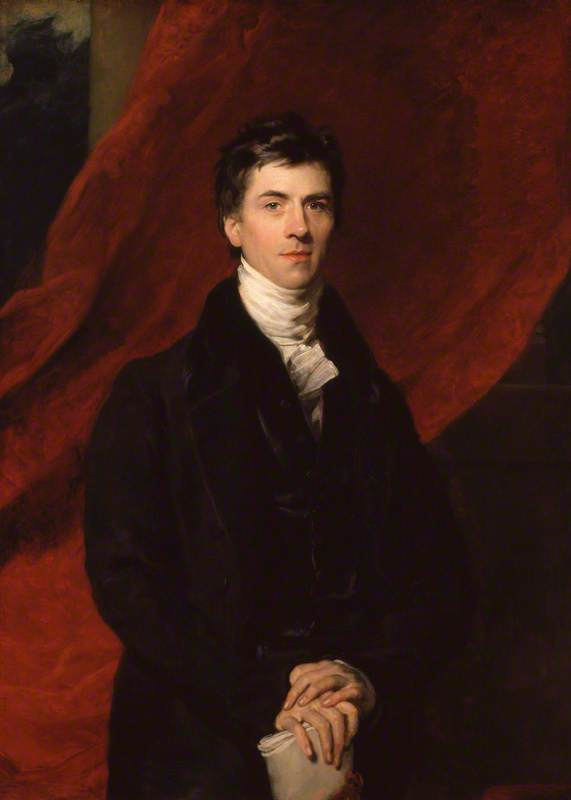
Portrait of Henry Brougham, 1825

Brougham married in 1777 Eleanor Syme, daughter of the Rev James Syme and niece of William Robertson FRSE. They had six children, one daughter and five sons.

Their eldest son became Henry Brougham, 1st Baron Brougham and Vaux (1778–1868); their youngest son, William (1795–1886) succeeded him in the barony in 1868, all other sons having already died by then.

== See also ==
- Burke's Peerage & Baronetage
