= Michael Brougham, 5th Baron Brougham and Vaux =

British politician (1938–2023)

The Right Honourable The Lord Brougham and Vaux CBE
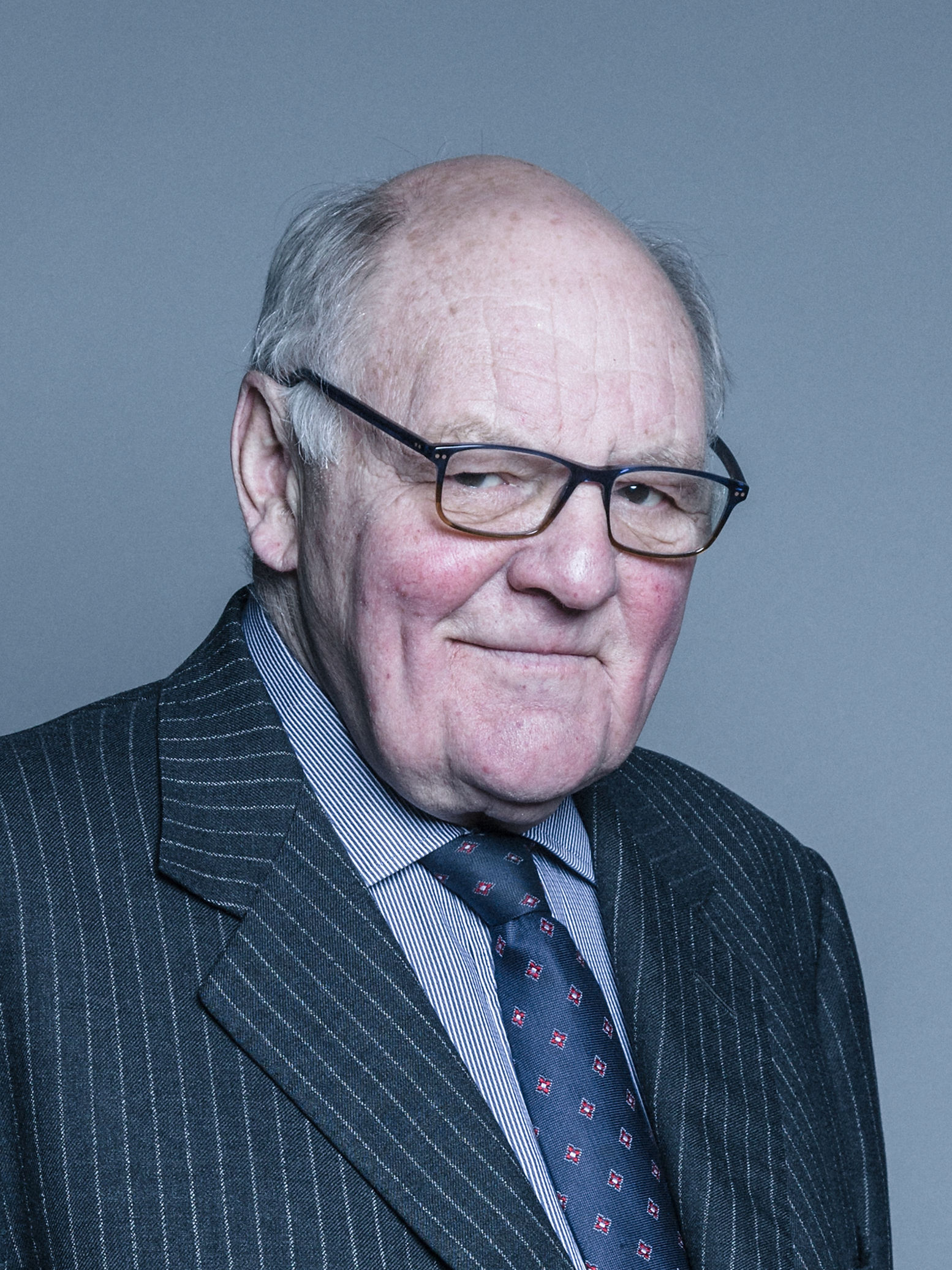
- Official portrait, 2018

Member of the House of Lords
- Lord Temporal
- Hereditary peerage 24 January 1968 – 11 November 1999
- Preceded by: The 4th Baron Brougham and Vaux
- Succeeded by: Seat abolished
- Elected Hereditary Peer; 11 November 1999 – 27 August 2023
- Election: 1999
- Preceded by: Seat established
- Succeeded by: The 8th Baron Camoys

Personal details
- Born: 2 August 1938
- Died: 27 August 2023 (aged 85)
- Party: Conservative
- Spouses: Olivia Susan Gray (m. 1963; div. 1967) Catherine Jill Gulliver (m. 1969; div. 1981) Sezgin Patterson (m. 2022)
- Children: 2
- Parent: Victor Brougham (father)
- Education: Millfield; Northampton Institute of Agriculture

Michael John Brougham, 5th Baron Brougham and Vaux (2 August 1938 – 27 August 2023), was a British peer and a member of the House of Lords from 1968 until his death.

== Biography ==
Born the second son of Victor Brougham, 4th Baron Brougham and Vaux, Brougham was educated at Millfield, Lycée Jaccard, Switzerland, and the Northampton Institute of Agriculture.

Succeeding to his father's title in 1967, Brougham served as a deputy chairman of the Committees of the House of Lords, a deputy speaker of the House of Lords since 1995 and was vice-chairman of the Association of Conservative Peers. He was president of the Royal Society for the Prevention of Accidents from 1986 to 1989 (and vice-president since 1990), and was president of Safety Groups UK since it replaced the National Health and Safety Groups Council in 2005. He had also been chairman of the Tax Payers' Society from 1989 to 1991 and chairman of the European Secure Vehicle Alliance since 1992. In 1995, he was appointed Commander of the Order of the British Empire (CBE) for political services.

On 20 July 1963, he married Olivia Susan Gray and they had one daughter, Henrietta Louise (born 23 February 1965). He divorced his wife in 1967 and married Catherine Jill Gulliver. They had one son, Charles William Brougham (born 1971), who succeeded his father in the title.

Brougham died on 27 August 2023, at the age of 85.

== Arms ==
Coat of arms of Michael Brougham, 5th Baron Brougham and Vaux
Crest A dexter arm in armour embowed Proper the hand holding a lucy fessewise Argent and charged on the elbow with a rose Gules. Escutcheon Gules a chevron between three lucies hauriant Argent. Supporters Dexter a lion Vert armed and langued Gules gorged with a vaux collar checky Or and of the second, sinister a stag Argent attired and unguled Or holding in the mouth a rose Gules barbed and seeded Vert. Motto Pro Rege Lege Grege (For The King The Law And The People)

== Sources ==
- Burke's Peerage and Gentry
- House of Lords biography
- Hansard

Peerage of the United Kingdom
Preceded by Victor Brougham	Baron Brougham and Vaux; 1967–2023; Member of the House of Lords (1968–1999)	Succeeded by Charles Brougham
Parliament of the United Kingdom
New office created by the House of Lords Act 1999	Elected hereditary peer to the House of Lords under the House of Lords Act 1999; 1999–2023	Succeeded by The Lord Camoys
