= Lamonby =

Hamlet in Cumbria, England

Coordinates: 54.713°N 2.918°W

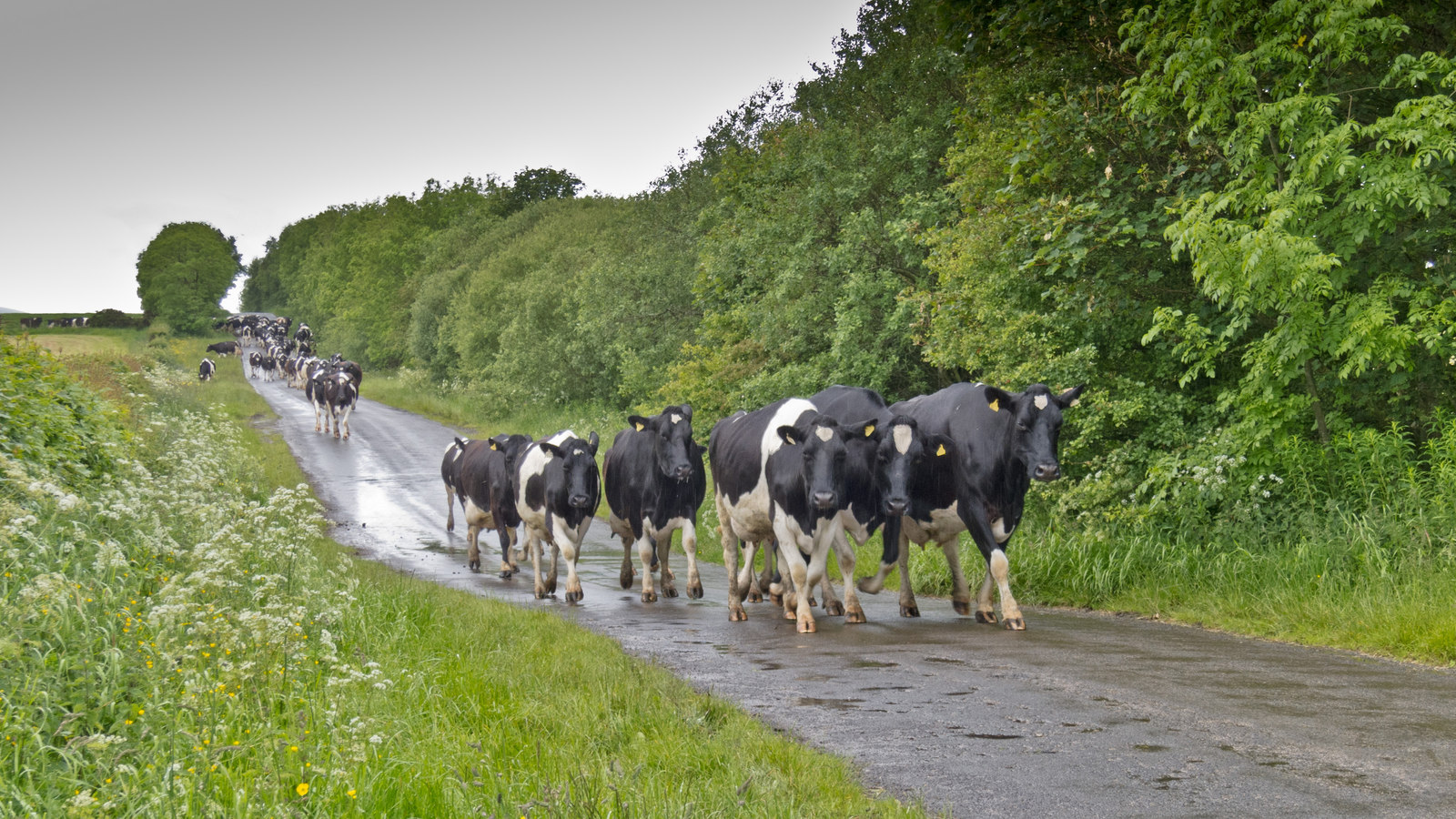
- Cows west of Lamonby

- Location in Eden, Cumbria Location within Cumbria
- OS grid reference: NY408357
- Civil parish: Skelton
- Unitary authority: Westmorland and Furness
- Ceremonial county: Cumbria
- Region: North West
- Country: England
- Sovereign state: United Kingdom
- Post town: PENRITH
- Postcode district: CA11
- Dialling code: 017684
- Police: Cumbria
- Fire: Cumbria
- Ambulance: North West
- UK Parliament: Penrith and Solway

Lamonby is an agricultural hamlet in the Westmorland and Furness district, in the county of Cumbria, England, about 2 km from the edge of the Lake District National Park. It is located near the B5305 road and the village of Skelton, in whose parish it lies. Public transport and social or commercial facilities are absent there. The surname Lamonby originates from the hamlet.

== History ==
The name "Lambenemy" is recorded for the hamlet in 1257. Limestone was quarried at Lamonby in earlier centuries. A topographical dictionary of 1808 records 43 houses and 244 inhabitants.

Lamonby Hall, a Grade II listed building, is described as late 16th- or early 17th-century with 20th-century alterations. It is built of large blocks of sandstone rubble with cement rendering and a greenslate roof with banded sandstone chimney stacks. After the Reformation, the hall is said to have included a Roman Catholic chapel. In the reign of Elizabeth, a certain Juliana Buckle of Yorkshire bought the hall on account of the chapel and kept a priest there for as long as it remained safe to do so. The chapel appears to be the origin of a piece of floral carving used in the large, segmental-arched main fireplace.

"Lammonby" on 28 January 1845 was the scene of a notoriously brutal infanticide by a drunken mother. According to The Times of a few days later, "On Tuesday evening, the 28th ult., [the mother] made up a large fire in the kitchen of her own house, with the determination of sacrificing her child in the flames.... She stripped off all the child's clothes and hid them in a hole behind the inner door of the ashmidden, and having done so took the child by its legs and arms and literally roasted it to death."

== Wind farm ==
A planning application for a wind farm of five 100-metre turbines at Lamonby was submitted in 2005 by a power company, E.ON UK. The application was withdrawn in March 2009, after 700 letters of objection had been received.

== See also ==
- Listed buildings in Skelton, Cumbria
