= Unthank, Skelton =

Village in Cumbria, England

Coordinates: 54.718°N 2.853°W

Unthank
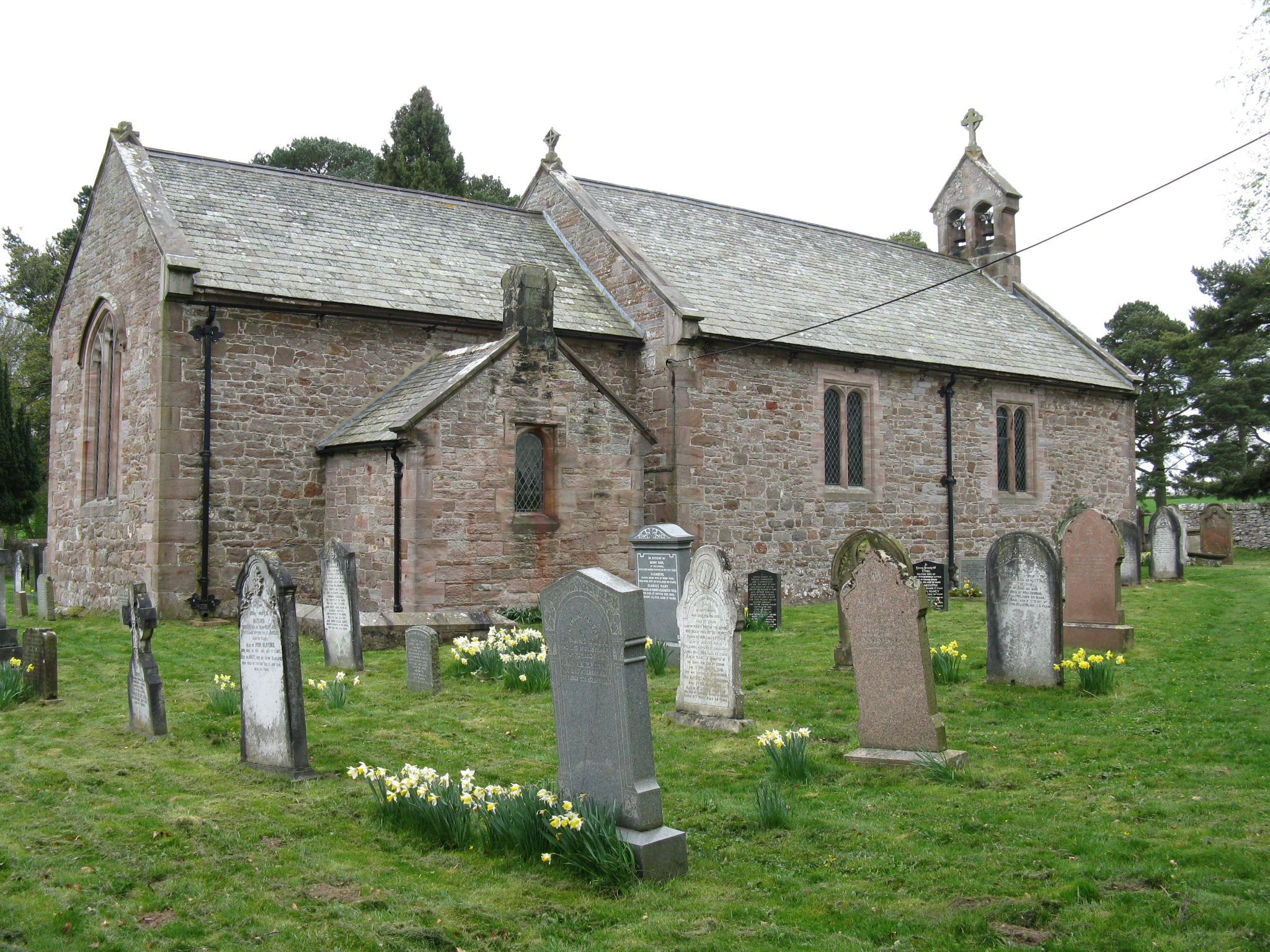
- St James' Church, Unthank

- Location in Eden, Cumbria Location within Cumbria
- OS grid reference: NY450362
- Civil parish: Skelton
- Unitary authority: Westmorland and Furness
- Ceremonial county: Cumbria
- Region: North West
- Country: England
- Sovereign state: United Kingdom
- Post town: PENRITH
- Postcode district: CA11
- Dialling code: 017684
- Police: Cumbria
- Fire: Cumbria
- Ambulance: North West
- UK Parliament: Penrith and Solway

Unthank is a village in the civil parish of Skelton, in the Westmorland and Furness district, in the ceremonial county of Cumbria, England. In 1870-72 the township had a population of 39 as recorded in the Imperial Gazetteer of England and Wales. From 1974 to 2023 it was in Eden district.

== See also ==
- Listed buildings in Skelton, Cumbria
