= Victor Brougham, 4th Baron Brougham and Vaux =

British peer and politician

The Right Honourable The Lord Brougham and Vaux

Member of the House of Lords
- Lord Temporal
- In office 24 May 1927 – 20 June 1967
- Preceded by: The 3rd Baron Brougham and Vaux
- Succeeded by: The 5th Baron Brougham and Vaux

Personal details
- Born: Victor Henry Peter Brougham; 23 October 1909
- Died: 20 June 1967 (aged 57)
- Spouses: Valerie Violet French (m. 1931; div. 1934) Jean Follet (m. 1935; div. 1942) Edith Ellaline Teichmann (m. 1942)
- Children: 3, including Michael
- Relatives: Henry Brougham, 3rd Baron Brougham and Vaux (grandfather)

Victor Henry Peter Brougham, 4th Baron Brougham and Vaux (23 October 1909 – 20 June 1967), was a British peer and politician.

== Background and family ==
Brougham's father, Henry Brougham, was the son and heir of the 3rd Baron Brougham and Vaux, but predeceased his father, dying just 20 days before his father in May 1927. Victor Brougham succeeded to the title upon his grandfather's death on 24 May 1927.

Brougham was married three times,

1. Valerie Violet French (m. 1931, divorced 1934), granddaughter of Sir John French. They had one son, Julian (1932–1952), who was killed while on active service in Malaya at the age of 19.
2. Jean Follet (m. 1935, divorced 1942). They had two sons: Michael (1938–2023), the future 5th Baron, and David (1940–2012).
3. Edith Ellaline Teichmann (m. 1942), previously married to Richard Hart-Davis. She was one of a series of society beauties photographed as classical figures by Madame Yevonde.

== Life and career ==
Brougham made his maiden speech in the House of Lords on 8 May 1934, in a debate on Parliamentary Reform, making a strong defence of democracy, concluding "Unless our Parliamentary system adapts itself very soon to the needs of the day, and unless it consciously reforms itself so as to carry out the functions demanded of Governments in modern circumstances, it will be done away with here as surely as it has disappeared in Russia, Germany and Italy."

He fought in the Second World War and gained the rank of 2nd Lieutenant in the Scots Guards. After the war, he served in the Territorial Army, reaching the rank of major.

Lord Brougham enjoyed gambling; in 1932, he auctioned artefacts from Brougham Hall to pay off his debts, and in 1934, the Hall itself was sold. In August 1953, Lord Brougham was declared bankrupt after having spent more than £125 000 on gambling, failed stock market speculation and a failed attempt to become a farmer. In court, he stated that he tried to get work to repay his debts, but working as manual labour, his salary seldom exceeded £10/month, the situation had got out of hands.

== Arms ==
Coat of arms of Victor Brougham, 4th Baron Brougham and Vaux
Crest A dexter arm in armour embowed Proper the hand holding a lucy fessewise Argent and charged on the elbow with a rose Gules. Escutcheon Gules a chevron between three lucies hauriant Argent. Supporters Dexter a lion Vert armed and langued Gules gorged with a vaux collar checky Or and of the second, sinister a stag Argent attired and unguled Or holding in the mouth a rose Gules barbed and seeded Vert. Motto Pro Rege Lege Grege (For The King The Law and the People)

Peerage of the United Kingdom
Preceded by Henry Brougham	Baron Brougham and Vaux; 2nd creation 1927–1967; Member of the House of Lords (1927–1967)	Succeeded by Michael Brougham
