= William Brougham, 2nd Baron Brougham and Vaux =

British barrister and Whig politician (1795–1886)

The Right Honourable The Lord Brougham and Vaux DL, JP

Member of the House of Lords Lord Temporal
- In office 7 May 1868 – 3 January 1886; Hereditary peerage
- Preceded by: The 1st Baron Brougham and Vaux
- Succeeded by: The 3rd Baron Brougham and Vaux

Member of Parliament for Southwark
- In office 1 June 1831 – 6 February 1835
- Preceded by: Sir Robert Wilson
- Succeeded by: Daniel Whittle Harvey

Personal details
- Born: 26 September 1795
- Died: 3 January 1886 (aged 90)
- Party: Liberal; Whig
- Spouse: Emily Frances Taylor (m. 1834; died 1884)
- Children: 6
- Parent(s): Henry Brougham; Eleanor Syme
- Education: Lincoln's Inn

William Brougham, 2nd Baron Brougham and Vaux DL, JP (26 September 1795 – 3 January 1886), known as William Brougham until 1868, was a British barrister and Whig politician.

== Background and education ==
Brougham was the youngest son of Henry Brougham and Eleanor Syme, daughter of the Reverend James Syme. Lord Chancellor Henry Brougham, 1st Baron Brougham and Vaux, was his elder brother. He was educated at Edinburgh High School and Jesus College, Cambridge, and was called to the Bar, Lincoln's Inn, in 1823.

== Career ==
Brougham was appointed a Master in Chancery in 1831, which he remained until the following year. In 1831 he was also returned to Parliament for Southwark, a seat he held until 1835. He was also lieutenant-colonel in the Cumberland Volunteers and served as a Deputy Lieutenant and Justice of the Peace for Cumberland. In 1868 he succeeded his elder brother as second Baron Brougham and Vaux according to a special remainder in the letters patent, and was able to take a seat in the House of Lords.

== Family ==
Lord Brougham and Vaux married Emily Frances, daughter of Sir Charles William Taylor, 1st Baronet, in 1834. They had three sons and three daughters. She died in April 1884. Lord Brougham and Vaux survived her by two years and died in January, 1886, aged 90, at Brougham Hall, a gothic revival mansion, the building of which was largely overseen by William before he succeeded Henry as Baron Brougham. He was succeeded in the barony by his eldest son, Henry.

== Arms ==
Coat of arms of William Brougham, 2nd Baron Brougham and Vaux
Crest A dexter arm in armour embowed Proper the hand holding a lucy fessewise Argent and charged on the elbow with a rose Gules. Escutcheon Gules a chevron between three lucies hauriant Argent. Supporters Dexter a lion Vert armed and langued Gules gorged with a vaux collar checky Or and of the second, sinister a stag Argent attired and unguled Or holding in the mouth a rose Gules barbed and seeded Vert. Motto Pro Rege Lege Grege (For The King The Law and the People)

Parliament of the United Kingdom
Preceded by Sir Robert Wilson; Charles Calvert	Member of Parliament for Southwark; 1831–1835; With: Charles Calvert 1831–1832; John Humphery 1832–1835	Succeeded by John Humphery; Daniel Whittle Harvey
Peerage of the United Kingdom
Preceded by Henry Peter Brougham	Baron Brougham and Vaux; 2nd creation 1868–1886	Succeeded by Henry Charles Brougham
