= Laithes =

Hamlet in Cumbria, England

Coordinates: 54.688°N 2.833°W

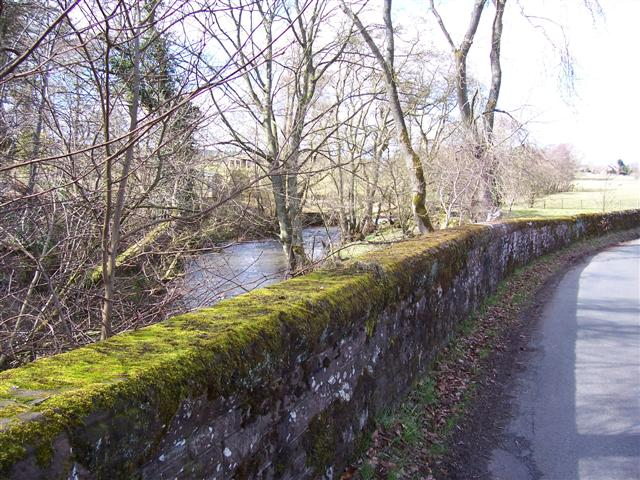
- Beck and bridge at Townend, Laithes

- Location in Eden, Cumbria Location within Cumbria
- OS grid reference: NY463328
- Civil parish: Skelton
- Unitary authority: Westmorland and Furness
- Ceremonial county: Cumbria
- Region: North West
- Country: England
- Sovereign state: United Kingdom
- Post town: PENRITH
- Postcode district: CA11
- Dialling code: 01768
- Police: Cumbria
- Fire: Cumbria
- Ambulance: North West
- UK Parliament: Penrith and Solway

Laithes is a hamlet in the civil parish of Skelton, in the district of Westmorland and Furness district of the English county of Cumbria. Laithes's region is North West. Height is 170.6m.

== See also ==
- Listed buildings in Skelton, Cumbria
- Philip's Street Atlas (page 70)
