= Listed buildings in Skelton, Cumbria =

Skelton is a civil parish in Westmorland and Furness, Cumbria, England. It contains 56 listed buildings that are recorded in the National Heritage List for England. Of these, three are listed at Grade I, the highest of the three grades, three are at Grade II*, the middle grade, and the others are at Grade II, the lowest grade. The parish is mainly rural, and contains a number of villages and smaller settlements, including Skelton, Ellonby, Lamonby, Unthank, Unthank End, Laithes, and Ivegill. Most of the listed buildings are country houses and smaller houses with associated structures, farmhouses and farm buildings. The other listed buildings include churches and structures in the churchyards, a chapel, a bridge, a boundary stone, and a war memorial lych gate.

== Key ==
Grade	Criteria
I	Buildings of exceptional interest, sometimes considered to be internationally important
II*	Particularly important buildings of more than special interest
II	Buildings of national importance and special interest

== Buildings ==
Name and location	Photograph	Date	Notes	Grade
Hardrigg Hall Farmhouse, tower, barn and stables 54.71739°N 2.89447°W	—	14th century	The oldest part is a fortified tower, which is now in ruins, the farmhouse and outbuildings dating from the 19th century. The buildings are in sandstone, with green slate roofs, and two storeys. The house has three bays, a gabled porch, and sash windows in stone surrounds. The barn has three bays and an extension at right angles, giving an L-shaped plan. The remaining walls of the tower are thick, there is the springing of a barrel vault, the base of a stair turret, and two fireplaces, one with a large lintel.	II
St Michael's Church; 54.71068°N 2.87134°W		14th century	The oldest part is the tower, the body of the church was rebuilt in 1794, and the church was restored in 1879. It is built in sandstone, the earlier walls being very thick, with quoins, an eaves cornice, and a green slate roof. The church consists of a nave, a chancel with a north vestry, and a west tower. The tower has three stages, a two-light west window, and a battlemented parapet. On the south wall is a slate sundial.	II
Hutton in the Forest; 54.71399°N 2.83891°W		Late 14th or early 15th century	A country house that originated as a fortified house. A long gallery was added between 1641 and 1645, and the hall range was rebuilt in about 1680. Further alterations took place in 1824, in 1826 George Webster rebuilt the south tower, and in 1862–67 Anthony Salvin made changes and added new buildings. The house is built in sandstone with green slate roofs and battlemented parapets, and it has an irregular plan. The gallery wing has two storeys, five bays and a five-bay extension, and the tower has three storeys. The main block has 2 1/2 storeys, cross-mullioned windows with cornices or pediments, and a pilastered parapet with urn finials.	I
Scales Hall and barn 54.75163°N 2.89315°W	—	Late 15th or early 16th century	The barn was added in the late 16th century, and there were further additions and alterations in the 17th and 19th centuries. The building is all in sandstone, the early part of the house and the barn being partly fortified, with very thick walls. The house has a green slate roof with coped gables and ball finials. There are two storeys, four bays and single-bay cross-wings, giving an H-shaped plan. The doorway has a chamfered surround, and the windows vary, some being mullioned and others are sashes or casements. At the rear on the left is the barn with two storeys and four bays.	II
Former barn, Hardrigg Hall; 54.71710°N 2.89389°W	—	16th century (possible)	The former barn is in stone with a roof partly of slate and partly stone-flagged, and with a stone ridge. There are two storeys and six bays. It contains a large cart entrance, a small door, and two infilled cart entrances. Inside are five full cruck trusses.	II
Tudor west wing, High Head Castle; 54.78143°N 2.93075°W	—	Mid 16th century	The wing was partly damaged by fire in 1956, and is now in ruins and roofless. It is built with thick red sandstone walls and has an eaves cornice and a parapet. There are two storeys and five bays. It contains one open doorway, two doorways that have been converted into windows, and the other windows have chamfered surrounds, some of them are mullioned.	II*
Gatehouse and curtain wall, Scales Hall; 54.75179°N 2.89304°W	—	Late 16th century	The gatehouse and curtain wall are in sandstone, with some brick rebuilding at the rear of the gatehouse. The gatehouse has two storeys and a green slate roof with coped gables and shaped finials. It contains a segmental-headed through archway with roll moulding, above which is a mullioned window with a hood mould. The curtain wall slopes down from a higher level and is battlemented.	I
Lamonby Hall; 54.70522°N 2.91076°W	—	Late 16th or early 17th century	A rendered sandstone house with a green slate roof. It has 2 1/2 storeys and three bays. The windows are inserted casements, and there are some blocked windows.	II
Linton Gill; 54.78193°N 2.91150°W	—	Mid 17th century or earlier	A farmhouse and farm building in stone on a plinth in a linear plan, with quoins and stone surrounds to the openings. The house has a roof of stone-slate, two storeys and two bays and an outshut. The outbuilding has a roof of Welsh slate with stone-slate eaves courses. There is a single storey with a loft and two doors with chamfered surrounds on the front, and above are loft doors.	II
Linton Gill Farmhouse, dairy and barn 54.78237°N 2.91130°W	—	Late 17th century	The farmhouse was extended in 1725. The building is in sandstone, and has roofs of Welsh slate and some red sandstone.. There are two storeys, the house has three bays, with a single-bay former dairy and a lower barn to the left. The doorway has an alternate block surround, the windows in the ground floor are mullioned, and in the upper floor they are casements with chamfered surrounds. In the dairy is a doorway with an alternate block surround, a dated lintel, and a casement window, and the barn has a large cart entrance. Inside the house is an inglenook.	II
Garden wall and gateway, Hutton in the Forest; 54.71433°N 2.83839°W	—	Late 17th century	The garden walls and gate piers are in pink sandstone. The piers are square and rusticated, and have cherub finials. These are flanked by low walls that have pilasters rising above the coping. The gates are wooden, dating from the 20th century.	I
Laundry Cottage; 54.71214°N 2.84159°W	—	1675	The house, which was extended in the early 20th century, is built in a mix of slate and sandstone, and has a Welsh slate roof with a bottom course of sandstone slate. There are two storeys and two bays, with a single-bay single-storey extension to the left. The original doorway has been blocked and a sash window inserted, and it has an architrave and an initialled and dated lintel. The doorway is in the extension, and the windows are sashes, those in the original part having chamfered surrounds.	II
High Head Chapel; 54.78359°N 2.92721°W	—	1682	Originally the private chapel for High Head Castle, it has been converted into a private house. The building is in sandstone, partly rendered, and has a green slate roof with a cross finial at the east end and an open bellcote on the west gable. It has a long rectangular plan, and has a doorway and windows with pointed heads, and one mullioned window.	II
Unthank Farmhouse and barns 54.71589°N 2.85055°W	—	1685	The farmhouse and barns are in a mix of sandstone and cobble. The house has a Welsh slate roof, two storeys and three bays. The door and sash windows have chamfered surrounds. There is a barn to the right, and another barn with three bays at right angles to the left, giving an L-shaped plan. The barns have sandstone slate roofs, the right barn has doors, loft doors and sash windows; the left barn has a segmental cart entrance, doors and a loft doorway.	II
Barn, Home Farm; 54.71149°N 2.84233°W	—	Late 17th or early 18th century	The barn is in a mix of sandstone and cobble. and has a green slate roof. There are two storeys and three bays. It contains a door in a stone surround, windows, one of which is mullioned, ventilation slits, and a rear cart entrance.	II
Dovecote, Hutton in the Forest; 54.71574°N 2.83855°W		Late 17th to early 18th century	The dovecote is in sandstone with a green slate roof surmounted by a rebuilt wooden lantern. It has an octagonal plan, and the door and a small opening have chamfered surrounds. Inside are the original boulins and a revolving potence.	II
Lamonby House and barns 54.71580°N 2.91906°W	—	1703	The farmhouse and barns are in sandstone and have green slate roofs with coped gables. The house is on a chamfered plinth, and has quoins, a string course, and eaves modillions. There are two storeys, three bays, and a lower single-bay extension to the right. The doorway has a pilastered surround and a segmental pediment, and the windows are casements. To the rear is a barn with an L-shaped plan that has plank doors and loft doorways with stone surrounds.	II
St James' Church; 54.72008°N 2.84066°W		1714	The church is built on the site of a medieval church, and was restored and altered by Anthony Salvin in 1867–68. It is in pink and grey sandstone on a chamfered plinth, and has a green slate roof with coped gables and a cross finial. The church consists of a nave, a chancel with a north vestry, and on the west gable is a twin open bellcote. There are two doorways with Tudor arched heads, and windows in Tudor style. Built into the north wall is a 9th-century cross-shaft.	II
Yew Tree House and barns 54.71343°N 2.87590°W	—	1714	Barns were added to the left of the house in the early 19th century. The buildings are in stone and have green slate roofs with coped gables. The house has two storeys, three bays (originally five), a rear outshut, and a doorway with a dated and initialled stone surround. The windows are sashes in stone architraves, and there are also blocked windows. The barns are in two levels and have doorways and other openings.	II
The Beeches and barn 54.71160°N 2.91655°W	—	Early 18th century	The farmhouse and barn are in grey and pink sandstone on a chamfered plinth, with a white sandstone string course. quoins, an eaves cornice, and a green slate roof with coped gables. The house has two storeys, five bays, a door with pilasters and a segmental pediment, and sash windows in white sandstone surrounds. The barn to the left has an outshut with a dated door, another door, external steps leading to a loft door, and ventilation slits.	II
Chapel Cottage; 54.71250°N 2.87524°W	—	Early 18th century	A stone house with a green slate roof, two storeys, three bays, and an extension to the left. In the original part the windows are casements and horizontally-sliding sashes in chamfered stone surrounds, and in the extension they are sashes in plain stone surrounds. At the rear are two plank doors in stone surrounds.	II
Clark's Farm and stables 54.71554°N 2.91862°W	—	Early 18th century	The house is in red sandstone on a chamfered plinth, with quoins, an eaves cornice, and a roof of Welsh and green slate with coped gables. There are two storeys, three bays, an extension to the left, single-bay stables to the right, and a rear outshut. The windows are sashes, the stable has a door with a stone surround, and there is another door and a loft doorway, both with alternate block surrounds.	II
Crown Farmhouse and barns 54.71962°N 2.85920°W	—	Early 18th century	The farmhouse and barns are in red sandstone and calciferous sandstone. The house has a green slate roof, the barn roof is in sandstone slate, and the barn extension has a corrugated asbestos roof. The house has quoins, two storeys, four bays, a doorway with a quoined surround and a cornice. The windows are sashes and firewindows. The barn to the left has ventilation slits and a small window, and in the extension is a segmental-arched doorway and loft doors. At the rear, external steps lead to a loft door.	II
Home Farmhouse and former stables 54.71096°N 2.84188°W	—	Early 18th century	The farmhouse and the former stables, which have been incorporated into the house, are in mixed sandstone and cobbles, and there is a green slate roof. The house has two storeys and five bays, and a central doorway with a stone architrave and a broken segmental pediment. Above the door is an oval window, and the other windows are sashes in stone surrounds.	II
Rushgill House; 54.73793°N 2.92454°W	—	Early 18th century	A farmhouse in pink sandstone with quoins in calciferous sandstone and a roof in green slate with some red sandstone. There are two storeys, five bays and a 19th-century outshut. The windows are mullioned, and inside the house are two inglenooks.	II
Wharton Bridge; 54.77908°N 2.90852°W	—	Early 18th century (probable)	Originally a packhorse bridge, later used as a footbridge, it is in sandstone, and consists of a single arch. The bridge is narrow with a hump back, and has a solid irregular parapet.	II
Eighteen century wing, High Head Castle; 54.78140°N 2.93056°W		1744–47	A country house that was badly damaged by fire in 1956, and is now roofless. It is built in red sandstone with quoins, a string course, eaves modillions, and an open balustraded parapet. There are two storeys and eleven bays. The central three bays project forward and contain a central doorway with alternate block surround, an entablature, and a pediment containing an ornament. The windows have stone architraves.	II*
Garden gate, piers and wall, High Head Castle; 54.78162°N 2.93056°W		1744–47	The wall and gate piers in front of the building are in red sandstone ashlar with calciferous sandstone dressings. In the centre are two square rusticated gate piers that have paired engaged fluted Ionic columns at the front, pilastered niches at the rear, and are surmounted by shaped caps. These are flanked by low walls with moulded flat coping, and at the ends are rusticated piers.	II*
The Arches, The Arches Cottage, The Barn and gingang 54.78176°N 2.93128°W	—	1747	These originated as the stable range, a barn and a gin gang for High Head Castle, and have been converted into four dwellings. They are in sandstone with quoins, and have hipped roofs of Welsh slate with a bottom course of sandstone slate. The buildings form four sides of a courtyard, and have two or three storeys. Features include a semicircular former gin gang, a segmental archway with voussoirs, and coped gables with ball finials. The houses have doorways and sash windows, some of which are mullioned, all with quoined surrounds and keyed lintels.	II
Grassnop and barns 54.72569°N 2.84050°W	—	Mid 18th century	A farmhouse and barns in sandstone with green slate roofs. The house has two storeys, three bays, a doorway with a stone surround, and mullioned windows. To the left are barns with an L-shaped plan that have plank doors, ventilation slits, and two large projecting cart entrances.	II
Gate piers, The Lodge, High Head Castle; 54.78768°N 2.93251°W	—	Mid 18th century	The gate piers are at the entrance to the drive. They are square, in red sandstone ashlar, and have shaped caps and ball finials.	II
Pringle House and barns 54.71652°N 2.90513°W	—	Mid 18th century	The farmhouse is rendered and has a Welsh slate roof, two storeys and three bays. The central doorway and sash windows have stone surrounds. To the left of the house is a single-bay barn, and to the right is a two-bay barn, both lower than the house. They are in sandstone, and have roofs of Welsh and green slate. The left barn has a central projecting cart entrance, and the right barn has a segmental-arched doorway, flat-headed doorways and a window, all in stone surrounds.	II
Wood End Farmhouse and barn 54.73360°N 2.91803°W	—	Mid 18th century	The farmhouse incorporates part of an earlier house. Its front is in pink sandstone and calciferous sandstone, the gables, the rear, and the barn are in brick, partly pebbledashed, and the roofs are in green slate. The house is on a chamfered plinth, it has quoins, a string course, an eaves cornice, two storeys and three bays. The central doorway has an architrave, a bolection frieze and a pediment, and sash windows in stone surrounds. The barn to the left is lower, and partly converted for domestic use. It contains a central segmental-headed cart entrance with an alternate block surround, a casement window, a loft door and, at the rear, a projecting cart entrance and brick vents in a cross shape.	II
Ive Bank; 54.77862°N 2.90836°W	—	Late 18th century	A roughcast house with a green slate roof. There are two storeys, two bays, and a two-storey single-bay extension. The doorway and sash windows have stone surrounds.	II
Unthank Hall; 54.71626°N 2.85176°W	—	Late 18th century	The farmhouse was extended in 1838. It is stuccoed at the front and sides and pebbledashed at the rear, and has red sandstone quoins and a green slate roof. There are two storeys, the original part has two bays and a double span, and the extension is at right angles with three bays, forming an L-shaped plan. The doorway has a stone surround and a fanlight, and the windows are sashes. At the rear of the original part is a round-headed staircase window.	II
Unthank House and former barns 54.71975°N 2.86407°W	—	Late 18th century	Originally a farmhouse with barns, these were later combined into a private house. The house is roughcast, the former barns are in sandstone, and all have green slate roofs. The house has two storeys, four bays, and a single-storey single-bay extension to the left. There is a Tuscan prostyle porch and sash windows, and in the extension is a doorway with a pediment. To the right of the house are L-shaped former barns that contain sash windows and doorways, one of which has a segmental head.	II
Whitrigg; 54.71556°N 2.82074°W	—	Late 18th century	A sandstone farmhouse with quoins, a string course, and a green slate roof with coped gables. It has two storeys, three bays and a rear extension. The doorway has a quoined surround, a keyed lintel, and a hood. The windows are sashes in stone surrounds.	II
Barn northeast of Whitrigg; 54.71578°N 2.82062°W	—	Late 18th century	The barn is in mixed sandstone and cobble with quoins and a green slate roof with coped gables. It has two storeys, seven bays, two doorways with alternate block surrounds, two segmental-arched openings with keyed voussoirs, external steps leading to a loft door, and an oval vent.	II
Barn northwest of Whitrigg; 54.71566°N 2.82110°W	—	Late 18th century	The barn is in mixed sandstone and cobble with quoins and a green slate roof with coped gables. It has a loft, cart entrances, ventilation slits, an oval gable vent, plank doors in quoined surrounds, and a loft doorway.	II
Entrance gateway and walls, Hutton in the Forest; 54.71591°N 2.84039°W	—	Late 18th or early 19th century	Flanking the entrance to the drive are tall square gate piers in pink sandstone. They are rusticated with shaped caps and ball finial[]s. Outside them are serpentine walls with saddle-back coping, ending in piers without rustication.	II
Roadside walls northwest of Hutton in the Forest; 54.71618°N 2.84063°W	—	Late 18th or early 19th century	The road is flanked by low pink sandstone walls with chamfered coping. Towards the junction they are serpentine and have end piers that have shaped caps and ball finials.	II
Roehill; 54.78745°N 2.94120°W	—	1811	A farmhouse in red sandstone and calciferous sandstone with quoins and a green slate roof. The right return wall is slate hung. There are two storeys and five bays. The central doorway has an alternate block surround and a keyed lintel, and the windows are sashes in stone surrounds. In the left return wall is another door, and this is flanked by blind windows.	II
Boundary stone 54.74774°N 2.85619°W	—	Early 19th century	The parish boundary stone is in red sandstone, and consists of a square stone with a pyramidal top. There are inscriptions on the two faces.	II
Servants' wing, High Head Castle; 54.78158°N 2.93075°W	—	Early 19th century	The wing is in red sandstone with quoins and a green slate roof with coped gables and ball finials. There are two storeys and four bays, and the windows are sashes. In the right return is a doorway, in the left return is a round opening in the upper floor, and at the rear is an open pediment.	II
Barn, Hutton Grange; 54.73051°N 2.83536°W	—	Early 19th century	A sandstone barn with quoins and a green slate roof. There is a single storey and two bays. In the centre is a round-arched cart entrance flanked by plank doors, all in stone surrounds. There are also ventilation slits, and an extension to the left with a round-arched doorway.	II
Courtyard walls and stable ranges, Hutton in the Forest; 54.71455°N 2.83899°W	—	Early 19th century	Designed by Anthony Salvin, these consist of two parallel stable ranges and walls enclosing a courtyard, all in sandstone. The stable ranges have quoins and green slate roofs with coped gables and ball finials. They have two storeys and each has four bays, and they contain mullioned windows and segmental archways. The walls are partly battlemented, and the outer courtyard wall contains a segmental-arched doorway with a pediment, a shield of arms, and ball finials.	II
Former entrance gates and walls, Hutton in the Forest; 54.71513°N 2.83278°W	—	Early 19th century	There are two pairs of piers flanking the entrances, two end piers, and low walls, all in sandstone. The piers are square and rusticated on chamfered plinths, and have moulded caps and ball finials. The walls have a serpentine shape with chamfered copings, they are stepped, and extend beyond the end piers.	II
Hutton Grange; 54.73066°N 2.83530°W	—	1832	A red sandstone house with quoins, an eaves cornice, and a hipped green slate roof. There are two storeys and three bays. In the centre is a prostyle Ionic porch, and a doorway with a fanlight, and the windows are sashes in stone surrounds.	II
Wall and gateways, St James' churchyard 54.72001°N 2.84101°W	—	Mid 19th century	The wall, of mixed sandstone and cobble with chamfered coping, surrounds four sides of the churchyard. The gateway on the path to Hutton Hall is in Penrith sandstone, and has a round Neo-Norman arch with engaged columns, zigzag caps, and a pendant with a coat of arms. At the entrance to the churchyard is a plain stone gateway.	II
Coach House, Unthank Hall; 54.71627°N 2.85214°W	—	Mid 19th century	The coach house is in red sandstone with quoins and a green slate roof. There is a single storey with a loft, in the rear gable is a segmental-arched entrance, and in both gables is a small round-headed window.	II
Gate piers, Unthank Hall; 54.71637°N 2.85186°W	—	Mid 19th century	There are two rusticated gate piers in sandstone. Each pier has a ball finial, one of which is marked as a sundial.	II
Gateway, wall and railings, former entrance to Unthank Hall; 54.71715°N 2.85070°W	—	Mid 19th century	There are two gate piers and two smaller end piers linked by low serpentine walls, all in calciferous sandstone. The piers are square and have chamfered angles and shaped caps. On the walls are cast iron railings.	II
Methodist Church; 54.71285°N 2.87532°W		1865	The church is in mixed pink and grey sandstone, with rendered gables and a Welsh slate roof. It has a single storey and two bays, and the door and casement windows have round heads.	II
Well, Hutton Grange; 54.73101°N 2.83955°W	—	Mid or late 19th century	The well is now filled in but the well head remains. It is in sandstone, and consists of a circular drum with a flat slab head. There is a small opening on the side facing the road.	II
The Old Vicarage; 54.78239°N 2.90273°W	—	1868	The vicarage and combined servants' quarters and parish office were designed by Robert Jewell Withers, and have since been converted into two houses. They are in sandstone with some polychromatic dressings and a Welsh slate roof. The building has an irregular plan, two storeys, gables, a string course, and a canted bay window. Most of the windows are sashes, and there is a mullioned and transomed window containing a coat of arms in stained glass.	II
War memorial lychgate 54.71060°N 2.87194°W	—	1920	The lych gate was built as a war memorial at the entrance to the churchyard of St Michael's Church. At the base are two U-shaped redsandstone gateposts, each containing a timber seat on sandstone corbels. The names of those lost in the World Wars are carved on the north gatepost. On this is a dark oak superstructure carrying a pitched roof of sandstone slates, and on the superstructure are decorative carvings and inscriptions.	II
