= Unthank End =

Hamlet in Cumbria, England

Coordinates: 54.711°N 2.846°W

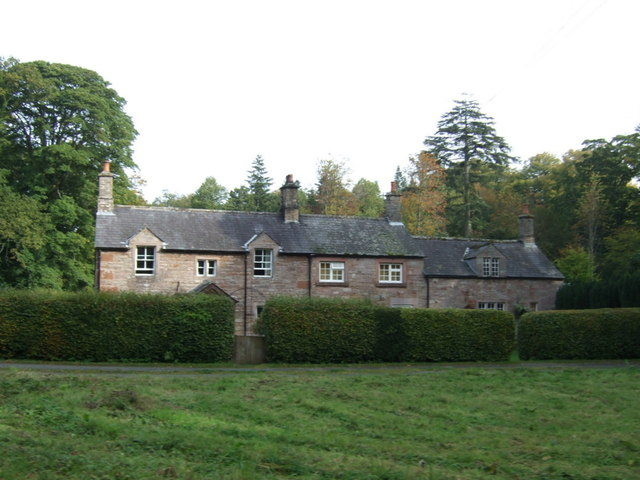
- Cottages, Unthank End

- Location in Eden, Cumbria Location within Cumbria
- OS grid reference: NY454355
- Civil parish: Skelton
- Unitary authority: Westmorland and Furness
- Ceremonial county: Cumbria
- Region: North West
- Country: England
- Sovereign state: United Kingdom
- Post town: PENRITH
- Postcode district: CA11
- Dialling code: 017684
- Police: Cumbria
- Fire: Cumbria
- Ambulance: North West
- UK Parliament: Penrith and Solway

Unthank End is a hamlet in Cumbria, England.

== See also ==
- Listed buildings in Skelton, Cumbria
