= Ellonby =

Hamlet in Cumbria, England

Coordinates: 54.709°N 2.893°W

- Hamlet
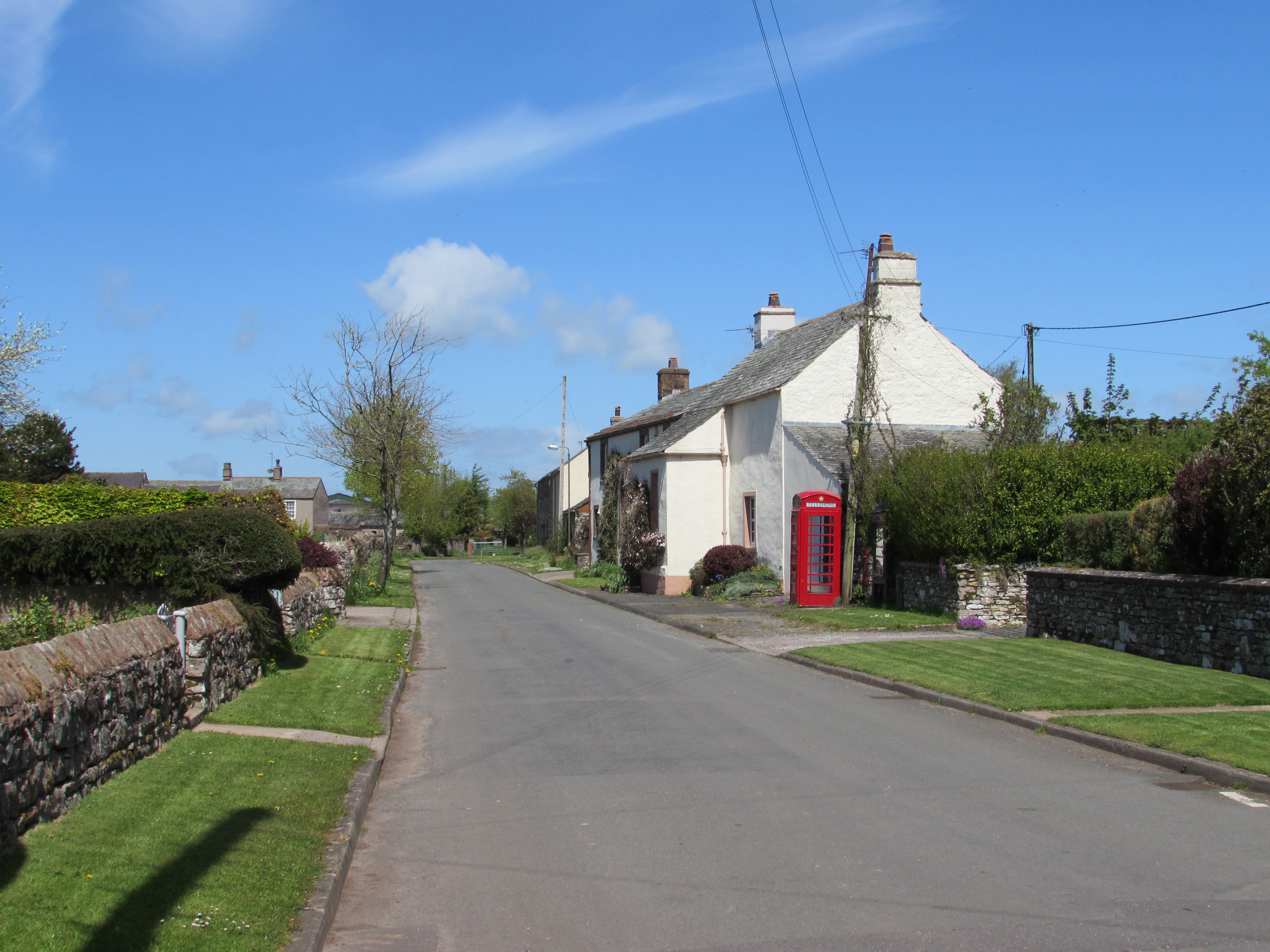
- Ellonby

- Location in the former Eden District Location within Cumbria
- OS grid reference: NY424352
- Civil parish: Skelton
- Unitary authority: Westmorland and Furness
- Ceremonial county: Cumbria
- Region: North West
- Country: England
- Sovereign state: United Kingdom
- Post town: PENRITH
- Postcode district: CA11
- Dialling code: 017684
- Police: Cumbria
- Fire: Cumbria
- Ambulance: North West
- UK Parliament: Penrith and Solway

Ellonby is a hamlet in the parish of Skelton in the Westmorland and Furness district, in the ceremonial county of Cumbria.

To the north of the hamlet, at Hardrigg Hall, a ruined 14th-century pele tower adjoins a 19th-century farmhouse.

== See also ==
- Listed buildings in Skelton, Cumbria
