= Earl of Ypres =

Extinct earldom in the Peerage of the United Kingdom

Earldom of Ypres
- Arms: Ermine, a Chevron Sable, a Crescent for difference. Crest: A Dolphin embowed proper. Supporters: Dexter: A Lion guardant Or, supporting a Staff proper, with a Banner of the Union. Sinister: A Lion Or, supporting a Staff proper, with a Banner paly of three Sable, Gold and Gules.
- Creation date: 5 June 1922
- Creation: First
- Created by: King George V
- Peerage: Peerage of the United Kingdom
- First holder: John French, 1st Viscount French
- Last holder: John French, 3rd Earl of Ypres
- Remainder to: the 1st Earl’s heirs male of the body lawfully begotten
- Subsidiary titles: Viscount French
- Status: Extinct
- Motto: MALO MORI QUAM FŒDARI (I prefer to die than to be dishonoured)

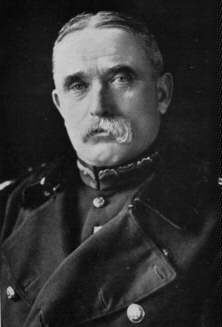
John French, 1st Earl of Ypres.

Earl of Ypres was a title in the Peerage of the United Kingdom. It was a victory title, referring to the Flemish city of Ypres, which gave its name the Salient of Ypres, site of extremely bloody fighting in World War I.

== History ==
It was created on 5 June 1922 for Field Marshal John French, 1st Viscount French. He was Chief of the Imperial General Staff from 1912 to 1914, Commander of the British Expeditionary Force in the First World War from 1914 to 1915 and Lord-Lieutenant of Ireland from 1919 to 1922. French had already been created Viscount French, of Ypres and of High Lake in the County of Roscommon (in Connacht, Ireland), on 1 January 1916. The viscountcy was also in the Peerage of the United Kingdom.

He was succeeded by his son John Richard Lowndes French, the second Earl, who was a Captain in the Royal Field Artillery, as well as a talented artist.

On his death, the titles passed to his son John Richard Charles Lambart French, the third Earl. He fought in the Second World War as a Captain in the King's Royal Rifle Corps. The family's wealth had decreased; he was employed as a hall porter in a Chelsea mansion block, nevertheless maintaining "a Monty Pythonesque sense of humour about his predicament". Lord Ypres had four daughters but no sons, so on his death in 1988 his titles became extinct.

Other notable members of the family were the suffragette and writer Charlotte Despard, the elder sister of the first Earl, and Lady Lucy French, youngest daughter of the third Earl, who became a prominent journalist and has done extensive work for charity and fundraising for the arts, most notably for Regent’s Park Open Air Theatre.

== Earls of Ypres (1922–1988) ==
- John Denton Pinkstone French, 1st Earl of Ypres (1852–1925)
- John Richard Lowndes French, 2nd Earl of Ypres (1881–1958)
- John Richard Charles Lambart French, 3rd Earl of Ypres (1921–1988)
