= Marie Blaze de Bury =

Scottish writer and salonniere (1813–1894)

- Born: 1813; Oban
- Died: 1894 (aged 80–81)
- Occupation: political writer
- Spouse: Henri Blaze de Bury

Marie Blaze de Bury or Baroness Rose Blaze de Bury or Marie Pauline Rose Blaze de Bury; published as Hamilton Murray; and Arthur Dudley (1813–1894) was a Scottish-born political writer and salonniere. She was notably opposed to the rule of Napoleon and there were reports that she was an agent for Austria or England.

== Life ==
Bury was born in Oban in about 1813. Her parent or guardian was an army officer named William Stuart, but one rumour was that her father was the transforming statesman Lord Henry Brougham. Her last name was Stuart or Stewart. When she was nine she was sent to France where she completed her education.

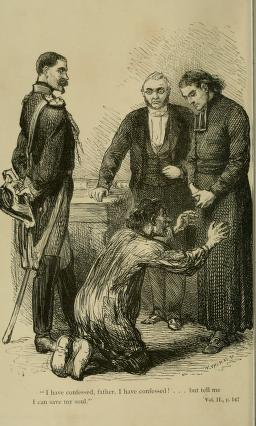
Illustration from All for Greed (1868)

She used the nom de plume of the English-sounding name of "Arthur Dudley" and her work nearly always contained a political aspect. She wrote in French, English and German. It was said that she may have been an agent for Austria or England but this is not substantiated. She was strongly opposed to the rule of Napoleon. She wrote Mildred Vernon; a tale of Parisian life in the last days of the monarchy under the pseudonym Hamilton Murray in 1848. In the following year she wrote Léonie Vermont: A Story of the Present Time which was another three volume novel. The next three volume novel was Falkenburg: A Tale of the Rhine which was published in 1851.

Her works include Travel to Austria, Hungary and Germany During the Events of 1848 and 1849 which was published in 1851. In 1852 she published the biography and letters of the 17th century philosopher Princess Palatine.

She wrote for the magazine Once a Week about the Salons of Paris. She also wrote for Revue du Des Mondes and Blackwood's Magazine.

In 1868 her novel All for Greed was published in two volumes. In the following year she published her novel, All for Love.

== Private life ==
In 1844 she married the writer Henri Blaze de Bury who she had met in 1840. They lived in Paris. When she died in 1894 an obituary published in The Times noted her skills which set her apart from other talented women.

== Bibliography ==
- Racine and the French classical drama (1845)
- Molière, and the French classical drama (1846)
- Germania; its courts, camps, and people (1850)
- Voyage en Autriche en Hongrie et en Allemagne pendant les événements de 1848 et 1849 (1851)
- All for greed (1868)
- Love the avenger (1869)
- Bryon et Shelley; un mot sur le centenaire de Shelley (1892)

As Hamilton Murray:

- Mildred Vernon; a tale of Parisian life in the last days of the monarchy (1848)
- Léonie Vermont : a story of the present time (1849)
- Falkenburg; a tale of the Rhine (1860)
