= Henry Brougham, 3rd Baron Brougham and Vaux =

British aristocrat and civil servant

The Right Honourable The Lord Brougham and Vaux KCVO JP DL
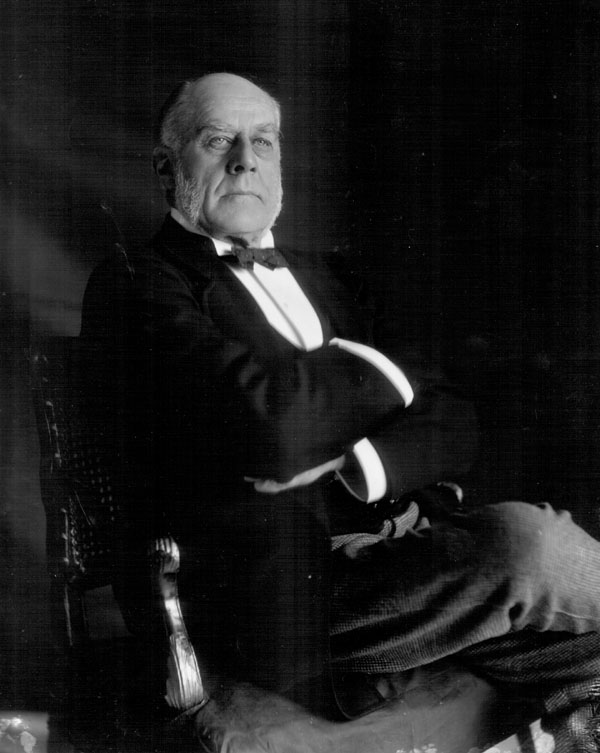
- Brougham in 1906

Member of the House of Lords
- Lord Temporal
- In office 3 January 1886 – 24 May 1927
- Preceded by: The 2nd Baron Brougham and Vaux
- Succeeded by: The 4th Baron Brougham and Vaux

Personal details
- Born: Henry Charles Brougham; 2 September 1836
- Died: 24 May 1927 (aged 90)
- Spouse: Adora Frances Olga Wells (m. 1882; died 1925)
- Children: 2
- Parent(s): William Brougham, 2nd Baron Brougham and Vaux; Emily Frances Taylor
- Education: Eton College; Trinity College, Cambridge

Henry Charles Brougham, 3rd Baron Brougham and Vaux (2 September 1836 – 24 May 1927), was a British aristocrat and civil servant.

Brougham was the son of William Brougham, 2nd Baron Brougham and Vaux, and Emily Frances Taylor, daughter of Sir Charles Taylor, 1st Baronet. Lord Chancellor Henry Brougham, 1st Baron Brougham and Vaux, was his uncle. He was educated at Eton and Trinity College, Cambridge.

He spent time in India and had an Indian wife, presumably common-law, who bore him a daughter Agnes Brougham, 1875–1930. (Agnes married Charles Creagh, an Anglo Indian Army officer, father James Creagh, and uncle O'Moore Creagh VC, later the head of the Indian Army.)

In 1857 Brougham was appointed a Clerk to the House of Lords, a position he held until 1886, when he succeeded his father in the barony and was himself able to take a seat in the upper chamber of parliament. However, he never spoke in the House of Lords. In 1905 he was made a KCVO.

Lord Brougham and Vaux married Adora Frances Olga, Lady Musgrave (née Wells), daughter of Peter Wells, of Windsor Forest and Great Park, and widow of Sir Richard Musgrave, 11th Baronet, in 1882. They had one son and one daughter. She died in December 1925. Lord Brougham and Vaux survived her by less than two years and died in May 1927, aged 90, only 20 days after the death of his only son, Henry. He was succeeded in the barony by his grandson, Victor.

== Arms ==
Coat of arms of Henry Brougham, 3rd Baron Brougham and Vaux
Crest A dexter arm in armour embowed Proper the hand holding a lucy fessewise Argent and charged on the elbow with a rose Gules. Escutcheon Gules a chevron between three lucies hauriant Argent. Supporters Dexter a lion Vert armed and langued Gules gorged with a vaux collar checky Or and of the second, sinister a stag Argent attired and unguled Or holding in the mouth a rose Gules barbed and seeded Vert. Motto Pro Rege Lege Grege (For The King The Law And The People)

Peerage of the United Kingdom
Preceded by William Brougham	Baron Brougham and Vaux; 2nd creation 1886–1927; Member of the House of Lords (1886–1927)	Succeeded by Victor Brougham
