= Henry Brougham (divine) =

English cleric (1665–1696)

Henry Brougham (1665–1696) was an English cleric.

== Life ==
Brougham was one of the twelve children of Henry Brougham of Scales Hall, Cumberland, sheriff for the county in the 6th of William III, by his marriage with ' fair Miss Slee, daughter of Mr. Slee of Carlisle, a jovial gentleman,' who was a merchant in that city. In Midsummer term, 1681, when sixteen years old, Henry Brougham 'became a poor serving-child of Queen's College,' Oxford. He proceeded B.A. in 1685, M.A. in 1689, being afterwards tabarder and fellow. On 29 Sept. 1691 he was collated, and on 30 Sept. was installed prebend of Asgarby in the church of Lincoln. He was, with William Offley, domestic chaplain to Thomas Barlow, the bishop. On Barlow's death in the same year he bequeathed his Greek, Latin, and English Bibles, and his own original manuscripts, to Brougham and Offley. A condition of the gift was that Brougham and Offley were not to make public any of his writings after his decease; and in 1692, on Sir Peter Pett publishing what he called the bishop's 'Genuine Remains,' the two legatees 'delay'd no time' in issuing a vindication, calling Sir Peter Pett and the vicar of Buckden (where the bishop had died) 'confederate pedlars.' The title of this vindication of their master was 'Reflections to (sic) a late Book entituled The Genuine Remains of Dr. Tho. Barlow, late Bishop of Lincoln, Falsely pretended to be published from his lordship's Original Papers.' It was written by Henry Brougham, and was published in 1694, with a list of Socinian writers (Latin), declared to be the bishop's real list, annexed.

From 1693 to 1695 Brougham acted as pro-proctor for the university; and on 29 March 1696, he died at Oxford, and was buried in Queen's College chapel.
