= Essex Leila Hilary French =

English socialite (1907–1996)

Essex Leila Hilary Eyres-Monsell, Viscountess Monsell (formerly Drury, née French; 26 September 1907 – March 1996) was an English socialite. She and her sister Valerie Violet French were known as the "French sisters" and included in The Book of Beauty by Cecil Beaton.

== Biography ==
Essex Leila Hilary French was born on 26 September 1907, at Dundee, Natal, South Africa, the first daughter of English cricketer Lt Col the Hon Edward Gerald Fleming French DSO (1883-1970), Deputy Governor of Dartmoor Prison and Governor of Newcastle Prison and Leila Elizabeth Fyfe King (d. 1959), daughter of Robert King, of Natal, South Africa. Her grandfather was Field Marshal John French, 1st Earl of Ypres (1852-1925), Commander-in-Chief of the British Expeditionary Force in World War I.

In the 1920s, Essex French attended St James's School, a contemporary of Joan Leigh Fermor, who detested her.

On 30 July 1929 Essex Leila Hilary French married Captain Vyvyan Dru Drury, of Castle Kevin, Annamoe, co. Wicklow, son of Francis Saxham Elwes Drury. Their daughter Romayne Drury (b. 1930) married Vittorio Giorgini. Essex French and Vyvyan Drury divorced in 1936.

In 1930 she was included, together with her sister, in The Book of Beauty by Cecil Beaton: "'Sugar and spice and all that's nice' - that’s what the French sisters are made of. [...] Essex, pink and white, with raven hair, as silky as a spaniel’s, and fear-like periwinkle eyes, is the most graceful in movement. [...] They are an unmodern pair of sisters, of a picture-calendar loveliness, a triumph of the chocolate box: it is easy to look interesting, and so difficult to be triumphantly pretty. They are very English, and when for a time, in chintz aprons, they sold flowers in Nellie Taylor’s olde worlde shoppe, every young man entering to buy a gardenia or a bunch of mignonette thought himself suddenly transported to the celestial regions, to a heaven designed in all its wholehearted prettiness by Maud Goodman."

On 25 July 1950 she married Bolton Eyres-Monsell, 1st Viscount Monsell.

She died in March 1996 at her home 78 Whitehall Court, London.
