= Valerie French (socialite) =

English socialite (1909–97)

Violet Valerie Kindersley
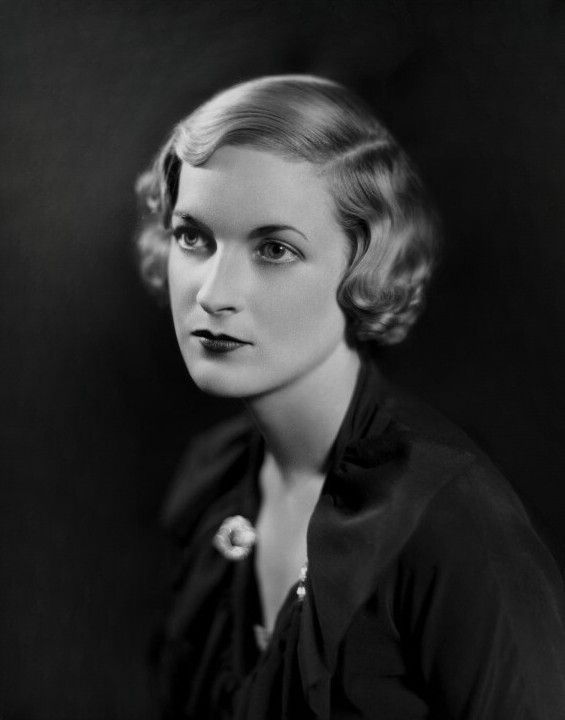
- French in 1934
- Born: Violet Valerie French; 13 February 1909; Pietermaritzburg, Colony of Natal (now KwaZulu-Natal, South Africa)
- Died: 18 July 1997 (aged 88); Swindon, Wiltshire, England
- Other name: Violet Valerie Kindersley
- Occupation: Socialite
- Spouses: Victor Brougham, 4th Baron Brougham and Vaux (m. 1931; div. 1934) Hon. Philip Leyland Kindersley (m. 1936; died 1995)
- Children: 4
- Parent(s): Edward Gerald Fleming French; Leila Elizabeth Fyfe King
- Relatives: Essex Leila Hilary French (sister); John French, 1st Earl of Ypres (grandfather)

Violet Valerie Kindersley (13 February 1909 – 18 July 1997), née French, and known from 1931 to 1934 as Lady Brougham and Vaux, was a Natal-born English socialite. She and her sister Essex were known as the "French sisters" and included in The Book of Beauty by Cecil Beaton.

== Biography ==
Violet Valerie French was born on 13 February 1909 at Pietermaritzburg, Natal, South Africa, the daughter of English cricketer Lt Col the Hon Edward Gerald Fleming French (1883–1970), Deputy Governor of Dartmoor Prison and Governor of Newcastle Prison, and Leila Elizabeth Fyfe King (d. 1959), daughter of Robert King, of Natal, South Africa. Her grandfather was John French, 1st Earl of Ypres.

In 1930, she was included, together with her sister, in The Book of Beauty by Cecil Beaton, which documented the "Bright Young Things" socialites of the 1920s. Beaton wrote: "Valerie, pink and white like sugar-coated almonds, with slow, brown eyes and pale corn-coloured hair, has the more flawless face. Her nose is perfection."

She died on 18 July 1997, in Swindon, Wiltshire, England.

== Marriages ==
In 1926, she was engaged to Henry Bradley Martin, a Manhattan socialite. In 1929, she rushed to the United States to assist him after he was injured in an automobile accident in Colorado. The engagement was subsequently broken.

On 21 April 1931, she married Victor Brougham, 4th Baron Brougham and Vaux. They had one son, Julian Henry Peter Brougham (1932–1952), who was killed while on active service in Malaya in 1952, aged 19. They divorced in 1934.

On 26 November 1936, she married Captain Hon. Philip Leyland Kindersley (1907–1995), fourth son of Robert Kindersley, 1st Baron Kindersley and Gladys Margaret Beadle. They had three children: Nicoletta Leila Kindersley (b. 1939), Virginia Alexandra de L'Estang Kindersley (b. 1943), and Christian Philip Kindersley (b. 1950).
