= John French, 2nd Earl of Ypres =

British peer

Coat of arms of the Earl of Ypres

John Richard Lowndes French, 2nd Earl of Ypres (6 July 1881 – 5 April 1958) was the son of the British field marshal and the first commander of the British Expeditionary Force (BEF) in World War I Sir John French.

He was born near Morpeth in Northumberland where his father was stationed. Early in his career, he served in the British North Borneo Constabulary. Later, he followed his father by joining the army and he served with the Royal Field Artillery, where he earned the Distinguished Service Order. His military career was cut short following a riding accident. French was also a talented artist, something which did not endear him to his father.

He succeeded his father as 2nd Earl of Ypres following his death on 22 May 1925. During the Second World War he commanded a battalion of the Home Guard. He was succeeded by his son John.

Peerage of the United Kingdom
Preceded by Sir John French	Earl of Ypres; 1925–1958	Succeeded by John French
