= Henry Brougham, 1st Baron Brougham and Vaux =

British Lord High Chancellor (1778–1868)

The Right Honourable The Lord Brougham and Vaux PC FRS
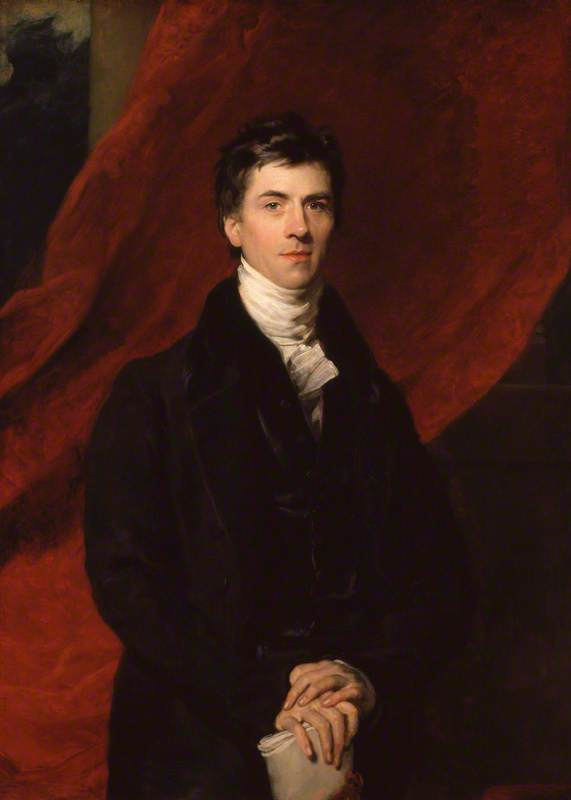
- Portrait of Henry Brougham by Thomas Lawrence, 1825

Lord Chancellor
- In office 22 November 1830 – 21 November 1834
- Monarch: William IV
- Prime Minister: The Earl Grey; The Viscount Melbourne
- Preceded by: The Lord Lyndhurst
- Succeeded by: The Lord Lyndhurst

Member of the House of Lords Lord Temporal
- In office 22 November 1830 – 7 May 1868; Hereditary peerage
- Preceded by: Peerage created
- Succeeded by: The 2nd Lord Brougham and Vaux

Member of Parliament for Knaresborough
- In office February 1830 – August 1830
- Preceded by: George Tierney
- Succeeded by: Henry Cavendish

Member of Parliament for Winchelsea
- In office 1815 – February 1830
- Preceded by: William Vane
- Succeeded by: John Williams

Member of Parliament for Camelford
- In office 1810 – November 1812
- Preceded by: Lord Henry Petty
- Succeeded by: Samuel Scott

Personal details
- Born: Henry Peter Brougham; 19 September 1778 Cowgate, Edinburgh
- Died: 7 May 1868 (aged 89) Cannes, Second French Empire
- Party: Whig
- Spouse(s): Mary Anne Eden (1785–1865)
- Children: 2
- Parent(s): Henry Brougham; Eleanora Syme
- Education: University of Edinburgh

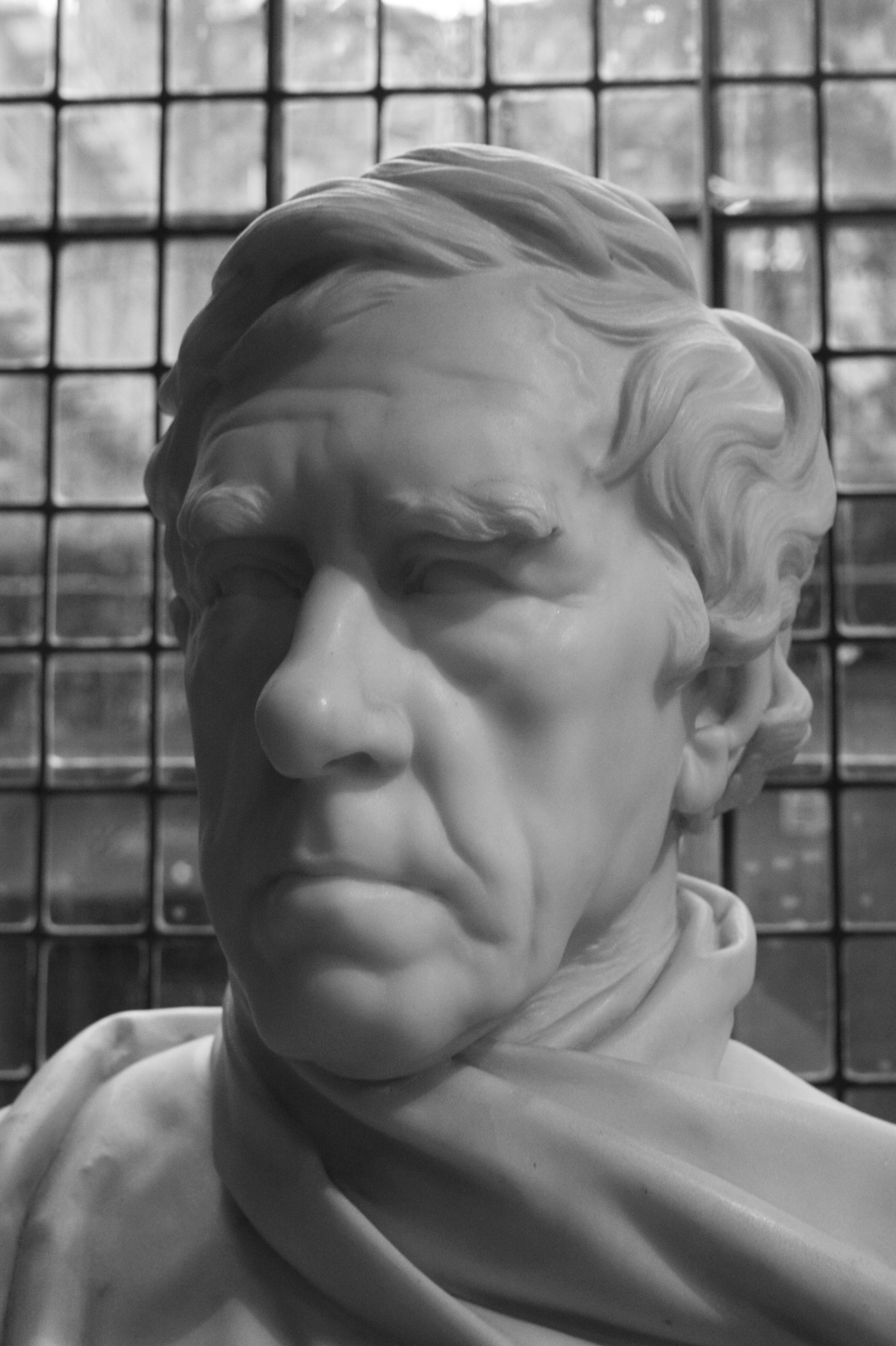
Sir Henry Brougham by John Adams Acton 1867

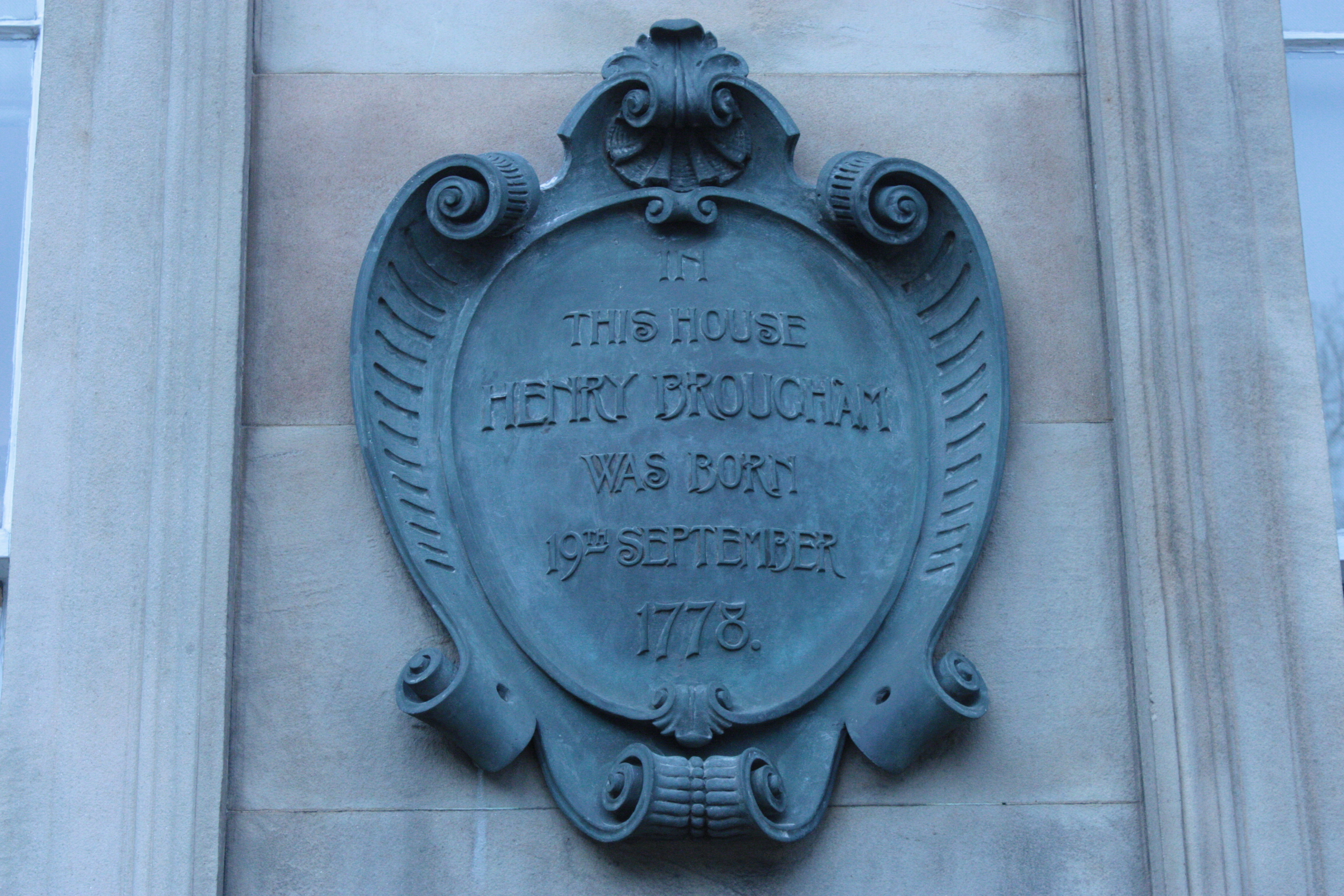
Plaque to Henry Brougham's birthplace, St Andrew Square, Edinburgh

Henry Peter Brougham, 1st Baron Brougham and Vaux, PC, FRS (/ˈbruː(ə)m ... ˈvoʊks/; 19 September 1778 – 7 May 1868) was a British statesman who became Lord High Chancellor of Great Britain and played a prominent role in passing the Reform Act 1832 and Slavery Abolition Act 1833.

Born in Edinburgh, Brougham helped found the Edinburgh Review in 1802 before moving to London, where he qualified as a barrister in 1808. Elected to the House of Commons in 1810 as a Whig, he was Member of Parliament for various constituencies until becoming a peer in 1830.

Brougham won popular renown for helping defeat the 1820 Pains and Penalties Bill, an attempt by the widely disliked George IV to annul his marriage to Caroline of Brunswick. He became an advocate of liberal causes including abolition of the slave trade, free trade and parliamentary reform. Appointed Lord Chancellor in 1830, he made a number of reforms intended to speed up legal cases and established the Central Criminal Court. He never regained government office after 1834 and although he played an active role in the House of Lords, he often did so in opposition to his former colleagues.

Education was another area of interest. He helped establish the Society for the Diffusion of Useful Knowledge.

He also was a founder of University College London, as well as holding some academic posts, including Rector, University of Edinburgh. In later years he spent much of his time in the French town of Cannes, making it a popular resort for the British upper-classes; he died there in 1868.

== Life ==
=== Early life ===
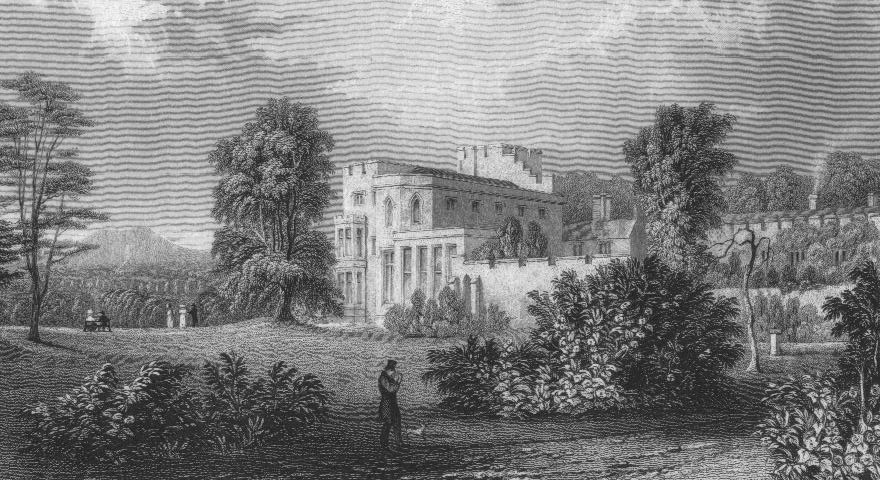
Brougham Hall in 1832

Brougham was born and grew up in Edinburgh, the eldest son of Henry Brougham (1742–1810), of Brougham Hall in Westmorland, and Eleanora, daughter of Reverend James Syme. The Broughams had been an influential Cumberland family for centuries. Brougham was educated at the Royal High School and the University of Edinburgh, where he chiefly studied natural science and mathematics, but also the law. He published several scientific papers through the Royal Society, notably on light and colours and on prisms, and at the age of only 25 was elected a Fellow.

However, Brougham chose law as his profession and was admitted to the Faculty of Advocates in 1800. He practised little in Scotland, and instead entered Lincoln's Inn in 1803. Five years later he was called to the Bar. Not a wealthy man, Brougham turned to journalism to support himself financially through these years. He was one of the founders of the Edinburgh Review and quickly became known as its foremost contributor, with articles on everything from science, politics, colonial policy, literature, poetry, surgery, mathematics and the fine arts.

In the early 19th century, Brougham, a follower of Newton, launched anonymous attacks in the Edinburgh Review against Thomas Young's research, which proved light was a wave phenomenon that exhibited interference and diffraction. These attacks slowed acceptance of the truth for a decade, until François Arago and Augustin-Jean Fresnel championed Young's work.

Brougham's scientific forays also included an attack upon Sir William Herschel (1738–1822). As Royal Astronomer, Herschel found a correlation between the observed number of sunspots and wheat prices. This met with ridicule as a "grand absurdity" from Lord Brougham. Economists nowadays concur with Brougham on the irrelevancy of sunspots.

=== Early career ===
The success of the Edinburgh Review made Brougham a man of the mark from his first arrival in London. He quickly became a fixture in London society and gained the friendship of Lord Grey and other leading Whig politicians. In 1806 the Foreign Secretary, Charles James Fox, appointed him secretary to a diplomatic mission to Portugal, led by James St Clair-Erskine, 2nd Earl of Rosslyn, and John Jervis, 1st Earl of St Vincent. The mission aimed to counteract the anticipated French invasion of Portugal.

During these years he became a close supporter of the movement for the abolition of slavery, a cause to which he was to be passionately devoted for the rest of his life. Despite being a well-known and popular figure, Brougham had to wait before being offered a parliamentary seat to contest. However, in 1810 he was elected for Camelford, a rotten borough controlled by the Duke of Bedford.

He quickly gained a reputation in the House of Commons, where he was one of the most frequent speakers and was regarded by some as a potential future leader of the Whig Party. However, Brougham's career was to take a downturn in 1812, when, standing as one of two Whig candidates for Liverpool, he was heavily defeated. He was to remain out of Parliament until 1816 when he was returned for Winchelsea. He quickly resumed his position as one of the most forceful members of the House of Commons and worked especially in advocating a programme for the education of the poor, where he chaired the select committee which produced the influential Reports on the Education of the Lower Orders.

He was also a proponent of legal reform and it was on this subject in 1828, he made a six-hour speech, the longest ever made in the House of Commons.

=== Defence of Queen Caroline ===
In 1812, Brougham had become one of the chief advisers to Queen Caroline of Brunswick, the estranged wife of George, Prince of Wales, the Prince Regent and future George IV. This was to prove a key development in his life.

In April 1820, Caroline, then living abroad, appointed Brougham her Attorney-General. Earlier that year George IV had succeeded to the throne on the death of his long incapacitated father George III. Caroline was brought back to Britain in June for appearances only, but the king immediately began divorce proceedings against her.

The Pains and Penalties Bill, aimed at dissolving the marriage and stripping Caroline of her Royal title on the grounds of adultery, was brought before the House of Lords by the Tory government. However, Brougham led a legal team (which also included Thomas Denman) that eloquently defended the Princess. Brougham threatened to introduce evidence of George IV's affairs and his secret marriage to a Roman Catholic, which could have potentially thrown the monarchy into chaos, and it was suggested to Brougham that he hold back for the sake of his country.

He responded with his now-famous speech in the House of Lords:

An advocate, in the discharge of his duty, knows but one person in all the world, and that person is his client. To save that client by all means and expedients, and at all hazards and costs to other persons, and amongst them, to himself, is his first and only duty; and in performing this duty he must not regard the alarm, the torments, the destruction which he may bring upon others. Separating the duty of a patriot from that of an advocate, he must go on reckless of consequences, though it should be his unhappy fate to involve his country in confusion.

The speech has since become legendary among defence lawyers for the principle of zealously advocating for one's client.

The bill passed, but by the narrow margin of only nine votes. Lord Liverpool, aware of the unpopularity of the bill and afraid that it might be overturned in the House of Commons, then withdrew it. The British public had mainly been on the Princess's side, and the outcome of the trial made Brougham one of the most famous men in the country. His legal practice on the Northern Circuit rose fivefold, although he had to wait until 1827 before being made a King's Counsel.

In 1826, Brougham, along with Wellington, was one of the clients and lovers named in the notorious Memoirs of Harriette Wilson. Before publication, Wilson and publisher John Joseph Stockdale wrote to all those named in the book offering them the opportunity to be excluded from the work in exchange for a cash payment. Brougham paid and secured his anonymity.

=== Lord Chancellor ===
NO SLAVERY!

ELECTORS OF THE COUNTY OF YORK

You honourably distinguished yourselves

In the ABOLITION OF THE SLAVE TRADE

by your zealous support of

WILLIAM WILBERFORCE

Who can be more worthy of your choice as a

REPRESENTATIVE FOR THE COUNTY

the enlightened friend and champion of Negro Freedom

HENRY BROUGHAM

by returning him

YOU WILL DO AN HONOUR TO THE COUNTY

and

A SERVICE TO HUMANITY

Brougham remained a member of Parliament for Winchelsea until February 1830 when he was returned for Knaresborough. However, he represented Knaresborough only until August the same year, when he became one of four representatives for Yorkshire. His support for the immediate abolition of slavery brought him enthusiastic support in the industrial West Riding. The Reverend Benjamin Godwin of Bradford devised and funded posters that appealed to Yorkshire voters who had supported William Wilberforce to support Brougham as a committed opponent of slavery However, Brougham was adopted as a Whig candidate by only a tiny majority at the nomination meeting: the Whig gentry objecting that he had no connection with agricultural interests, and no connection with the county. Brougham came second in the poll, behind the other Whig candidate; although the liberals of Leeds had placarded the town with claims that one of the Tory candidates supported slavery, this was strenuously denied by him.

In November the Tory government led by the Duke of Wellington fell, and the Whigs came to power under Lord Grey. Brougham joined the government as Lord Chancellor, although his opponents claimed he previously stated he would not accept office under Grey. Brougham refused the post of Attorney General, but accepted that of Lord Chancellor, which he held for four years. On 22 November, he was raised to the peerage as Baron Brougham and Vaux, of Brougham in the County of Westmorland.

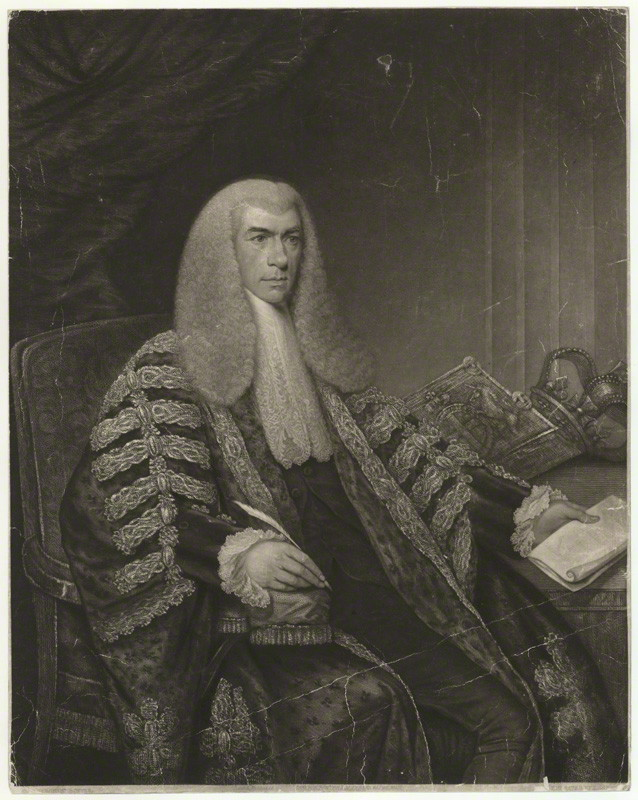
Brougham as Lord Chancellor (1830–1834)

The highlights of Brougham's time in government were passing the Reform Act 1832 and Slavery Abolition Act 1833 but he was seen as dangerous, unreliable and arrogant. Charles Greville, who was Clerk of the Privy Council for 35 years, recorded his "genius and eloquence" was marred by "unprincipled and execrable judgement". Although retained when Lord Melbourne succeeded Grey in July 1834, the administration was replaced in November by Sir Robert Peel's Tories. When Melbourne became Prime Minister again in April 1835, he excluded Brougham, saying his conduct was one of the main reasons for the fall of the previous government; Baron Cottenham became Lord Chancellor in January 1836.

=== Later life ===
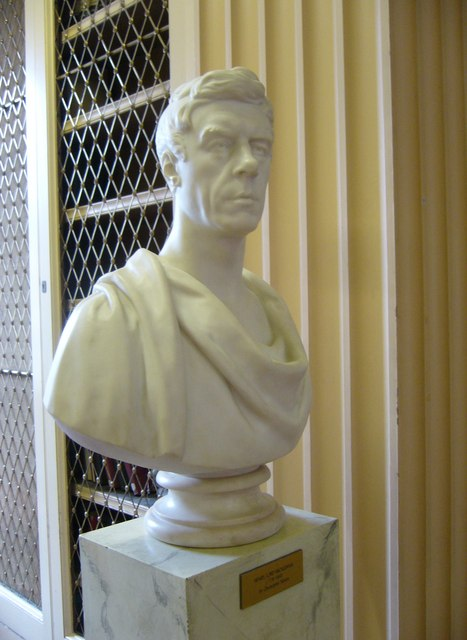
Bust of Henry Brougham in the Playfair Library of Edinburgh University's Old College

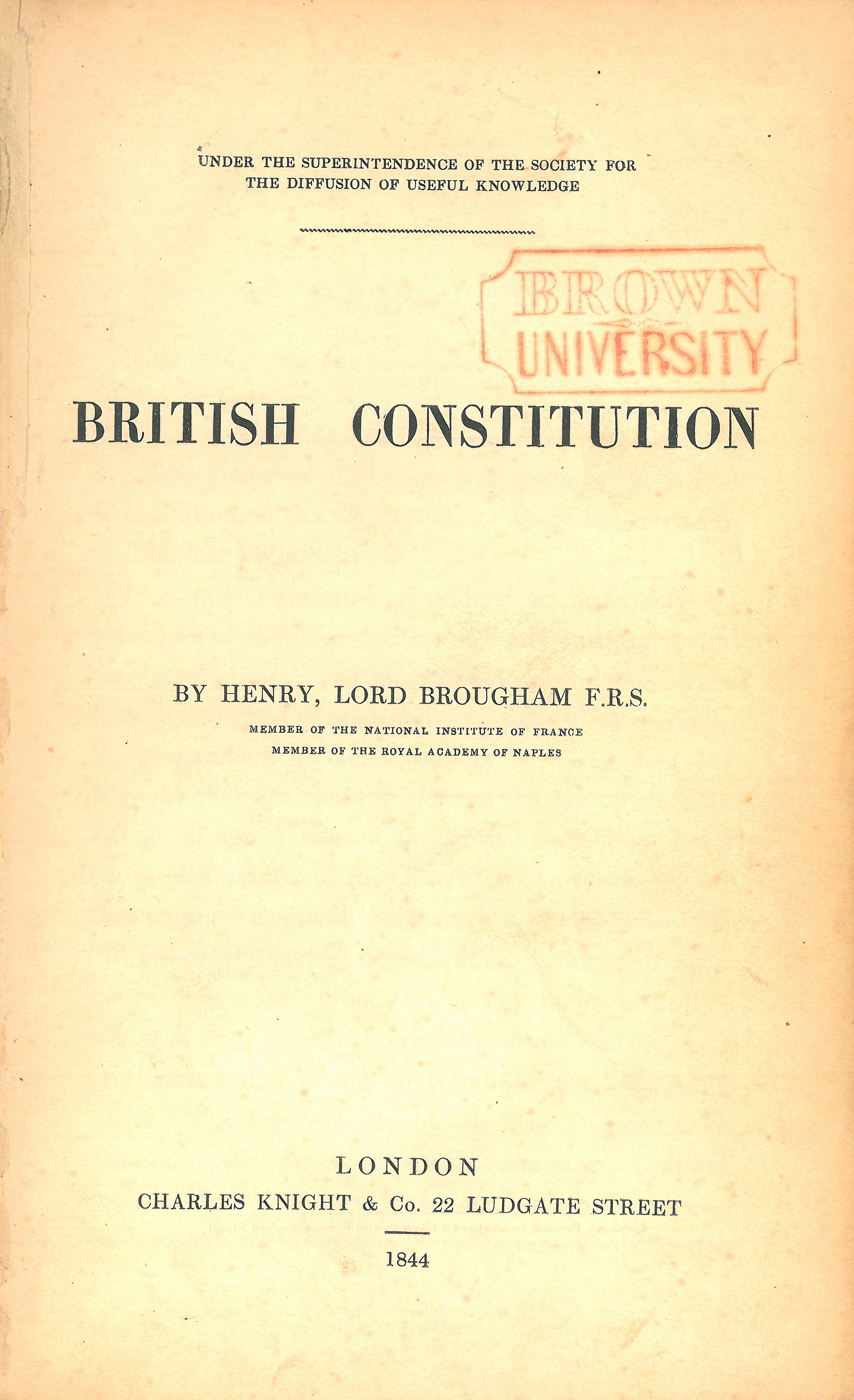
The title page of British Constitution (1st ed., 1844), written by Brougham

Brougham was never to hold office again. However, for more than thirty years after his fall he continued to take an active part in the judicial business of the House of Lords, and in its debates, having now turned fiercely against his former political associates, but continuing his efforts on behalf of reform of various kinds. He also devoted much of his time to writing. He had continued to contribute to the Edinburgh Review, the best of his writings being subsequently published as Historical Sketches of Statesmen Who Flourished in the Time of George III.

In 1834, he was elected a foreign member of the Royal Swedish Academy of Sciences. In 1837, Brougham presented a bill for public education, arguing that "it cannot be doubted that some legislative effort must at length be made to remove from this country the opprobrium of having done less for the education of the people than any of the more civilized nations on earth".

In 1838, after news came up of British colonies where the emancipation of the slaves was obstructed or where the ex-slaves were being badly treated and discriminated against, Lord Brougham stated in the House of Lords:

The slave ... is as fit for his freedom as any English peasant, aye, or any Lord whom I now address. I demand his rights; I demand his liberty without stint.... I demand that your brother be no longer trampled upon as your slave!

Brougham was elected Rector of Marischal College for 1838. He also edited, in collaboration with Sir Charles Bell, William Paley's Natural Theology and published a work on political philosophy and in 1838 he published an edition of his speeches in four volumes. The last of his works was his posthumous Autobiography.

In 1854, Brougham was appointed to the Royal Commission for Consolidating the Statute Law, a royal commission to consolidate existing statutes and enactments of English law.

In 1857 he was one of the founders of the National Association for the Promotion of Social Science and was its president at some congresses.

In 1860, Brougham was given by Queen Victoria a second peerage as Baron Brougham and Vaux, of Brougham in the County of Westmorland and of Highhead Castle in the County of Cumberland, with remainder to his youngest brother William Brougham (died 1886). The patent stated that the second peerage was in honour of the great services he had rendered, especially in promoting the abolition of slavery.

== Family ==
Brougham was said to be the father of writer Marie Blaze de Bury. Her last name was Stuart or Stewart and she was born in Oban, Scotland in 1813. She was sent to France when she was nine where she completed her education.

Brougham married in 1821 Mary Anne Spalding (1785 - 1865), daughter of Thomas Eden, widow of John Spalding, MP, and mother of Marianne Spalding, wife of Sir Alexander Malet, 2nd Baronet, Envoy Extraordinary and Minister Plenipotentiary to German Confederation. They had two daughters, both of whom predeceased their parents, the latter one dying in 1839.

Lord Brougham and Vaux died in May 1868 in Cannes, France, aged 89 and was buried in the Cimetière du Grand Jas. The cemetery is up to the present dominated by Brougham's statue, and he is honoured for his major role in building the city of Cannes. His hatchment is in Ninekirks, which was then the parish church of Brougham.

The Barony of 1830 became extinct on his death, while he was succeeded in the Barony of 1860 according to the special remainder by his younger brother William Brougham.

== Legacy ==
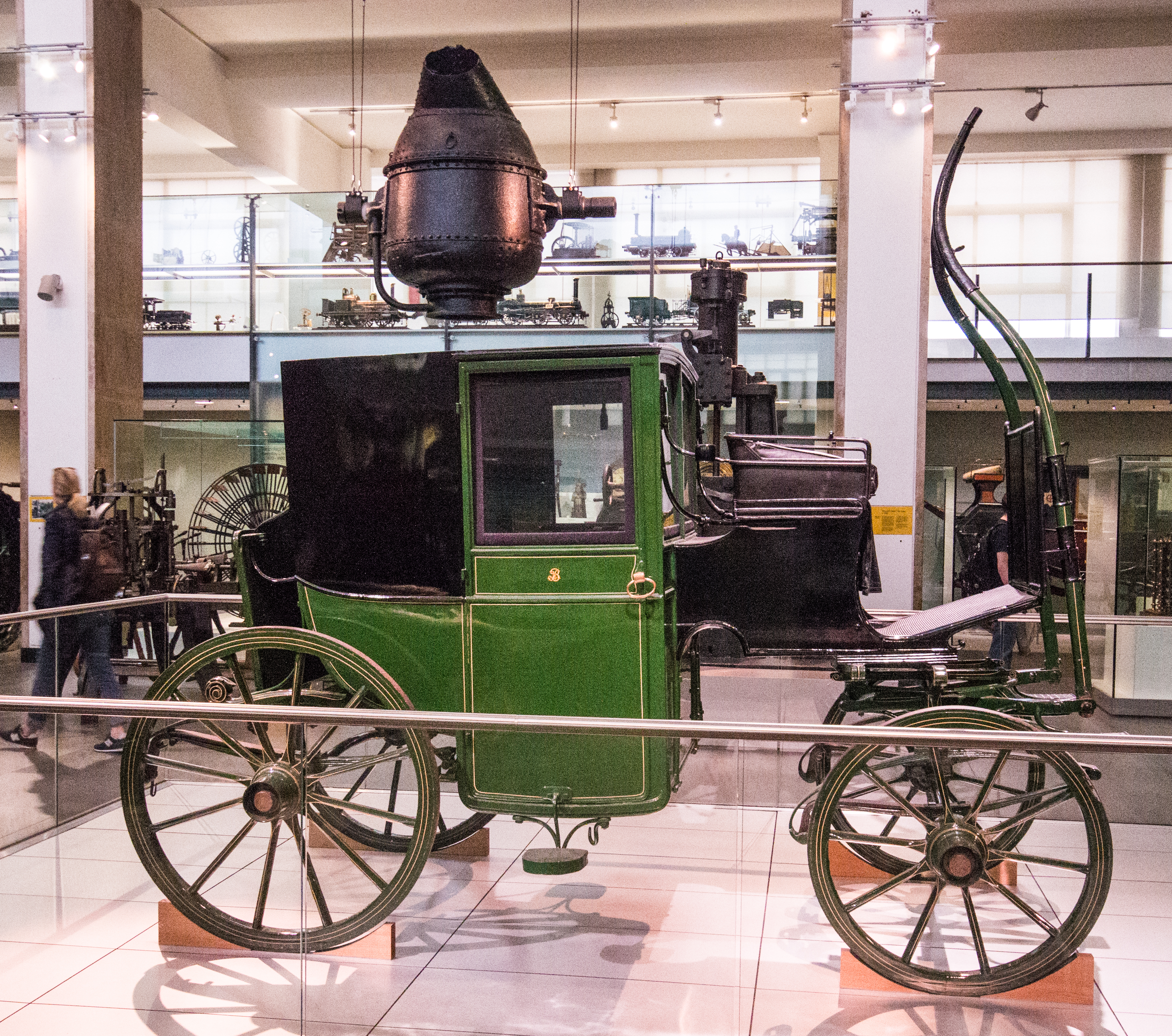
Lord Brougham's original 1838 carriage prototype on display at the London Science Museum.

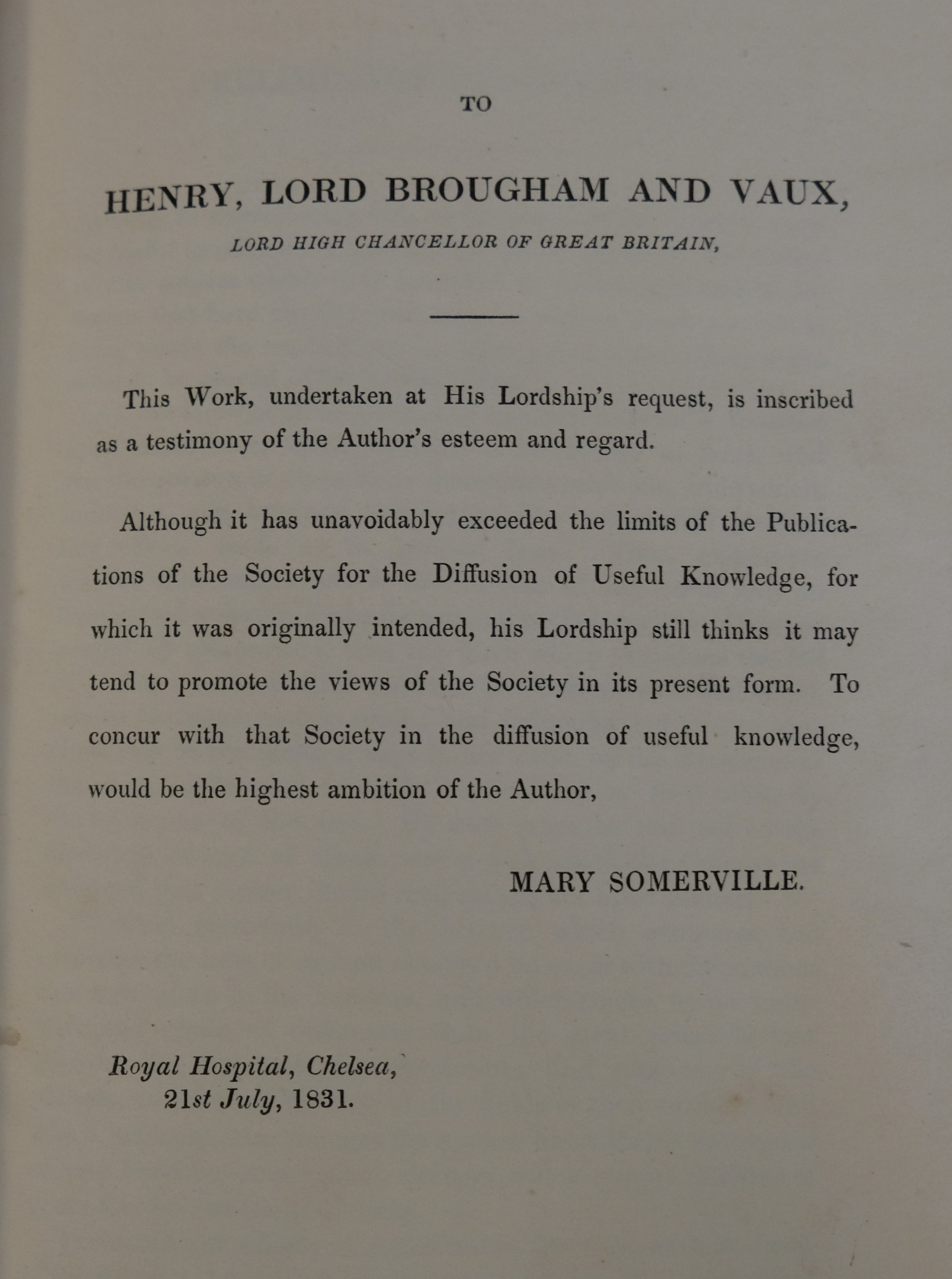
Dedication to Brougham in Mechanism of the Heavens (1831) by Mary Somerville

As the designer of the brougham, a four-wheeled horse-drawn carriage that bears his name, Brougham's patronage brought renown to the French seaside resort of Cannes. In 1835, when little more than a fishing village on a picturesque coast, Brougham purchased a tract of land and built on it, leading it to become a popular sanitorium of Europe. Owing to his influence the beachfront promenade at Nice became known as the Promenade des Anglais (literally, "The Promenade of the English"). The baron inspired others to winter in Cannes and own a second home there. He oversaw the construction of 'Villa Elenore-Louise' which he named after his daughter, living in the villa himself. One of his friends became the riviera's de facto estate agent owing to the building of Château Vallombrosa. The newly built villas made popular by Brougham attracted royalty, including as Queen Victoria and the Russian Czar.

A statue of Lord Brougham stands at the Cannes waterfront, across from the Palais des festivals et des congrès.

Brougham holds the House of Commons record for non-stop speaking at six hours.

According to legend, a very young Brougham was present, along with Robert Burns, at the trial of the world's first steam-powered ship on 14 October 1788 at Dalswinton Loch near Auldgirth, Dumfries and Galloway. Brougham denied this, and it's likely Burns's presence is also invented. William Symington of Wanlockhead built the two-cylindered engine for Patrick Miller of Dalswinton.

Brougham Street and Brougham Place in Edinburgh are named in his memory.

Brougham Street in Christchurch, New Zealand, was also named in his honour.

== Works ==
Brougham wrote a prodigious number of treatises on science, philosophy, and history. Besides the writings mentioned in this article, he was the author of Dialogues on Instinct; with Analytical View of the Researches on Fossil Osteology, Lives of Statesmen, Philosophers, and Men of Science of the Time of George III, Natural Theology, etc. His last work was an autobiography written in his 84th year and published in 1871.

Brougham's Political Philosophy was included on the Cambridge syllabus for History and Political Philosophy, where it was considered among the major works on the topic along with Aristotle's Politics, François Guizot's Histoire de la civilization en Europe, and Henry Hallam's Constitutional History.

- Henry Brougham Brougham and Vaux (1838). Speeches of Henry Lord Brougham, Upon Questions Relating to Public Rights, Duties, and Interests: With Historical Introductions, and a Critical Dissertation Upon the Eloquence of the Ancients, Edinburgh: Adam and Charles Black, 4 vol. (online: vol. 1, 2, 3, 4)
- Brougham, Henry (1845). Historical sketches of statesmen who flourished in the time of George III. 2. Vol. 1. Ludgate street, London: Charles Knight & co. ISBN 978-1270960287. "Henry Brougham, 1st Baron Brougham and Vaux"
- Brougham, Henry (1872). The works of Henry Brougham. Vol. 10. Edinburgh: Adam and Charles Black. "Henry Brougham, 1st Baron Brougham and Vaux"

== Collections ==
The papers of the Brougham family were deposited at University College London in 1953, having previously been purchased by C.K. Ogden. The majority of the collection is formed by Henry Brougham's extensive correspondence, totalling over 50,000 items. The University also holds the archive of the Society for the Diffusion of Useful Knowledge, which Brougham helped to establish.

== Arms ==
Coat of arms of Henry Brougham, 1st Baron Brougham and Vaux
Crest A dexter arm in armour embowed Proper the hand holding a lucy fessewise Argent and charged on the elbow with a rose Gules. Escutcheon Gules a chevron between three lucies hauriant Argent. Supporters Dexter a lion Vert armed and langued Gules gorged with a Vaux collar checky Or and of the second, sinister a stag Argent attired and unguled Or holding in the mouth a rose Gules barbed and seeded Vert. Motto Pro Rege Lege Grege (For The King The Law And The People)

== See also ==
- March of Intellect

== Attribution ==
Parliament of the United Kingdom
Preceded by Lord Henry Petty; Robert Adair	Member of Parliament for Camelford; 1810–1812; With: Robert Adair	Succeeded by William Leader; Samuel Scott
Preceded by William Powlett; Calverley Bewicke	Member of Parliament for Winchelsea; 1815–1830; With: Calverley Bewicke, until 1816; Viscount Barnard, 1816–1818; George Galway Mills, 1818–1820; Lucius Concannon, 1820–1823; William Leader, 1823–1826; Viscount Howick, from 1826	Succeeded by John Williams; Viscount Howick
Preceded by Sir James Mackintosh; George Tierney	Member of Parliament for Knaresborough; 1830; With: Sir James Mackintosh	Succeeded by The Lord Waterpark; Sir James Mackintosh
Preceded by John Marshall; Richard Wilson; William Duncombe; Viscount Milton; William Duncombe	Member of Parliament for Yorkshire; 1830; With: William Duncombe; Viscount Morpeth; Richard Bethell	Succeeded by Sir John Vanden-Bempde-Johnstone, Bt; William Duncombe; Viscount Morpeth; Richard Bethell
Political offices
Preceded by Lord Lyndhurst	Lord High Chancellor of Great Britain; 1830–1834	Succeeded by Lord Lyndhurst
Academic offices
Preceded by James Mackintosh	Rector of the University of Glasgow; 1824–1826	Succeeded by Thomas Campbell
New office	Chancellor of the University of Edinburgh; 1859–1868	Succeeded by Lord Glencorse
Peerage of the United Kingdom
New creation	Baron Brougham and Vaux of Brougham; 1830–1868	Extinct
New creation	Baron Brougham and Vaux of Brougham and High Head Castle; 1860–1868	Succeeded by William Brougham
