= Gerald French =

English cricketer (1883–1970)

Personal information
- Full name: Edward Gerald Fleming French
- Born: 11 December 1883; Woburn Sands, Buckinghamshire, England
- Died: 17 September 1970 (aged 86); Hove, Sussex, England
- Batting: Left-handed
- Bowling: Unknown

Domestic team information
- Years: Team
- 1924–1927: Devon
- 1922–1936: Marylebone Cricket Club

Career statistics
Competition	First-class
Matches	2
Runs scored	10
Batting average	5.00
100s/50s	0/0
Top score	5
Balls bowled	114
Wickets	0
Bowling average	–
5 wickets in innings	–
10 wickets in match	–
Best bowling	–
Catches/stumpings	0/–
- Source: Cricinfo, 16 February 2011

Edward Gerald Fleming French DSO (11 December 1883 – 17 September 1970) was an English cricketer and soldier. French was a left-handed batsman, although his bowling style is unknown. He was born in Woburn Sands, Buckinghamshire.

He was the son of John French, 1st Earl of Ypres. Educated at Sandroyd School then Wellington College where he represented the college cricket team, French served in the First World War. He was wounded and gassed in 1917, and was mentioned in dispatches twice. He gained the rank of major in the Yorkshire Regiment. He was awarded the Distinguished Service Order in 1918.

French made his first-class debut for the Marylebone Cricket Club against Scotland in 1922. In 1924, he made his Minor Counties Championship debut for Devon against the Surrey Second XI. From 1924 to 1927, he represented the county in 20 Championship matches, the last of which came against the Kent Second XI. Nine years later, he made his second and final first-class appearance for the Marylebone Cricket Club against Ireland at Observatory Lane, Dublin.

Later, French captained and managed many non-first-class Marylebone Cricket Club teams. He wrote two books on cricket, The Corner Stone of English Cricket and It's Not Cricket, and other books including John Jorrocks and Other Characters from the Works of Robert Surtees and The Martyrdom of Admiral Byng.

He was Deputy Governor of Dartmoor Prison and Governor of Newcastle Prison. He married Leila King (d. 1959), daughter of Robert King, of Natal, South Africa. The French sisters, Essex Leila Hilary French and Violet Valerie French were his daughters.

He died in Hove, Sussex, on 17 September 1970.
