= Portrait of Henry Brougham =

1825 painting by Thomas Lawrence

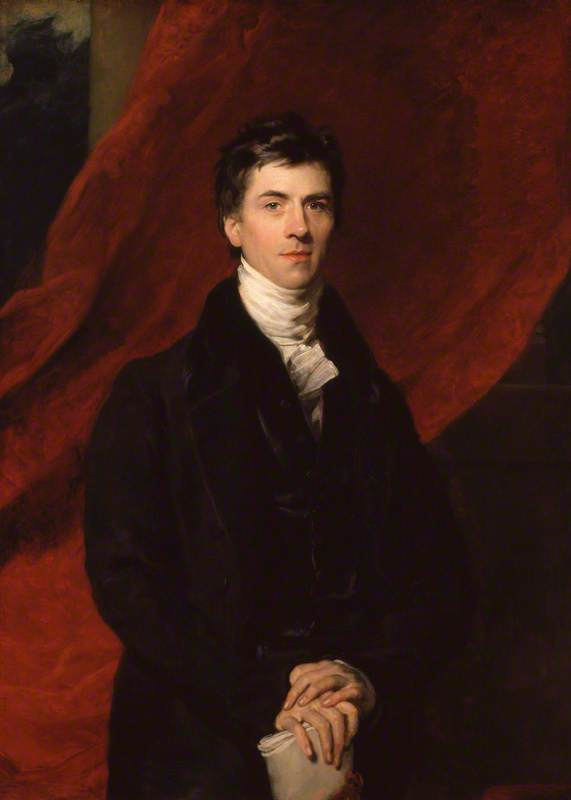
- Artist: Thomas Lawrence
- Year: 1825
- Type: Oil on canvas, portrait
- Dimensions: 290 cm × 208 cm (114.3 in × 81.9 in)
- Location: National Portrait Gallery, London

Portrait of Henry Brougham is an oil on canvas portrait painting by the English artist Sir Thomas Lawrence depicting the British politician and lawyer Henry Brougham. It was created in 1825.

== History and description ==
A prominent member of the Whig opposition, Brougham made his name for his defence of Caroline of Brunswick in 1820 when her husband George IV attempted to divorce her in the House of Lords. He was later made Baron Brougham in 1830 and appointed as Lord Chancellor in the first Whig government to hold office for twenty three years.

Lawrence was Britain's leading portraitist and President of the Royal Academy when he depicted Brougham. He painted many leading figures of the Regency era. Some critics suggested he had overly flattered the politician. On the other hand, Brougham himself was reportedly dissatisfied with the portrait which was why he was evasive about poising for Benjamin Robert Haydon's The Reform Banquet in the early 1830s.

The painting is now in the collection of the National Portrait Gallery in London having been acquired in 1943.

== Bibliography ==
- Atlay, James Beresford. The Victorian Chancellors. Smith, Elder, 1906.
- Byrde, Penelope. Nineteenth Century Fashion. Batsford, 1992.
- Levey, Michael. Sir Thomas Lawrence. Yale University Press, 2005.
- O'Keeffe, Paul. A Genius for Failure: The life of Benjamin Robert Haydon. Random House, 2011.
