= Southwaite =

Village in Cumbria, England

Coordinates: 54.798°N 2.857°W

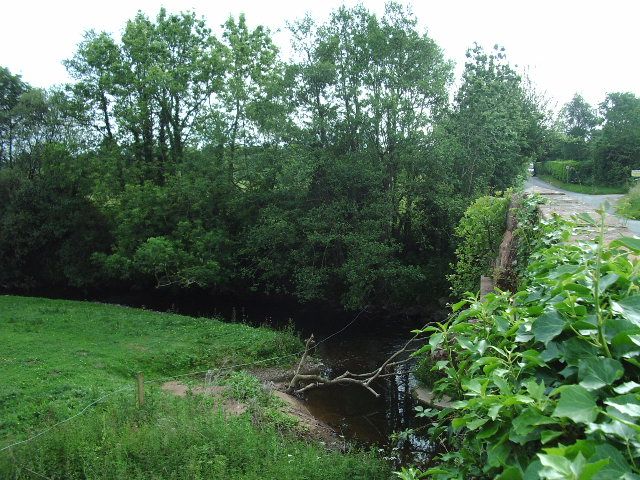
- River Petteril at Southwaite

- Location in Eden, Cumbria Location within Cumbria
- OS grid reference: NY449451
- Civil parish: Hesket
- Unitary authority: Westmorland and Furness
- Ceremonial county: Cumbria
- Region: North West
- Country: England
- Sovereign state: United Kingdom
- Post town: CARLISLE
- Postcode district: CA4
- Dialling code: 016974
- Police: Cumbria
- Fire: Cumbria
- Ambulance: North West
- UK Parliament: Penrith and Solway

Southwaite is a small village in the parish of Hesket, in the unitary authority of Westmorland and Furness, in the English county of Cumbria, but previously in the historic county of Cumberland.

== Location ==
It is located on a minor road about one and a half miles (2.4 km) away from the A6 road and about one mile (1.6 km) away from the M6 motorway which can be accessed from Southwaite services, which has been named after the village. It has the west coast main line going through the middle of it and the River Petteril nearby. Southwaite railway station closed in 1952. Historically it was within Inglewood Forest.

== Nearby settlements ==
Nearby settlements include the villages of Ivegill, Low Hesket, High Hesket and the hamlet of Mellguards.

== See also ==
- Listed buildings in Hesket, Cumbria
