= List of churches in Eden District =

The following is a list of churches in the former Eden District in Cumbria. This area is now part of the Westmorland and Furness unitary authority area.

The following parishes have no active churches: Colby, Crackenthorpe, Hartley, Helbeck, Hoff, Hunsonby, Kaber, Newby, Shap Rural, Sockbridge and Tirril, Thrimby, Waitby, Wharton and Yanwath and Eamont Bridge.

The former district has an estimated 121 active churches for 53,000 people, a ratio of one church to every 438 inhabitants. This is the lowest ratio in England outside of the sui generis City of London.

== Map of medieval parish churches ==
For the purposes of this map medieval is taken to be pre-1485. It is of note that Cumbria, unlike most parts of England, saw a sustained programme of church building during the 16th and 17th centuries as the more remote parts of the district were settled.

Medieval parish churches in Eden District

== List ==
| Name | Civil parish (settlement) | Dedication | Web | Founded | Denomination | Benefice | Notes |
|---|---|---|---|---|---|---|---|
| St Michael & All Angels, Ainstable | Ainstable | Michael & Angels | | Medieval | Church of England | Inglewood Group | Rebuilt 1872 |
| Ainstable Methodist Church | Ainstable | | | 1861 | Methodist | Kirkoswald & Alston Moor MC | |
| St Augustine of Canterbury, Alston | Alston Moor (Alston) | Augustine of C'bury | | Medieval | Church of England | Alston Moor Parish | Rebuilt 1869. Benefice includes 3 churches in Northumberland |
| Alston Moor Methodist Church | Alston Moor (Alston) | | | | Methodist | Kirkoswald & Alston Moor MC | Meet in St Wulstan's Catholic church |
| St Wulstan, Alston | Alston Moor (Alston) | Wulfstan | | | Catholic | | Part of the parish of St Catherine's, Penrith |
| Alston Friends Meeting House | Alston Moor (Alston) | | | 1668 | Quakers | Cumberland Area Quakers | Discontinued 1902-1981 |
| St John the Evangelist, Garrigill | Alston Moor (Garrigill) | John the Evangelist | | Medieval | Church of England | Alston Moor Parish | Chapel of ease to Alston until 1980s |
| St John the Evangelist, Nenthead | Alston Moor (Nenthead) | John the Evangelist | | 1845 | Church of England | Alston Moor Parish | |
| St Lawrence, Appleby | Appleby in Westmorland | Lawrence of Rome | | Medieval | Church of England | Heart of Eden | |
| Our Lady of Appleby, Appleby | Appleby in Westmorland | Mary | | | Catholic | | Also holds Sunday masses in Kirkby Stephen parish church |
| The Sands Methodist Church, Appleby | Appleby in Westmorland | | | | Methodist | Kirkby Stephen, Appleby, Tebay MC | |
| St Peter, Asby | Asby | Peter | | Medieval | Church of England | Heart of Eden | |
| Great Asby Methodist Church | Asby | | | 1859 | Methodist | Kirkby Stephen, Appleby, Tebay MC | |
| Asby Bridge Baptist Church | Asby | | | 1862 | Baptist | | |
| St Peter, Askham | Askham | Peter | | Medieval | Church of England | Clifton Group | Current building 1832 |
| St Patrick, Bampton | Bampton | Patrick | | Medieval | Church of England | Shap Group | Rebuilt 1726 |
| St Michael, Barton | Barton | Michael | | Medieval | Church of England | Ullswater Churches | |
| St Paul, Pooley Bridge | Barton (Pooley Bridge) | Paul | | 1868 | Church of England | Ullswater Churches | |
| All Saints, Bolton | Bolton | All Saints | | Medieval | Church of England | Leith Lyvennet Group | |
| Bolton Methodist Church | Bolton | | | | Methodist | Kirkby Stephen, Appleby, Tebay MC | |
| St Michael, Brough | Brough | Michael | | Medieval | Church of England | Brough Group | |
| Brough Methodist Church | Brough | | | | Methodist | Kirkby Stephen, Appleby, Tebay MC | |
| Brough Sowerby Methodist Church | Brough Sowerby | | | | Methodist | Kirkby Stephen, Appleby, Tebay MC | |
| St Wilfrid, Brougham | Brougham | Wilfrid | | Medieval | Church of England | Clifton Group | Chapel. Current building 1658 |
| St Kentigern, Castle Sowerby | Castle Sowerby | Mungo | | Medieval | Church of England | Caldbeck, C. Sowerby, Sebergham | Benefice also includes two churches in Allerdale |
| Castle Sowerby Chapel | Castle Sowerby (Sour Nook) | | | | Unknown | | |
| St John, Newton Reigny | Catterlen (Newton Reigny) | John ? | | Medieval | Church of England | Penrith Team | |
| St Cuthbert, Cliburn | Cliburn | Cuthbert | | Medieval | Church of England | Leith Lyvennet Group | |
| St Cuthbert, Clifton | Clifton | Cuthbert | | Medieval | Church of England | Clifton Group | |
| St Andrew, Crosby Garrett | Crosby Garrett | Andrew | | Medieval | Church of England | Kirkby Stephen Group | |
| Crosby Garrett United Church | Crosby Garrett | | | | Methodist/Baptist | Kirkby Stephen, Appleby, Tebay MC | Methodist and Baptist churches united |
| St Lawrence, Crosby Ravensworth | Crosby Ravensworth | Lawrence of Rome | | Medieval | Church of England | Leith Lyvennet Group | |
| Crosby Ravensworth Methodist Church | Crosby Ravensworth | | | 1875 | Methodist | Kirkby Stephen, Appleby, Tebay MC | |
| All Saints, Culgaith | Culgaith | All Saints | | 1756 | Church of England | Cross Fell Group | |
| St John the Evangelist, Skirwith | Culgaith (Skirwith) | John the Evangelist | | 1856 | Church of England | Cross Fell Group | |
| St Lawrence, Kirkland | Culgaith | Lawrence of Rome | | Medieval | Church of England | Cross Fell Group | |
| St Andrew, Dacre | Dacre | Andrew | | Medieval | Church of England | Dacre | |
| Stainton Methodist Church | Dacre (Stainton) | | | | Methodist | Penrith Methodist Circuit | |
| St Cuthbert, Dufton | Dufton | Cuthbert | | Medieval | Church of England | Heart of Eden | Rebuilt 1784 |
| Dufton with Knock Methodist Church | Dufton | | | 1803 | Methodist | Kirkby Stephen, Appleby, Tebay MC | Current building 1900 |
| St Michael, Addingham | Glassonby (Addingham) | Michael | | C16th | Church of England | Cross Fell Group | |
| Gamblesby Methodist Church | Glassonby (Gamblesby) | | | 1784 | Methodist | Kirkoswald & Alston Moor MC | Rebuilt 1864. |
| St Cuthbert, Great Salkeld | Great Salkeld | Cuthbert | | Medieval | Church of England | Kirkoswald Group | |
| Salkeld Dykes Methodist Church | Great Salkeld | | | 1832 | Methodist | Kirkoswald & Alston Moor MC | |
| St Barnabas, Great Strickland | Great Strickland | Barnabas | | 1870 | Church of England | Leith Lyvennet Group | |
| St Andrew, Greystoke | Greystoke | Andrew | | Medieval | Church of England | Greystoke Group | |
| St Mary the Virgin, Hesket in the Forest | Hesket (High Hesket) | Mary | | Medieval | Church of England | Inglewood Group | |
| Christ & St Mary, Armathwaite | Hesket (Armathwaite) | Jesus & Mary | | 1402 | Church of England | Inglewood Group | Rebuilt 1660 |
| All Saints, Calthwaite | Hesket (Calthwaite) | All Saints | | 1913 | Church of England | Inglewood Group | |
| St John the Evangelist, Plumpton Wall | Hesket (Plumpton) | John the Evangelist | | 1907 | Church of England | Penrith Team | |
| Cottage Wood Centre | Hesket (Plumpton) | | | | Methodist | Penrith Methodist Circuit | Formerly Plumpton Backstreet Chapel |
| All Saints, Penruddock | Hutton (Penruddock) | All Saints | | 1901 | Church of England | Greystoke Group | |
| King's Meaburn Methodist Church | King's Meaburn | | | | Methodist | Kirkby Stephen, Appleby, Tebay MC | |
| St Stephen, Kirkby Stephen | Kirkby Stephen | Stephen | | Ancient | Church of England | Kirkby Stephen Group | Current building 1240 |
| Upper Eden Bap. Ch., Kirkby Stephen | Kirkby Stephen | | | 1891 | Baptist | | |
| Kirkby Stephen Methodist Church | Kirkby Stephen | | | | Methodist | Kirkby Stephen, Appleby, Tebay MC | |
| Kirkby Stephen Evangelical Church | Kirkby Stephen | | | 1870s | Gospel Hall | | |
| Kirkby Stephen Quaker Meeting | Kirkby Stephen | | | | Quakers | | Current building 1930 |
| St Michael, Kirkby Thore | Kirkby Thore | Michael | | Medieval | Church of England | Heart of Eden | |
| St Oswald, Kirkoswald | Kirkoswald | Oswald of N'umbria | | Medieval | Church of England | Kirkoswald Group | |
| Kirkoswald Methodist Church | Kirkoswald | | | | Methodist | Kirkoswald & Alston Moor MC | |
| All Saints, Renwick | Kirkoswald (Renwick) | All Saints | | Medieval | Church of England | Kirkoswald Group | Rebuilt 1845 |
| Renwick Methodist Church | Kirkoswald (Renwick) | | | 1819 | Methodist | Kirkoswald & Alston Moor MC | Rebuilt 1905 |
| St Peter, Langwathby | Langwathby | Peter | | Medieval | Church of England | Cross Fell Group | |
| Langwathby Methodist Church | Langwathby | | | | Methodist | Kirkoswald & Alston Moor MC | |
| St Cuthbert, Edenhall | Langwathby (Edenhall) | Cuthbert | | Medieval | Church of England | Cross Fell Group | |
| St Nicholas, Lazonby | Lazonby | Nicholas | | Medieval | Church of England | Kirkoswald Group | Rebuilt 1863 by Anthony Salvin |
| Lazonby Methodist Church | Lazonby | | | | Methodist | | Possibly closed, no current information |
| St Mary, Thrimby | Little Strickland | Mary | | Medieval | Church of England | Leith Lyvennet Group | Moved to new building in current location 1813 |
| SS Margaret & James, Long Marton | Long Marton | Margaret & James | | Ancient | Church of England | Heart of Eden | |
| St Michael, Lowther | Lowther | Michael | | Ancient | Church of England | Clifton Group | |
| St Mary, Mallerstang | Mallerstang | Mary | | Medieval | Church of England | Kirkby Stephen Group | Current building 1663 |
| St Peter, Martindale | Martindale | Peter | | 1880 | Church of England | Ullswater Churches | |
| St Martin, Martindale | Martindale | Martin of Tours | | Medieval | Church of England | Ullswater Churches | Parish church 1633 |
| Matterdale Church | Matterdale | | | 1570 | Church of England | Greystoke Group | |
| All Saints, Watermillock | Matterdale (Watermillock) | All Saints | | Medieval | Church of England | Ullswater Churches | Rebuilt on current site 1881 |
| St Cuthbert, Milburn | Milburn | Cuthbert | | Medieval | Church of England | Heart of Eden | |
| St Laurence, Morland | Morland | Lawrence of Rome | | Medieval | Church of England | Leith Lyvennet Group | |
| St Kentigern, Mungrisdale | Mungrisdale | Mungo | | Medieval | Church of England | Greystoke Group | Rebuilt 1756 |
| Mosedale Friends Meeting House | Mungrisdale (Mosedale) | | | 1702 | Quakers | Cumberland Area Quakers | Most recently re-opened 1973 |
| St John the Baptist, Murton | Murton | John the Baptist | | 1856 | Church of England | Heart of Eden | |
| St Theobald, Musgrave | Musgrave | Theobald (?) | | Medieval | Church of England | Brough Group | Current building 1845 |
| Nateby Methodist Church | Nateby | | | | Methodist | Kirkby Stephen, Appleby, Tebay MC | |
| St Edmund, Newbiggin | Newbiggin | Edmund the Martyr | | Medieval | Church of England | Heart of Eden | |
| St James, Great Ormside | Ormside | James | | Medieval | Church of England | Heart of Eden | |
| All Saints, Orton | Orton | All Saints | | Medieval | Church of England | Shap Group | |
| Orton Methodist Church | Orton | | | | Methodist | Kirkby Stephen, Appleby, Tebay MC | |
| St Luke, Ousby | Ousby | Luke | | Medieval | Church of England | Cross Fell Group | Extensive rebuilding 1858 |
| St John the Baptist, Melmerby | Ousby (Melmerby) | John the Baptist | | Medieval | Church of England | Cross Fell Group | |
| St Patrick, Patterdale | Patterdale | Patrick | | Medieval | CoE / Methodist | Patterdale / Penrith Methodist Circuit | Rebuilt 1600, 1853. CoE, Methodist churches in LEP 1994 |
| St Andrew, Penrith | Penrith | Andrew | | Medieval | Church of England | Penrith Team | Rebuilt 1720-1722 |
| Christ Church, Penrith | Penrith | Jesus | | 1850 | Church of England | Penrith Team | |
| St Catherine, Penrith | Penrith | Catherine of Alex. | | 1850 | Catholic | | |
| Penrith Methodist Church | Penrith | | | Early C19th | Methodist | Penrith Methodist Circuit | Current building 1872 |
| Penrith & Penruddock URC | Penrith | | | 1660 | United Reformed | | Current building 1868 |
| Penrith Friends Meeting House | Penrith | | | 1697 | Quakers | Cumberland Area Quakers | |
| King's Church Eden | Penrith | Jesus | | 2002 | Newfrontiers | | |
| Church in the Barn | Penrith | | | 1980s | Independent | | |
| Influence Church Penrith | Penrith | | | 2016 | Assemblies of God | | |
| Penrith Gospel Hall | Penrith | | | | Gospel Hall | | |
| St Oswald, Ravenstonedale | Ravenstonedale | Oswald of N'umbria | | Medieval | Church of England | Shap Group | Rebuilt 1738-1744 |
| Ravenstonedale Methodist Church | Ravenstonedale | | | | Methodist | Kirkby Stephen, Appleby, Tebay MC | |
| Newbiggin-on-Lune Methodist Church | Ravenstonedale (Newbiggin) | | | | Methodist | Kirkby Stephen, Appleby, Tebay MC | |
| St Michael, Shap | Shap | Michael | | Ancient | Church of England | Shap Group | |
| Shap Methodist Church | Shap | | | | Methodist | Penrith Methodist Circuit | Meets in coffee shop since sale of chapel in 2006 |
| St Michael, Skelton | Skelton | Michael | | Medieval | Church of England | Inglewood Group | |
| Skelton Methodist Chapel | Skelton | | | | Methodist | Penrith Methodist Circuit | |
| St James, Hutton in the Forest | Skelton | James | | Medieval | Church of England | Inglewood Group | Rebuilt 1714 |
| Christ Church, Ivegill | Skelton (Ivegill) | Jesus | | 1868 | Church of England | Inglewood Group | |
| Sleagill Methodist Chapel | Sleagill | | | 1954 | Methodist | Penrith Methodist Circuit | |
| Soulby Methodist Church | Soulby | | | 1836 | Methodist | Kirkby Stephen, Appleby, Tebay MC | |
| St Stephen, Stainmore | Stainmore | Stephen | | 1608 | Church of England | Brough Group | Rebuilt 1842 |
| St James, Tebay | Tebay | James | | 1880 | Church of England | Shap Group | |
| Tebay Methodist Church | Tebay | | | | Methodist | Kirkby Stephen, Appleby, Tebay MC | |
| St James, Temple Sowerby | Temple Sowerby | James | | 1754 | Church of England | Heart of Eden | Probably earlier churches on site |
| St Mary, Threlkeld | Threlkeld | Mary | | Medieval | Church of England | St John's, Threlkeld, Wythburn | Rebuilt 1776. Benefice includes two churches in Allerdale |
| St Columba, Warcop | Warcop | Columba | | Medieval | Church of England | Brough Group | |
| Bleatarn Chapel | Warcop (Bleatarn) | | | 1864 | Church of England | Brough Group | |
| Warcop Methodist Church | Warcop | | | | Methodist | Kirkby Stephen, Appleby, Tebay MC | |
| Winton United Church | Winton | | | | Methodist/Baptist | Kirkby Stephen, Appleby, Tebay MC | Methodist and Baptist churches united 1989 |

== Defunct churches ==
| Name | Civil parish (settlement) | Dedication | Web | Founded | Redundant | Denomination | Notes |
|---|---|---|---|---|---|---|---|
| St John the Baptist, Croglin | Ainstable (Croglin) | John the Baptist | | 1878 | 2012 | Church of England | Village now served by All Saints, Renwick |
| Garrigill Methodist Chapel | Alston Moor (Garrigill) | | | | 2004 | Methodist | |
| Nenthead Methodist Chapel | Alston Moor (Nenthead) | | | | 2002 | Methodist | |
| St Ninian, Brougham | Brougham | Ninian | | Medieval | 1977 | Church of England | Current building 1660. Churches Conservation Trust |
| St John, Gamblesby | Glassonby (Gamblesby) | John ? | | 1868 | 2010 | Church of England | |
| Kirkby Thore Methodist Chapel | Kirkby Thore | | | | 2006 | Methodist | |
