= Inglewood Forest =

Large area of land in Cumbria, England

Coordinates: 54°47′N 2°55′W

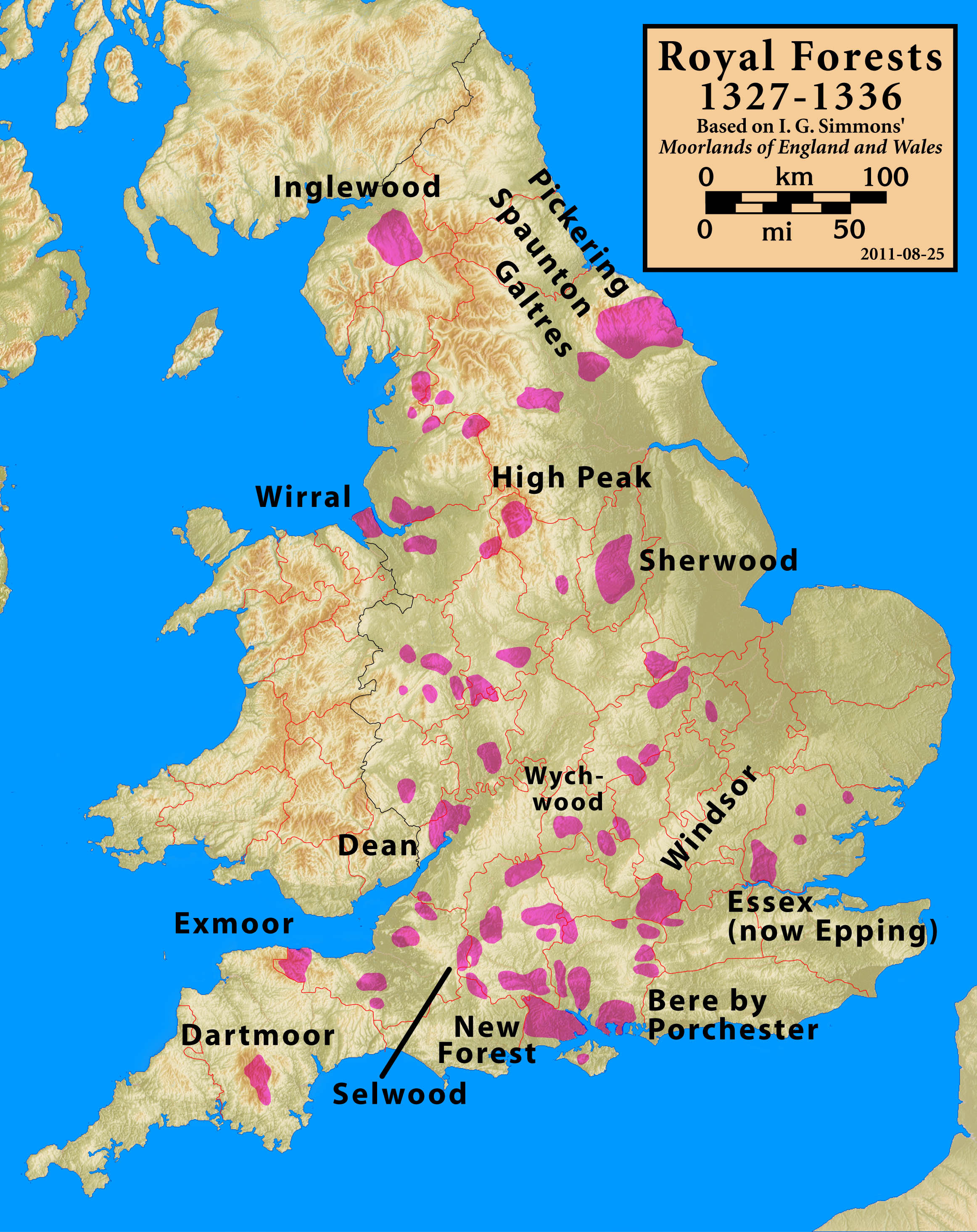

Inglewood Forest is a large tract of mainly arable and dairy farm land with a few small woodland areas between Carlisle and Penrith in the English non-metropolitan county of Cumbria or ancient county of Cumberland.

== Etymology ==
Inglewood is first attested in the forms Englewod’ (c. 1150), Engelwode (c. 1158) and Englewud (1227). The name means "Wood of the English or Angles". This seems to reflect a situation where, at the time of the name's formation, Cumbria was still predominantly a Celtic-speaking region, and sometimes part of the Kingdom of Strathclyde, and English settlement or land-ownership was still unusual enough to be a distinctive feature in a place-name. Noting that the other place-names of this kind are in places that were border areas between English-speaking and Britonnic-speaking cultures, Jayne Carroll and John Baker suggest that "this is perhaps not a case of a 'minority population' name, but one used with a particular political significance to mark a borderland area".

== History ==
Soon after the Norman Conquest of England this area became a royal forest. The word forest in this sense did not necessarily mean a wooded area but one that was set aside for hunting, though several areas of Inglewood were heavily wooded. The animals that were hunted in this area were mainly deer and wild boars.

The forest boundaries changed many times and included at one time most of the Cumberland wards of Leath and Cumberland but the core or heart of the forest was the parishes of Hesket-in-the-Forest, Skelton and Hutton-in-the-Forest. Higham places the "core of the forest between the Chalk Beck and the River Petteril, in particular the townships and civil parishes of Dalston, Sebergham, Hesket, Mungrisdale, Catterlen, Hutton, Skelton, and Castle Sowerby".

The forest ultimately belonged to the English Crown and was governed by the strict forest law exercised by wardens. In the reign of Henry VIII the forest laws were repealed and Inglewood ceased to be a royal forest although it is still to this day marked on maps as such".

The borough and city of Carlisle (the area within the city walls) was outside the forest though Penrith was within it and was the main administrative centre and market town for the southern part of the region.

Border reivers were active in the area and it contains a number of fortified buildings referred to as Peel towers.

Grid reference	Name	Location	NHLE	Sources for "peel"/"pele"
NY505458	Armathwaite Castle	Armathwaite	1145496	Pevsner; Ordnance Survey
NY476384	Brackenburgh Tower	Calthwaite	1145499	Pevsner; see Perriam and Robinson
NY478320	Catterlen Hall	Catterlen	1012829	Pevsner
NY475524	Cote House	Wetheral	1111822	Perriam and Robinson, and also Pevsner, say Bastle house; Ordnance Survey
NY376515	Dalston Hall	Dalston	1087441	Ordnance Survey
NY551367	St Cuthbert's Church	Great Salkeld	1100260	RIBA
NY403433	High Head Castle	Ivegill		Perriam and Robinson
NY518302	Hutton Hall	Penrith	1326922	NHLE; see Perriam and Robinson
NY460357	Hutton in the Forest	near Skelton	1210817	Pevsner
NY433509	Newbiggin Hall	St Cuthbert Without	1087720	Pevsner
NY396436	Thistlewood	Ivegill	1326687	Pevsner; see Perriam and Robinson
NY433499	Woodside	St Cuthbert Without		see Perriam and Robinson

== Literature ==
The Forest is the setting of many of the adventures in the late medieval Northern Gawain Group of Middle English chivalric romances. Around the same time, Andrew of Wyntoun's Orygynale Chronicle (written c. 1420) claims the forest as the original setting of the Robin Hood legend:

Lytil Jhon and Robyne Hude
Wayth-men ware commendyd gude
In Yngil-wode and Barnysdale
Thai oysyd all this tyme thare trawale.

According to legend, Inglewood Forest is also home to the outlaws Adam Bell, William of Cloudsley and Clym of the Clough. Their story is told in Child Ballad 116.

== Honour of Penrith ==
The manors of Penrith, Great Salkeld, Langwathby, Carlatton (not Carleton as it sometimes said to be), Castle Sowerby and Scotby were collectively known as the Honour of Penrith. Glassonby and Gamblesby were sometimes included in the Honour. The manors were given to the Scottish crown in exchange for Scotland giving up its claim to all of Cumberland. In 1272 King Alexander III complained that a William de Leyburne, the local seneschal, has unlawfully appropriated the manors' rents. Later Edward I took them for himself. Later they passed to the Neville family but came back to being Crown property during the Wars of the Roses and remained so until the joint reign of William III and Mary II. The honour was also known as "The Queen's Hames" due to the fact the manors were often given to a Queen consort on her marriage or at the death of the previous consort. The last Queen consort to be Lady of the Manor or Honour was Queen Catherine of Braganza, consort of Charles II.

William III gave the lands belonging to the manor to his friend William Bentinck, 1st Earl of Portland whose descendants later sold them to their relatives the Cavendish family.

== See also ==
- Baron Inglewood
- Clim of the Clough
- Whinfell Forest

== Sources ==
- Parker, F.H.M. (1905). "Inglewood Forest : part 1". Transactions of the Cumberland and Westmorland Antiquarian and Archaeological Society. 2nd series. 5. Carlisle: The Society: 35–61. doi:10.5284/1064588.
- Parker, F.H.M. (1906). "Inglewood Forest : part 2". Transactions of the Cumberland and Westmorland Antiquarian and Archaeological Society. 2nd series. 6. Carlisle: The Society: 159–170. doi:10.5284/1064481.
- Parker, F.H.M. (1907). "Inglewood Forest : part 3". Transactions of the Cumberland and Westmorland Antiquarian and Archaeological Society. 2nd series. 7. Carlisle: The Society: 1–30. doi:10.5284/1064405.
- Parker, F.H.M. (1909). "Inglewood Forest : part 4". Transactions of the Cumberland and Westmorland Antiquarian and Archaeological Society. 2nd series. 9. Carlisle: The Society: 24–37. doi:10.5284/1064211.
- Parker, F.H.M. (1910). "Inglewood Forest : part 5-6". Transactions of the Cumberland and Westmorland Antiquarian and Archaeological Society. 2nd series. 10. Carlisle: The Society: 1–28. doi:10.5284/1064145.
- Parker, F.H.M. (1911). "Inglewood Forest : part 7". Transactions of the Cumberland and Westmorland Antiquarian and Archaeological Society. 2nd series. 11. Carlisle: The Society: 1–37. doi:10.5284/1064056.
