= Listed buildings in Hesket, Cumbria =

Hesket is a civil parish in Westmorland and Furness, Cumbria, England. It contains 65 listed buildings that are recorded in the National Heritage List for England. Of these, three are listed at Grade II*, the middle of the three grades, and the others are at Grade II, the lowest grade. The parish is largely rural, and contains the villages of High Hesket, Low Hesket, Armathwaite, Plumpton, Calthwaite, Southwaite, and smaller settlements. Most of the listed buildings are houses and associated structures, farmhouses and farm buildings. The Settle-Carlisle Line of the former Midland Railway passes through the eastern part of the parish, and two viaducts on the line are listed. Two of the buildings originated as tower houses or fortified houses, and have since been extended into country houses. The other listed buildings include churches and items in the churchyards, a chapel, public houses, a former water mill, a well head, bridges, a monument, a war memorial, and three boundary stones.

== Key ==
| Grade | Criteria |
|---|---|
| II* | Particularly important buildings of more than special interest |
| II | Buildings of national importance and special interest |

== Buildings ==
| Name and location | Photograph | Date | Notes | Grade |
|---|---|---|---|---|
| Armathwaite Castle; 54.80530°N 2.77043°W | | Mid 15th century (probable) | Originally a fortified house, it was later altered and extended to become a country house. The original part has thick sandstone walls, a façade of calciferous sandstone with a cornice and parapet, a double span plan, and a green slate roof. The extension is in calciferous sandstone with a Mansard tiled roof. The building is in 2 1/2 storeys, with a basement in the earlier part, and each part has five bays. The doorway has a quoined surround, with a keyed lintel, a plain frieze and a cornice. | II* |
| Southwaite Hall, Copper House and barns 54.79958°N 2.85657°W | — | Mid 16th century | A house that was altered and extended in 1628 and in the late 18th century, and has since been divided into two dwellings. The house has two storeys and a green slate roof, the original part has six bays and is roughcast, The extension to the left (Copper House) is higher, it has two storeys and quoins. Some of the windows are mullioned, and most are sashes. The doorway in the original house has a chamfered surround. To the right of the house, and partly incorporated in it, are sandstone barns that have an L-shaped plan. They contain various openings and a re-used dated lintel. | II* |
| Plumpton Hall; 54.71263°N 2.78529°W | — | Late 16th century | A farmhouse that was extensively altered and extended in the 19th century, it is in rendered sandstone with a green slate roof. There are two storeys, the original house has two bays, with later flanking lower bays. The door has a stone surround. The windows vary; some are sashes, some are casements, and others date from the 16th century. The rear was originally a stable, and has a blocked segmental arch and external stone steps leading to a loft door. | II |
| The Old Tower; 54.73786°N 2.81484°W | — | 1600 | This originated as a tower house that was incorporated into a new house in 1852, and was further altered in 1902 when Robert Lorimer built the country house of Brackenburgh at right angles, and connected it by an orangery. The building is in sandstone, and the extension has a green slate roof with crow-stepped gables. The original tower has very thick walls, three storeys, mullioned windows with hood moulds, and a battlemented parapet. The extension has two and three storeys, three bays, and a 20th-century doorway. | II |
| Chapel of Christ and St Mary; 54.80822°N 2.77011°W | — | Early 17th century | The chapel is built in large blocks of sandstone, and it has a roof of sandstone slate with coped gables and cross finials. The chapel consists of a nave and chancel as a single cell, and has a north vestry with a flat roof and shaped parapets. On the west gable is an open bellcote. The south door has a chamfered surround, and the windows have round heads. | II |
| Wreay Hall Mill; 54.83371°N 2.87034°W | — | 1663 | A water-powered corn mill and drying kiln that were remodelled in 1808, it is in sandstone with quoins, and has a roof of slate and sandstone. The building has an L-shaped plan, the kiln being stepped back from the main block, and with a wheelhouse outshut at the rear. Much of the machinery remains, including the waterwheel, gear wheels, drive shafts and a hoist. | II |
| The White House; 54.79201°N 2.81703°W | | Late 17th century | The house was extended at a right angle in the late 18th century. It is stuccoed, and has a roof partly in green slate and partly in sandstone slate. There are two storeys, each part has three bays, and the angle between the two parts is bowed. The doorway has a stone surround, and the windows are sashes, one being horizontally-sliding. | II |
| Ivy Dene and former stables 54.72528°N 2.78916°W | — | 1677 | The house and stables are in sandstone and have a slate roof with coped gables. The house has two storeys and four bays. The doorway has a chamfered surround and a dated lintel, and the windows are mullioned with chamfered surrounds and continuous hood moulds. The stables to the left date from the early 19th century, and have two storeys and three bays. The contain a door with a fanlight, a cart entrance with a segmental head, and sash windows in stone surrounds. Inside the house is an inglenook. | II |
| Barrockside; 54.82179°N 2.85035°W | — | 1695 | A farmhouse that was later altered and extended, it is roughcast with quoins and a green slate roof. There are two storeys, three bays, a single-bay extension to the right, and a 19th-century double-depth extension at the rear. The doorway has an architrave and a dated lintel. The windows are sashes, the earlier ones in architraves, and the later windows in painted stone surrounds. | II |
| Inglewood House; 54.77828°N 2.81543°W | — | 1700 | The farmhouse was extended at right angles in the early 19th century. It is rendered, the earlier part has a roof of sandstone slate, and the later part has a hipped Welsh slate roof. There are two storeys, and each part has three bays. The later part has quoins, an eaves modillioned cornice, and a parapet. In the earlier part is a doorway with a chamfered surround, and in the later part there is a Tuscan doorcase with a modillioned pediment. The windows in both parts are sashes in stone surrounds. | II |
| Holly Cottage; 54.79174°N 2.81698°W | — | Late 17th or early 18th century | The house was extended in the 19th century. It is in stone and has a roof of Welsh slate with some sandstone slate. There are two storeys, an original part of three bays and an extension to the left of two bays. The doorway in the centre of the original part has a stone surround. In the ground floor are a mullioned window and a fire window, and in the upper floor are horizontally-sliding sash windows. The windows in the extension are casements. All the windows have stone surrounds. | II |
| Southwaite Park and former barn 54.79724°N 2.86233°W | — | 1704 | A house that was later altered and extended, it is roughcast on a chamfered plinth, and has quoins, an eaves cornice, and a roof of green slate with some Welsh slate, coped gables, and a sandstone ridge. There are two storeys, three bays, and a three-bay left extension. The doorway has an alternate block surround and a keyed lintel. The windows are sashes in stone surrounds, and in the extension are dormer windows. The barn extends at right angles to the rear, it is in sandstone, and contains a doorway with a chamfered surround. | II |
| St Mary's Church; 54.79221°N 2.81645°W | | 1720 | The church incorporates material from an earlier medieval church. It is built in roughcast red sandstone and calciferous sandstone, and has a green slate roof with coped gables. The church consists of a nave, a two-storey west porch, a north aisle, and a chancel with a north vestry and lean-to sheds. On the west gable is a double bellcote, and external steps lead to an upper door on the north side. The windows on the sides are round-headed. Inside the church the open timber roof and the chancel arch are late medieval. | II* |
| Fieldhead Cottage; 54.74480°N 2.84621°W | — | Early 18th century | A stone house that has a roof of green slate with some sandstone slate. There are two storeys, three bays, sash windows in chamfered surrounds, and a plank porch on the left side. | II |
| Wayside Cottages; 54.75215°N 2.82791°W | — | Early 18th century | A row of five houses at right angles to the road forming a terrace. They are in sandstone with quoins and a Welsh slate roof. The houses have two storeys and one bay each, and the doorways and sash windows have raised sandstone surrounds. | II |
| Dovecote, Wreay Hall Farm; 54.82791°N 2.87001°W | — | Early 18th century | The dovecote is in calciferous sandstone with eaves modillions, and a pyramidal green slate roof with lead ridges. On top of the roof is an open wooden fountain. The dovecote has an octagonal plan, a single storey, and a doorway. Some shelves remain inside. | II |
| Lowstreet Cottage; 54.72487°N 2.80265°W | — | 1728 | A sandstone farmhouse with quoins and a green slate roof. There are two storeys, three bays, and a rear extension. The central doorway has a stone surround and above it is a shaped datestone. Most of the windows are sashes, there is a blocked fire window, and at the rear is a round-headed stair window. | II |
| Armathwaite Bridge; 54.80680°N 2.76832°W | | 18th century | The bridge carries a road over the River Eden. It is in sandstone, and was widened and rebuilt in 1907–08. The bridge consists of three round arches with two splayed cutwaters. On the parapet is an inscribed stone. | II |
| Former font 54.72682°N 2.78232°W | — | 18th century | The font of the former church is in the churchyard of the Church of St John the Evangelist. It is in Penrith sandstone, and consists of a simple baluster. The font forms the central feature of a garden of remembrance. | II |
| Low House; 54.70565°N 2.78806°W | — | Late 18th century | A roughcast farmhouse with a green slate roof, two storeys and three bays. The doorway and windows have stone surrounds. | II |
| East Lodge, Barrock Park; 54.81603°N 2.84096°W | — | Late 18th century | The lodge is at the entrance to the grounds from the A6 road and is in Gothic style. The lodge is rendered with angle pilasters and a hipped green slate roof. It has a single storey, two bays, and a double depth plan. Above the door is a fanlight with an ogee head, and the sash windows have stone surrounds also with ogee heads. | II |
| Lowstreet House; 54.72405°N 2.80226°W | — | Late 18th century | A roughcast farmhouse with quoins, an eaves cornice, and a green slate roof. There are two storeys, three bays and a right-angled extension to the rear, giving an L-shaped plan. The central doorway has a Tuscan doorcase with a dentilled pediment containing a vase and scrollwork. The windows are sashes in stone surrounds. | II |
| Petteril Bank; 54.77837°N 2.83614°W | — | Late 18th century | A sandstone farmhouse with quoins, a string course, and a green slate roof with coped gables. There are two storeys and three bays. The doorway has a pilastered surround and a pediment, and the windows are sashes in stone surrounds. | II |
| Plumpton Old Hall; 54.72141°N 2.78024°W | — | Late 18th century | A house in rendered sandstone with quoins, and a green slate roof with coped gables. There are two storeys and five bays, with a two-bay extension at the rear, giving an L-shaped plan. The central doorway has rusticated pilasters and a pediment. The windows are sashes, there is a round-headed staircase window, and a canted bay window. At the rear is a doorway with pilasters and a pediment. | II |
| Salkeld Gate; 54.72616°N 2.78196°W | — | Late 18th century | A stuccoed house with a green slate roof, it has two storeys and four bays. The doorway and sash windows have stone surrounds. The window above the door is blocked. | II |
| Dovecote, The Manor; 54.81033°N 2.85172°W | — | Late 18th century | The dovecote is in stuccoed stone, and has a coved cornice and a green slate roof with lead ridges. On the roof is an arcaded wooden drum with an ogee lead cupola surmounted by a weathervane in the form of a fox. The dovecote is octagonal, and has two doors with alternate block surround. The windows are fixed with stone surrounds, and inside are nesting boxes and stone shelves. | II |
| The Manor; 54.80935°N 2.85454°W | — | 1780 | A house with a 17th-century core and with additions in the 19th century. It is roughcast on a chamfered plinth, and has quoins and a hipped green slate roof. The front has two storeys, five bays, and a single-bay extension. There is a parallel range of 2 1/2 storeys and six bays, flanked by projecting three-bay and single-bay wings. On the front is a pilastered porch and a door with a radial fanlight, above which is a Venetian window flanked by niches and oval panels. The windows are sashes. | II |
| Barn opposite Lowstreet House; 54.72434°N 2.80207°W | — | 1794 | The barn is in sandstone with a sandstone slate roof. There are two storeys and two bays, and a single-bay extension to the right. In the main part is a large segmental-headed entrance with a dated keystone, a smaller, partly blocked, segmental headed doorway, a casement window, ventilation slits, and external steps leading to a loft door. In the extension are plank doors and casement windows. | II |
| Streethead; 54.77325°N 2.88855°W | — | 1794 | A stuccoed farmhouse with a green slate roof. There are two storeys, two bays and flanking single-bay wings. The doorway has an architrave and a pediment, and the windows are sashes in stone surrounds. On the front is an oval panel with initials and the date. | II |
| Cross Keys Hotel; 54.79785°N 2.82275°W | | Late 18th or early 19th century | A former public house, stuccoed, with quoins and a green slate roof. There are two storeys and three bays, and a projecting extension on the right. The windows are sashes, above the door is a pediment, and they all have stone surrounds. | II |
| Ellerton Grange; 54.81218°N 2.86770°W | — | Late 18th or early 19th century | A stuccoed farmhouse with quoins and a green slate roof. There are two storeys, three bays, a central doorway with a quoined surround, and sash windows in stone surrounds. | II |
| Mellguards; 54.80601°N 2.86505°W | — | Late 18th or early 19th century | A stuccoed farmhouse with quoins, and a green slate roof with coped gables. There are two storeys, four bays, a central doorway with a shouldered architrave, and sash windows in architraves. | II |
| Southwaite Hill and Moorhouse Hill; 54.79809°N 2.84861°W | — | Late 18th or early 19th century | Originally one house, later divided into two dwellings, it is roughcast with quoins and a green slate roof. The house has two storeys, with a three-bay front, and a rear extension of four bays. On the front the central doorway has fluted pilasters, Corinthian capitals, an urn-and-ribbon frieze, and a pediment, and this is flanked by canted bay windows. Elsewhere the windows are sashes. | II |
| Salutation Inn; 54.79230°N 2.81699°W | | Late 18th or early 19th century | A rendered public house on a chamfered plinth, with a hipped roof of mixed Welsh and green slate. There are two storeys and two bays, with a lower two-bay extension to the right. The doorway has a chamfered surround, and the windows, which are sashes, have stone surrounds. There are some fixed windows in the extension. | II |
| The Elephant; 54.77397°N 2.85095°W | | Late 18th or early 19th century | A rendered farmhouse with a green slate roof, two storeys, three bays, and lower recessed two-storey one-bay extensions on both sides. The doorway has a stone surround and a pediment, and the windows, which are sashes, also have stone surrounds. | II |
| Bull's Head Farmhouse; 54.75071°N 2.79387°W | | 1804 | The farmhouse, once a public house, is roughcast with quoins and a green slate roof. There are two storeys, three bays and a lower projecting extension on the right. The doorway has a quoined surrounds, and the sash windows have stone surrounds. | II |
| Barrock Gill; 54.80980°N 2.84138°W | — | 1818 | A farmhouse in calciferous sandstone with quoins and a green slate roof. There are two storeys and three bays. The doorway and sash windows have stone surrounds. | II |
| Boundary stone 54.74691°N 2.81985°W | — | Early 19th century | The stone marked the boundary between the parishes of Calthwaite and Plumpton. It is in sandstone, square with a pyramidal cap, and set at an angle to the road. On the sides are inscribed the names of the parishes. | II |
| Boundary stone 54.77759°N 2.81138°W | — | Early 19th century | The stone marked the boundary between the parishes of Upper Heslet and Plumpton. It is in sandstone, it is triangular with a pyramidal cap, and is set against the inner face of the Blackrock Bridge. On the sides are inscribed the names of the parishes. | II |
| Boundary stone 54.77809°N 2.81099°W | — | Early 19th century | The stone marked the boundary between the parishes of Upper Heslet and Lazonby. It is in sandstone, and consists of a square block set at an angle to the road, and with a slightly damaged corner. On the sides are inscribed the names of the parishes. | II |
| Broadfield House; 54.79024°N 2.87282°W | — | Early 19th century | A stuccoed house on a chamfered plinth, with a blocking course, rusticated angle pilasters, and a hipped green slate roof. There are two storeys and four bays, with a single-storey three-bay extension forming an L-shaped plan. On the right side is a doorway with a pilastered surround, a radial fanlight, and a pediment. The windows are sashes in stucco surrounds. | II |
| Crook's Bridge; 54.82476°N 2.86927°W | | Early 19th century | The bridge carries a road over the River Petteril. It is in red sandstone and calciferous sandstone, and consists of three segmental arches. The bridge has piers with splayed cutwaters, solid chamfered parapets, and square end piers with shaped caps. | II |
| Barns and gin gang, Ellerton Grange; 54.81238°N 2.86801°W | — | Early 19th century | The barns and gin gang are in mixed sandstone and split cobbles, and have quoins and a roof of Welsh and green slate. The barns are at right angles forming an L-shaped plan, and contain doorways, windows, entrances with segmental arches, and loft doors. At the rear of the left barn is a gin gang. | II |
| Hesket House; 54.79156°N 2.81625°W | | Early 19th century | A roughcast farmhouse on a chamfered plinth, with quoins and a green slate roof. There are two storeys, four bays, a round-headed doorway with a pilastered surround and a modillioned cornice, and sash windows with stone surrounds. | II |
| Petteril Green and stables 54.76633°N 2.81599°W | — | Early 19th century | The farmhouse is in rendered sandstone on a squared plinth, with quoins, an eaves cornice, a parapet, and a hipped green slate roof. There are two storeys, five bays, flanking single-bay wings, and a stable at right angles to the rear. On the front is a prostyle Ionic porch and a door with a fanlight. The windows are sashes in stone surrounds, and above the porch is a French window. The stable has a segmental-arched cart entrance and sash windows. | II |
| Barns, Petteril Green; 54.76677°N 2.81584°W | — | Early 19th century | The barns are in sandstone with quoins, and have roofs partly of green slate and partly of asbestos sheet. They are in two storeys and have three ranges, forming a U-shaped plan. The openings include doorways, windows, a large cart entrance with a segmental head and a quoined surround, loft doors, and ventilation slits. | II |
| Plumptonfoot Bridge; 54.74915°N 2.80273°W | | Early 19th century | The bridge carries a road over the River Petteril. It is in sandstone, and consists of a single segmental arch with recessed voussoirs, and a solid parapet with chamfered coping. | II |
| Stable range, Southwaite Hill; 54.79778°N 2.84797°W | — | Early 19th century | The stable range is rendered with a green slate roof. In the centre is a tower with a pyramidal roof. This is flanked by wings and rear extensions, giving a U-shaped plan. There is a central large segmental-headed carriage entrance with a quoined surround, and the other openings include doorways and sash windows. | II |
| Thornbarrow Farmhouse; 54.70505°N 2.80904°W | — | Early 19th century | The farmhouse is stuccoed with quoins, and has two storeys and three bays. The central doorway has a pilastered surround and a fanlight, and the windows are sashes in stone surrounds. | II |
| Parker family vault 54.79214°N 2.81592°W | — | 1828 | The family vault is in the churchyard of St Mary's Church. It is in Gothic style, and is built in calciferous sandstone. The building is square, and has angle buttresses, a moulded plinth, and parapet stones carved with leaves and quatrefoils. There is a cast iron door, and side windows, all with pointed heads. | II |
| Wreay Bridge; 54.82839°N 2.87221°W | | 1830s | The bridge carries a road over the River Petteril. It is in sandstone and consists of three round-headed arches. The bridge has two piers with rounded cutwaters, voussoirs, a string course, and a coped parapet. | II |
| Calthwaite Hall; 54.75442°N 2.82581°W | — | c. 1837 | A country house in sandstone on a chamfered plinth, with string courses, a parapet, and a green slate roof with a central octagonal dome. There are two storeys, three bays, and a two-bay extension on the left. On the front is a Gothic porch with a doorway and side lights, all with pointed arches. The windows are casements with chamfered surrounds and hood moulds. On the right side is a canted bay window containing pointed Gothic windows. Inside the house under the dome is a spiral staircase and a gallery. | II |
| Blue Bell House; 54.74510°N 2.79054°W | — | 1842 | The house, at one time a public house, is in Penrith sandstone with quoins and a green slate roof. There are two storeys, three bays, a doorway with a quoined surround and a fanlight, and sash windows in stone surrounds. | II |
| Hay Close southwest farmstead and leat 54.75968°N 2.86761°W | — | Mid 19th century | This part of the farmstead consists of a water-powered threshing barn, a wheelhouse, a granary, a barn, and an associated leat. The buildings are in sandstone with quoins and have hipped roofs of corrugated steel. They form two sides of a courtyard and incorporate the main arched entrance to the yard, and they are fed from the northeast by a leat. | II |
| Middle Bridge; 54.72442°N 2.79400°W | | 1855 | The bridge carries a road over the River Petteril. It is in sandstone, and consists of a single segmental arch with an overflow channel. The bridge has rusticated voussoirs, a string course, and solid parapets. The overflow channel has two vaulted passages. | II |
| Katharine Well; 54.80706°N 2.86996°W | — | 1866 | A well head with drinking troughs in sandstone. There is a central round arch over the spring, flanked by two smaller arches on each side, all leading into the troughs. Above is an arcade of tall arches, with a central inscribed green slate plaque. | II |
| Armathwaite Viaduct; 54.79858°N 2.77963°W | | 1875 | The viaduct was built for the Settle-Carlisle Line of the Midland Railway, and is in sandstone with brick soffits. It is 176 yards (161 m) long, and consists of nine arches, each with a span of 45 feet (14 m). The piers are tapering and have imposts, there is a continuous band at the level of the track, and a solid parapet. | II |
| Drybeck Viaduct; 54.82345°N 2.76593°W | | 1875 | The viaduct was built for the Settle-Carlisle Line of the Midland Railway, and is in sandstone with brick soffits. It is 139 yards (127 m) long, and consists of seven arches, each with a span of 45 feet (14 m). The piers are tapering and have imposts, there is a continuous band at the level of the track, and a solid parapet. | II |
| Byrnes Monument; 54.72590°N 2.78330°W | | 1885 | A memorial to a policeman who was killed on duty. It is in sandstone, and has a chamfered surround, a shaped pediment, and an inscribed recessed plaque. | II |
| Brackenburgh; 54.73803°N 2.81545°W | — | 1902 | A country house designed by Robert Lorimer in Tudor style, and attached to The Old Tower by an orangery. It is in Lazonby sandstone with quoins, a parapet, and a green slate roof. There are two storeys, numerous bays, and an irregular L-shaped plan. Its features include a round-arched loggia, mullioned and transomed windows, canted bay windows, an oriel window flanked by lions, and a polygonal angle turret. | II |
| Gate piers, Brackenburgh; 54.73491°N 2.80809°W | — | 1902 | The gate piers flanking the entry to the drive were designed by Robert Lorimer. They are in calciferous sandstone, and are square on chamfered bases with pedimented caps. | II |
| Lodge, Brackenburgh; 54.73482°N 2.80804°W | — | 1902–03 | The lodge was designed by Robert Lorimer, it is in Lazonby sandstone, and has a mansard roof in green slate. There are three bays, the central bay having two storeys and the lower flanking bays one storey each. In the right wing is a doorway above which is a coat of arms, and the roof of this bay is conical. Some of the windows are sashes, and others are casements. | II |
| Church of St John the Evangelist; 54.72695°N 2.78242°W | | 1907 | The church, by Robert Lorimer, is in Penrith sandstone with a green slate roof. It is a small church that consists of a nave with a south porch, a chancel with a north vestry, and a south tower. The tower has two stages, a round-arched doorway, a projecting angle turret, square bell openings, and a parapet with shaped battlements. On the west angle buttress is a datestone. | II |
| Lychgate; 54.72662°N 2.78206°W | — | After 1918 | The lychgate is at the entrance to the churchyard of the Church of St John the Evangelist, and was built as a war memorial to the First World War. It has side walls in sandstone, a timber frame, and a hipped roof in sandstone slate. The gates are shaped and are in oak. | II |
| Calthwaite War Memorial; 54.75320°N 2.82584°W | — | 1921 | The war memorial is in the churchyard of All Saints Church. It is in Aberdeen granite, and consists of a rough-hewn cross with a wreath on the centre of the cross, on a rough-hewn plinth. The plinth is divided, on the right part is a carved helmet and rifle, and the left part is smooth and contains an inscription and the names of those lost in the First World War. | II |
| High Hesket War Memorial; 54.79441°N 2.81884°W | | 1920 | The war memorial is in the churchyard of Grade II* listed St Mary's Church. Latin cross over 3m tall with carved laurel wreath. Carved scroll reading "They rest from their labours". Carved pedestal with inscribed names, unusual for using the term "2nd Great War". | II |
