= Morton, Westmorland and Furness =

Hamlet in Cumbria, England

Coordinates: 54.748°N 2.856°W

Morton
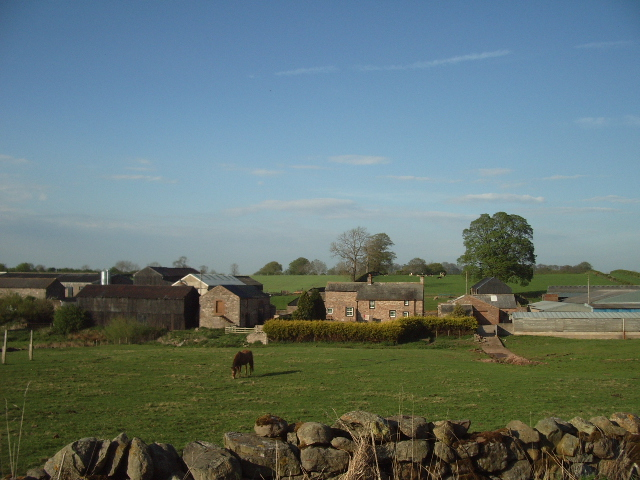

- Location in the former Eden District, Cumbria Location within Cumbria
- OS grid reference: NY449395
- Civil parish: Hesket; Skelton
- Unitary authority: Westmorland and Furness
- Ceremonial county: Cumbria
- Region: North West
- Country: England
- Sovereign state: United Kingdom
- Post town: PENRITH
- Postcode district: CA11
- Dialling code: 01768
- Police: Cumbria
- Fire: Cumbria
- Ambulance: North West
- UK Parliament: Penrith and Solway

Morton is a hamlet near the village of Calthwaite, in the civil parishes of Hesket and Skelton, within the Westmorland and Furness district of the ceremonial county of Cumbria, England.
