= Plumpton railway station (Cumbria) =

Former railway station in Cumbria, England

General information
- Location: Plumpton, Westmorland and Furness; England
- Coordinates: 54.7258°N 2.7978°W
- Grid reference: NY487370
- Platforms: 2

Other information
- Status: Disused

History
- Original company: Lancaster and Carlisle Railway
- Pre-grouping: London and North Western Railway
- Post-grouping: London, Midland and Scottish Railway

Key dates
- 17 December 1846: Opened
- 31 May 1948: Closed to passengers
- 1948: Closed to goods
Location

Plumpton railway station in Hesket parish in what is now Cumbria but was then Cumberland in the north west of England, was situated on the Lancaster and Carlisle Railway (the West Coast Main Line) between Carlisle and Penrith. It served the village of Plumpton and the surrounding hamlets. The station opened on 17 December 1846, and closed on 31 May 1948.

== The station ==
The station was situated in the part of the village called Brockleymoor and had two platforms, a signal box, a station master's house and railway workers' cottages. The relatively sizeable goods yard had a weighing machine, crane, coal yard and cattle pens. The station house and goods yard buildings remain as a pottery outlet, but the platforms have been demolished. The line through the station site has been electrified and becomes triple-tracked at that point for a short distance towards Carlisle.

== Stations on the line ==
The next station on the line towards Carlisle was Calthwaite and the preceding station was Penrith.
