= Southwaite railway station =

Former railway station in Cumbria, England

Southwaite

General information
- Location: Southwaite, Westmorland and Furness; England
- Coordinates: 54.7980°N 2.8582°W
- Grid reference: NY449451
- Platforms: 2

Other information
- Status: Disused

History
- Original company: Lancaster and Carlisle Railway
- Pre-grouping: London and North Western Railway
- Post-grouping: London, Midland and Scottish Railway

Key dates
- 17 December 1846: Opened
- 7 April 1952: Closed to passengers
- 1964: Closed to goods
Location

Southwaite railway station in Hesket parish, was situated on the Lancaster and Carlisle Railway (the West Coast Main Line) between Carlisle and Penrith. It served the village of Southwaite, Cumbria, England. The station opened in 1846, and closed on 7 April 1952.

== Station buildings ==
The station had two platforms, an overbridge, a station hotel, railway cottages and a signal box. The station house remains as a private dwelling, however the platforms have been demolished. The line has been electrified.

== Stations on the line ==
The next station on the line towards Carlisle was Wreay and the preceding station was Calthwaite.
