= Calthwaite railway station =

Former railway station in Cumbria, England

General information
- Location: Calthwaite, Westmorland and Furness; England
- Coordinates: 54.7566°N 2.8187°W
- Grid reference: NY474404
- Platforms: 2

Other information
- Status: Disused

History
- Original company: Lancaster and Carlisle Railway
- Pre-grouping: London and North Western Railway
- Post-grouping: London, Midland and Scottish Railway

Key dates
- 26 July 1847: Opened
- 7 April 1952: Closed to passengers
- 1956: Closed to goods
Location

Calthwaite railway station in Hesket parish, was situated on the Lancaster and Carlisle Railway (the West Coast Main Line) between Carlisle and Penrith. It served the village of Calthwaite, Cumbria, England. The station opened in 1847, and closed on 7 April 1952.

== The station ==
The station had two platforms, a signal box and a station master's house. The relatively sizeable goods yard had a weighing house, coal yard and cattle pens. Only the station master's house remains, as a private dwelling, the platforms have been demolished and the line has been electrified.

== Stations on the line ==
The next station on the line towards Carlisle was Southwaite and the preceding station was Plumpton.
