= Aiketgate =

Village in Hesket, Cumbria, England

Coordinates: 54.812°N 2.809°W

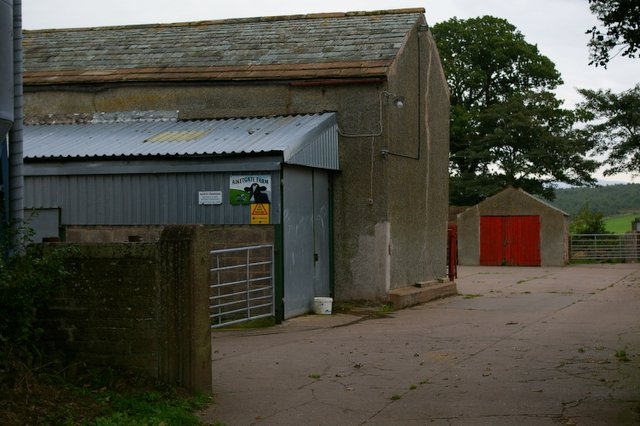
- Aiketgate Farm

- Location in Eden, Cumbria Location within Cumbria
- OS grid reference: NY480466
- Civil parish: Hesket
- Unitary authority: Westmorland and Furness
- Ceremonial county: Cumbria
- Region: North West
- Country: England
- Sovereign state: United Kingdom
- Post town: CARLISLE
- Postcode district: CA4
- Dialling code: 016974
- Police: Cumbria
- Fire: Cumbria
- Ambulance: North West
- UK Parliament: Penrith and Solway

Aiketgate is a small village in the English county of Cumbria. It is within the civil parish of Hesket.

Development of wind turbines in the Eden Valley has drawn attention to Aiketgate. A company called Harmony Energy Ltd. has plans to erect a 77-metre-high (253 ft) mast at Barrock End Farm in Aiketgate. These plans are opposed by the campaign group- NO2AWT.
