= Plumpton, Cumbria =

Village in England

Coordinates: 54.727316°N 2.781814°W

Plumpton
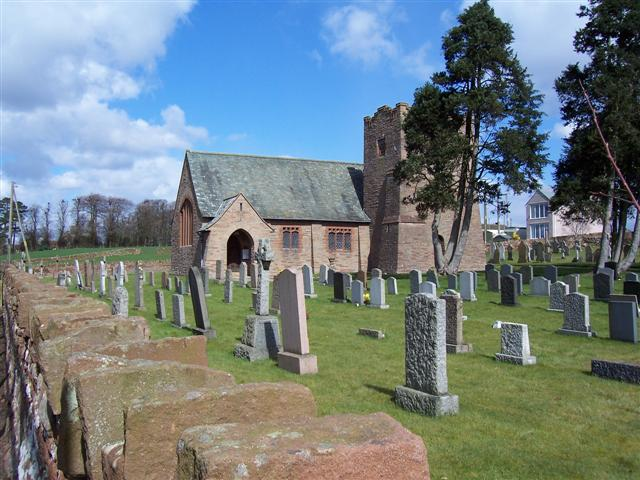
- St. John the Evangelist parish church, Plumpton

- Location in the former Eden, Cumbria Location within Cumbria
- OS grid reference: NY496372
- Civil parish: Hesket
- Unitary authority: Westmorland and Furness
- Ceremonial county: Cumbria
- Region: North West
- Country: England
- Sovereign state: United Kingdom
- Post town: PENRITH
- Postcode district: CA11
- Dialling code: 01768
- Police: Cumbria
- Fire: Cumbria
- Ambulance: North West
- UK Parliament: Penrith and Solway

Plumpton or Plumpton Wall is a small village and former civil parish, in the parish of Hesket, in the Westmorland and Furness district, in the traditional and historic county of Cumberland but now in the ceremonial county of Cumbria, England. It is about 4 miles (6 km) north of Penrith. In 1931 the parish had a population of 320.

== The village ==
The village is made up of the former separate hamlets of Salkeld Gate and Brockleymoor and consists mainly of houses along a minor road connecting the A6 to the B5305 near Skelton and also a few houses and farms along the A6 itself.

Close by are the settlements of Plumpton Head, Plumpton Foot and Plumpton Street.

The earthwork remains of a substantial Roman fort can be seen at Castlesteads Farm, alongside the A6 road just north of the village. The fort was known in antiquity as Voreda. The A6 follows the course of the Roman road from Carlisle to Brougham.

The village has an Anglican parish church by Robert Lorimer, dedicated to St John the Evangelist, a primary school, café and garden centre (the Pot Place), however the Post Office closed in 2016. During the daytimes on Mondays to Saturdays there is an hourly Stagecoach Cumbria & North Lancashire bus service to Penrith and Carlisle which has a reduced service in the evenings and on Sundays.

Plumpton railway station was opened by the Lancaster & Carlisle Railway on 17 December 1846. It lay on the West Coast Main Line but after ownership by the London & North Western Railway and the London Midland and Scottish Railway it was closed by British Railways on 31 May 1948 soon after nationalisation.

Plumpton is within the civil parish of Hesket but was from 1866 to 1 April 1934 a separate parish under the name of Plumpton Wall. Before that it was a chapelry or township of Lazonby parish.

The nearby areas of Plumpton Head, Plumpton Street and Plumpton Foot were not part of Plumpton parish but in Penrith or Hesket-in-the-Forest parishes.

== Murder ==
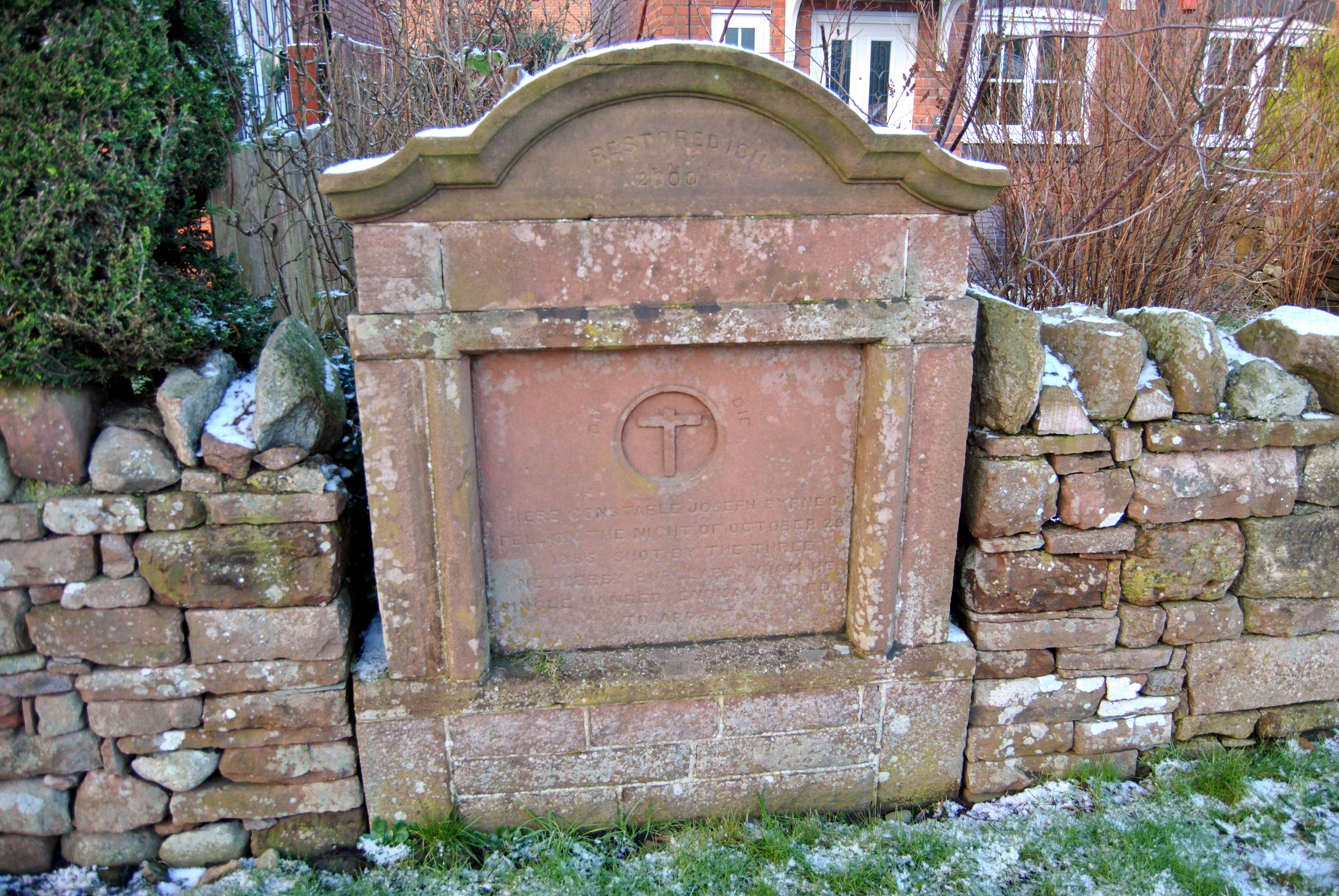
Memorial Stone for Joseph Byrnes

The murder of PC Joseph Byrnes (or Byrne) by the "Netherby" burglars was a notorious crime committed in Cumbria. On October 29, 1885 PC Byrnes was shot in the head by a gang, named the Netherby burglars by the memorial stone. The stone reads "Here constable Joseph Byrnes fell on the night of October 29, 1885, shot by the three Netherby burglars, whom he single handed endeavoured to arrest". The British Transport Police also have a report on the events.

== Transport ==
1 route serves the village run by Stagecoach. The 104 to Carlisle or to Penrith then Whinfell Forest Center Parcs.

== Presbyterian chapel ==
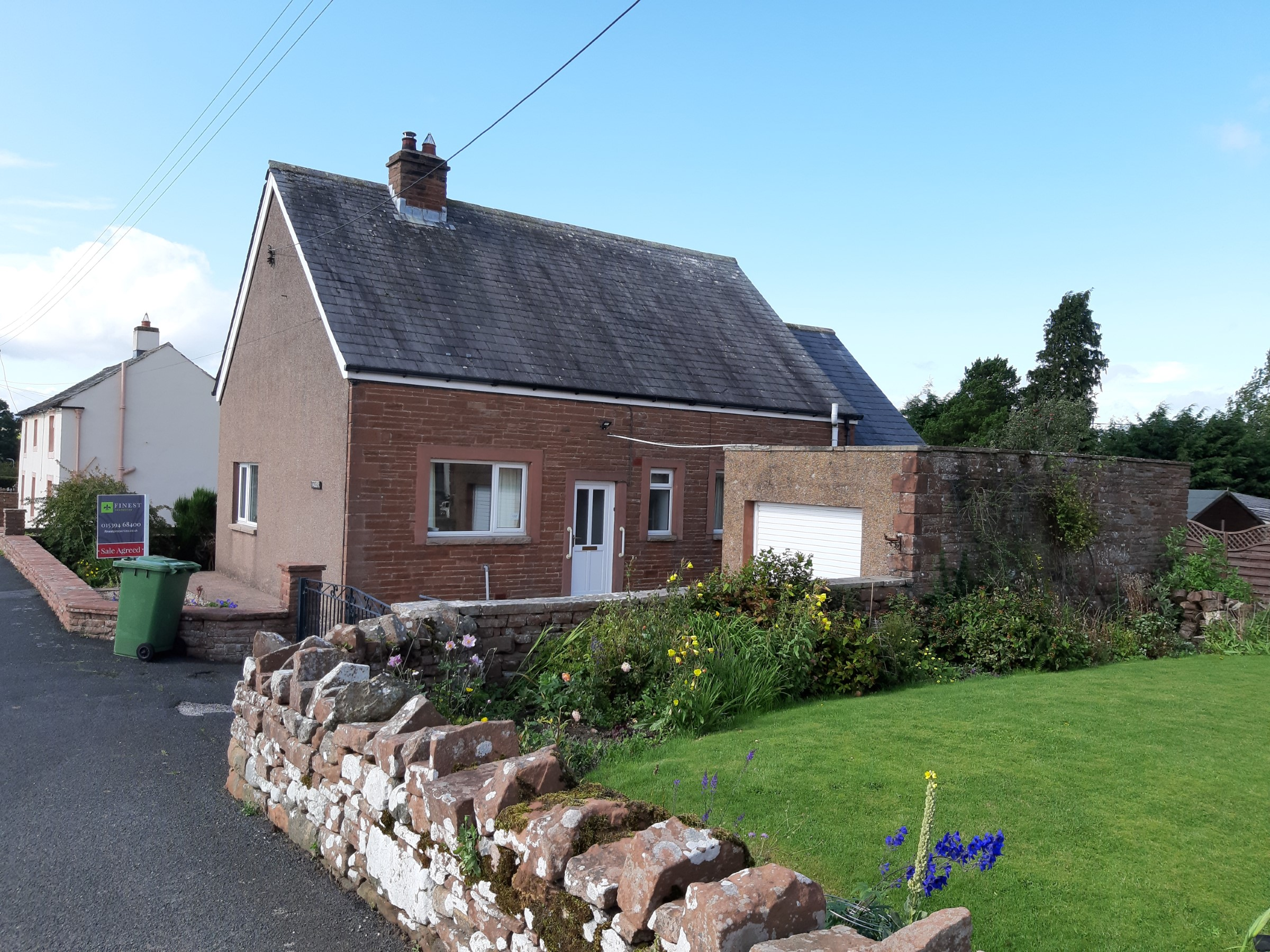
Plumpton Presbyterian Chapel

The Presbyterian chapel was built around 1850 era, though the exact date is unknown. The chancel on the back was thought to have been built later, however the internal construction suggests it is of the same era. It was acquired by the Wesleyans in 1887 and opened on 17 Aug 1888. It closed its doors as a chapel in 1952. In 1966 it was purchased and converted into a private residence.

== St. John the Evangelist parish church ==
The church is unusually modern for an older village, the sandstone date block reads 1907. It used to form part of the Penrith Team Ministry but is now a member of the Inglewood Group of Parishes. The church is set in a square wall with surrounding graveyard. Its stained glass windows were designed by Morris & Co.

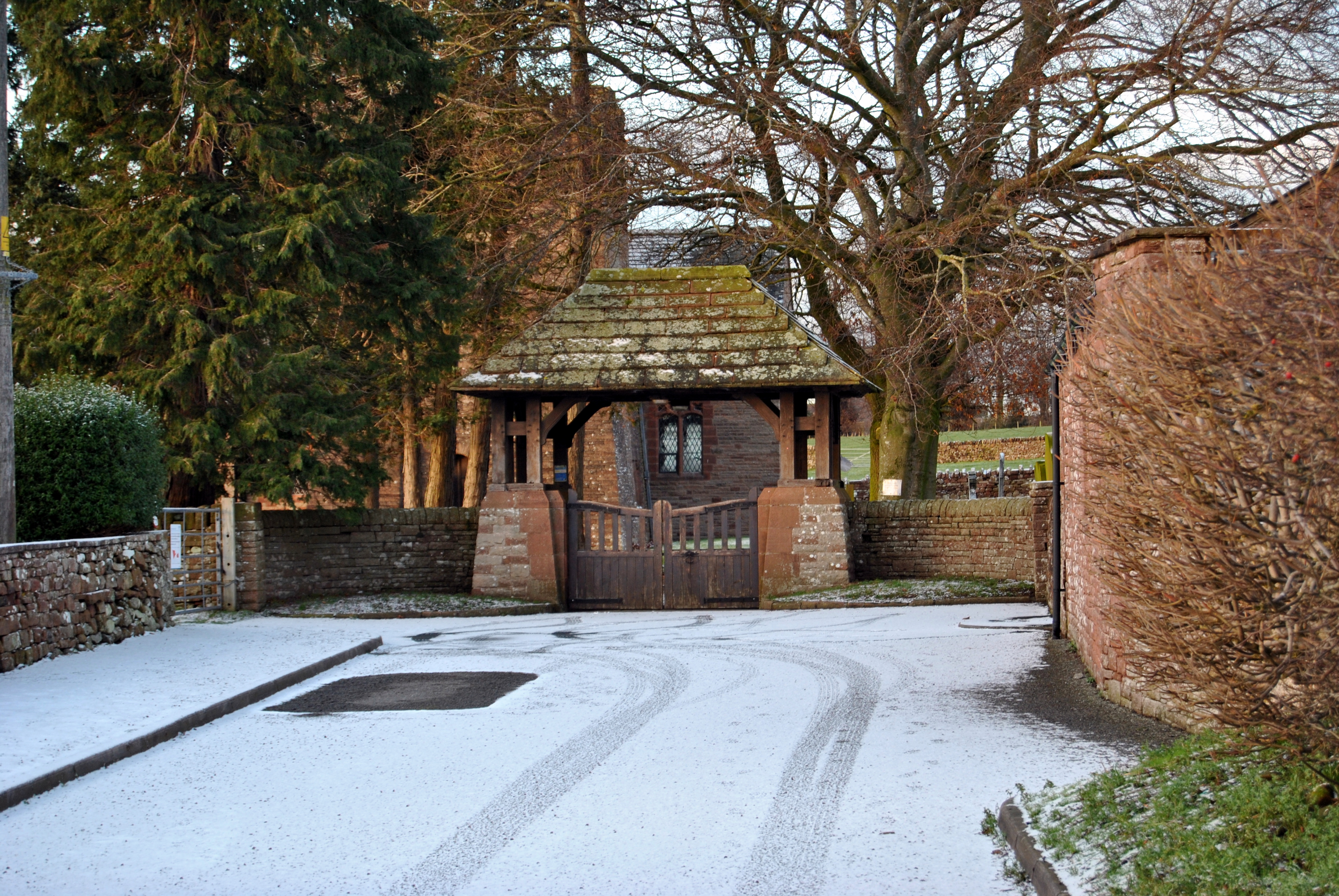

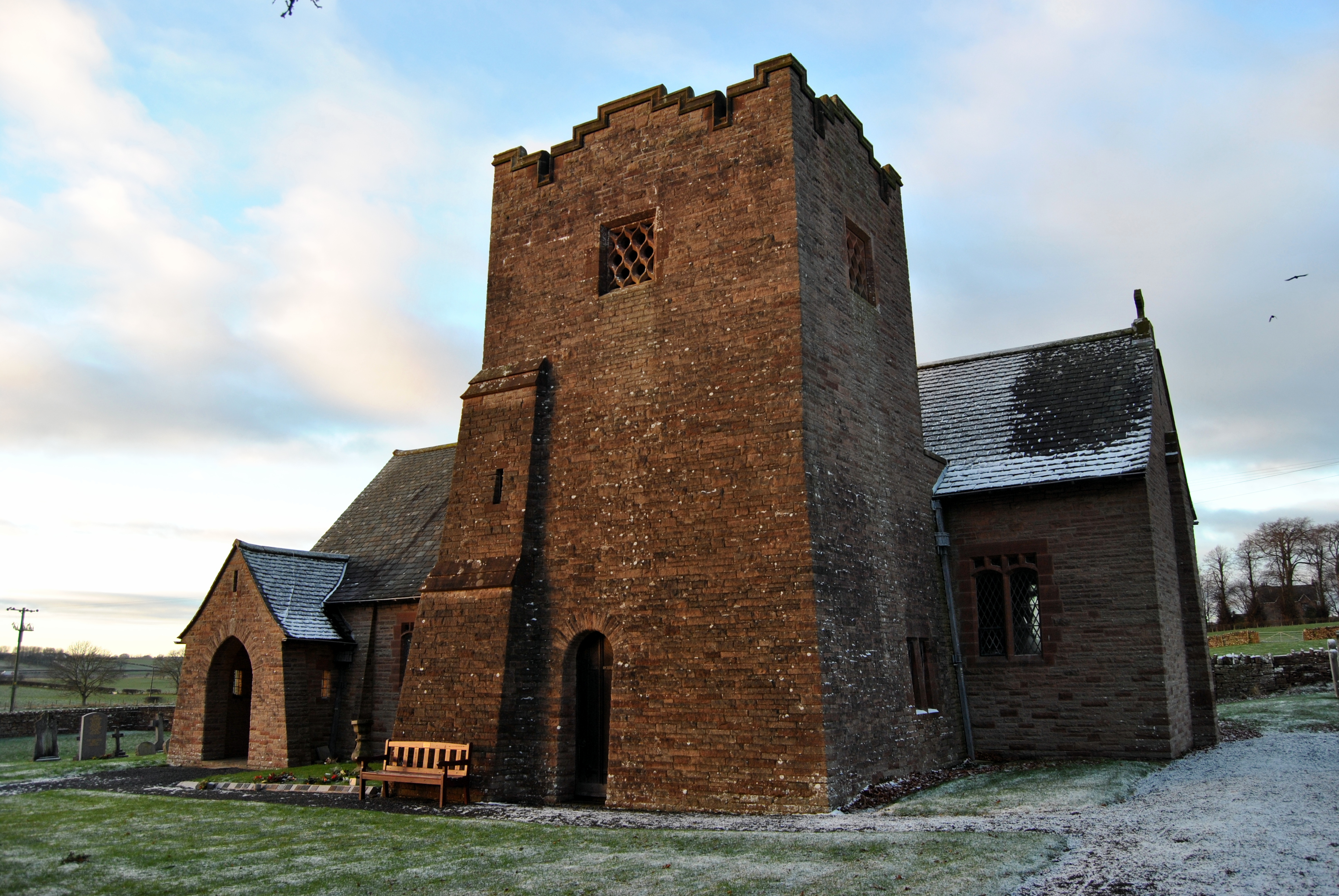

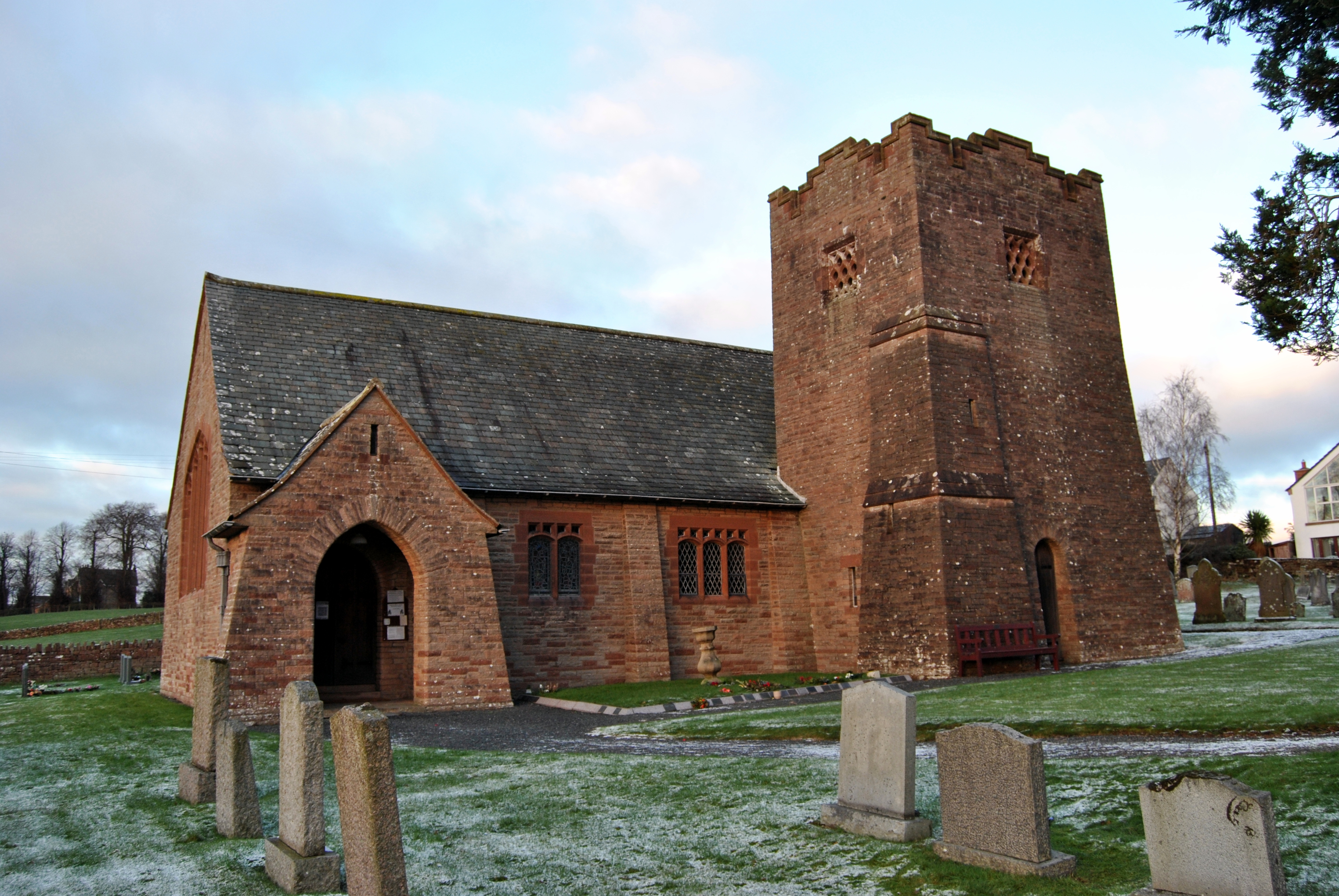

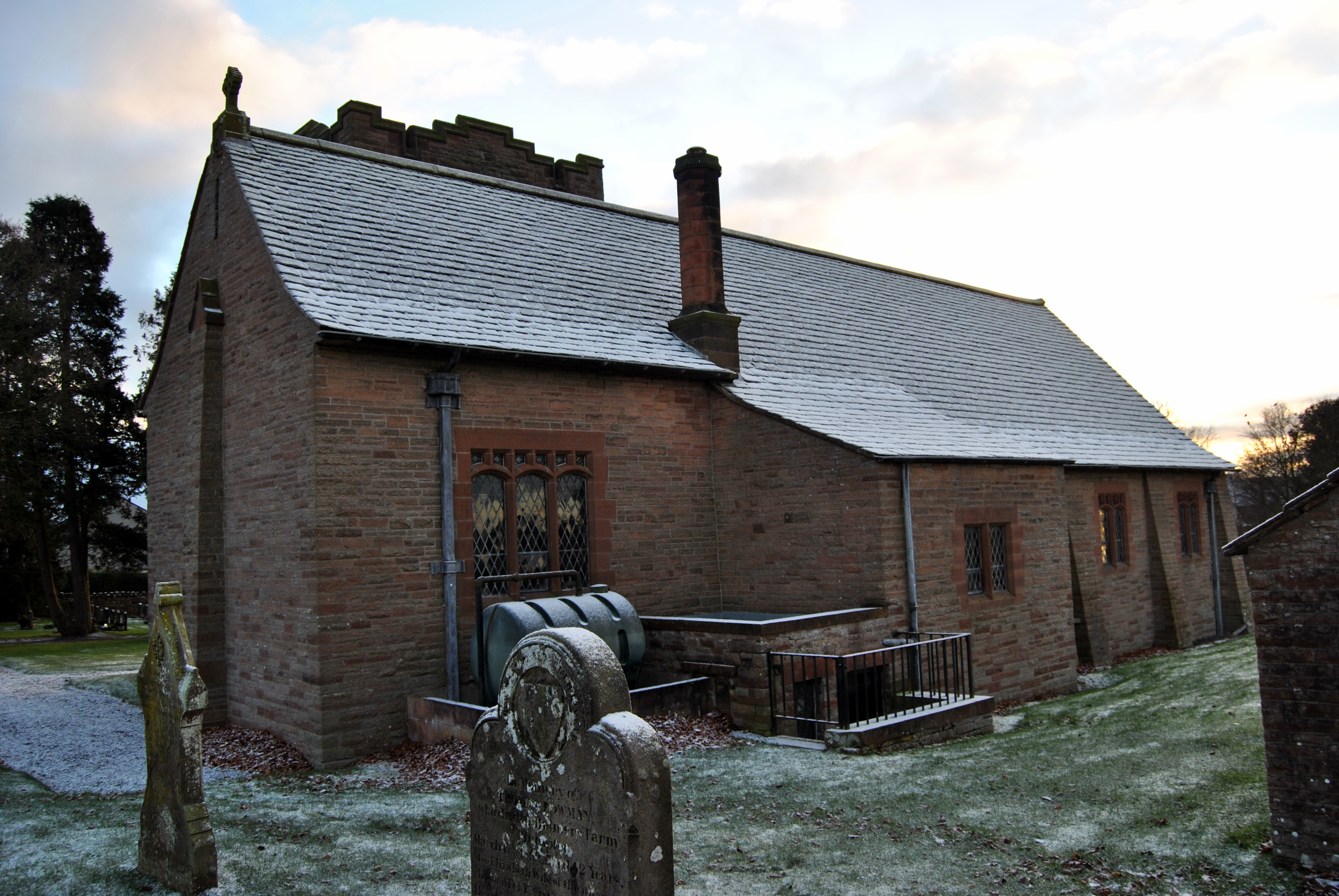

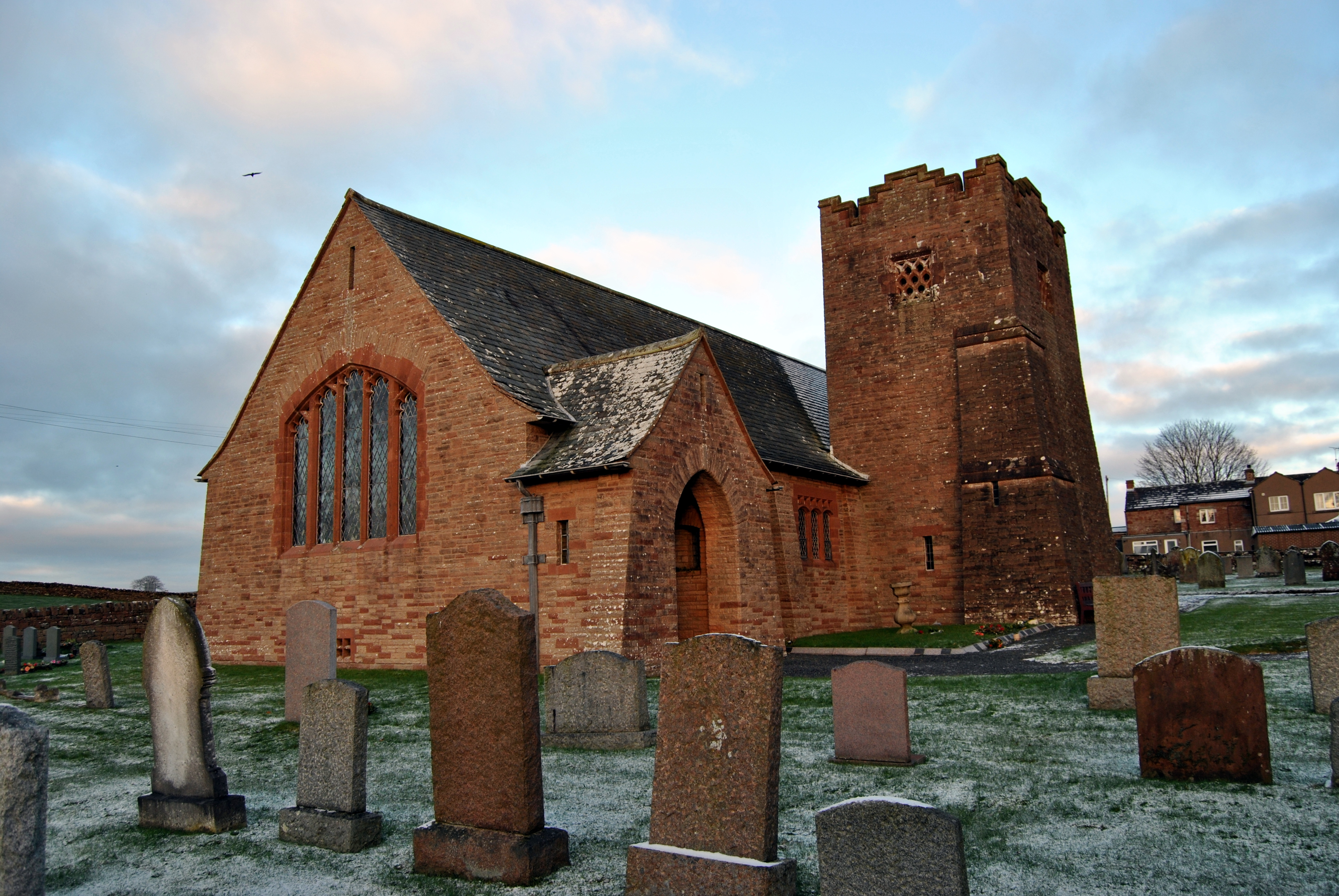

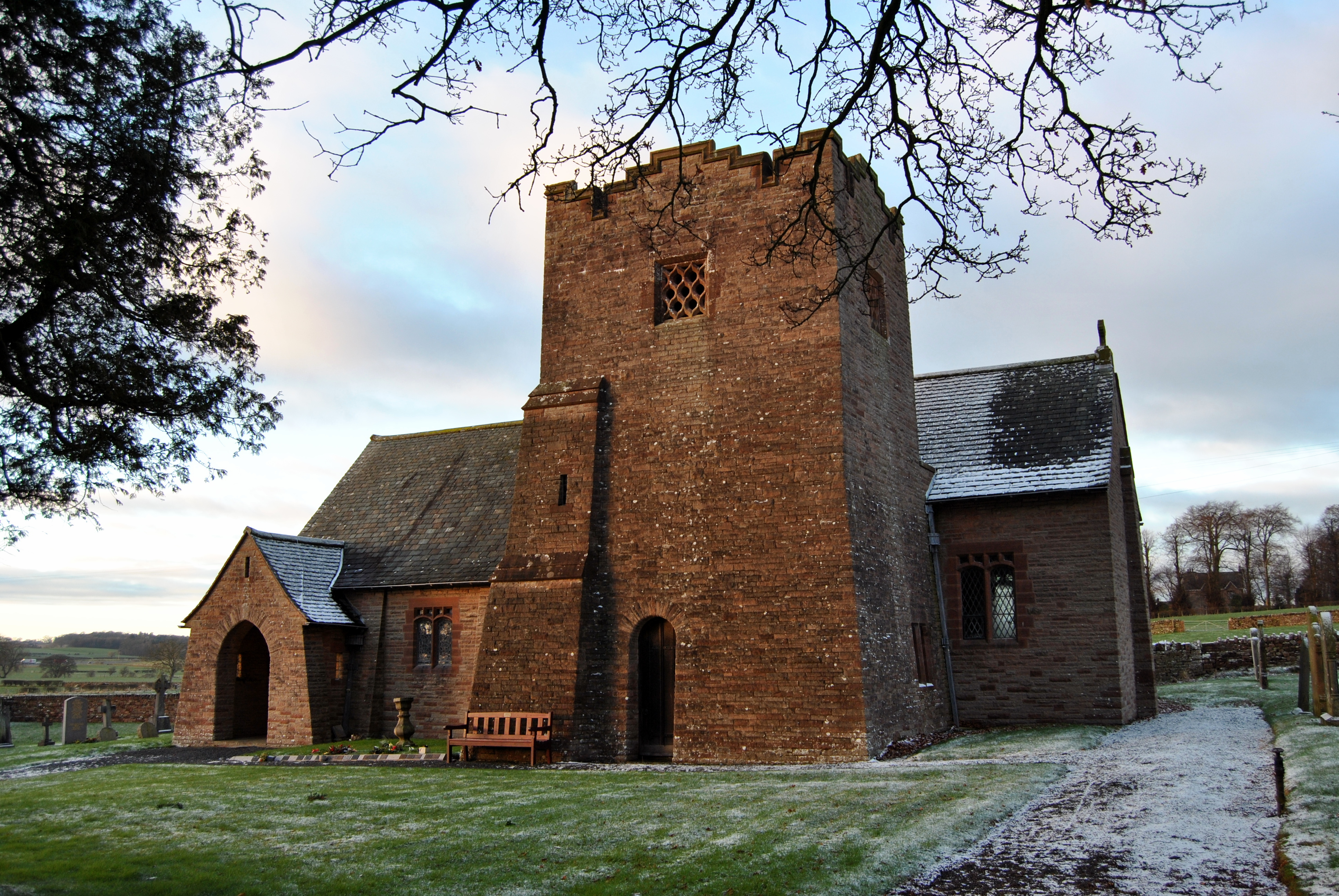

== See also ==
- Listed buildings in Hesket, Cumbria
