= Northern Gawain Group =

15th-century Arthurian romances

Northern Gawain Group is the name given by modern scholars to a group of Arthurian romances from around the fifteenth century, set around the northwestern English region of Cumbria, and in particular Inglewood Forest. The group includes The Wedding of Gawain and Dame Ragnell, The Turk and Gawain, The Awntyrs of Arthur, and by some reckonings The Carl of Carlisle. The hero of these texts is Sir Gawain.
