= Low Hesket =

Village in Cumbria, England

Coordinates: 54.808°N 2.833°W

- Location in the former district of Eden, Cumbria Location within Cumbria
- OS grid reference: NY465463
- Civil parish: Hesket
- Unitary authority: Westmorland and Furness
- Ceremonial county: Cumbria
- Region: North West
- Country: England
- Sovereign state: United Kingdom
- Post town: CARLISLE
- Postcode district: CA4
- Dialling code: 016974
- Police: Cumbria
- Fire: Cumbria
- Ambulance: North West
- UK Parliament: Penrith and Solway

Low Hesket is a village in the English county of Cumbria but was traditionally in the historic county of Cumberland.

Low Hesket is on the A6 road 8 1/2 miles (13.7 km) south of Carlisle. This is a former Roman road, and a milestone from that era has been discovered there inscribed IMP C FL VAL CONSTANTINO P F INV AVG, which expands to Imperator Caesar Flavius Valerius Constantinus Pius Felix Invictus Augustus, dating it from the time of emperor Constantine I, who ruled from 307 to 337.

== Governance ==
Low Hesket is in the parliamentary constituency of Penrith and Solway.

Administratively, Low Hesket forms part of the civil parish of Hesket, which, in turn, is part of the Westmorland and Furness unitary authority area.

== See also ==
- Listed buildings in Hesket, Cumbria
