= Ivegill =

Village in Cumbria, England

Coordinates: 54.780°N 2.906°W

- Village
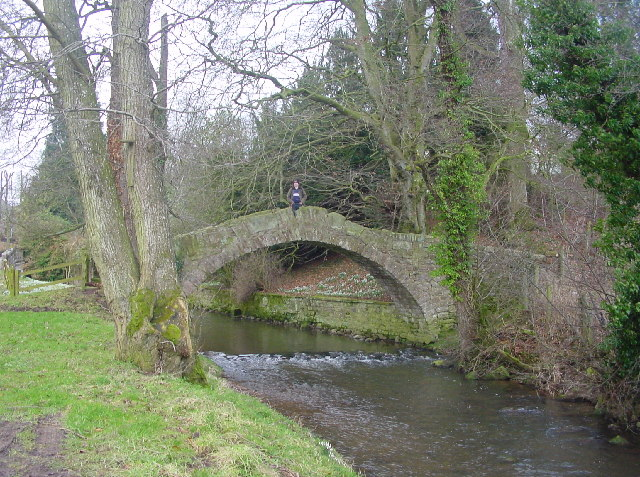
- Wharton Bridge, a grade II listed packhorse bridge over the Ive in Ivegill.

- Location in the former Eden District Location within Cumbria
- OS grid reference: NY418531
- Civil parish: Hesket
- Unitary authority: Westmorland and Furness
- Ceremonial county: Cumbria
- Region: North West
- Country: England
- Sovereign state: United Kingdom
- Post town: CARLISLE
- Postcode district: CA4
- Dialling code: 016974
- Police: Cumbria
- Fire: Cumbria
- Ambulance: North West
- UK Parliament: Penrith and Solway

Ivegill is a small village in Cumbria, England, formerly in the historic county of Cumberland. The village has one place of worship and a school. It is located on an unclassified road near Southwaite services which is on the M6 motorway. It takes its name from the River Ive which flows through the centre of the village. Nearby settlements include the villages of Southwaite, Low Braithwaite, Middlesceugh and Highbridge.

== See also ==
- Listed buildings in Skelton, Cumbria
