= High Hesket =

Village in Cumbria, England

Coordinates: 54.791°N 2.818°W

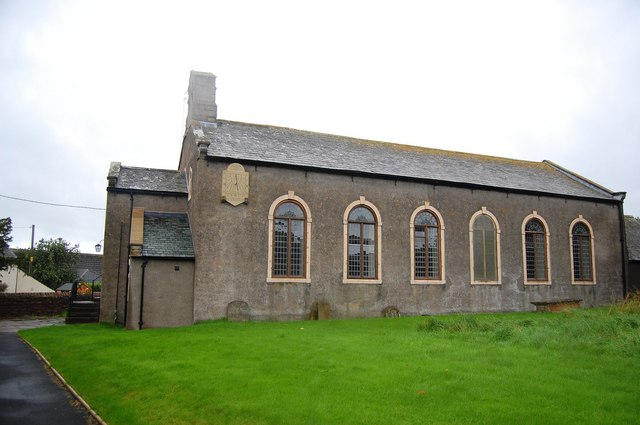
- High Hesket Parish Church, St Mary the Virgin

- Location in the former district of Eden, Cumbria Location within Cumbria
- OS grid reference: NY474443
- Civil parish: Hesket
- Unitary authority: Westmorland and Furness
- Ceremonial county: Cumbria
- Region: North West
- Country: England
- Sovereign state: United Kingdom
- Post town: CARLISLE
- Postcode district: CA4
- Dialling code: 016974
- Police: Cumbria
- Fire: Cumbria
- Ambulance: North West
- UK Parliament: Penrith and Solway

High Hesket is a village near the A6 road, in the civil parish of Hesket, in the Westmorland and Furness district, but traditionally in the historic county of Cumberland and now in the ceremonial county of Cumbria, England. The village was on the A6 road until it was by-passed.

== Amenities ==
High Hesket has a place of worship and a school.

== Transport ==
1 route serves the village run by Stagecoach. The 104 to Carlisle or to Penrith then Whinfell Forest Center Parcs.

== See also ==
- Listed buildings in Hesket, Cumbria
- Tarn Wadling
