= Calthwaite =

Village in Cumbria, England

Coordinates: 54.754°N 2.828°W

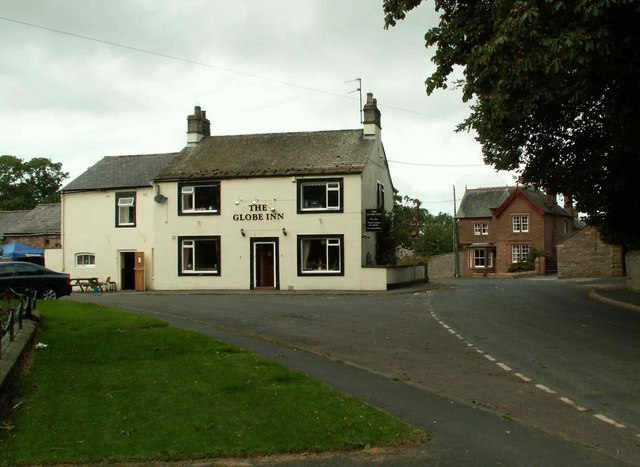
- The Globe Inn public house, Calthwaite

- Location within Cumbria
- OS grid reference: NY467402
- Civil parish: Hesket
- Unitary authority: Westmorland and Furness
- Ceremonial county: Cumbria
- Region: North West
- Country: England
- Sovereign state: United Kingdom
- Post town: PENRITH
- Postcode district: CA11
- Dialling code: 01768
- Police: Cumbria
- Fire: Cumbria
- Ambulance: North West
- UK Parliament: Penrith and Solway

Calthwaite is a small village in rural Cumbria, England, situated between the small market town of Penrith and the larger city of Carlisle. It is within of the civil parish of Hesket and the unitary authority of Westmorland and Furness, but historically part of the traditional county of Cumberland. It has a population of around 100 people. In 1870-72 the township had a population of 269 and a railway station.

The village contains a primary school, a Church of England Church, a pre-school nursery and a pub called the Globe Inn.

The school has around 68 pupils, and 3 teachers. There are three classes, Class 1 consisting of reception and year 1, Class 2 consisting of Year 2 & Year 3 and Class 3 which is years 4-6. The Head Teacher is Mr. Harvey.

Calthwaite Hall dates back to 1837 and has been run as a holiday and wedding venue.

Two miles south-east of the village, Brackenburgh Old Tower is a late 14th or early 15th century pele tower adjoining a large 19th-century house at Brackenburgh Hall.

== See also ==
- Listed buildings in Hesket, Cumbria
