= Calthwaite Hall =

Historic house in Cumbria, England

Coordinates: 54°45′16″N 2°49′33″W

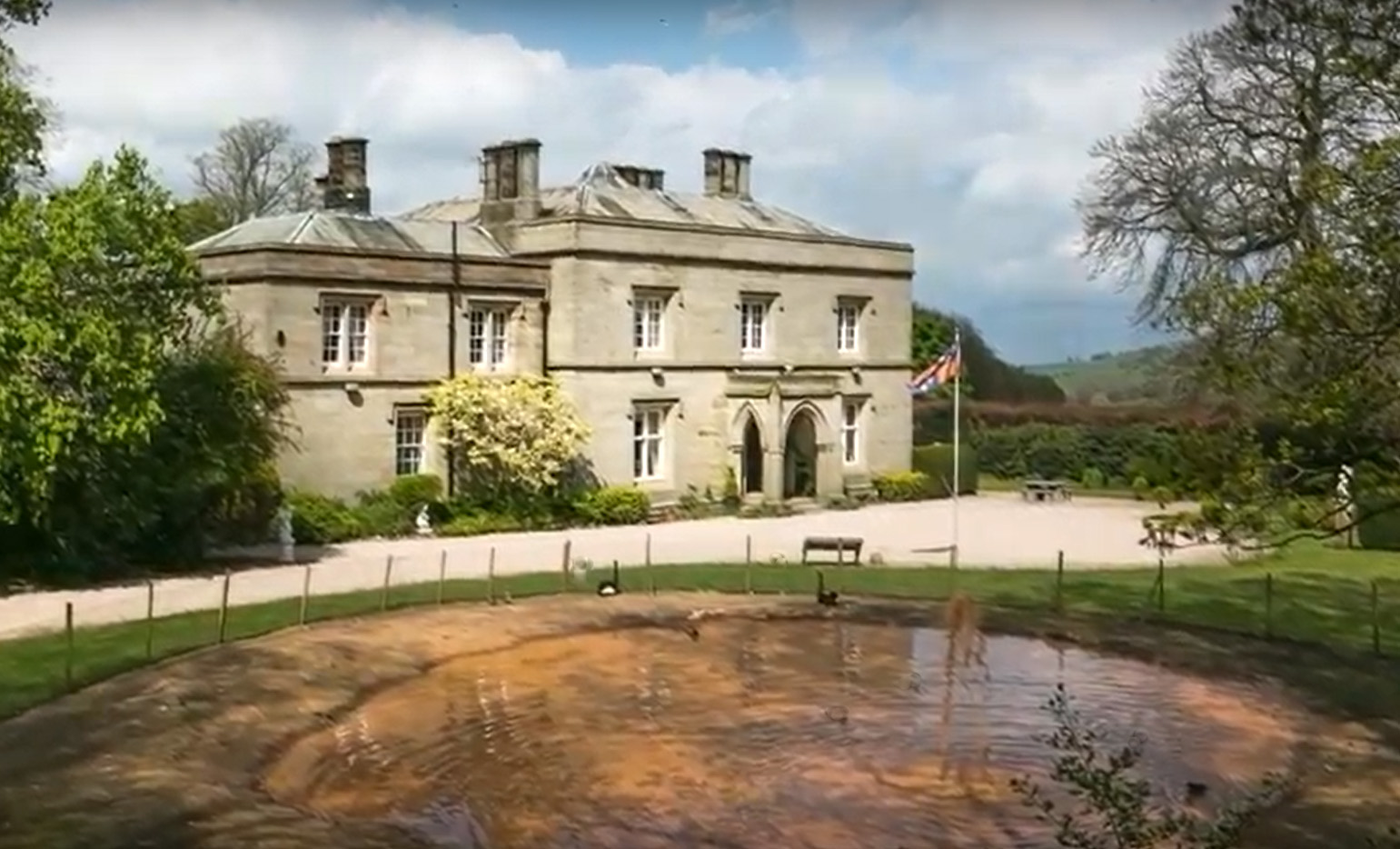
Calthwaite Hall

Calthwaite Hall, near Penrith in Cumbria, England, is a house of historical significance and is Grade II listed on the National Heritage List for England. It was built in 1837 for Thomas Dixon Esq and was the home of many notable people for the next 150 years. It is now a venue for weddings and other special events and also provides accommodation.

== Early residents ==
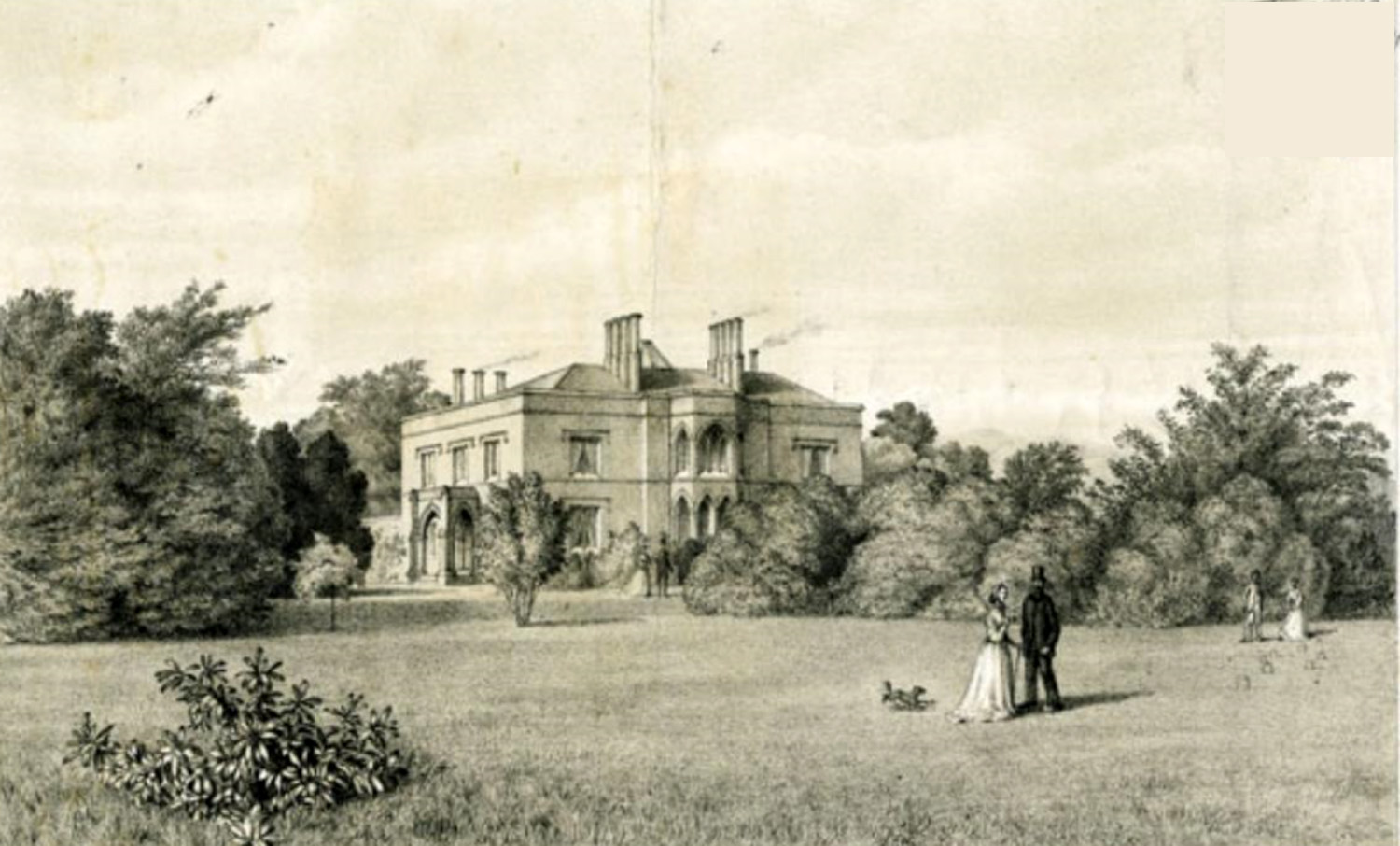
Engraving of Calthwaite Hall circa 1840

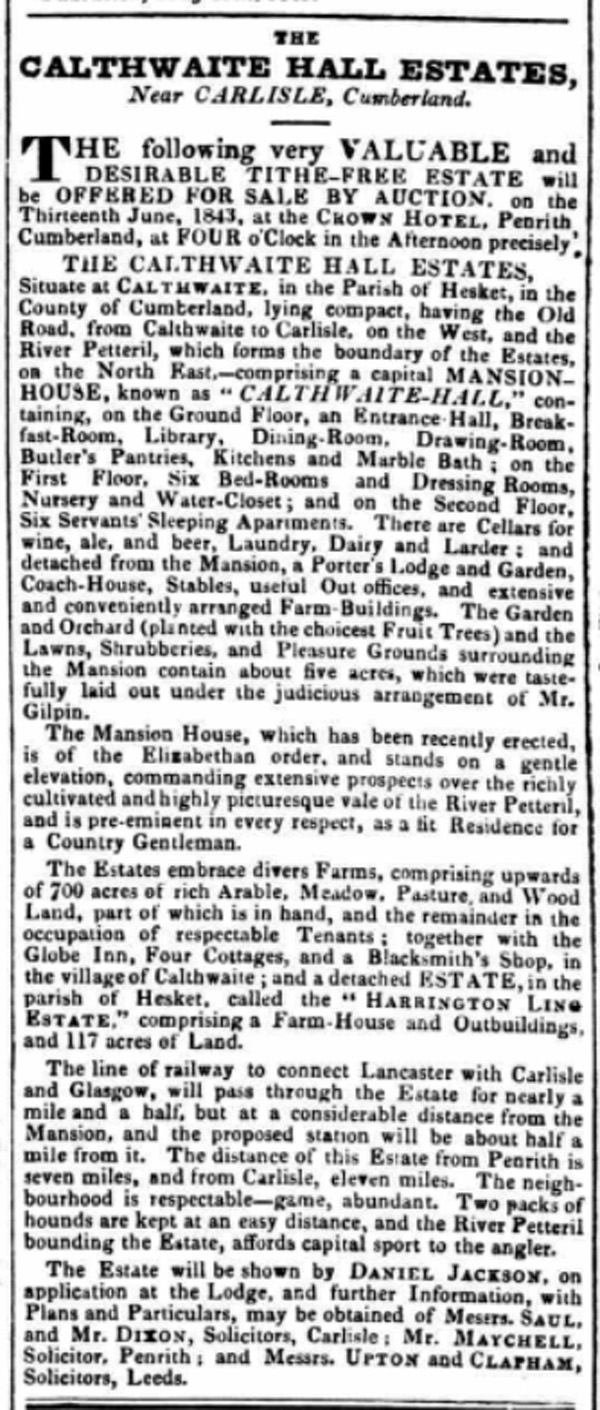
Sale ad 1843

Thomas Dixon (1799–1846) built Calthwaite Hall in 1837. His father, also called Thomas Dixon, had bought the Calthwaite estate in 1791 from the Duke of Devonshire. It seems that there was a house here at this time which was altered by Thomas's father, as a book written in 1811 refers to "Calthwaite Hall, the improved mansion of Thomas Dixon".

Thomas was a solicitor who had a business in Carlisle. In 1830 he married Mary Jane Parker, who was the daughter of Christopher Parker, a wealthy landowner who owned Petteril Green. When he built the new Calthwaite Hall in 1837, he employed the famous landscaper William Sawrey Gilpin to lay out the gardens. A description of the property was contained in a directory of 1847. It stated:

Calthwaite Hall occupies a beautiful situation, contiguous to the village, commanding an extensive view of the fells and surrounding country, and was built about ten years ago by the late Thomas Dixon, Esq. It is in the Elizabethan style of architecture, with a Gothic porch in the south front, and a corresponding Gothic centre in the east front. The entrance hall is exceedingly pretty, and the stair case, pillars, etc are very elegantly carved. The whole building is of cut stone.

Thomas sold the hall in 1843. It was bought by William Hammond Ambler from Bishop Auckland. He sold it in 1848.

It was in the occupation of a series of tenants until the 1880s, when it was bought by Joseph Harris.

== Later residents ==
Joseph Harris (1859–1946) bought Calthwaite Hall in about 1885. He is shown in the 1891 Census living there with some of his family and a butler, cook, maid, two housemaids and a kitchen maid. He was born in 1859 in Greysouthen, Cumbria. He was part of a wealthy family who were long established land and colliery owners in this area. He went to school at Aldin House, Slough. In 1895 he was the High Sheriff of Cumberland.

Viscount Morpeth

He married Hope Knowles (1873–1947) in 1896, and the couple had three children. In 1901 he commissioned the famous architect Sir Robert Lorimer to build Brackenburgh. The 1901 Census lists Lorimer as a visitor at Calthwaite Hall. Brackenburgh was completed in about 1903, and the family moved there and rented Calthwaite Hall to various tenants. One of the first was Viscount Morpeth.

Viscount Morpeth, whose full name was Charles James Stanley Howard and later became the 10th Earl of Carlisle (1867–1912), rented Calthwaite Hall in about 1905 as his country residence. Charles was born in 1867 in London. His father, George James Howard, owned Castle Howard and Naworth Castle. He went to Oxford University and obtained a BA in 1889. In 1894 he married Rhoda L’Estrange, and the couple had four children. He fought in the Boer War and was a member of Parliament. He inherited his father's title in 1911.

After the Howard family left, Hubert Lawrence (1859–1939) was the tenant for many years. He was a wealthy East India merchant who married late in life at the age of 53. He was interested in sporting and social activities. He lived at Calthwaite Hall with his wife Mary until his death in 1939.

In about 1950 the Pattinsons became residents of Calthwaite Hall, remaining there for many years until recently, when it became wedding venue and accommodation facility.
