= Hesket, Cumbria =

Civil parish in Cumbria, England

Coordinates: 54.77°N 2.80°W

Hesket
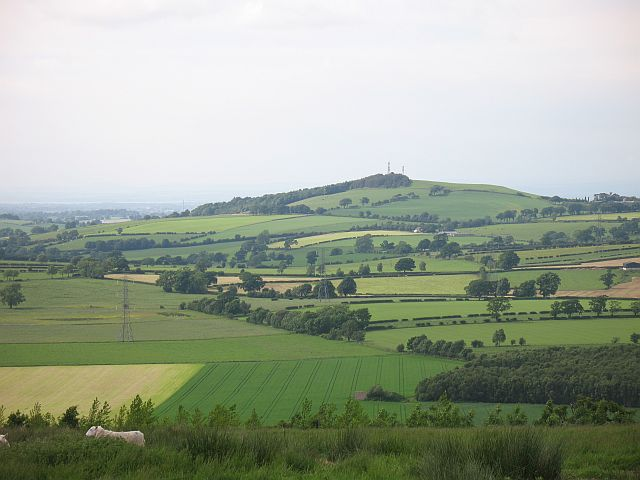
- View over Barrock Fell, in Hesket Parish

- Location within Cumbria
- Population: 2,796 (Parish, 2021)
- OS grid reference: NY4744
- Civil parish: Hesket
- Unitary authority: Westmorland and Furness
- Ceremonial county: Cumbria
- Region: North West
- Country: England
- Sovereign state: United Kingdom
- Post town: CARLISLE
- Postcode district: CA4, CA11
- Dialling code: 01697
- Police: Cumbria
- Fire: Cumbria
- Ambulance: North West
- UK Parliament: Penrith and Solway

Hesket (also Hesket-in-the-Forest) is a large civil parish in the Westmorland and Furness unitary district of Cumbria, England, on the main A6 between Carlisle and Penrith. Hesket is part of the historic royal hunting ground of Inglewood Forest. Settlement in the parish dates back to the Roman occupation.

== Extent ==
The parish is located between the city of Carlisle and the market town of Penrith, along nine miles of the A6. The parish encompasses the villages of Armathwaite, Calthwaite, High Hesket, Low Hesket, Plumpton and Southwaite, as well as the hamlets of Aiketgate, Morton, Old Town, Thiefside, Petteril Green and Plumpton Foot. It also includes parts of the villages of Ivegill and Wreay, with these villages also part of the parishes of Skelton and St Cuthbert Without respectively.

The River Petteril runs north through the parish on its way to Carlisle. The River Eden forms part of its eastern boundary near Armathwaite.

== History ==
At Castlesteads or Old Penrith just north of Plumpton village are the remains of a Roman Fort known as Voreda. Just north of the site, aerial evidence has located two Roman camps, with limited excavation work in 1977 revealing pottery dating from AD 120. The structures are located near to the main Roman Road connecting the Vale of York to Carlisle, which now forms part of the modern-day A6.

Many of the villages in the parish have names with Norse origins, several with the common suffix of 'thwaite', from the Norse clearing or meadow. The name Hesket itself derives from the old Norse for horse ('hestr') and road or race course ('skeid'). In 1822, a Viking cairn was discovered in the parish, along the route of the A6, near the modern location of Court Thorn GP Surgery, during operations to widen the road. The objects uncovered were placed in the collection at Tullie House Museum in Carlisle.

The parish is part of the Royal hunting ground known as Inglewood Forest, established by William the Conqueror and extended by Henry II.

In 1870, during construction of the Settle to Carlisle railway, a dispute broke out between the groups of Scottish, English and Irish navvies employed by the Midland Railway to construct the line. Confrontations at a local public house outside the village of Armathwaite led to the murder of an Irishman named Cornelius Cox, with other navvies sustaining significant injuries. The following day, two mobs of English navvies formed to drive the Irish workers from the project - one was intercepted by a large contingent from Cumbria Constabulary, whilst the other successfully attacked the Irish encampment. Three men were subsequently arrested for the murder of Cox, and a further three men as ringleaders of the disorder.

In 1885, Police Constable Joseph Byrnes was shot and killed by three assailants in Plumpton. The trio were wanted in connection with a burglary at Netherby Hall. The men were later caught and sentenced to death by hanging. A memorial to Constable Byrnes was erected in the village and is now Grade II listed.

== Governance ==
There are two tiers of local government covering Hesket, at parish and unitary authority level: Hesket Parish Council and Westmorland and Furness Council. The parish is divided into three wards, Armathwaite, Calthwaite and Southwaite, each electing five parish councillors.

Hesket is in the United Kingdom parliamentary constituency of Penrith and Solway.

=== Administrative history ===
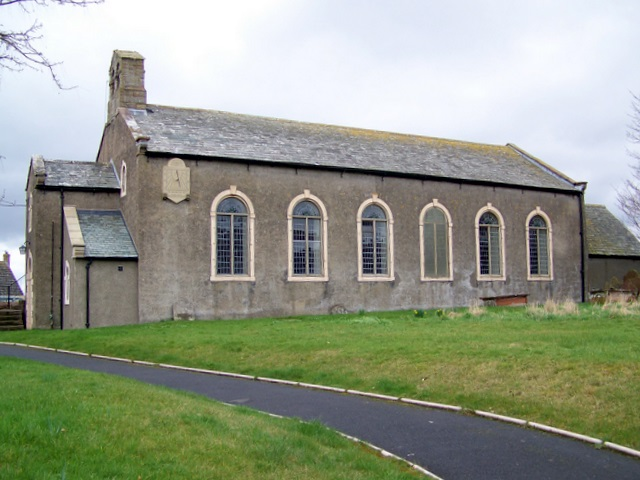
St Mary's Church, High Hesket

Hesket in the Forest was an ancient parish within the historic county of Cumberland. The parish was subdivided into six townships: Calthwaite, Iton Field, Nether and Upper Hesket, Petterill Crooks, Plumpton Street, and part of Middlesceugh and Braithwaite (the rest of the latter township was in the parish of Carlisle St Mary). The parish church of St Mary was at High Hesket in the Nether and Upper Hesket township; the church was rebuilt in the early 18th century, but retains some fragments of the medieval building.

From the 17th century onwards, parishes were gradually given various civil functions under the poor laws, in addition to their original ecclesiastical functions. In some cases, the civil functions were exercised by subdivisions of the parish rather than the parish as a whole. The township of Middlesceugh and Braithwaite took on its own poor law functions, and the other five townships were administered together. In 1866, the legal definition of 'parish' was changed to be the areas used for administering the poor laws, and so Middlesceugh and Braithwaite became a separate civil parish from Hesket in the Forest.

The parish was given a parish council under the Local Government Act 1894. In 1934, the parish was enlarged to take in the area of the abolished civil parish of Plumpton Wall (which had historically been a township in the parish of Lazonby). As part of the 1934 expansion, the name of the parish was changed from 'Hesket in the Forest' to just 'Hesket'. In 1974, the parish became part of the Eden District in the new county of Cumbria. Eden was in turn abolished in 2023 when the new Westmorland and Furness Council was created, also taking over the functions of the abolished Cumbria County Council in the area.

== Demography ==
The population of the parish was 2,796 at the 2021 census. At the 2001 census the population was 2,363, increasing to 2,588 at the 2011 census.

== Transport ==
The Settle-Carlisle Railway, which opened in 1876, runs through the parish with a station at Armathwaite. Next to it is a Victorian signal box maintained by local volunteers and open for viewing. The West Coast Main Line also runs through the parish. At one time there were stations on the line at Plumpton, which closed in 1948, and Southwaite and Calthwaite, both of which closed in 1952.

The M6 motorway and the A6 road run parallel to each other through the parish with a motorway service area at Southwaite. The 104 bus service also runs through the villages of Plumpton, Low Hesket and High Hesket, operated by Stagecoach between Carlisle and Penrith. There is a community bus service, Fellrunner, which provides return journeys to Carlisle and Penrith from various stops in the parish. The service was established in 1979, spearheaded by a local clergyman, the Reverend Phillip Canham, and is run entirely by volunteers.

== Amenities ==
The parish has five primary schools, in the villages of Armathwaite, Calthwaite, High Hesket, Ivegill and Plumpton. There are three village halls, in the villages of Low Hesket, Ivegill and Armathwaite, run by volunteers, and a community centre housed in a former Methodist chapel between the villages of Calthwaite and Plumpton. The villages of Armathwaite, Calthwaite, High Hesket, Ivegill and Plumpton all have parish churches.

Armathwaite village has a village shop and post office, two public houses and a children's play area. Calthwaite has a public house, a children's play area and a youth football club. Low Hesket also has a public house. The primary school playground in Plumpton doubles as a children's play area out of school hours. The village has a garden centre and cafe at the former station yard.

== Places of interest ==
The parish contains sixty-six listed buildings, including three Grade II* listed: Armathwaite Castle, now a private residence, the Church of St Mary's in High Hesket, dating from the 18th century but incorporating parts of the medieval church building, and the 16th-century Southwaite Hall Copper House and barns. It also contains the Grade II listed Katharine Well at Mellguards, just outside the village of Southwaite, built as a memorial to the sister of the local architect and philanthropist Sara Losh.

== Gallery ==
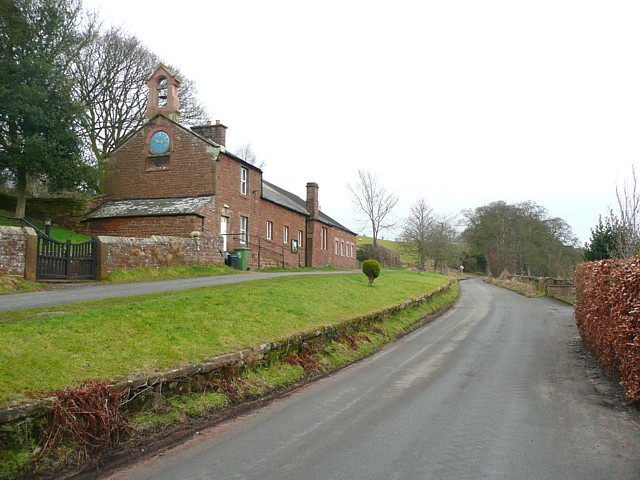
The Old School Hall, Armathwaite, now a village hall

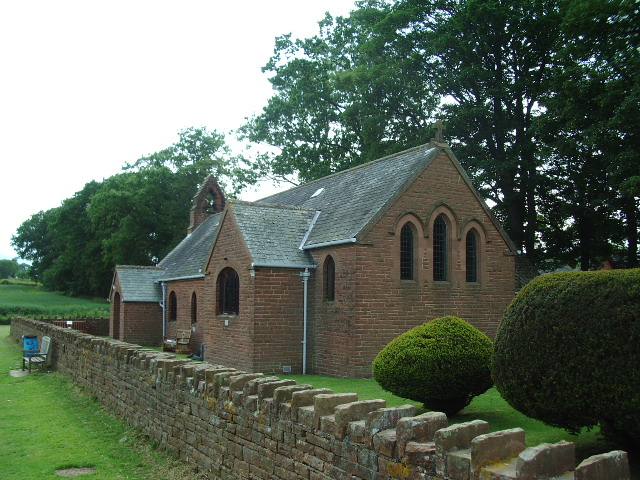
All Saints Church, Calthwaite

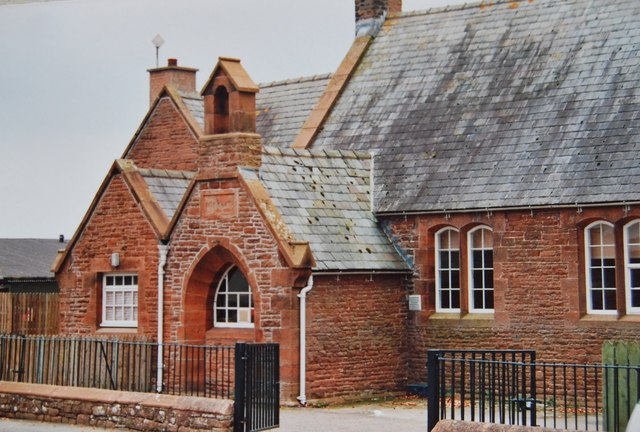
High Hesket Church of England Primary School

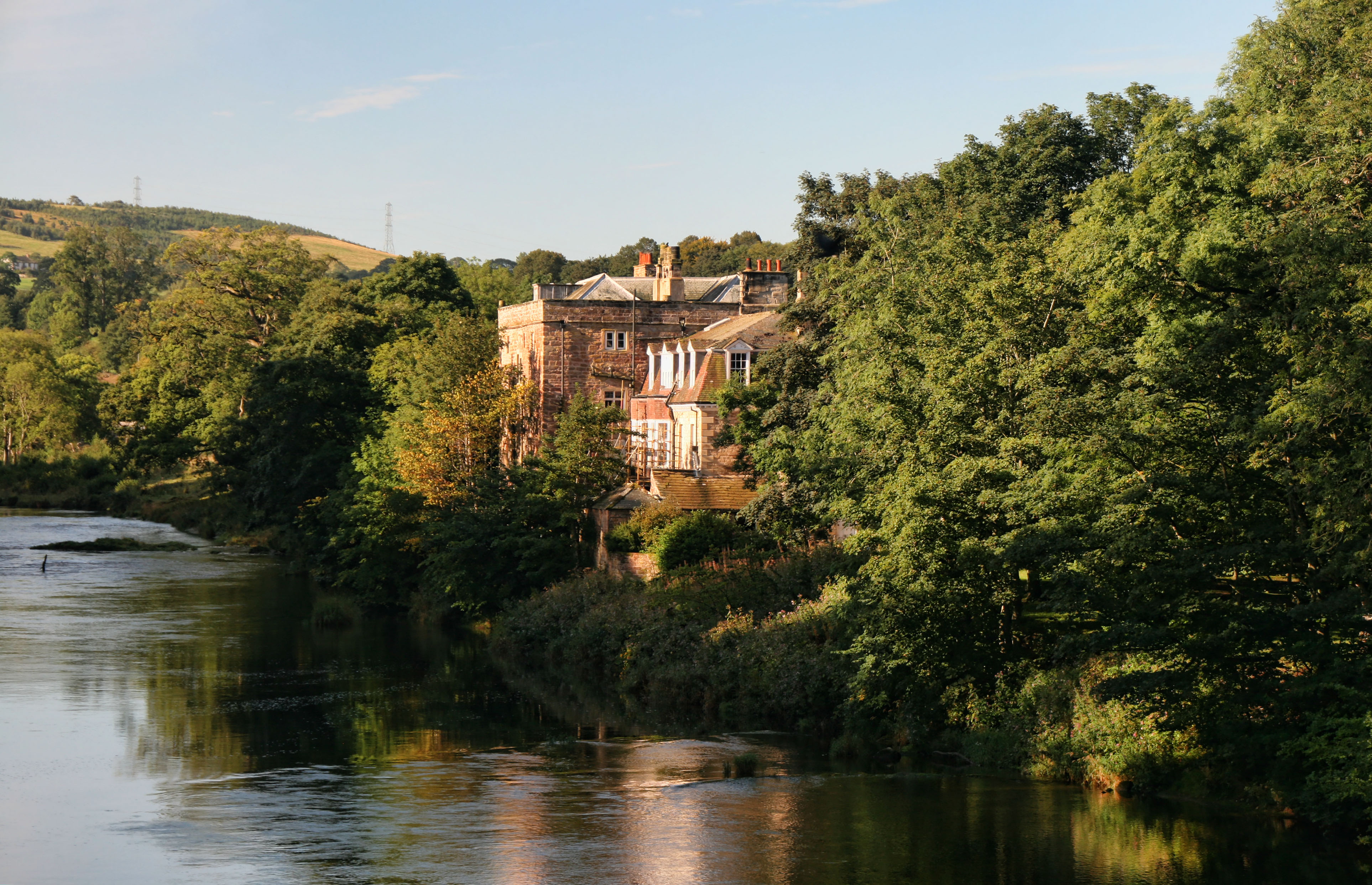
Grade II* listed Armathwaite Castle, now a private residence

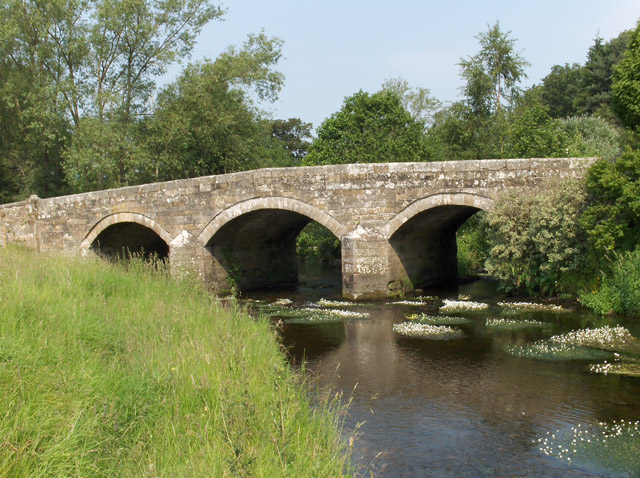
Crook's Bridge, over the River Petteril

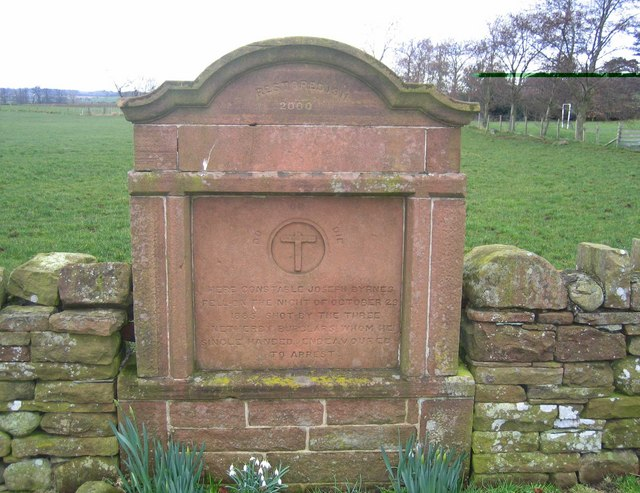
Byrnes Monument, Plumpton

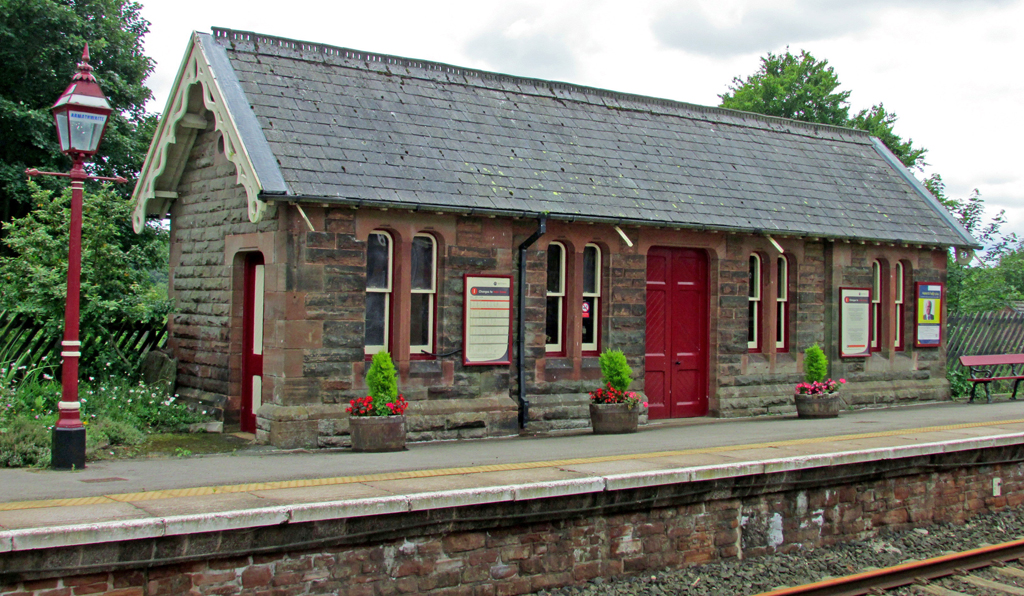
Waiting room on the southbound side at Armathwaite Station

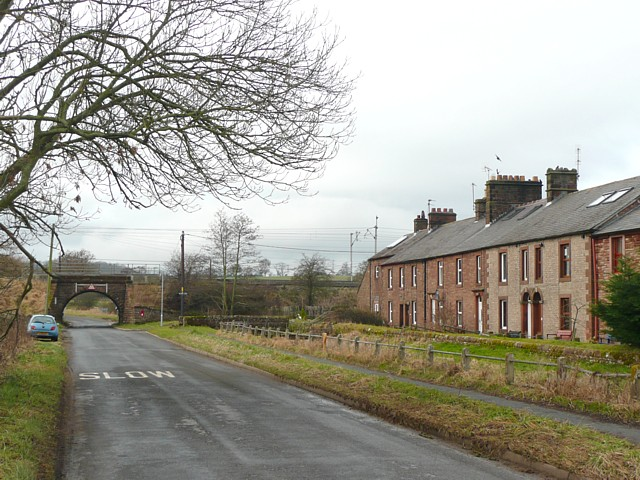
Cottages, Plumpton Village

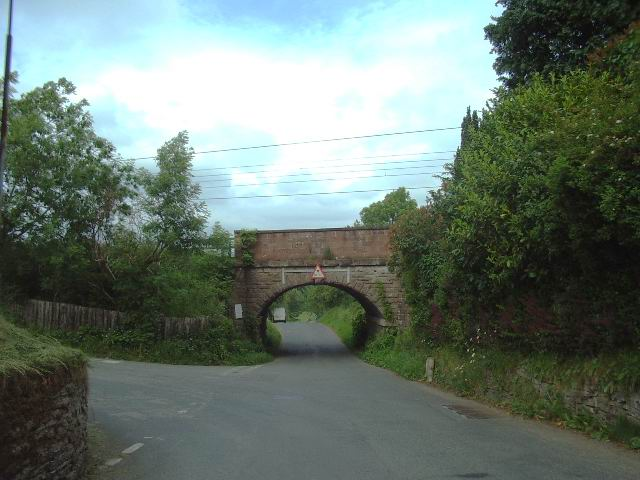
Railway Bridge, Southwaite

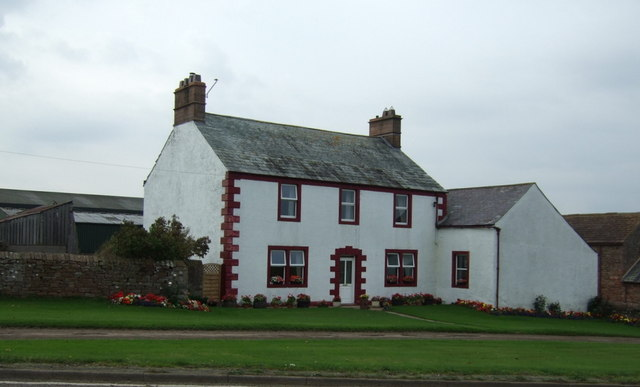
Bull's Head Farmhouse, Grade II listed building near Plumpton Foot.

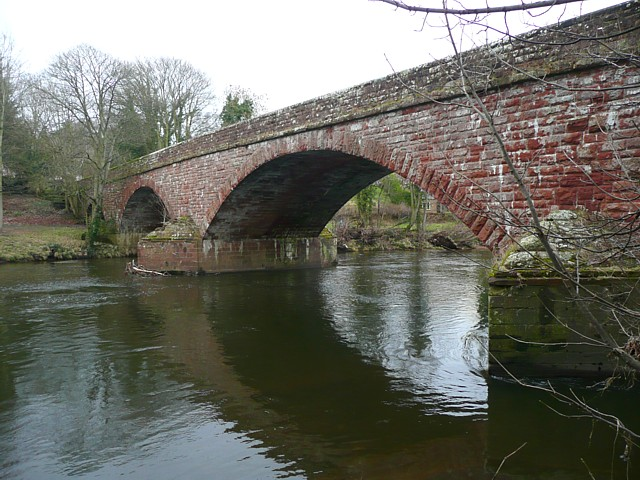
Armathwaite Bridge, which spans the River Eden

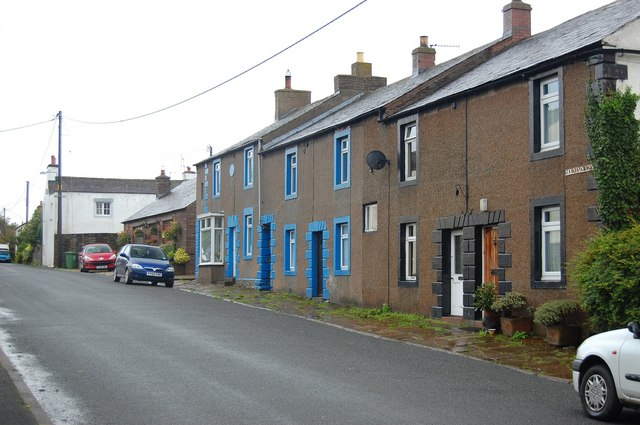
Cottages, High Hesket Village

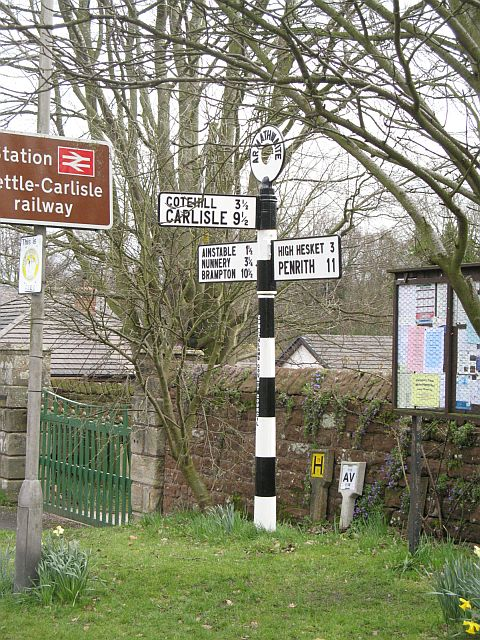
Traditional Cumberland signpost in Armathwaite village

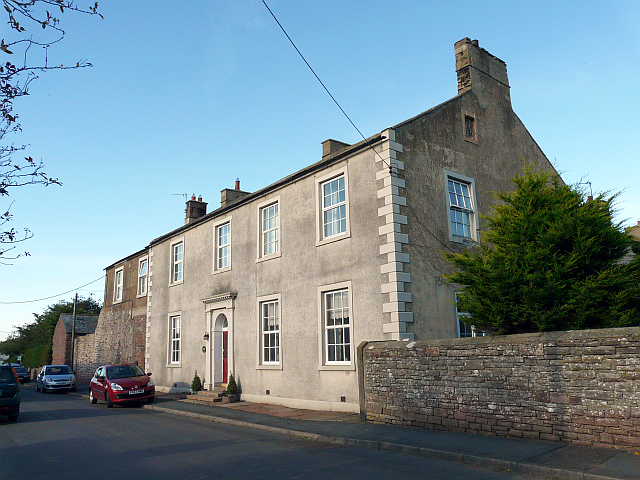
Hesket House, Grade II listed building in High Hesket village

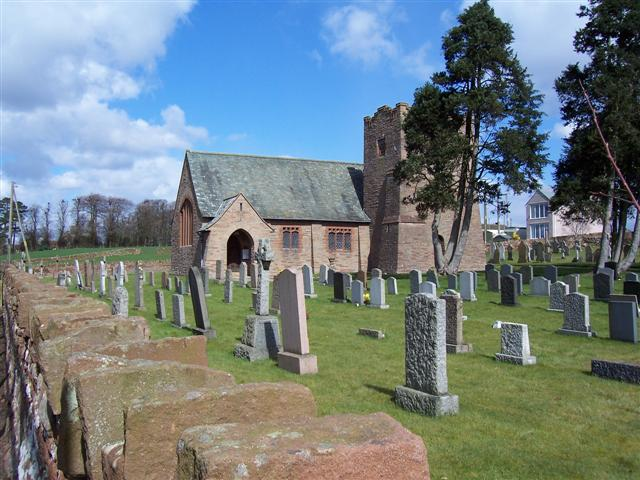
St John the Evangelist Church, Plumpton

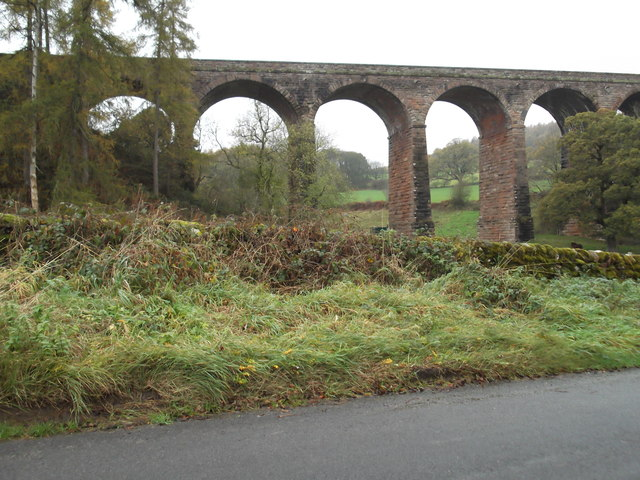
Drybeck Viaduct, part of the Settle-Carlisle Railway

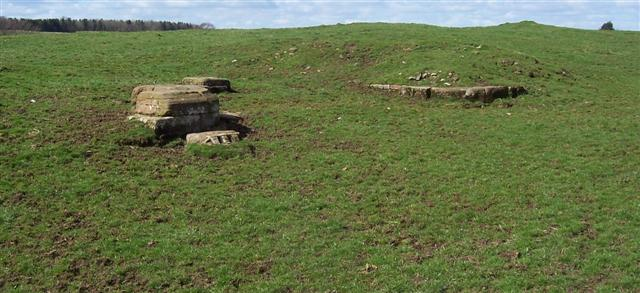
Remains of Voreda, a Roman Fort at Castelsteads, Plumpton
