= River Petteril =

River in Cumbria, England

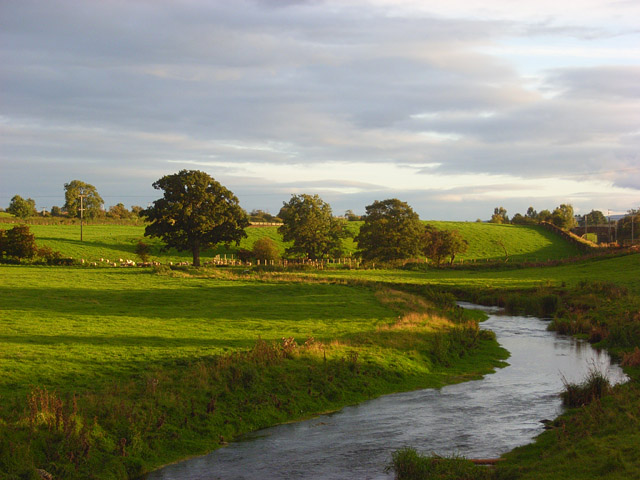
- Petteril from Kitchenhill bridge

- Location of the mouth within Cumbria

Location
- Country: United Kingdom
- Part: England
- County: Cumbria
- Unitary authority: Westmorland and Furness, Cumberland

Physical characteristics
- Source: near Penruddock and Motherby
- Mouth: Confluence with River Eden
  - coordinates: 54.8992°N 2.9203°W
- Length: 11 m (36 ft)

The River Petteril is a river running through the English county of Cumbria.

The source of the Petteril is near Penruddock and Motherby, from where the young river runs southeast through Greystoke, Blencow and Newton Reigny, before passing under the M6 motorway, after which the river turns north, and the motorway roughly follows the course of the river towards Carlisle.

Having reached Carlisle, the Petteril runs a course through the south east of Carlisle, dividing the suburbs of Harraby, Upperby and Botcherby, and running alongside the West Coast Main Line for a significant distance, before joining the River Eden on its journey to the Solway Firth. Along its course, the major tributaries of the Petteril include the River North Petteril, Stony Beck, Calthwaite Beck, Blackrack Beck, and Woodside Beck.

The Petteril was in the news in 2022 following a freight train derailment on 19 October, where the railway crosses the river near Carlisle. One cement wagon ended up upside down in the river.
