= Eden District =

Former local government district in England

Coordinates: 54.6667°N 2.7544°W

- Non-metropolitan district

- Shown within Cumbria
- Sovereign state: United Kingdom
- Constituent country: England
- Region: North West England
- Ceremonial county: Cumbria
- Historic county: Cumberland (part); Westmorland (part)
- Founded: 1 April 1974
- Abolished: 31 March 2023
- Admin. HQ: Penrith

Government
  - Type: Eden District Council
  - Leadership: Alternative - Sec.31

Area
  - Total: 827 sq mi (2,142 km^{2})

Population (2021)
  - Total: 54,955
  - Density: 66.45/sq mi (25.66/km^{2})
- Time zone: UTC+0 (Greenwich Mean Time)
  - Summer (DST): UTC+1 (British Summer Time)
- ONS code: 16UF (ONS); E07000030 (GSS)
- Ethnicity (2021): 94.8% White British 3.4% Other White 0.8% Asian 0.7% Mixed race 0.2% Black 0.3% Other
- Website: https://www.eden.gov.uk/

Eden was a local government district in Cumbria, England, based at Penrith Town Hall in Penrith. It was named after the River Eden, which flows north through the district toward Carlisle. Its population of 49,777 at the 2001 census, increased to 52,564 at the 2011 Census. A 2019 estimate was 53,253. In July 2021 it was announced that, in April 2023, Cumbria would be divided into two unitary authorities. On 1 April 2023, Eden District Council was abolished and its functions transferred to the new authority Westmorland and Furness, which also covers the former districts of Barrow-in-Furness and South Lakeland.

== Extent ==
The Eden District area of 2,156 sq. km (832 square miles) made it, after 2009, the eighth largest in England and the largest non-unitary district. It also had the lowest population density of any district in England and Wales, with a mean of 25 persons per square kilometre.

In 2011, the population was 5 per cent above its 2001 level.

The district council was created on 1 April 1974 under the Local Government Act 1972, from Penrith Urban District, Alston with Garrigill Rural District and Penrith Rural District, all in Cumberland, and Appleby Municipal Borough, part of Lakes urban district and North Westmorland Rural District, all in Westmorland. The district included parts of the Lake District and Yorkshire Dales national parks.

== Green space ==
It was shown in a national detailed Land Use Survey by the Office for National Statistics in 2005 that Eden District had the second lowest proportion of land taken up by roads of any district in England: 0.8 per cent, fractionally greater than Craven in North Yorkshire, which also adjoins the Pennines. This compares with a maximum of over 20 per cent in four London boroughs and the City of London.

In that detailed survey (to the nearest square metre) it was shown that Eden District had the greatest proportion of green space (which excludes domestic gardens) of any district, 97.9 per cent, as shown by the following extract:

| District | % Green space (June 2005) |
|---|---|
| Copeland | 96.0% |
| Scarborough | 96.1% |
| Ryedale | 96.3% |
| West Somerset | 96.6% |
| Northumberland | 96.7% |
| West Devon | 97.2% |
| Richmondshire | 97.5% |
| Eden | 97.9% |

== Wards ==
Below is a list of the wards that formed Eden (with numbers of councillors):

- Alston Moor (2)
- Appleby (Appleby) (1)
- Appleby (Bongate) (1)
- Askham (1)
- Brough (1)
- Crosby Ravensworth (1)
- Dacre (1)
- Eamont (1)
- Greystoke (1)
- Hartside (1)
- Hesket (2)
- Kirkby Stephen (2)
- Kirkby Thore (1)
- Kirkoswald (1)
- Langwathby (1)
- Lazonby (1)
- Long Marton (1)
- Morland (1)
- Orton with Tebay (1)
- Penrith Carleton (1)
- Penrith East (2)
- Penrith North (3)
- Penrith Pategill (1)
- Penrith South (2)
- Penrith West (2)
- Ravenstonedale (1)
- Shap (1)
- Skelton (1)
- Ullswater (1)
- Warcop (1)

== Map ==
Places in Eden

== Amenities ==
The Eden area includes King George's Fields, named after King George V, at Appleby and Patterdale.

The council owned the Penrith Leisure Centre, which is run by a private company under contract. The council also owned a number of playing fields and recreation grounds elsewhere in the district, notably the sports grounds at Frenchfield near Carleton on the outskirts of Penrith. Penrith and Eden Museum and the Penrith Tourist Information Centre were owned and run by the district council.

== See also ==
- Eden District Council elections
- List of churches in Eden District
