= Tarn Wadling =

Drained lake in England

Coordinates: 54°47′20″N 02°48′00″W

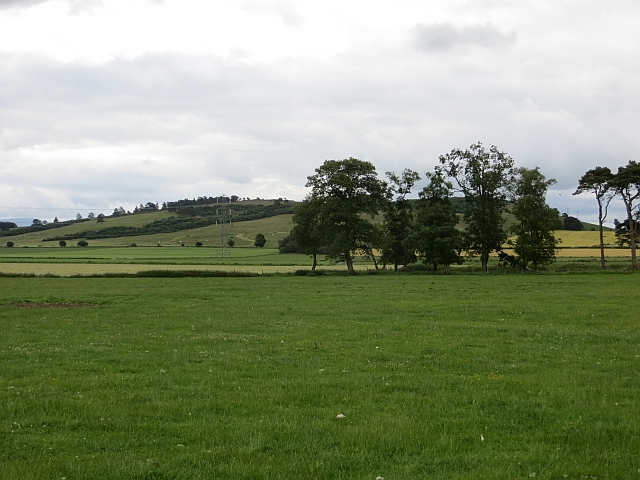
View of Tarn Wadling

Tarn Wadling (formerly spelled Turnewathelane, Terne Wathelyne, among others) was a lake between Carlisle and Penrith, near the village of High Hesket in Cumbria, England. In the Middle Ages, it was famous for its carp, but it was drained in the 19th century, and is now no more than a depression. The name remains today in a small woodland governed by the Woodland Trust.

Throughout the Middle Ages and in later folklore the tarn was associated with spectral appearances and functioned as a liminal place between the regular world and fairyland; it occurs in three Arthurian poems, all involving Sir Gawain.

== History ==
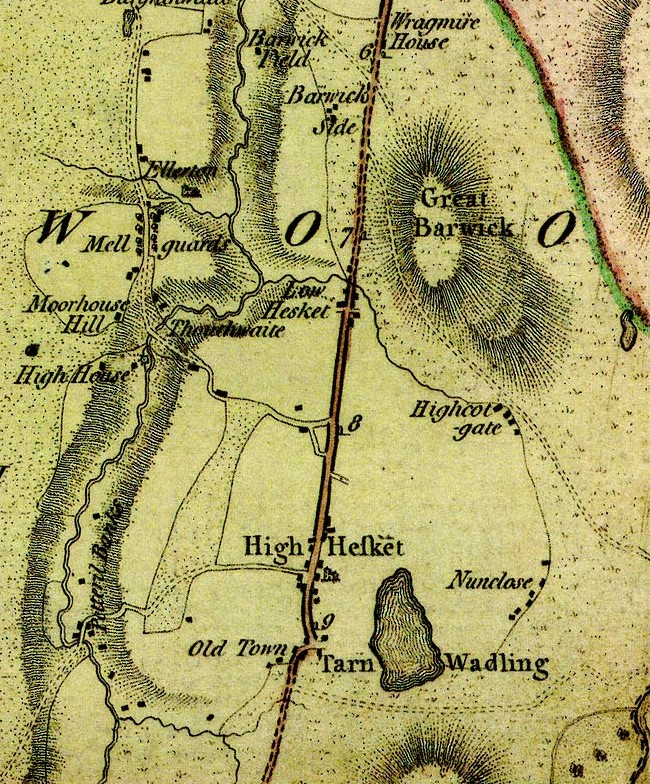
Tarn Wadling in relation to High Hesket, from Thomas Donald's 1774 map

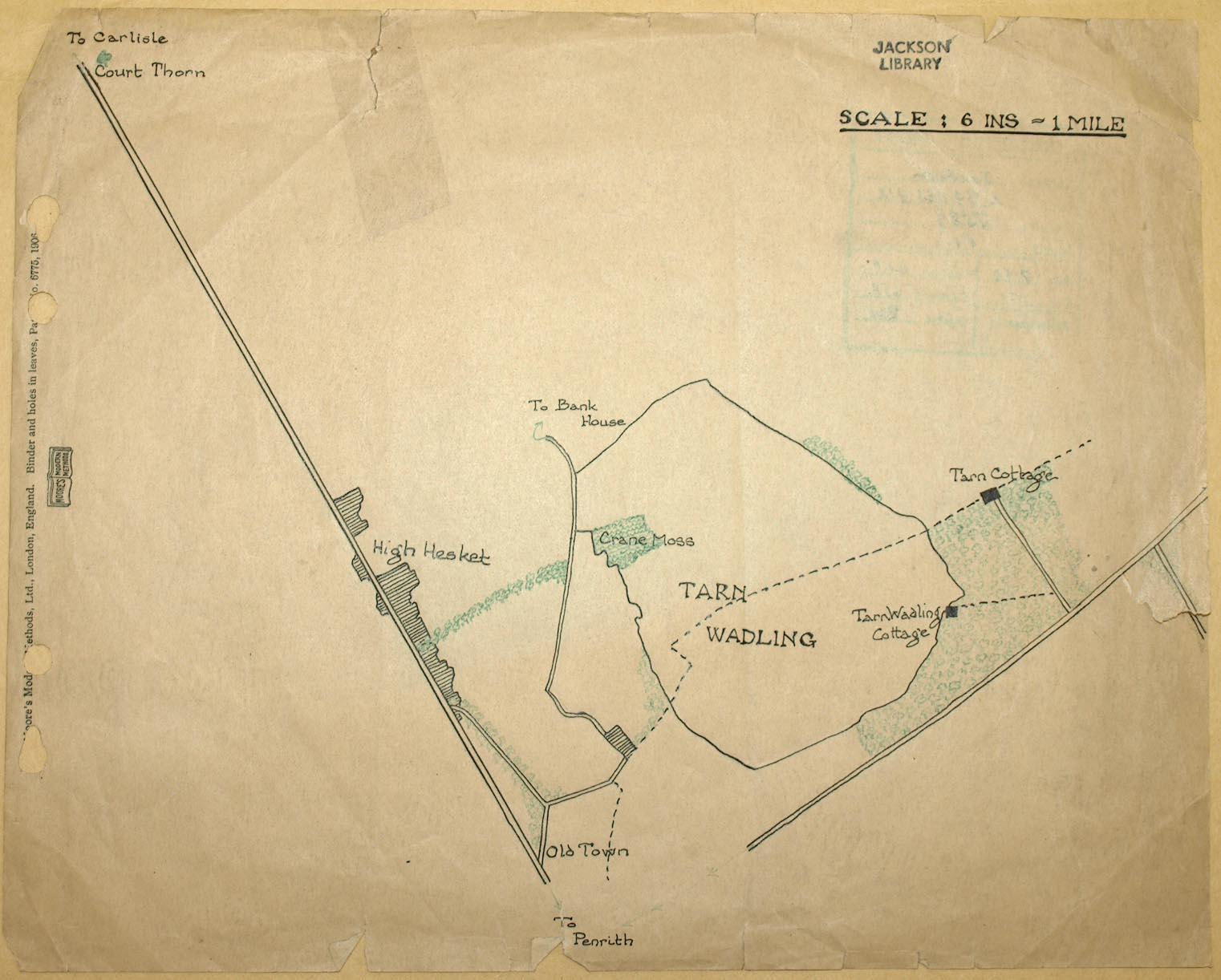
1910 map, showing Tarn Wadling

=== Origin and geology ===
The lake started as a kettle hole (a hole formed by a block of ice left by a retreating glacier). Various reported sounds (supposedly the pealing of a bell) could have been caused by the emission of methane. The appearance of an island (reported in 1810) could have been caused by a chunk of vegetation coming up from the bottom.

A geological description of the tarn was published by D. Walker in 1964. Walker described a "depression", some 600 yards in diameter. When glacial ice withdrew it left the hollow, though at a later stage, the "Scottish Readvance Glaciation", when ice advanced again to within a few kilometers, it was part of a much larger glacial lake, whose surface was at 440 ft (130 m) elevation. The former lake is now mostly filled with red sand, with silty mud on top. On the northwest edge of the former lake is a small bog called Crane Moss, above what used to be the shoreline.

=== Middle Ages ===
The lake was one of two lakes in Cumbria to appear on the Gough Map, the oldest road map of England. It is drawn considerably larger than Windermere, though that lake is almost forty times bigger; this can be explained, says Kathleen Coyne Kelly, following Daniel Birkholz's argument in The King's Two Maps (2004), by the political interest that underlies the Gough Map, which was used by Edward I of England to confirm his claims to Wales and Scotland. Tarn Wadling is important (more so than Windermere) because it is connected to King Arthur, who supposedly conquered Scotland—and Edward I claimed Arthur as an ancestor. (Note: The Gough Map indicates where the legendary founder of Britain, Brutus of Troy, would have landed (on the coast of Devon), and Brutus was an ancestor of Arthur: Edward was thus connected to the founding of Britain and to Arthur's conquests.) The Gough Map was a model for many others, including a map found in a sixteenth-century commonplace book, which also singles out Tarn Wadling graphically, with "zigzagging lines evok[ing] the sharpness of its surface wave". It seems there are no depictions of the tarn on any subsequent maps until the nineteenth century. The current two woodlands are the remains of a much larger wooded area that grew on the shores of the lake. (Note: The map from the Ordnance Survey of 1895, reproduced as figure 9.5 by Kathleen Coyne Kelly, p. 259, indicates that the woods at that time surrounded perhaps a fifth of the lake, ranging from the current Tarn Wadling woodland to the (much larger) copse now called Tarn Wood.) It is also mentioned in the Domesday Book. The woods go back to at least the 1600s, since all the woods in the area are designated as Ancient Semi-Natural Woodland or Planted Ancient Woodland. Today's Scots pine trees may have come from a line of trees that lined the drovers' road to the lake, adding to its historical significance.

The lake was owned by the Armathwaite Nunnery, and the Augustinians of the Diocese of Carlisle had fishing rights to the lake. The tarn was "famed for its production of the finest carp". As a fishery, its documented reputation goes back until at least the thirteenth century, when Carlisle's prior claimed a tithe on all fish from the lake. In the early fourteenth century, John de Crumwell, keeper of the forests north of the river Trent, allowed the Bishop of Carlisle to take fifty pike from the lake so he could restock his own ponds. Eels may have been fished as well. Later the Duke of Gloucester (the later Richard III of England) leased the lake.

William Hutchinson, in his 1794 History of the County of Cumberland, provided a description of the tarn. At the time it covered about one hundred acres (forty hectares) and belonged to a William Henry Milbourne, who also owned Armathwaite Castle. Hutchinson noted the quality of the carp, and gave a description of the lake that, as F. H. M. Parker pointed out in 1909, already indicated it was precariously situated:

This lake is in a remarkable situation, bordering upon a declivity, which descends towards the river for near a mile, and lies about six hundred perpendicular feet above the level of Eden, capable of being drained by a cut over a very narrow bank of earth.

The boggy area was suitable for growing cranberries, and important finds of beetles were made there, including the first Notiophilus rufipes in the British Isles. It was also a stopping place for waterfowl. Some of these details—the carp, the waterfowl—are also found in a description from 1802, quoted by David E. Bynum:

Tarn-wadling spreads its waters on a naked and barren common, about one mile west from the river Eden, at Armathwaite, above which it rises 600 ft (180 m) perpendicular. It covers about 100 acres (40 ha), and is much frequented by wild fowl: the carp it produces are extremely fine.

In 1816 it was owned by a Mr. Milbourne, according to Daniel and Samuel Lysons, the lord of the manor who owned the Castle Hewen, situated "on a lofty eminence near this tarn" (and thus having military potential). Bynum cites a source from 1895, which notes that it "has been filled up and converted into grazing land", and by 1932 it was still remembered, though its exact location was not clear, the location being incorrectly reported by John Bartholomew in the Survey Gazetteer of the British Isles.

In the 1850s, the Earl of Lonsdale drained the lake, possibly in order to have an area for training racehorses. (Note: An article in the 1899 edition of The Naturalist (a monthly journal dedicated to the topography of Northern England) mentions that the lake was drained "about fifty years ago", meaning ca. 1849, though Kathleen Coyne Kelly doubts that reason: Lonsdale was given a loan subsidized by the government under the 1819 inclosure act for Inglewood Forest (in parishes of Dalston, Edenhall, Great Salkeld, Hesket in the Forest, Hutton in the Forest, Lazonby, Penrith and Wetheral) whose purpose was to develop land for agriculture. A 1909 article from the Transactions of the Carlisle Natural History Society, however, dates the draining to 1858, as do other sources.) By 1907 Howard Maynadier described it as "a sedgy swamp where cattle feed". It filled again, partly: people skated on the ice in 1939. In the 1940s it was drained again, by Italian POWs, to create farmland. It is now just a "shallow dip in the ground". A boathouse remains.

=== Current status ===
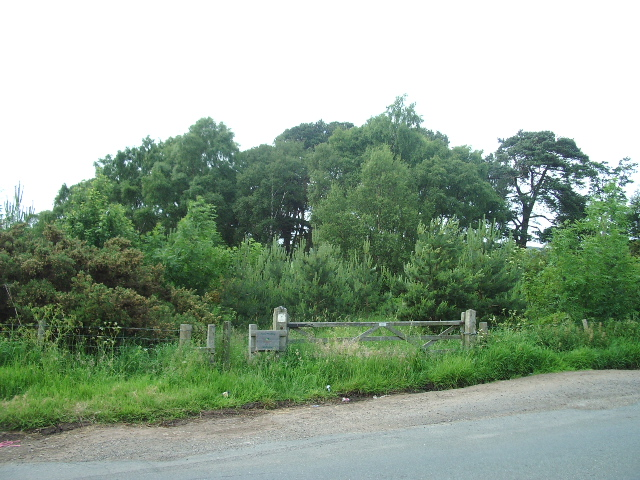
Entrance to Tarn Wadling

What is now called Tarn Wadling is a small wooded area on the former shoreline on the southern part of the tarn, with 120-year-old Scots pine and over 60-year-old birch. It is administered by the Woodland Trust, which bought it in 1997.

Tarn Wadling occupies 0.55 ha (1.4 acres), and is a rectangular area occupied by mostly mature woods surrounded by farmland; isolated from buildings and roads, it sees few visitors. The area is surrounded mostly by fences, with the remains of dry stone wall on the northwest and northeast boundaries. 2/3 of it is occupied by Scots pine, planted ca. 1880, and birch have moved in ca. 1950–1960, especially on the edges where there is sufficient light. In the southern part is an area, about 1/3 of the total property, which was planted in 1998, with Scots pine, oak, ash and cherry.

Access for pedestrians and woodland managers is via an unclassified road that runs east from the A6, near High Hesket, toward Armathwaite. There is room for two cars to park at the entrance to the wood, adjacent to an access gate for management.

== Folklore and literature ==
The lake was alleged to have magical qualities, and was called Laikibrait, "the lake that cries", in the 13th century by Gervase of Tilbury. (Note: The identification of "Laikibrait" (or "Laikibrais") with the tarn is made in the Pleas of the Forest of Inglewood, 1290-91, which documents legal proceedings pertaining to the forest and its revenues.) He wrote of the tarn:

In Great Britain there is a forest, rich in many kinds of game, which looks down on the city of Carlisle. Roughly in the middle of this forest there is a valley surrounded by hills near a public highway. In this valley, I say, every day at seven in the morning a gently-sounding peal of bells is heard.

Throughout the Middle Ages the lake was "widely associated ... with spectral apparitions". On 30 August 1810, a small island appeared in the lake and sank back into it after several months, like Avalon. Parker, writing in 1909, connected the lake to a giant who lived nearby in Castle Hewen, which is associated with Sir Ewen Caesarius, reportedly the killer of the dangerous wild boar of Inglewood Forest. He, in turn, is connected to two "Giant's Graves" in Penrith.

Local folklore told stories of the tarn still in the 1930s. A writer for the Cumberland News, W. T. McIntire, retells a number of local legends in 1931. One, from before the lake was drained, was that there was a village or town beneath the water, whose inhabitants were being punished for wickedness; a related story blames the submersion of the village on a witch. According to R. C. Cox, that is the story that may have drawn Gervase of Tilbury's interest, and may have provided the link between his "Laikibrait" and the submerged village whose church bells lament the fate of the villagers.

=== Arthurian literature ===
The lake occurs in three Arthurian poems (usually mentioned as being near Inglewood Forest, another Arthurian setting) involving Sir Gawain; according to Thomas Hahn, its importance is much greater than its size might warrant—it is also alluded to as a setting in The Wedding of Sir Gawain and Dame Ragnelle and The Greene Knight.

In the 15th-century poem The Awntyrs off Arthure, (Note: For an overview of some of the literature pertaining to the setting in the poem, see Jost, "Marshy Spaces", pp. 590–591 n. 6.) the tarn is the setting for the ghost of Queen Guinevere's mother, who speaks to Guinevere and Sir Gawain and warns them about pride. She mentions that she is in hell right now (Jean E. Jost notes the similarity to Mephistopheles's claim in Marlowe's Doctor Faustus), having fallen low into the lake with Lucifer. Andrew Murray Richmond links the apparition–a rotting body covered in toads and serpents, and announced by a gliding flame–directly to the tarn: "In effect, the apparition here becomes a 'tarn-woman': literally, she is composed of the physical and aesthetic components of the tarn—clay, serpents, toads, 'black' rot and shadows—layered atop, and woven throughout, a human skeleton. To an audience familiar with the environment of a tarn, the association is clear. These physical characteristics, of course, also carry connotations of spiritual significance evoking sins and the denizens of Hell." (Richmond links to hell, Jost links to Purgatory.)

It also occurs in the Child Ballad The Marriage of Sir Gawain, where "Tearne Wadling" (lines 32, 51) is the place where King Arthur meets the "Baron of Tearne Wadling" who threatens him; his sister is the story's "loathly lady". This baron emerges from Castle Hewen (the home of Owain mab Urien), which was supposedly built on a hill east of the tarn and which, according to Frederick John Snell, might be remembered in the name "Baron Wood", a small locality near the River Eden, a mile or so from the old tarn. In The Avowing of Arthur, Arthur, Kay, Baldwin, and Gawain each swear an oath; Gawain's is to keep watch by the tarn all night long.

Richmond, in a discussion of The Awntyrs off Arthure and Sir Isumbras argues that the literary function of the tarn (like other bodies of water in late medieval romance) reflects a belief in the understanding of such watery locations as "explicitly alien, yet intimately physical embodiments of divine power in the natural world". Mark Bruce and Katherine Terrell point at the tarn's liminal position, and cite Ralph Hanna, who noted that the tarn "should be understood as a place with spectral or magical connotations, possibly as a place where transfer from the Other World (whether hell or Faery) is possible".
