= The Daughter of King Under-Waves =

Scottish fairy tale

The Daughter Of King Under-Waves (Nighean Righ Fo Thuinn) is a Scottish fairy tale collected by John Francis Campbell in Popular Tales of the West Highlands. He listed as his source Roderick MacLean, a tailor of Ken Tangval, Barra, who reported hearing it from old men in South Uist, including Angus Macintyre, Bornish, who was about eighty. The text was written by H. MacLean, 1860.

It is a version of the tale of the loathly lady. This form of the tale appears in Hrólfr Kraki's saga and also in Child ballad 32, King Henry.

== Synopsis ==
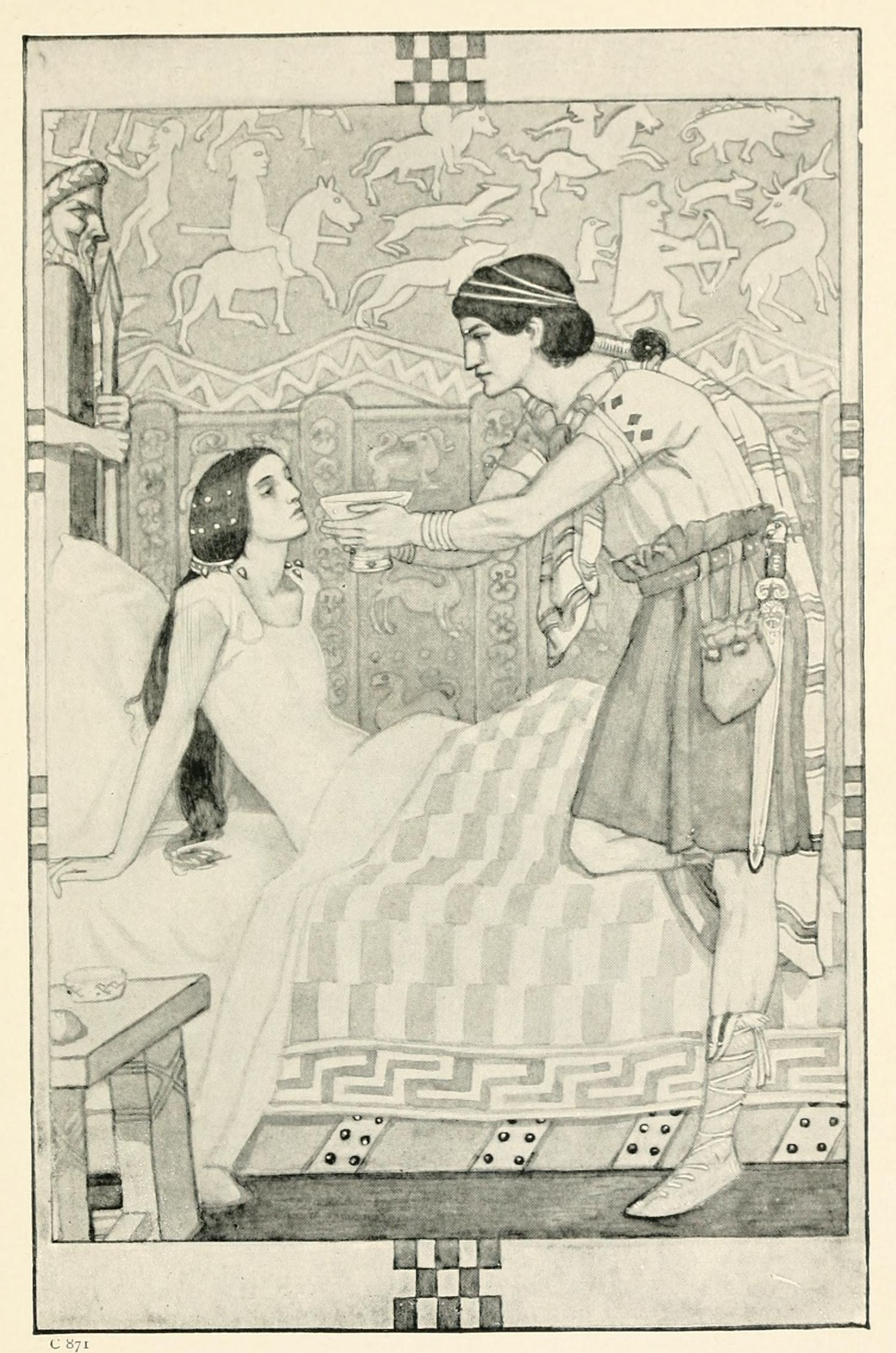
Drawing of the Daughter of King Under-waves by John Duncan

The Fhinn were on the side of Beinn Eudainn, during a wild night. An uncouth woman, with hair down to her heels, appeared to them. She appealed to Fionn for shelter and was rejected; she screamed and went to Oisean, who also rejected her; she screamed and went to Diarmaid, who sheltered her. She turned into the most beautiful woman they had ever seen. She asked Diarmaid where he would have the finest castle built, and he said above Beinn Eudainn. It appeared, and they lived there. Three times, she gave a greyhound pup to one of the Fhinn who asked for it, and Diarmaid angrily said that she would not have done it if she remembered what he had saved her from and then begged her pardon, but the third time, despite his apology, she and the castle vanished.

He set out in search and found his way under the sea; there, he found three gulps of blood. There he met a woman gathering rushes, who told him that the king's daughter had just returned and was ill; no doctor could help her, and a bed of rushes was the most wholesome. The woman carried him to her in the bundle of rushes, and they were glad to see each other. She told him she had lost three gulps of blood; when he told her he had them, she told him she needed the cup of Righ Magh an Ioghnaidh, the King of Plain of Wonder, to drink from to recover. He set out and came to a rivulet he could not cross. A little russet man brought him over, and he reached the castle. There he shouted that he wanted either the cup or battle, and the king three times sent out forces against him, and Diarmaid killed them all. The king asked who he was, and said that if he had known that he would have given him the cup, because he would have known he would kill all his men. The little russet man bore him back and told him how to cure the woman, and warned him that he would take a great dislike to her when he did, and should say so and accept only a return to his own land from the king. He gave her the drinks as the man had said, and she recovered, but he took a dislike to her and admitted it. He accepted nothing but a ship back to his home.

== Motifs ==
The loathly lady is a common motif, appearing in such tales as The Marriage of Sir Gawain.
