= The Avowing of Arthur =

Middle English poem

The Avowing of Arthur, or in full The Avowing of King Arthur, Sir Gawain, Sir Kay, and Baldwin of Britain, is an anonymous Middle English romance in 16-line tail-rhyme stanzas telling of the adventures of its four heroes in and around Carlisle and Inglewood Forest. The poem was probably composed towards the end of the 14th century or the beginning of the 15th century by a poet in the north of England. It exhibits many similarities of form and plot with Sir Gawain and the Green Knight and other romances of the Middle English Gawain cycle. Though formerly dismissed as an ill-organized collection of unconnected episodes, it has more recently been called a "complex and thought-provoking romance" with an effective diptych structure, which displays a wide knowledge of Arthurian and other tales and gives a fresh turn to them.

== Synopsis ==
King Arthur is holding court in Carlisle when he learns that there is a massive and savage boar in Inglewood Forest. The four title-characters set out to hunt it, but they are unsuccessful on the first day. They then each swear an oath: Arthur to kill the boar unaided the next day, Gawain to keep watch at a nearby lake called Tarn Wadling all night, and Kay to ride through the forest and fight anyone who crosses his path. Baldwin vows not to do three things, namely to be jealous of his wife, to refuse food to anyone, and to fear death. The next day Arthur kills his boar after a tremendous fight and, exhausted from his labours, falls asleep. Kay encounters a recreant knight, Menealfe, together with a damsel in distress, but he loses the ensuing fight and, at Menealfe's request, takes him to meet Gawain. Gawain wins a joust with Menealfe, and they all return to Carlisle, where Gawain wins much praise from Guinevere and Menealfe becomes a Knight of the Round Table.

To test Baldwin's last vow Arthur sends Kay and five other knights, all in disguise, to waylay him, but Baldwin overcomes them and, on being presently questioned by Arthur, says that no ill had befallen him, thereby demonstrating his carelessness of danger. Arthur next sends a minstrel to Baldwin's home, who reports that no visitor goes unfed there, so proving that he has also kept his second vow. Baldwin then invites Arthur to visit him. Arthur does so, and while Baldwin is out hunting he plants a knight into the bed of the mistress of the house. When Baldwin returns Arthur tells him there is a knight in his wife's bed, but Baldwin only replies that he trusts his wife. Arthur next asks Baldwin the reason for his three vows, and Baldwin relates three adventures that had previously befallen him. In the first, three women are driven to murder by sexual jealousy; in the second, a fearful knight who hides himself in a barrel to avoid fighting is killed there by a cannonball; in the third, he succeeds in raising a siege by lavishly wining and dining an envoy from the besieging forces, thereby persuading him that there is no hope of starving them out. The romance ends with the virtues of Baldwin and his wife being praised by one and all.

== Manuscript ==
The Avowing of Arthur survives in only one manuscript, Princeton University Library MS Taylor 9, sometimes known as the Ireland Blackburne manuscript from its 19th-century owner, John Ireland Blackburne of Hale Hall, Lancashire. This manuscript, probably indited around the middle of the 15th century in Lancashire, also contains two other romances, The Awntyrs off Arthure and Sir Amadace.

== Modern editions ==
- French, Walter Hoyt; Hale, Charles Brockway, eds. (1930). Middle English Metrical Romances. Volume 2. New York: Prentice-Hall.
- Smith, James A., ed. (1938). "The Avowynge of King Arthur, Sir Gawan, Sir Kaye and Sir Bawdewyn of Bretan": A Middle English Romance from the Ireland MS (MA). Leeds University.
- Brookhouse, Christopher (1968). Sir Amadace and The Avowing of Arthur: Two Romances from the Ireland MS. Anglistica 15. Copenhagen: Rosenkilde and Bagger.
- Dahood, Roger, ed. (1984). The Avowing of King Arthur. Garland Medieval Texts 10. New York: Garland. ISBN 9780824094270.
- Hahn, Thomas, ed. (1995). Sir Gawain: Eleven Romances and Tales. Kalamazoo: Medieval Institute Publications, Western Michigan University. ISBN 9781580444668.

== Translations ==
- Hall, Louis (1976). The Knightly Tales of Sir Gawain. Chicago: Nelson-Hall. ISBN 0882293508.
- Dass, Nirmal (1987). The Avowing of King Arthur: A Modern Verse Translation. Lanham, MD: University Press of America. ISBN 0819157694.
