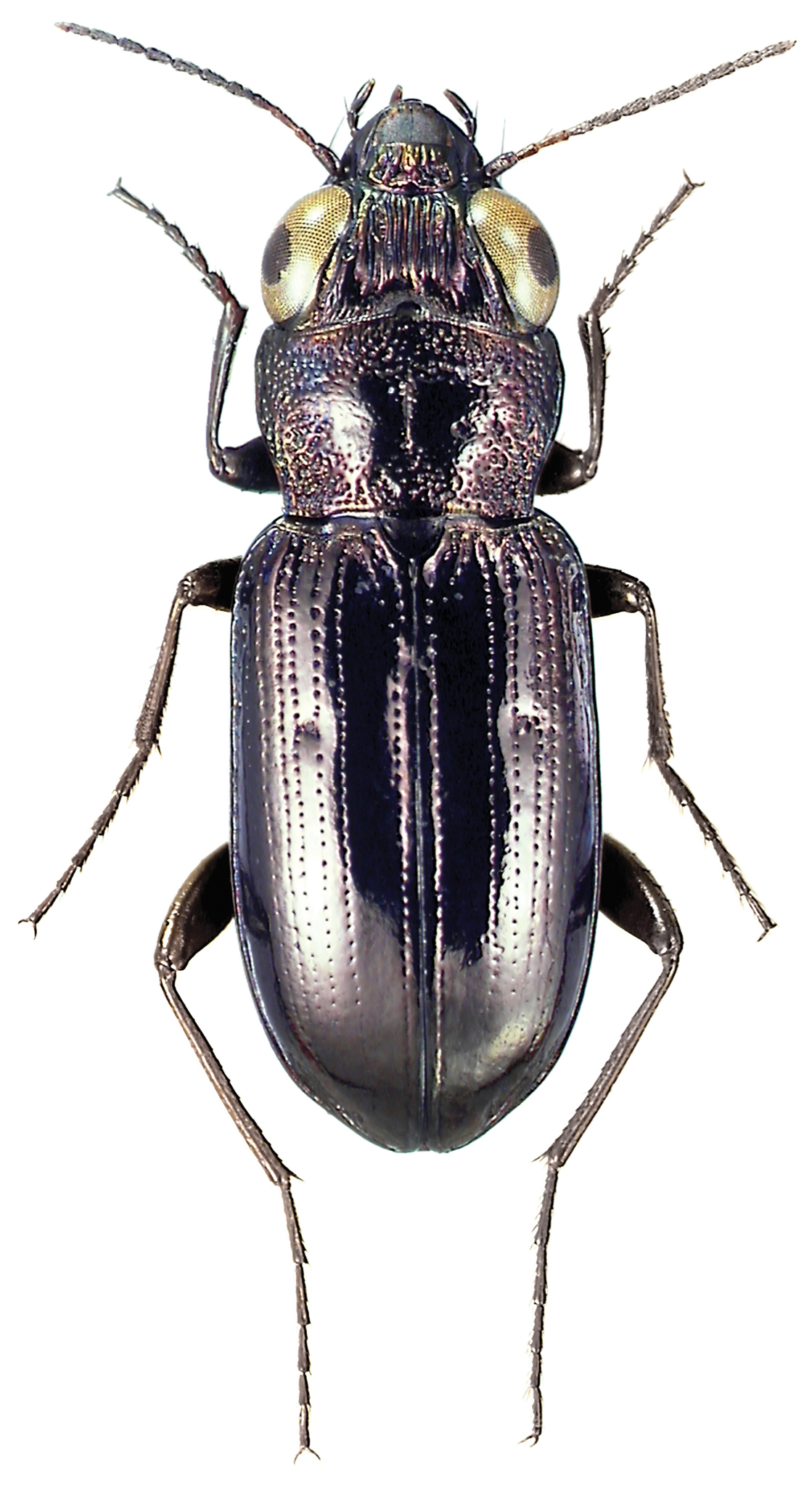

Scientific classification
- Kingdom: Animalia
- Phylum: Arthropoda
- Class: Insecta
- Order: Coleoptera
- Suborder: Adephaga
- Family: Carabidae
- Genus: Notiophilus
- Species: N. aquaticus

Binomial name
- Notiophilus aquaticus (Linnaeus, 1758)

Synonyms
- Cicindela aquatica Linnaeus, 1758; Notiophilus fuscipes Barsevskis, 1994; Notiophilus pseudoaesthuans Barsevskis, 1994; Notiophilus stoschkae Barsevskis, 1994; Notiophilus bimaculatus Barsevskis, 1993; Notiophilus spaethi Munster, 1922; Notiophilus blacki Edwards, 1913; Notiophilus dybowskii J.L.M.Lomnicki, 1903; Notiophilus kroli J.L.M.Lomnicki, 1903; Notiophilus pristinus Friederichs, 1903; Notiophilus apicalis Dalla Torre, 1877; Notiophilus obscurus Dalla Torre, 1877; Notiophilus obsoletus Dalla Torre, 1877; Notiophilus hardyi Putzeys, 1866; Notiophilus strigifrons Baudi di Selve, 1864; Notiophilus dauricus Chaudoir, 1850; Notiophilus metallicus G.R.Waterhouse, 1833; Notiophilus parvulus G.R.Waterhouse, 1833; Elaphrus semipunctatus Fabricius, 1775; Cicindela pusilla Schreber, 1759

= Notiophilus aquaticus =

Species of beetle

Notiophilus aquaticus, the black-legged springtail-stalker, is a species of ground beetle in the family Carabidae. It is found in Europe, Northern Asia, and North America. Its habitat consists of moraines, fields, meadows, roadsides, sand/gravel pits and forests.
