= Notiophilus nemoralis =

Scientific classification
- Domain: Eukaryota
- Kingdom: Animalia
- Phylum: Arthropoda
- Class: Insecta
- Order: Coleoptera
- Suborder: Adephaga
- Family: Carabidae
- Genus: Notiophilus
- Species: N. nemoralis

Binomial name
- Notiophilus nemoralis Fall, 1906

Species of beetle

Notiophilus nemoralis, the woodland big-eyed beetle, is a species of ground beetle in the family Carabidae. It is found in North America (Quebec, Massachusetts, Maine, New Hampshire, New York, Vermont), where it inhabits open coniferous forests.

Adults are brachypterous, mostly diurnal and gregarious.
