= Notiophilus aeneus =

Scientific classification
- Kingdom: Animalia
- Phylum: Arthropoda
- Class: Insecta
- Order: Coleoptera
- Suborder: Adephaga
- Family: Carabidae
- Genus: Notiophilus
- Species: N. aeneus

Binomial name
- Notiophilus aeneus (Herbst, 1806)

Synonyms
- Elaphrus aeneus Herbst, 1806; Notiophilus porrectus Say, 1830

Species of beetle

Notiophilus aeneus, also known as the brassy big-eyed beetle, is a species of ground beetle in the family Carabidae. It is found in North America. Approximately 5–6 mm long, it is dark colored with a brassy tinge and large eyes. Adults are diurnally active in spring and summer.
