= Notiophilus intermedius =

Scientific classification
- Domain: Eukaryota
- Kingdom: Animalia
- Phylum: Arthropoda
- Class: Insecta
- Order: Coleoptera
- Suborder: Adephaga
- Family: Carabidae
- Genus: Notiophilus
- Species: N. intermedius

Binomial name
- Notiophilus intermedius Lindroth, 1955

Species of beetle

Notiophilus intermedius, the intermediate big-eyed beetle, is a species of ground beetle in the family Carabidae. It is found in North America (British Columbia, Labrador, Manitoba, Newfoundland, Quebec, Alaska), where it inhabits sandy areas with sparse vegetation on river banks.

Adults are brachypterous and mostly diurnal.
