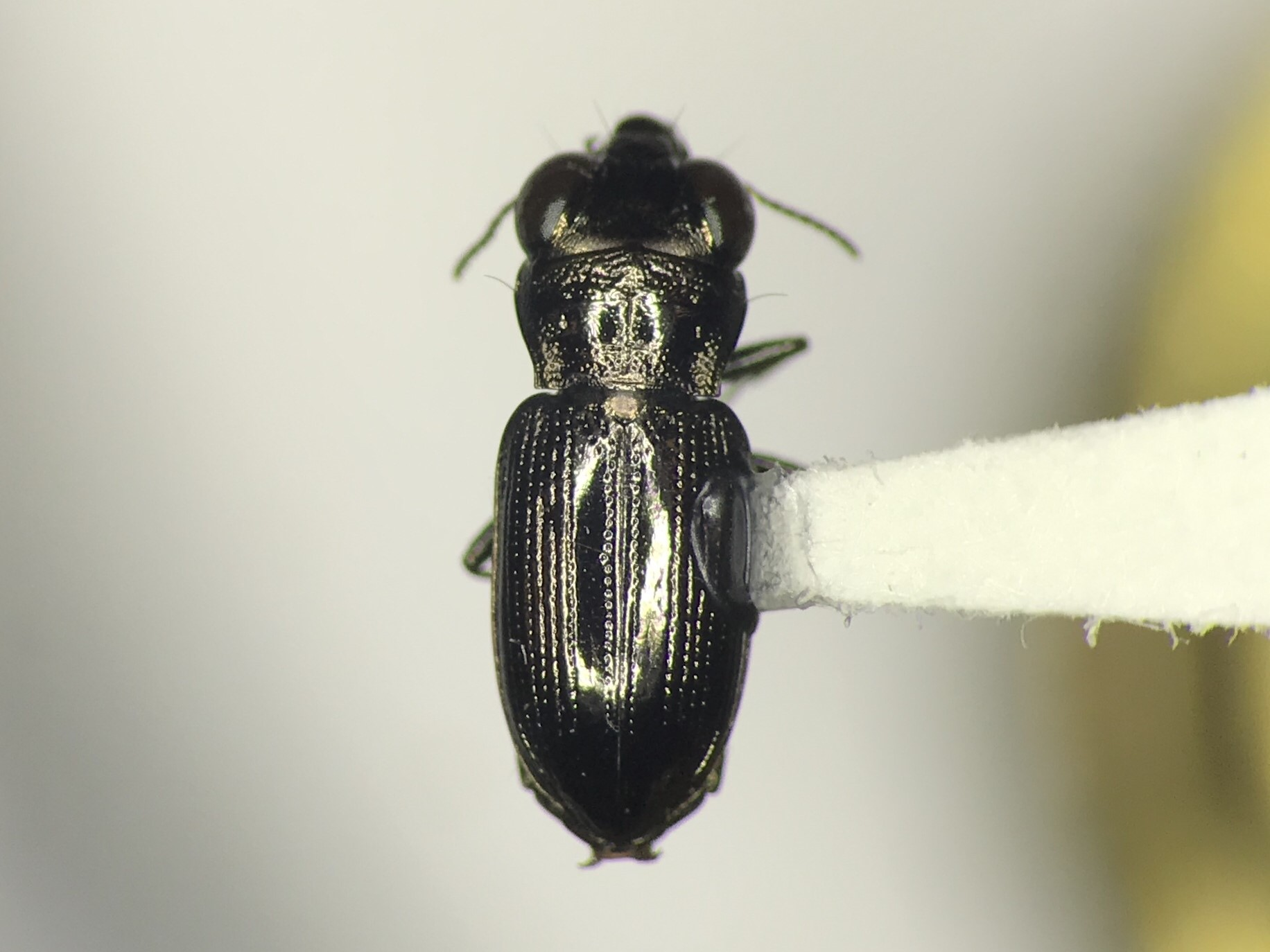

Scientific classification
- Domain: Eukaryota
- Kingdom: Animalia
- Phylum: Arthropoda
- Class: Insecta
- Order: Coleoptera
- Suborder: Adephaga
- Family: Carabidae
- Genus: Notiophilus
- Species: N. semistriatus

Binomial name
- Notiophilus semistriatus Say, 1823

Synonyms
- Notiophilus solodovnikovi Barsevskis, 2001; Notiophilus coloradensis Casey, 1920; Notiophilus americanus T.W.Harris, 1869; Notiophilus punctatus LeConte, 1850; Notiophilus confusus LeConte, 1847; Nothiophilus semistriatus Say, 1823

= Notiophilus semistriatus =

Species of beetle

Notiophilus semistriatus, the semi-striate big-eyed beetle, is a species of ground beetle in the family Carabidae. It is found in North America, where it inhabits moraines, abandoned fields, roadsides, orchards and forest edges.

Adults are mostly diurnal and wing-dimorphic, with some adults being macropterous, while others are brachypterous.
