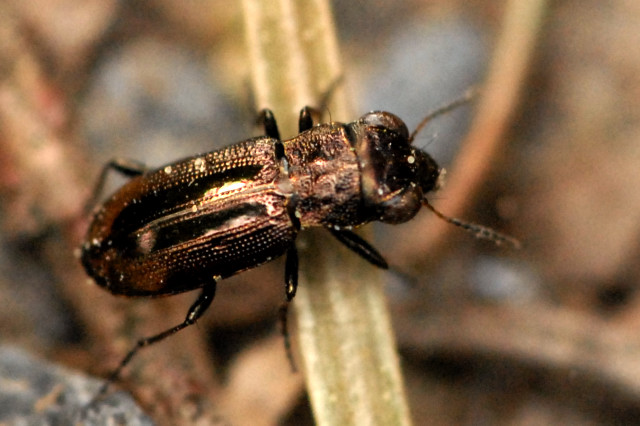
- Notiophilus biguttatus

Scientific classification
- Domain: Eukaryota
- Kingdom: Animalia
- Phylum: Arthropoda
- Class: Insecta
- Order: Coleoptera
- Suborder: Adephaga
- Family: Carabidae
- Subfamily: Nebriinae
- Tribe: Notiophilini
- Genus: Notiophilus; Duméril, 1805

= Notiophilus =

Genus of beetles

Notiophilus is a genus of ground beetle native to the Palearctic, the Nearctic, the Near East and North Africa. Most known for their distinctive head shape and size-body ratio the genus is sometimes referred to as the springtail stalkers.

== Species ==
These 60 species belong to the genus Notiophilus:

- Notiophilus aeneus (Herbst, 1806)
- Notiophilus aestuans Dejean, 1826
- Notiophilus altaicus Kabak, 2014
- Notiophilus anichtchenkoi Barsevskis, 2009
- Notiophilus aquaticus (Linnaeus, 1758)
- Notiophilus biguttatus (Fabricius, 1779)
- Notiophilus borealis T.W.Harris, 1869
- Notiophilus breviusculus Solsky, 1873
- Notiophilus chihuahuae Casey, 1913
- Notiophilus chinensis Barsevskis, 2003
- Notiophilus dacatrai Barsevskis, 2004
- Notiophilus danieli Reitter, 1897
- Notiophilus directus Casey, 1920
- Notiophilus dostali Barsevskis, 2011
- Notiophilus facchinii Barsevskis, 2003
- Notiophilus fasciatus Mäklin, 1855
- Notiophilus gansuensis Barsevskis, 2003
- Notiophilus geminatus Dejean, 1831
- Notiophilus germinyi Fauvel, 1863
- Notiophilus ghilarovi Kryzhanovskij, 1995
- Notiophilus hauseri Spaeth, 1900
- Notiophilus heinzi Dostal, 1986
- Notiophilus hilaris Friederichs, 1903
- Notiophilus hyperboreus Kryzhanovskij, 1995
- Notiophilus impressifrons A.Morawitz, 1862
- Notiophilus intermedius Lindroth, 1955
- Notiophilus interstitialis Reitter, 1889
- Notiophilus jakovlevi Tschitscherine, 1903
- Notiophilus kaszabi Jedlicka, 1968
- Notiophilus katrinae Barsevskis, 2005
- Notiophilus kirschenhoferi Dostal, 1981
- Notiophilus laticollis Chaudoir, 1850
- Notiophilus marginatus Gené, 1839
- Notiophilus nemoralis Fall, 1906
- Notiophilus nepalensis Dostal, 1986
- Notiophilus nitens LeConte, 1857
- Notiophilus novemstriatus LeConte, 1847
- Notiophilus nuristanensis Barsevskis, 2011
- Notiophilus orientalis Chaudoir, 1850
- Notiophilus ovalis Breit, 1914
- Notiophilus palustris (Duftschmid, 1812)
- Notiophilus persicus Breit, 1914
- Notiophilus quadripunctatus Dejean, 1826
- Notiophilus radians Andrewes, 1926
- Notiophilus rufipes Curtis, 1829
- Notiophilus schawalleri Barsevskis, 2003
- Notiophilus semenovi Tschitscherine, 1903
- Notiophilus semiopacus Eschscholtz, 1833
- Notiophilus semistriatus Say, 1823
- Notiophilus sibiricus Motschulsky, 1844
- Notiophilus sichuanensis Barsevskis, 2003
- Notiophilus sierranus Casey, 1920
- Notiophilus simulator Fall, 1906
- Notiophilus spaethi Reitter, 1913
- Notiophilus specularis Bates, 1881
- Notiophilus stackelbergi Kryzhanovskij, 1995
- Notiophilus sublaevis Solsky, 1873
- Notiophilus substriatus G.R.Waterhouse, 1833
- Notiophilus sylvaticus Eschscholtz, 1833
- Notiophilus tshitsherini Zaitzev, 1916
