= Notiophilus sierranus =

Scientific classification
- Kingdom: Animalia
- Phylum: Arthropoda
- Class: Insecta
- Order: Coleoptera
- Suborder: Adephaga
- Family: Carabidae
- Genus: Notiophilus
- Species: N. sierranus

Binomial name
- Notiophilus sierranus Casey, 1920

Synonyms
- Notiophilus obscuratus Fall, 1926; Notiophilus obscurus Fall, 1901

Species of beetle

Notiophilus sierranus, the mountain big-eyed beetle, is a species of ground beetle in the family Carabidae. It is found in North America (California), where it may be found in midlands areas.

Adults are brachypterous.
