= The Marriage of Sir Gawain =

Traditional song

"The Marriage of Sir Gawain" is an English Arthurian ballad, collected as Child Ballad 31. Found in the Percy Folio, it is a fragmented account of the story of Sir Gawain and the loathly lady, which has been preserved in fuller form in the medieval poem The Wedding of Sir Gawain and Dame Ragnelle. The loathly lady episode itself dates at least back to Geoffrey Chaucer's "Wife of Bath's Tale" from The Canterbury Tales. Unlike most of the Child Ballads, but like the Arthurian "King Arthur and King Cornwall" and "The Boy and the Mantle", "The Marriage of Sir Gawain" is not a folk ballad but a song for professional minstrels.

== Synopsis ==
One Christmas, at Tarn Wadling near Carlisle, King Arthur is challenged by a menacing 'baron.' To avoid a fight, Arthur agrees to return the following New Year, on pain of forfeit of his land and liberty, and tell the baron 'what thing it is / That a woman most desire.' Arthur returns to Carlisle. The following New Year, still without an answer, he is riding across a moor on his way to meet the baron, when he meets an old woman, to whom he offers Sir Gawain as a husband in return for the answer to the baron's riddle. The bargain is made. Arthur rides on to Tarn Wadling. He gives the baron the woman's answer: 'A woman will have her will, / And this is all her chief desire.' The baron admits this answer is the right one, and angrily curses the hag, who, he reveals, is his sister. Having successfully escaped from the baron, Arthur returns to Carlisle to deal with the matter of the hag's marriage.

Gawain consents to the marriage with the woman. The wedding takes place. On the wedding night, she is transformed into a beautiful young woman. She offers Gawain the choice 'Wether thou wilt have me in this liknesse / In the night or else in the day.' Gawain prefers to have her beautiful at night, but she would prefer her beauty by day. Gawain breaks the impasse by allowing her to choose. She jubilantly informs him that she will now be beautiful both by day and by night, and reveals that she and her brother were cursed by their stepmother's witchcraft. All ends happily.

== Commentary ==
The poem is significant as a retelling of the loathly lady episode, which hearkens back to a common motif in earlier literature, attested earliest in Irish. The closest analogue is the medieval The Wedding of Sir Gawain and Dame Ragnelle. A similar bride is found in "King Henry", Child Ballad 32. The 14th- or 15th-century poem The Awntyrs off Arthure at the Tern Wathelyne also involves Gawain and Arthur meeting a mysterious woman at the Tarn Wadling, but the rest of the story is different.

The positive view it expresses of Gawain, who is willing to marry the woman who saved King Arthur despite her hideous looks, is not a common feature of Arthurian literature at the time. It is often noted that Sir Gawain breaks the spell by giving her her own way, as in the riddle.

== See also ==
- List of the Child Ballads
- The Tale of the Hoodie
- The False Prince and the True
