= The Wedding of Sir Gawain and Dame Ragnelle =

15th-century English poem

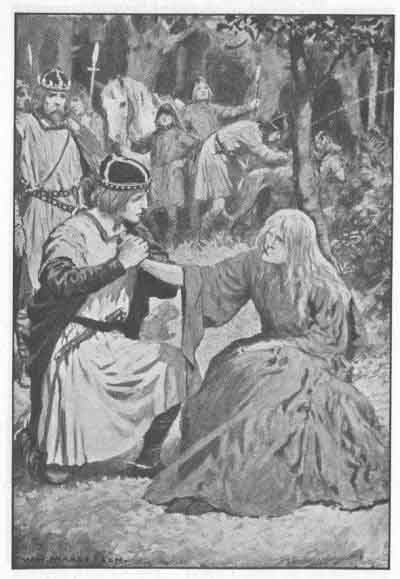
"Lady, I will be a true and loyal husband." Gawain and the loathly lady in W. H. Margetson's illustration for Maud Isabel Ebbutt's Hero-Myths and Legends of the British Race (1910).

The Wedding of Sir Gawain and Dame Ragnelle (The Weddynge of Syr Gawen and Dame Ragnell) is a 15th-century English poem composed of 855 lines, and one of several versions of the "loathly lady" story popular during the Middle Ages. An earlier version of the story appears as The Wife of Bath's Tale in Geoffrey Chaucer's The Canterbury Tales, and the later ballad The Marriage of Sir Gawain is essentially a retelling, though its relationship to the medieval poem is uncertain. The author's name is not known, but similarities to Le Morte d'Arthur have led to the suggestion that the poem may have been written by Sir Thomas Malory.

== Manuscripts and audience ==
Stories about the Arthurian court were popular in medieval England, and the worn condition of some of the manuscripts suggests that they were well read. The Ragnelle narrative may have been intended for a festive or less than serious audience. Thomas Garbáty sees the poem as a humorous parody of the Arthurian legend, where Arthur is cowed by both the challenging knight and Ragnelle, "passing the buck" to Gawain. The Wedding of Sir Gawain survives in a poorly copied 16th-century manuscript located in the Bodleian Library (Bodleian 11951, formerly Rawlinson C. 86) though it was probably written in the 15th century.

== Summary ==
The story begins when the mystical knight Sir Gromer Somer Joure challenges King Arthur to discover what women desire the most, or face dire consequences. This encounter takes place following the stalking of a deer by the king in Inglewood Forest, a setting that in other Middle English Arthurian poems such as The Awntyrs off Arthure and Sir Gawain and the Carle of Carlisle, is a haunted forest and a place where the Otherworld is near at hand. The king, on his own instructions, becomes separated from the rest of his hunting party, follows the deer, kills it and is then surprised by the arrival of an armed knight, Sir Gromer Somer Joure, whose lands, this knight claims, have been seized from him by Sir Gawain. King Arthur is alone and unarmed and Sir Gromer's arrival poses a real threat to him. Sir Gromer tells the king that he must return in exactly one year's time, alone and dressed as he is now, and give him the answer to a question he will ask. If the king fails to give a satisfactory answer, Sir Gromer will cut off his head. The question is this: what is it that women most desire?

King Arthur returns to Carlisle with his knights and it is not long before Sir Gawain pries from his uncle the reason for his sudden melancholy. King Arthur explains to his nephew what happened to him in the forest and Sir Gawain optimistically suggests that they both ride about the country collecting answers to this tricky question. So they both do this, riding separately about the kingdom and writing down the answers they receive. When they return, they compare notes.

Sir Gawain is still willing, but King Arthur senses the hopelessness of it all and decides to go once more into Inglewood Forest to look for inspiration. In the forest he encounters an ugly hag on a fine horse, a loathly lady who claims to know the king's problem and offers to give him the answer to this question that will save his life, on one condition: that she is allowed to marry Sir Gawain. The king returns to Carlisle and reluctantly confronts Sir Gawain with this dilemma; for he is sure that his nephew will be willing to sacrifice himself in order to save him. Gawain selflessly consents in order to save his uncle. Soon, King Arthur rides alone into the forest to fulfill his promise to Sir Gromer Somer Joure and quickly meets with Dame Ragnelle, who is, in fact, Sir Gromer's sister and who reminds King Arthur of the hopelessness of his task:

The kyng had rydden butt a while,
Lytelle more then the space of a myle,
Or he mett Dame Ragnelle.
"Ah, Sir Kyng! Ye arre nowe welcum here.
I wott ye ryde to bere your answere;
That wolle avaylle you no dele."

King Arthur tells her that Sir Gawain accepts her terms and she reveals to him that what women desire most is sovereynté over men. With this answer King Arthur wins Gromer's challenge, and much to his despair, the wedding of Gawain and Ragnelle goes ahead as planned.

Later, the newlyweds retire to their bedroom. After brief hesitation, Gawain assents to treat his new bride as he would if she were desirable, and go to bed with her as a dutiful husband is expected to do. However, when he looks up, he is astonished to see not an ugly hag, but the most beautiful woman he has ever seen standing before him. Ragnelle explains she had been under a spell to look like a hag until a good knight married her; now her looks will be restored, but only half the day. She gives him a choice—would he rather have her beautiful at night, when they are together, or during the day, when they are with others? Instead, his heart swells with love and he allows her to make the choice herself. This answer lifts the curse for good, and Ragnelle's beauty returns permanently.

The couple live happily, and the court is overjoyed when they hear Ragnelle's story. Sadly, Ragnelle lives for only five more years, after which Gawain mourns her for the rest of his life. According to the poem, Ragnelle bore Gawain his son Gingalain, who is the hero of his own romance and whose arrival at King Arthur's court and subsequent adventures are related, possibly by Thomas Chestre, in the Middle English version of the story of The Fair Unknown, or Lybeaus Desconus (although in this and most other versions of the story, Gingalain's mother is a fay who raises him ignorant of his father). The poem concludes with the poet's plea that God will help him get out of jail, leading P.J.C. Field to suggest that the poem may have been written by Sir Thomas Malory.

== Analysis ==
The Wedding of Sir Gawain and Dame Ragnelle was most likely written after Geoffrey Chaucer's The Wife of Bath's Tale, one of The Canterbury Tales. The differences between the two almost identical plots lead scholars to believe that the poem is a parody of the romantic medieval tradition. The physical characteristics of Dame Ragnelle are exaggerated in comparison to the earlier text. Other characters, such as Sir Gawain and King Arthur, are portrayed as very stylized stereotypes of themselves.

There are many references to aristocratic practices which seem to indicate the author's overall distaste for them. For example, Dame Ragnelle behaves appallingly at the Wedding feast, offending the onlookers; however, because she is now married to a knight, she must be considered better than the population regardless of her atrocious manners. Also, when King Arthur is presented with the challenge by Sir Gromer, it is expected that a knight should take on the mission for him. In other Arthurian stories, the challenge often involves danger or threat to the king, but this instance seems like a silly task to delegate, although the king's life is still at stake if the correct answer is not found. The other most prominent ritual is the spoken oath. The author lends a more approving tone to the notion of using a spoken word as a trustworthy contract. Throughout the story, everyone remains good to their word, and nothing bad comes of it. Perhaps the author used this as a contrast to indicate that, while most social practices were ridiculous, it was appropriate to keep the useful ones.

Another major theme in the poem is the reversal of stereotypical gender roles. Because Dame Ragnelle is a hag with no manners, she falls out of the expected female role. While Gromer is attempting to regain control of the land that he claims should be his, Dame Ragnelle simply circumvents the system. She strategizes with Gawain to marry into a more desired class with a title, at which point she no longer needs to regain her family's land which would have gone straight to the male heir, Gromer, regardless. Ragnelle's power over others and in society generally increase through the poem.
