= Notiophilus nitens =

Scientific classification
- Domain: Eukaryota
- Kingdom: Animalia
- Phylum: Arthropoda
- Class: Insecta
- Order: Coleoptera
- Suborder: Adephaga
- Family: Carabidae
- Genus: Notiophilus
- Species: N. nitens

Binomial name
- Notiophilus nitens Leconte, 1857

Species of beetle

Notiophilus nitens, the bright big-eyed beetle, is a species of ground beetle in the family Carabidae. It is found in North America (British Columbia, Idaho, Montana, Oregon, Washington). Its habitat consists of grasslands, pastures, cultivated fields and hills.

Adults are wing-dimorphic, with some adults being brachypterous and others macropterous.
