= Notiophilus specularis =

Scientific classification
- Kingdom: Animalia
- Phylum: Arthropoda
- Class: Insecta
- Order: Coleoptera
- Suborder: Adephaga
- Family: Carabidae
- Genus: Notiophilus
- Species: N. specularis

Binomial name
- Notiophilus specularis Bates, 1881

Species of beetle

Notiophilus specularis, the mirror-winged big-eyed beetle, is a species of beetle of the Carabidae family. This species is found in El Salvador, Guatemala and Mexico, where it inhabits mesophilic and cloud forests, oak, pine/oak forests, pine/alder/manzanita forest edge, as well as avocado orchards.

Adults are at least partly brachypterous.
