= King Henry (song) =

Child ballad

"King Henry" (Child 32, Roud 3967) is an English-language folk song. It is a version of the tale of the loathly lady. This form of the tale appears in Hrólfr Kraki's saga and also in the Scottish tale "The Daughter Of King Under-Waves". A similar bride is found in "The Marriage of Sir Gawain".

The Vaughan Williams catalogue has an entry with Mrs Anna Brown of Fifeshire as the source singer, collected 1792 - 94. There is version of the ballad in Walter Scott's Minstrelsy of the Scottish Border, derived from a manuscript held by Mrs. Brown.

Rupert Ferguson has suggested that the character King Henrie may take inspiration from Ynyr Gwent (b. c.430), a Welsh prince who married Madryn, the daughter of Gwrthefyr fab Gwrtheyrn, to claim the Gwentish throne, and/or Prince Henry of Scotland (1114 - 1152), the son and heir apparent of King David I.

== Recordings ==
Steeleye Span included a version on the 1972 album Below the Salt.

Martin Carthy also recorded a version, on both Shearwater and The Carthy Chronicles: A Journey Through the Folk Revival disk 4 'Child:Carthy'.

Alexander James Adams, at the time recording as Heather Alexander, included "King Henry-Black Nag" on the 2003 album Festival Wind.

Faun translated the song into German as "Herr Heinerich" for their album Buch der Balladen.

The Furrow Collective recorded this on the album At Our Next Meeting (2014).

== See also ==
- List of the Child Ballads
