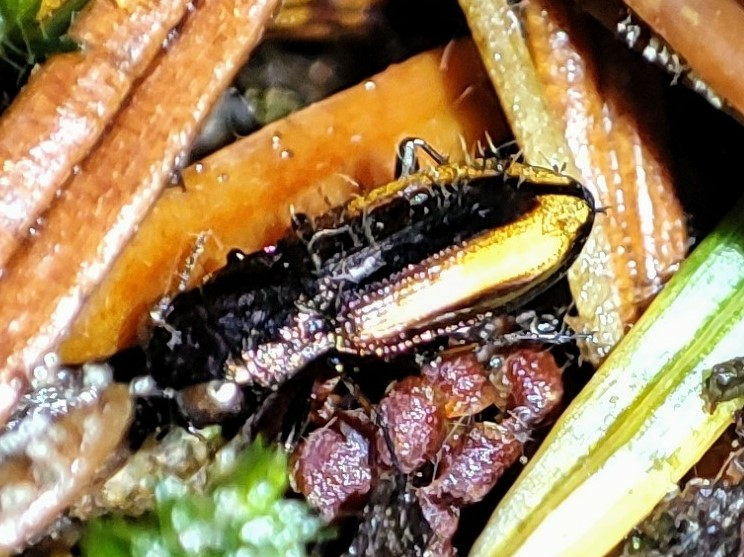

Scientific classification
- Kingdom: Animalia
- Phylum: Arthropoda
- Class: Insecta
- Order: Coleoptera
- Suborder: Adephaga
- Family: Carabidae
- Genus: Notiophilus
- Species: N. sylvaticus

Binomial name
- Notiophilus sylvaticus Dejean, 1831

= Notiophilus sylvaticus =

Species of beetle

Notiophilus sylvaticus, the forest big-eyed beetle, is a species of ground beetle in the family Carabidae. It is found in North America (British Columbia, Quebec, Alaska, California, Idaho, New Mexico, Oregon, Washington), where it inhabits open forests and meadows.

Adults are gregarious, mostly diurnal and wing-dimorphic, with some adults being brachypterous, while others are macropterous.
