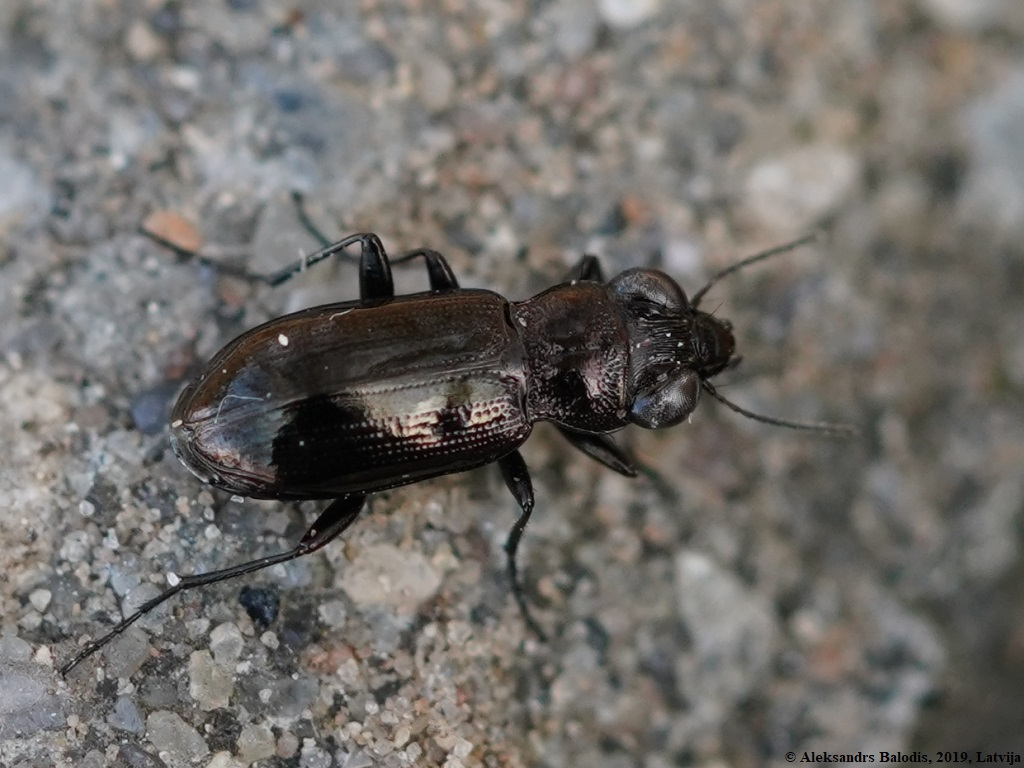

Scientific classification
- Kingdom: Animalia
- Phylum: Arthropoda
- Clade: Pancrustacea
- Class: Insecta
- Order: Coleoptera
- Suborder: Adephaga
- Family: Carabidae
- Genus: Notiophilus
- Species: N. aestuans

Binomial name
- Notiophilus aestuans Motschulsky, 1864

Synonyms
- Notiophilus kniephofi Hänel, 1913; Notiophilus tristis Hänel, 1913; Notiophilus bigeminus C.G.Thomson, 1883; Notiophilus longipennis Putzeys, 1866; Notiophilus aesthuans Motschulsky, 1864; Notiophilus pusillus G.R.Waterhouse, 1833

= Notiophilus aestuans =

Species of beetle

Notiophilus aestuans is a species of ground beetle native to Europe and the Near East (Ireland, Great Britain, Denmark, Norway, Sweden, Finland, France, Belgium, Netherlands, Germany, Switzerland, Austria, Czechia, Slovakia, Hungary, Poland, Estonia, Latvia, Lithuania, Belarus, Ukraine, Spain, Italy, Slovenia, Croatia, Bosnia-Herzegovina, former Yugoslavia, North Macedonia, Albania, Greece, Bulgaria, Moldova, Syria, Turkey, Iran, Georgia, Armenia, Azerbaijan, Russia).
