= Notiophilus borealis =

Scientific classification
- Domain: Eukaryota
- Kingdom: Animalia
- Phylum: Arthropoda
- Class: Insecta
- Order: Coleoptera
- Suborder: Adephaga
- Family: Carabidae
- Genus: Notiophilus
- Species: N. borealis

Binomial name
- Notiophilus borealis T. Harris, 1869

Species of beetle

Notiophilus borealis, the northern big-eyed beetle, is a species of ground beetle in the family Carabidae. It is found in Europe and Northern Asia (excluding China) and North America. It inhabits open or slightly shaded gravelly/sandy ground with sparse or short vegetation on moraines, meadows, roadsides and open forests.
