= The False Prince and the True =

Portuguese fairy tale

The False Prince and the True is a Portuguese fairy tale. Andrew Lang included it in The Lilac Fairy Book.

== Synopsis ==
A king received word that his son, the prince, and a gentleman had argued over tennis until the other man struck the prince. The prince, though armed, had not returned the attack but only cried.

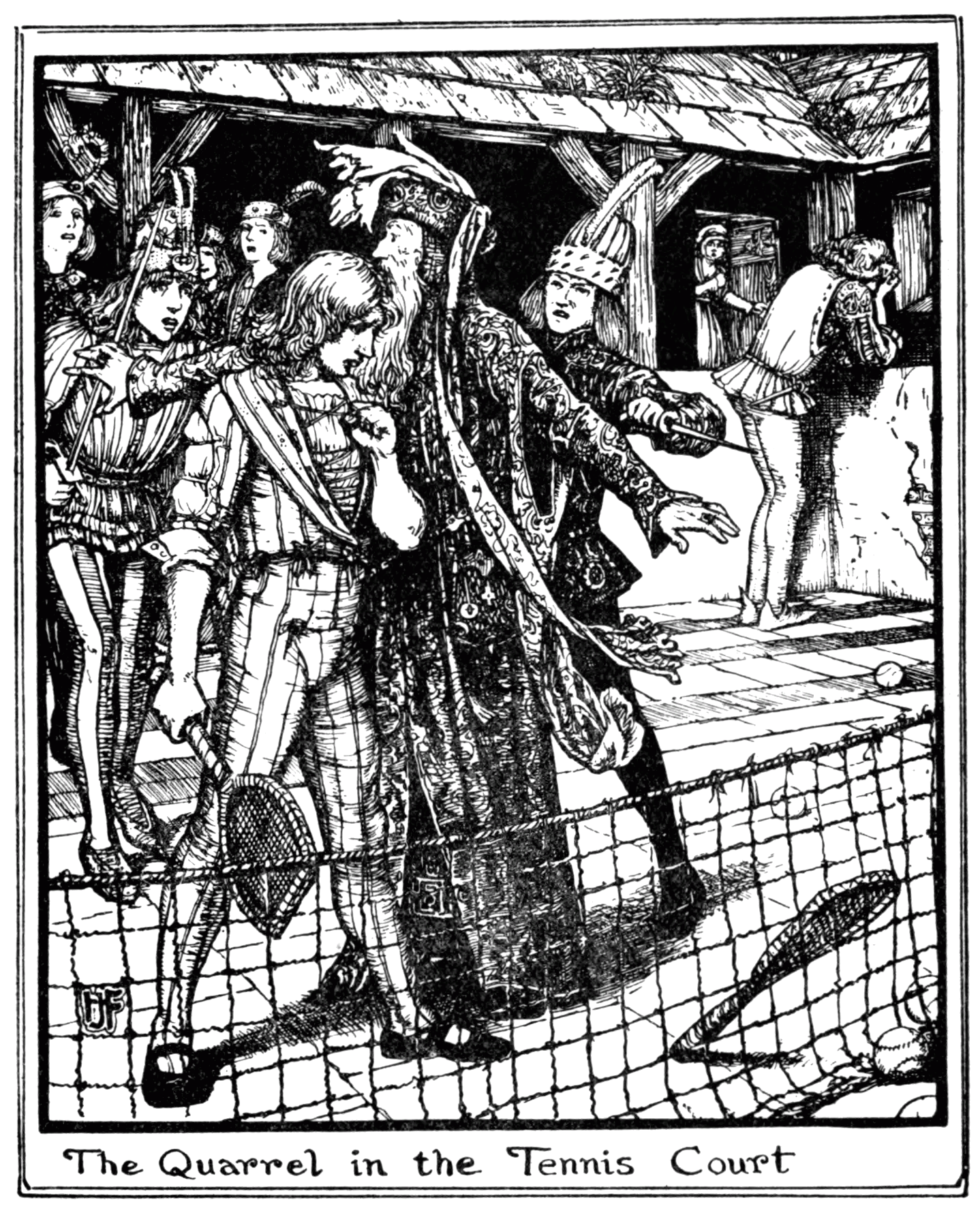

The king was displeased with the prince's cowardice, but decreed that the young man would be brought to court for having attacked the heir to the throne, for which he was likely to die. He let him go wherever he wished in the city, under guard, for the fourteen days before his case was heard.

The young man tried to get advice, but no one could advise him on how to escape, because he had struck the heir to the throne. An old woman told him she could save him if he would marry her. He rejected her offer, but on consideration, chased after her and agreed. She had him swear before a priest to marry her and then told him what to say.

In court, the young man tells the king that the queen had, while he was away, taken the son of a quarryman and passed him off as her own son. Then, after her death, the king had met a woman and married her in secret, leaving her tokens, but one day he went off to quell a rebellion and while he was gone, his bride vanished. The young man could now tell him that his chamberlain, the bride's father, had recognized the tokens and vowed that the king would not have her until he was willing to own her as his queen. The young man had been born to her in secret. Now he had the tokens to show his true birth.

The king owned him as his son. The true prince told his father how he had learned the truth and admitted he did not want to marry the old woman because she was old, and his father had not chosen her for him. The king insisted that he must keep his promise, and the wedding was held. The prince tried to hunt and forget his old wife, but one day, in the night, he heard a noise and thought it was robbers. It proved to be a young and beautiful woman, who told him that she was his wife and a princess. A wicked fairy had cursed her to that form. A wizard had managed to have the spell break if a prince agreed to marry her as she was before her fifteenth birthday; then, as her fifteenth birthday approached, the wizard had discovered him and told her what she needed to know to save him.

== See also ==
- The Marriage of Sir Gawain
