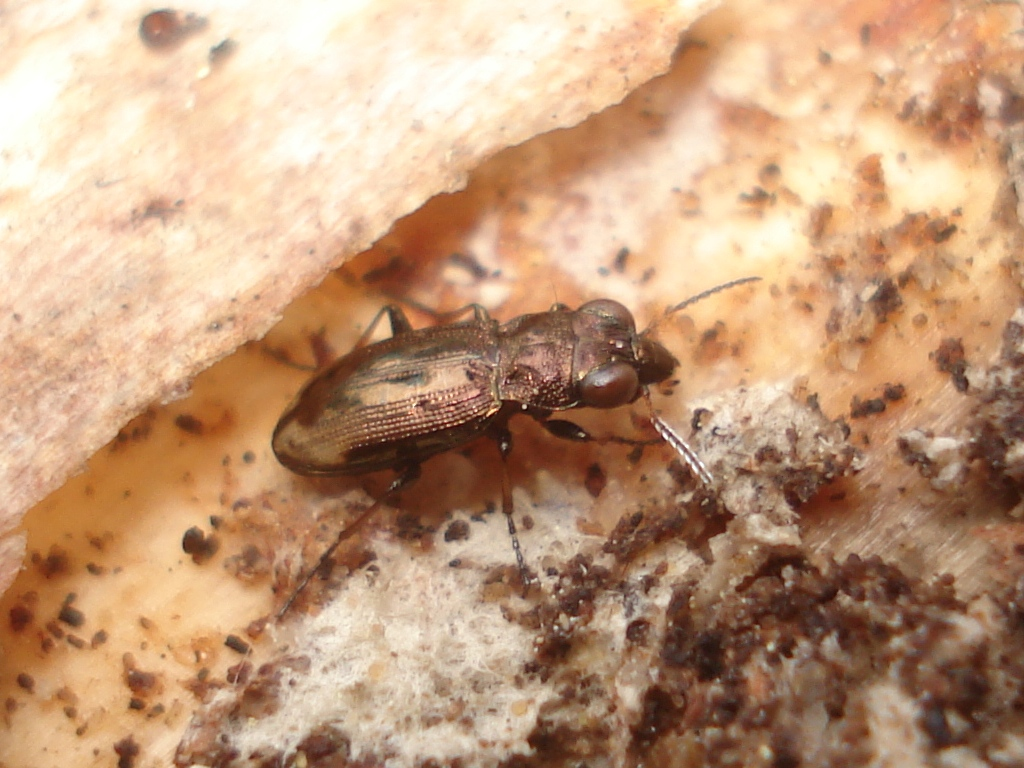

Scientific classification
- Kingdom: Animalia
- Phylum: Arthropoda
- Clade: Pancrustacea
- Class: Insecta
- Order: Coleoptera
- Suborder: Adephaga
- Family: Carabidae
- Genus: Notiophilus
- Species: N. substriatus

Binomial name
- Notiophilus substriatus G. R. Waterhouse, 1833

Synonyms
- Notiophilus coeruleotinctus Rüschkamp, 1927; Notiophilus pueli Louvet, 1925; Notiophilus subopacus Chaudoir, 1852; Notiophilus puncticollis Küster, 1848

= Notiophilus substriatus =

Species of beetle

Notiophilus substriatus is a species of ground beetle native to Europe (Ireland, Great Britain, France, Belgium, Netherlands, Germany, Switzerland, Austria, Hungary, Ukraine, Portugal, Spain, Italy, Slovenia Croatia, Bosnia-Herzegovina, former Yugoslavia, North Macedonia, Albania, Greece, Bulgaria, Morocco, Turkey).
