= Castle Hewen =

Romano-British castle in Cumbria, England

Coordinates: 54.80864°N 2.80215°W

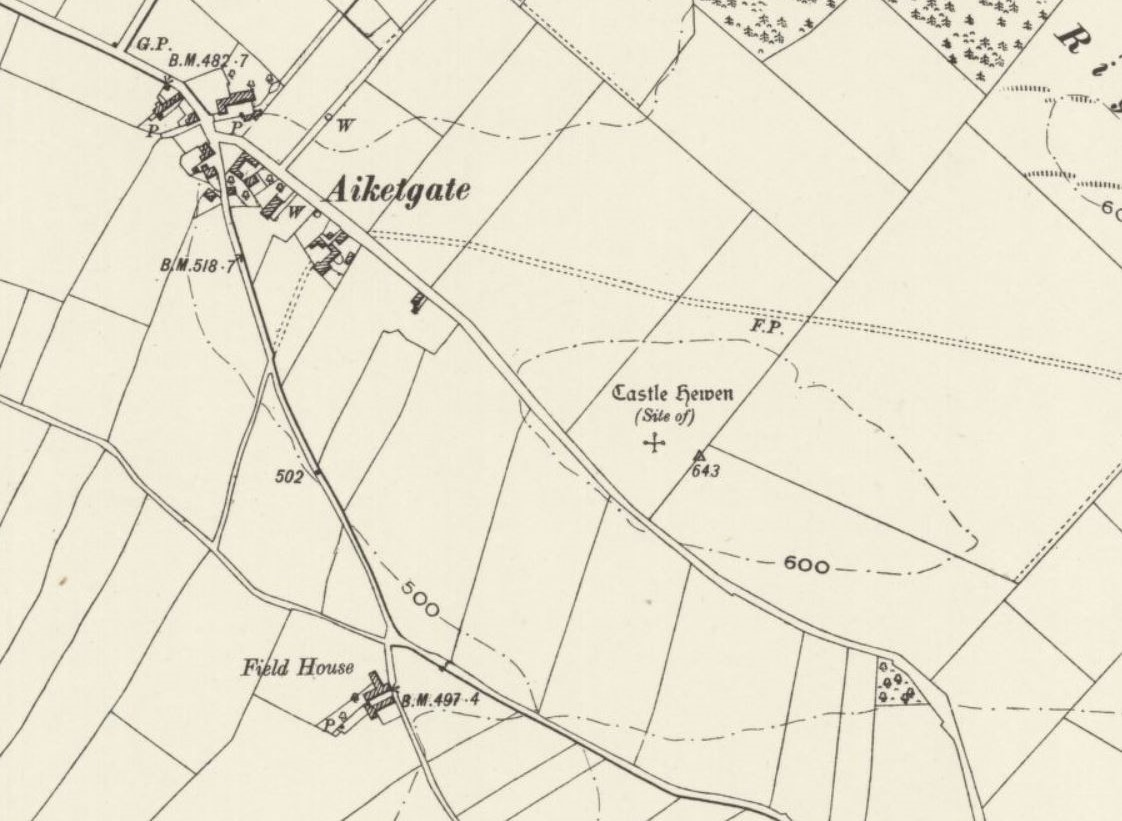
1901 Ordnance Survey map showing the location of Castle Hewen

Castle Hewen (also recorded as Castlewen; Castle Luen; Castellewyn; Castellewyne; Castlehewings; Castle-Ewaine and Castle Lewen) was a Romano-British castle near High Hesket, in the civil parish of Hesket, in the Westmorland and Furness district, in the county of Cumbria, England. It overlooked the now-drained Tarn Wadling, and was supposedly occupied by Owain mab Urien. All that remain, as at 2023, are earthworks.

== Location ==
Castle Hewen was situated on a ridge near Aiketgate, in the civil parish of Hesket, in the Eden district of Cumbria, England. It is located to the north-east of Tarn Wadling and west of the River Eden. The castle was within the boundaries of Inglewood Forest, a royal forest.

== History ==
The castle was thought to be medieval in origin, although it was reported in 1553 as already being ruined. Excavations of the site in 1794 showed the foundations were 8 feet (2.4 m) thick. The sub-surface remains of two buildings were found, one with the dimensions 233 by 147 feet (71 m × 45 m) and one measuring 49 by 49 feet (15 m × 15 m). Also located were outer defences; these took the form of a circular stone barrier, a ditch and breastwork.

The site of the castle was excavated in 1978–1979, which unearthed Romano-British artefacts. Evidence was found of two Iron Age roundhouses and Roman rectangular buildings.

The site has been used as farmland and has been extensively ploughed. As at 2023 the only visible remains are described by Historic England as "indistinct earthworks ... visible on air photos and lidar imagery".

== Folklore and literature ==
The castle was traditionally considered to be one of the strongholds of Owain mab Urien, who inherited the Kingdom of Rheged. In Arthurian legend Owain was the basis for Sir Ywain, one of the Knights of the Round Table. The castle also appears in Arthurian literature as the stronghold of Sir Gawain.
