= Notiophilus directus =

Scientific classification
- Kingdom: Animalia
- Phylum: Arthropoda
- Clade: Pancrustacea
- Class: Insecta
- Order: Coleoptera
- Suborder: Adephaga
- Family: Carabidae
- Genus: Notiophilus
- Species: N. directus

Binomial name
- Notiophilus directus Casey, 1920

Synonyms
- Notiophilus lanei Hatch, 1949

Species of beetle

Notiophilus directus, the straight big-eyed beetle, is a species of ground beetle in the family Carabidae. It is found in North America (Alberta, British Columbia, Arizona, California, Colorado, Idaho, Montana, New Mexico, Oregon, Utah, Washington, Wyoming), where it inhabits moraines or areas near brooks and lakes.

Adults are wing-dimorphic, with some being macropterous and others brachypterous.
