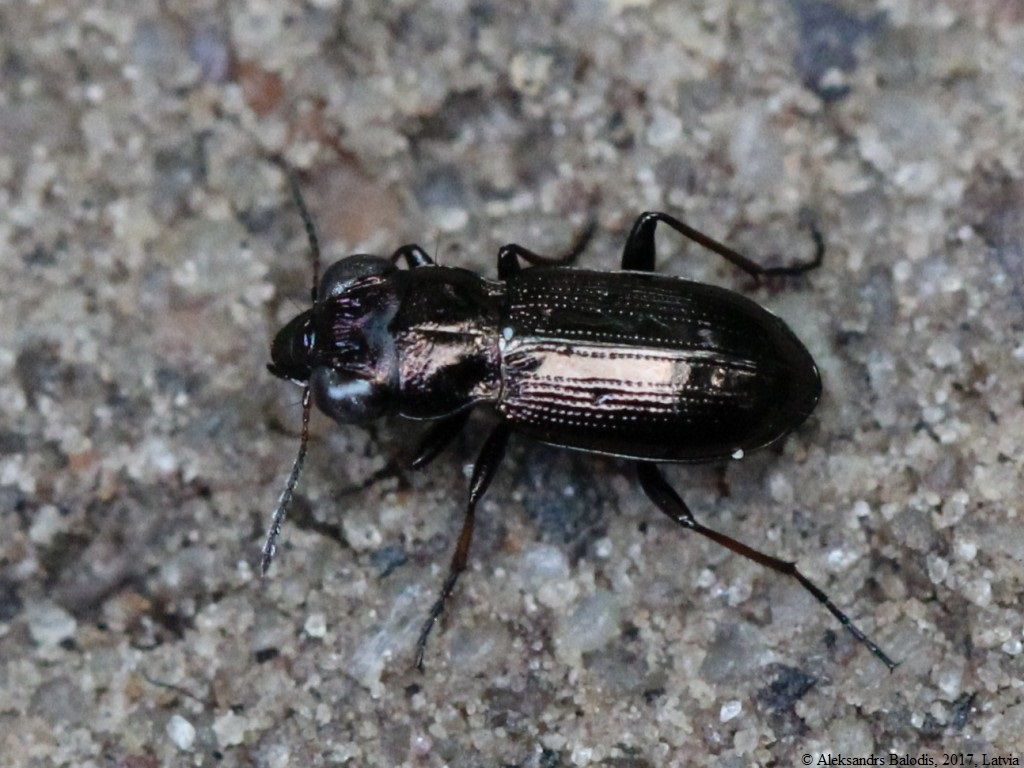

Scientific classification
- Kingdom: Animalia
- Phylum: Arthropoda
- Clade: Pancrustacea
- Class: Insecta
- Order: Coleoptera
- Suborder: Adephaga
- Family: Carabidae
- Genus: Notiophilus
- Species: N. germinyi

Binomial name
- Notiophilus germinyi Fauvel, 1863

Synonyms
- Notiophilus stipraisi Barsevskis, 1993; Notiophilus erebius Pater, 1939; Notiophilus unicolor Pater, 1939; Notiophilus veneti Pater, 1939; Notiophilus hypocrita Putzeys, 1866

= Notiophilus germinyi =

Species of beetle

Notiophilus germinyi is a species of ground beetle found in Europe and Asia (Ireland, Great Britain, Denmark, Norway, Sweden, Finland, France, Belgium, Netherlands, Germany, Switzerland, Austria, Czechia, Slovakia, Hungary, Poland, Estonia, Latvia, Lithuania, Belarus, Spain, Italy, Slovenia, Croatia, Bosnia-Herzegovina, former Yugoslavia, North Macedonia, Albania, Bulgaria, Moldova, Turkey, Azerbaijan, Kazakhstan, China, Russia).
