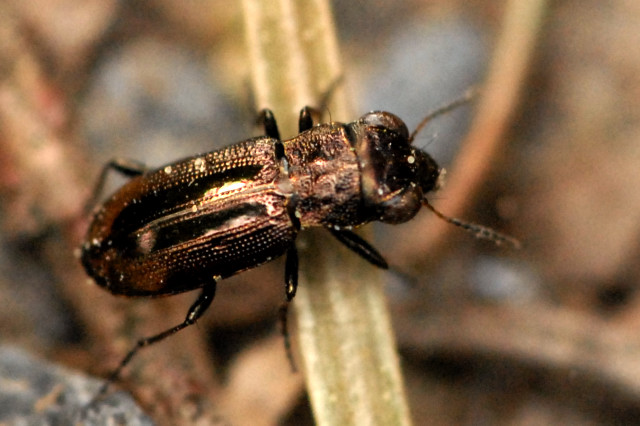

Scientific classification
- Kingdom: Animalia
- Phylum: Arthropoda
- Clade: Pancrustacea
- Class: Insecta
- Order: Coleoptera
- Suborder: Adephaga
- Family: Carabidae
- Genus: Notiophilus
- Species: N. biguttatus

Binomial name
- Notiophilus biguttatus (Fabricius, 1779)

Synonyms
- Elaphrus biguttatus Fabricius, 1779; Notiophilus coerulescens Depoli, 1929; Notiophilus pseudolateralis Louvet, 1925; Notiophilus pseudoquadripunctatus Everts, 1918; Notiophilus melanophthalmus Slosser-Klekovski, 1877; Notiophilus lateralis Motschulsky, 1864; Notiophilus latus G.R.Waterhouse, 1833; Notiophilus nitidus G.R.Waterhouse, 1833; Notiophilus striatus G.R.Waterhouse, 1833; Elaphrus semipunctatus Duftschmid, 1812; Dermestes aquaticus Geoffroy in Fourcroy, 1785

= Notiophilus biguttatus =

Species of beetle

Notiophilus biguttatus, the spotted big-eyed beetle, is a species of ground beetle native to the Palearctic. It was first described by Johan Christian Fabricius in 1779. Sometimes referred to as the Common springtail stalker

In Europe, the species is found in Austria, Belarus, Belgium, Bosnia and Herzegovina, Bulgaria, Corsica, Croatia, Cyprus, the Czech Republic, mainland Denmark, Estonia, the Faroe Islands, Finland, mainland France, Germany, Great Britain and the Isle of Man, Hungary, Iceland, the Republic of Ireland, mainland Italy, Kaliningrad, Latvia, Liechtenstein, Lithuania, Luxembourg, Moldova, Northern Ireland, North Macedonia, mainland Norway, Poland, mainland Portugal, Russia, Sardinia, Sicily, Slovakia, Slovenia, mainland Spain, Sweden, Switzerland, the Netherlands, Ukraine and Yugoslavia.

It has also been introduced to North America with Canadian records for both the Atlantic and Pacific coasts: Nova Scotia, Newfoundland, New Brunswick and British Columbia.
