= Notiophilus chihuahuae =

Scientific classification
- Kingdom: Animalia
- Phylum: Arthropoda
- Class: Insecta
- Order: Coleoptera
- Suborder: Adephaga
- Family: Carabidae
- Genus: Notiophilus
- Species: N. chihuahuae

Binomial name
- Notiophilus chihuahuae Casey, 1913

Species of beetle

Notiophilus chihuahuae is a species of beetle of the Carabidae family. This species is found in Mexico (Chihuahua, Durango, Sinaloa, Sonora), where it inhabits oak/pine and oak/pine/fir forests.

Adults are at least partly brachypterous.
