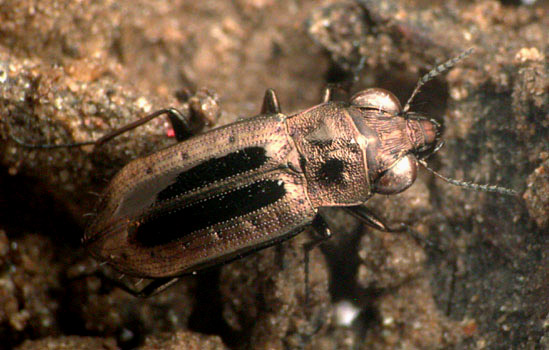

Scientific classification
- Domain: Eukaryota
- Kingdom: Animalia
- Phylum: Arthropoda
- Class: Insecta
- Order: Coleoptera
- Suborder: Adephaga
- Family: Carabidae
- Genus: Notiophilus
- Species: N. semiopacus

Binomial name
- Notiophilus semiopacus Eschscholtz, 1833

= Notiophilus semiopacus =

Species of beetle

Notiophilus semiopacus, the semiopaque big-eyed beetle, is a species of ground beetle in the family Carabidae. It is found in Central America (Mexico) and North America (Arizona, California), where it is found on ridges, near snowfields, at foothill canyons (along streams), in parks, as well as on sea beaches in California.

Adults are mostly diurnal and wing-dimorphic, with some adults being brachypterous and other macropterous.
