= Notiophilus novemstriatus =

Scientific classification
- Kingdom: Animalia
- Phylum: Arthropoda
- Class: Insecta
- Order: Coleoptera
- Suborder: Adephaga
- Family: Carabidae
- Genus: Notiophilus
- Species: N. novemstriatus

Binomial name
- Notiophilus novemstriatus LeConte, 1847

Synonyms
- Notiophilus cribrilaterus Motschulsky, 1864

Species of beetle

Notiophilus novemstriatus, the nine-lined big-eyed beetle, is a species of ground beetle in the family Carabidae. It is found in North America, occurring throughout the eastern U.S. states and as far west as Arizona. Approximately 4.5mm long, it is a brassy black color, with a wide head and large eyes.
