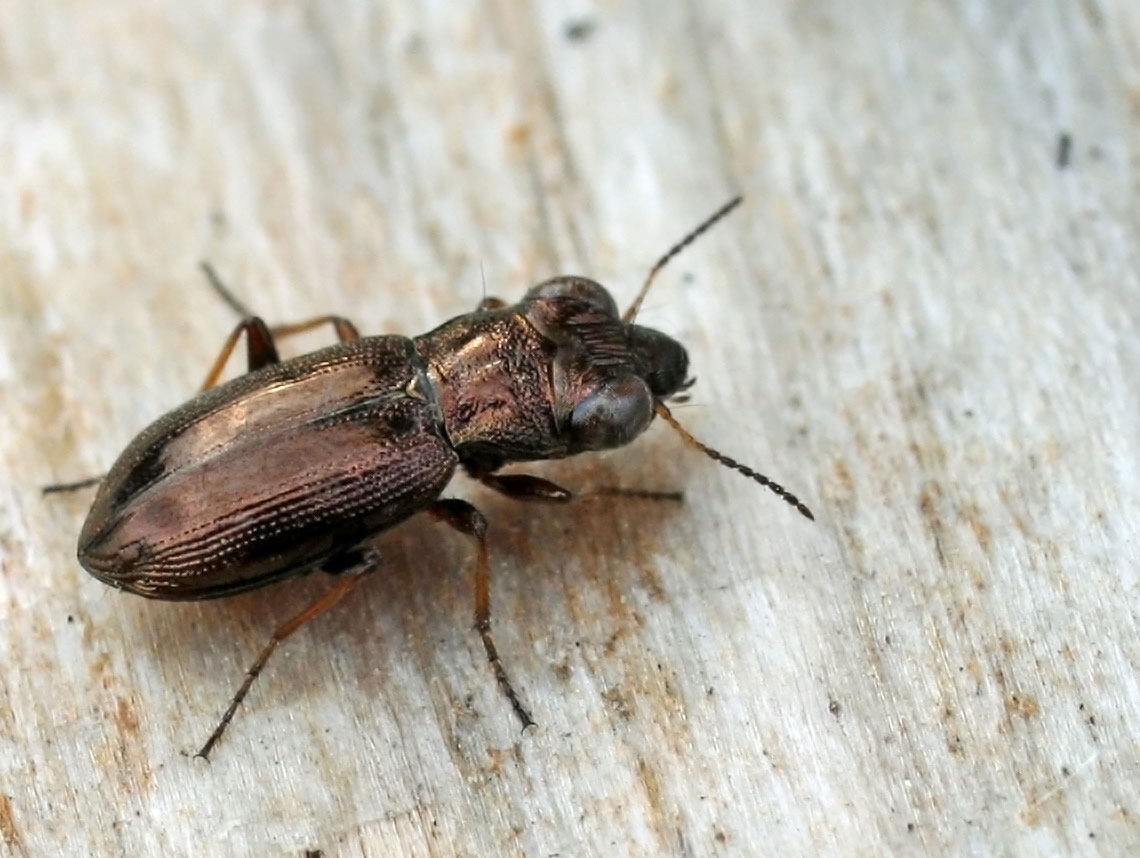
- Notiophilus palustris

Scientific classification
- Domain: Eukaryota
- Kingdom: Animalia
- Phylum: Arthropoda
- Class: Insecta
- Order: Coleoptera
- Suborder: Adephaga
- Family: Carabidae
- Genus: Notiophilus
- Species: N. palustris

Binomial name
- Notiophilus palustris (Duftschmid, 1812)

Synonyms
- Elaphrus palustris Duftschmid, 1812; Notiophilus decemstriatus Roubal, 1948; Notiophilus impunctatus Pulpan, 1948; Notiophilus mlynari Pulpan, 1948; Notiophilus atavus Friederichs, 1903; Notiophilus hirticollis Chaudoir, 1882; Notiophilus melancholicus Dalla Torre, 1877; Notiophilus brevis G.R.Waterhouse, 1833; Notiophilus davisii G.R.Waterhouse, 1833; Notiophilus latior G.R.Waterhouse, 1833; Notiophilus newmanni G.R.Waterhouse, 1833; Notiophilus nitidulus G.R.Waterhouse, 1833; Notiophilus parallelus G.R.Waterhouse, 1833; Notiophilus tibialis G.R.Waterhouse, 1833

= Notiophilus palustris =

Species of beetle

Notiophilus palustris, the marsh big-eyed beetle, is a species of ground beetle in the genus Notiophilus native to the Palearctic and the Nearctic.

In Europe, it is found in Austria, Belarus, Belgium, Bosnia and Herzegovina, Great Britain including the Isle of Man, Bulgaria, the Czech Republic, mainland Denmark, Estonia, Finland, mainland France, Germany, Hungary, the mainland Italy, Kaliningrad, Latvia, Liechtenstein, Lithuania, Luxembourg, Moldova, North Macedonia, mainland Norway, Poland, Russia, Slovakia, Slovenia, mainland Spain, Sweden, Switzerland, the Netherlands, Ukraine and Yugoslavia.
