= Notiophilus simulator =

Scientific classification
- Domain: Eukaryota
- Kingdom: Animalia
- Phylum: Arthropoda
- Class: Insecta
- Order: Coleoptera
- Suborder: Adephaga
- Family: Carabidae
- Genus: Notiophilus
- Species: N. simulator

Binomial name
- Notiophilus simulator Fall, 1906

Synonyms
- Notiophilus evanescens Casey, 1913

Species of beetle

Notiophilus simulator, Fall's big-eyed beetle, is a species of ground beetle in the family Carabidae. It is found in North America. It inhabits uplands to mountainous areas.

Adults are wing-dimorphic, with some being brachypterous, while others are macropterous.
