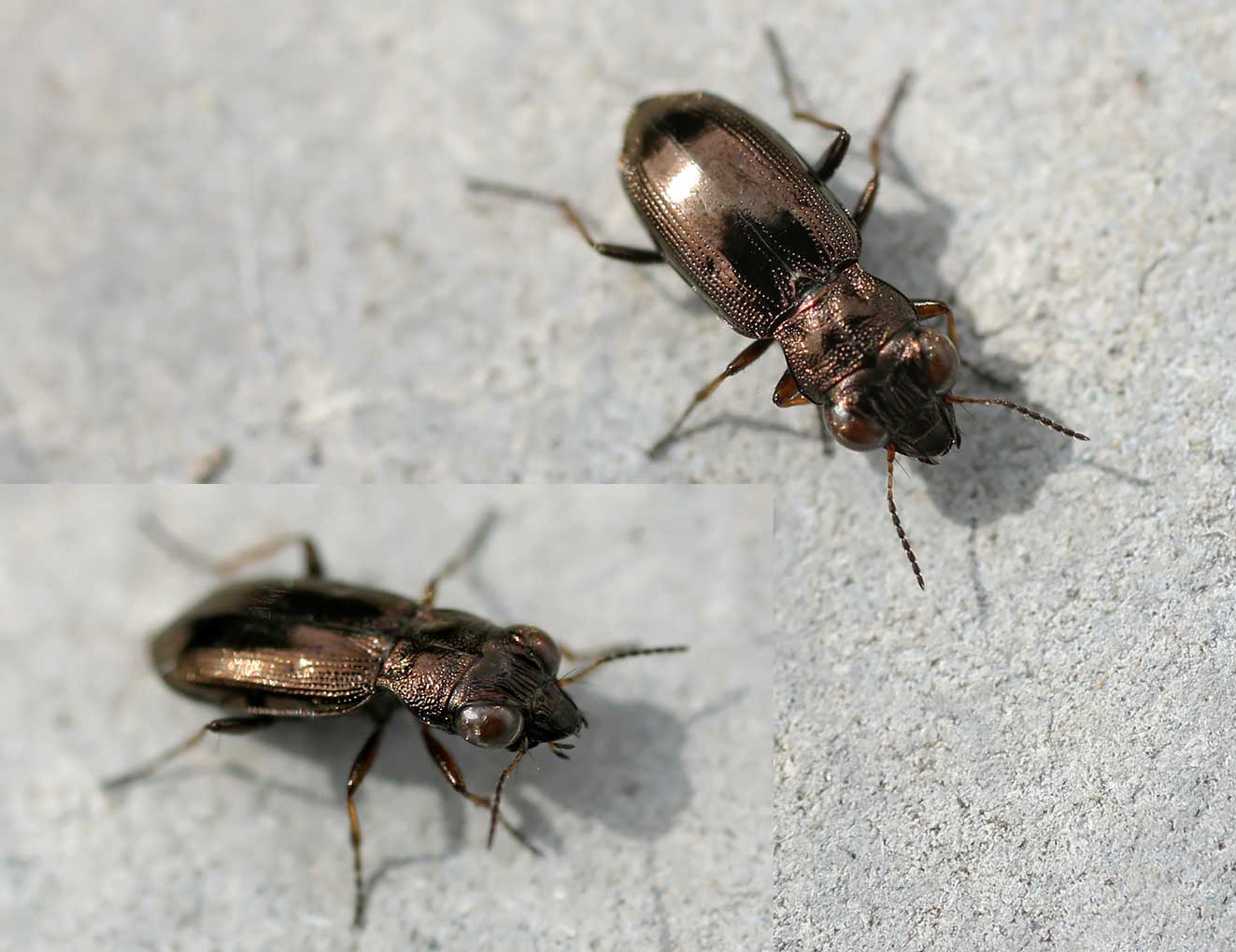
- Notiophilus rufipes

Scientific classification
- Domain: Eukaryota
- Kingdom: Animalia
- Phylum: Arthropoda
- Class: Insecta
- Order: Coleoptera
- Suborder: Adephaga
- Family: Carabidae
- Genus: Notiophilus
- Species: N. rufipes

Binomial name
- Notiophilus rufipes Curtis, 1829

Synonyms
- Notiophilus quadrifoveatus Klynstra, 1952; Notiophilus femoralis J.L.M.Lomnicki, 1903; Notiophilus fulvipes Motschulsky, 1845; Notiophilus rufipes Chaudoir, 1844

= Notiophilus rufipes =

Species of beetle

Notiophilus rufipes, the rufus-legged big-eyed beetle, is a species of ground beetle native to the Palearctic and the Near East. It is an introduced species in the United States, where it has been recorded from Georgia. Its habitat consists of mixed forests, where it may be found at the forest edges, as well as in vine and fruit tree orchards.
