= Loathly lady =

Archetypal woman who transforms from ugly to beautiful

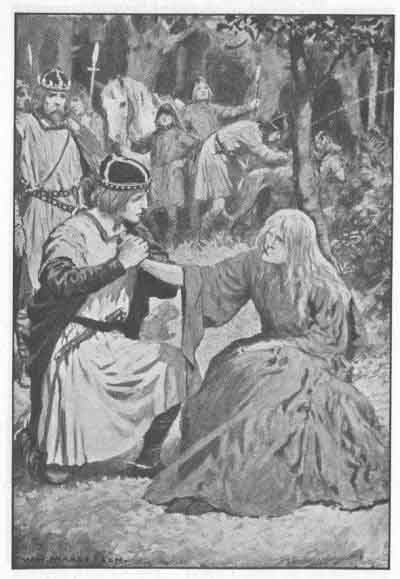
"Lady, I will be a true and loyal husband." Gawain and the loathly lady in W. H. Margetson's illustration for Maud Isabel Ebbutt's Hero-Myths and Legends of the British Race (1910)

The loathly lady (Welsh: dynes gas, Motif D732 in Stith Thompson's motif index), is a tale type commonly used in medieval literature, most famously in Geoffrey Chaucer's The Wife of Bath's Tale. The motif is that of a woman who appears unattractive (ugly, loathly) but undergoes a transformation upon being approached by a man in spite of her unattractiveness, becoming extremely desirable. It is then revealed that her ugliness was the result of a curse which was broken by the hero's action.

== Irish legend ==
The loathly lady can be found in The Adventures of the Sons of Eochaid Mugmedon, in which Niall of the Nine Hostages proves himself the rightful High King of Ireland by embracing her, because she turns out to personify the sovereignty of the territory (and is therefore sometimes referred in scholarship as a 'sovereignty goddess'). The motif can also be found in stories of the earlier high kings Lugaid Loígde and Conn of the Hundred Battles.

=== Diarmuid ===
In the Fenian Cycle of Irish mythology, Diarmuid Ua Duibhne was one of the most famous members of the Fianna. One freezing winter's night, the Loathly Lady brazenly entered the Fianna lodge, where the warriors had just gone to bed after a hunting expedition. Drenched to the bone, her sodden hair was snarled and knotted. Desperate for warmth and shelter, she knelt beside each warrior and demanded a blanket, beginning with their leader Fionn. Despite her rants and temper tantrums, the tired men only rolled over and ignored her in the hope that she would leave. Only young Diarmuid, whose bed was nearest to the fireplace, took pity on the wretched woman, giving her his bed and blanket. The Loathly Lady noticed Diarmuid's love spot and said that she had wandered the world alone for 7 years. Diarmuid reassured her and told her she could sleep all night and that he would protect her. Towards dawn, he became aware that she had become a beautiful young woman.

The next day, the Loathly Lady rewarded Diarmuid's kindness by offering him his greatest wish—a house overlooking the sea. Overjoyed, Diarmuid asked the woman to live with him. She agreed on one condition: He must promise never to mention how ugly she looked on the night they met. After 3 days together, Diarmuid grew restless. The Loathly Lady offered to watch his greyhound and her new pups while he went hunting. On three occasions, Diarmuid's friends, envious of his good luck, visited the lady and asked for one of the new pups. Each time, she honoured the request. Each time, Diarmuid was angry and asked her how she could repay him so meanly when he overlooked her ugliness the first night they met. On the third mention of that which he had promised never to speak of, the Loathly Lady and the house disappeared, and his beloved greyhound died.

Realizing that his ungratefulness has caused him to lose everything he valued, Diarmuid set out to find his lady. He used an enchanted ship to cross a stormy sea. Arriving in the Otherworld, he searched for the lady through green meadows filled with brightly coloured horses and silver trees. Three times he spied a drop of ruby-red blood and gathered each drop into his handkerchief. When a stranger revealed that the King's gravely ill daughter had just returned after 7 years, Diarmuid realised it must be his lady. Rushing to her side, he discovered she was dying. The 3 drops of blood Diarmuid collected were from her heart, spilled each time she thought of Diarmuid. The only cure was a cup of healing water from the Plain of Wonder, guarded by a jealous king and his army. Diarmuid vowed to bring back the cup.

His quest for the healing cup nearly ended at an impassable river. Diarmuid was stumped until the Red Man of All Knowledge, who had red hair and eyes like glowing coals, helped him cross the river and then guided him to the king of the healing cup's castle. Once there, Diarmuid issued a challenge and in response the king first sent out one thousand six hundred fighting men, then one thousand eight hundred. Diarmuid single-handedly slew them all. Impressed, the king gave him the cup of healing. On the return trip, the Red Man advised Diarmuid on how to heal his lady. He also warned the young hero that when her sickness ended, Diarmuid's love for her would end as well. Diarmuid refused to believe the prophecy, but indeed, it came true. The lady sadly understood that Diarmuid's love for her had died. She couldn't live in his world any more than he could live in hers. Diarmuid boarded an enchanted ship to return to the Fianna, where he was greeted by his friends and his greyhound, which the lady had returned to life as her final gift to him.

== Arthurian/British legend ==
In her capacity as a quest-bringer, the loathly lady can be found in the literature of the Holy Grail, including Chrétien de Troyes' Perceval, the Story of the Grail, Wolfram von Eschenbach's Parzival, and the Welsh Romance Peredur son of Efrawg associated with the Mabinogion.

The best known treatment is in "The Wife of Bath's Tale", in which a knight, told that he can choose whether his bride is to be ugly yet faithful, or beautiful yet false, frees the lady from the form entirely by allowing her to choose for herself. A variation on this story is attached to Sir Gawain in the related romances The Wedding of Sir Gawain and Dame Ragnelle and The Marriage of Sir Gawain.

Another version of the motif is the Child ballad "King Henry". In this ballad, the king must appease the loathly lady as she demands increasing tribute from him. The next morning, he is surprised as she transforms into a beautiful woman.

== Norse tradition ==
The loathly lady also appears in the Old Norse Hrólfr Kraki's saga where Hróarr's brother Helgi was visited one Yule by an ugly being while he was in his hunting house. No person in the entire kingdom allowed the being to enter the house, except Helgi. Later, the thing asked to sleep in his bed. Unwillingly he agreed, and as the thing got into the bed, it turned into an elvish woman, who was clad in silk and who was the most beautiful woman he had ever seen. He raped her, and made her pregnant with a daughter named Skuld. Helgi forgot the woman and a couple of days after the date had passed, he was visited by the woman, who had Skuld in her arms. The daughter would later marry Hjörvarðr, Hrólfr Kraki's killer. This tradition is also present in the Northumbrian tale The Laidly Worm of Spindleston Heugh. Similar to this tale, is that of Hjálmþés saga ok Ölvis.

== "The Wife of Bath's Tale" ==
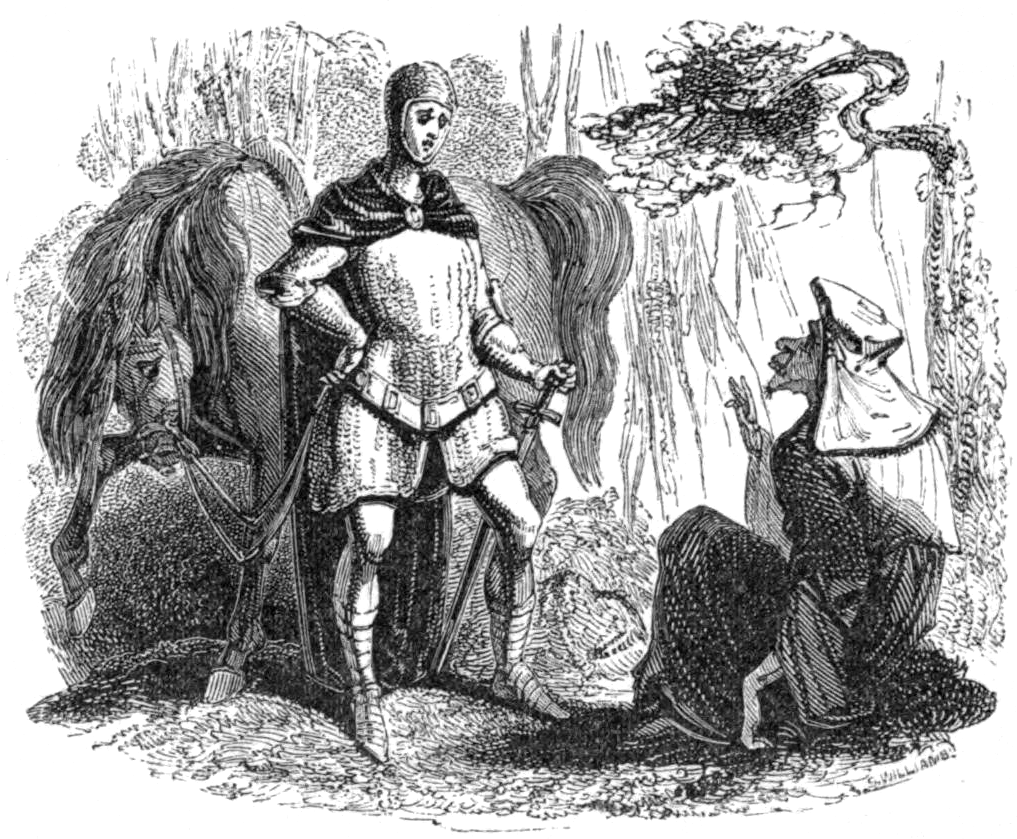
The Knight meeting the Loathly Lady in "The Wife of Bath's Tale"

The tale told by The Wife of Bath in Geoffrey Chaucer's The Canterbury Tales is one of the most prominent examples of the loathly lady motif. The story begins during the rule of King Arthur over the Isle of Britain. According to the Wife, it was a magical time, unlike, she alleges, the present day in which lecherous friars like the one in the pilgrims' company lurk in the woods and often sexually assault women, bringing shame upon them without impregnating them (ll. 874-881). The plot of the story begins when a Knight of King Arthur's court rapes a young woman when he is overpowered by his lust for her. The King and his court then come to the conclusion that decapitation is a punishment fit for the crime at hand; however, the decision is intercepted by the Queen and women of the court before it can be executed. The women persuade the King to grant him another chance on one condition. They propose that if the Knight can find what women desire most from their partners and report it back to them in time, then the Knight will keep his head. King Arthur then proceeds to accept the women's punishment and grants the knight this second chance. The Knight quickly seizes this opportunity and sets out on a journey that becomes more difficult than he first anticipated. Early in his quest the Knight comes to realize that each woman he questions seems to give him a different answer than the last. As the Knight's time begins to run out, he comes across a group of young women dancing and sets out to question them as well. But as the Knight draws near, to his dismay, the group vanishes and turns into a loathly old woman (a hag), who offers to help him with his dilemma. The old woman joins the Knight on his quest back and aids him in giving the answer to the women of the court. Together, the Knight and the Loathly Lady tell the women of the court that women desire sovereignty the most in their love life: women want to be treated as equal partners in their love relationships. The Wife of Bath continues with her tale and says that the loathly woman asks the knight to marry her in return for helping him. The knight submits to the hag's request although he pleads for her to take his material wealth instead. They marry and consummate the marriage that very night. When the old woman realizes how unhappy the Knight is she asks him why he is so sorrowful and he tells her that he is unhappy to have married such an unattractive wife. The wife responds to this comment by giving the Knight a choice: either he can have an old, unattractive, yet loyal wife or a young and beautiful wife that will be unfaithful to him. The knight decides to let his wife choose, and she transforms instead into a wife both beautiful and loyal, because he gave her the sovereignty to choose.

== See also ==
- "Beauty and the Beast"
- Hercules at the crossroads
- King Henry (song)
- Perchta
- Pig-faced women
- Princess Fiona
- Sheela na gig
- "The Frog Prince"
- Women in the Middle Ages

== Bibliography ==
- Chaucer, Geoffrey. The Canterbury Tales, by Geoffrey Chaucer. London, J. Cape and the Medicine Society, 1928.
- Claridge, Alexandra. “‘of Bath’: A Middle English Idiomatic Epithet”. Notes and Queries 67:3 (Sept. 2020), 338–340.
- Gould, Karen and Jane L. Ball. "The Canterbury Tales by Geoffrey Chaucer." Salem Press Encyclopedia of Literature, January.
- Friedrich Wolfzettel (1995). Geschlechterrollen im mittelalterlichen Artusroman. Rodopi. ISBN 978-90-5183-635-6.
- John Matthews (1999). Sir Gawain: knight of the goddess. Turtleback Books. ISBN 978-0-8085-9690-5.
- S. Eisner (1957). Tale of Wonder a Source Study for the Wife of Bath. Ayer Publishing. ISBN 978-0-8337-1029-1.
- Passmore, S. Elizabeth and Susan Carter. The English "Loathly Lady" Tales : Boundaries, Traditions, Motifs. Kalamazoo, Mich. : Medieval Institute Publications, c2007. ISBN 978-1580441230
- Peter G. Beidler; Elizabeth M. Biebel; Geoffrey Chaucer (1998). Chaucer's Wife of Bath's prologue and tale: an annotated bibliography. University of Toronto Press. ISBN 978-0-8020-4366-5.
- S. Elizabeth Passmore; Susan Carter (2007). The English "Loathly Lady" tales: boundaries, traditions, motifs. Medieval Institute Publications. ISBN 978-1-58044-123-0.
