= The Awntyrs off Arthure =

Middle English Arthurian romance

The Awntyrs off Arthure at the Terne Wathelyne (The Adventures of Arthur at Tarn Wadling) is an Arthurian romance of 702 lines written in Middle English alliterative verse. Despite its title, it centres on the deeds of Sir Gawain. The poem, thought to have been composed in Cumberland in the late 14th or early 15th century, survives in four different manuscripts from widely separated areas of England.

== Synopsis ==
Although the Awntyrs off Arthure is in some respects typical of the romances featuring Gawain, it has peculiarities of structure and theme that set it apart. It begins, conventionally enough, with Arthur's court riding out to a hunt.

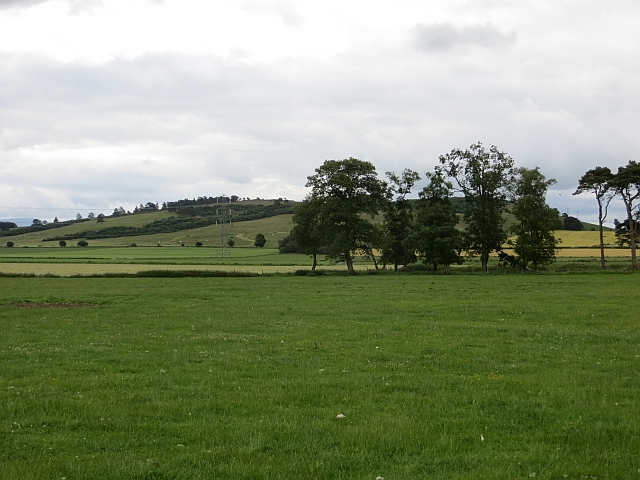
Tarn Wadling in Hesket, Cumberland, the Terne Wathelyne of the poem. The lake, once famous for its carp, was largely drained in the 1850s, and had disappeared by the 1940s

At the lake Tarn Wadling, Gawain and Guinevere ("Gaynour") encounter a hideous and vividly-described ghost, who reveals that she is Guinevere's mother, condemned to suffer for the sins of adultery and pride that she committed while alive. In response to Gawain and Guinevere's questions, she advises them to live morally and to "have pité on the poer [...] Sithen charité is chef" ("have pity on the poor [...] Because charity is paramount"), and prophesizes that the Round Table will ultimately be destroyed by Mordred. She ends by requesting that masses are said for her soul.

The second half of the poem covers a different story: a knight, Sir Galeron of Galloway, claims that King Arthur and Gawain have false possession of his lands, and demands to settle the issue through honourable combat ("I wol fight on a felde - thereto I make feith") Gawain, who takes up the challenge, has the upper hand, and seems about to kill Galeron; but Galeron's lady and Guinevere intervene, and Arthur calls a halt to the fight. An amicable settlement is made of the land ownership; Galeron marries his lady, and becomes a knight of the Round Table. In the final stanza, Guinevere arranges masses for her mother's soul, and bells are rung throughout Britain (signifying public celebration, and the passage of a soul from Purgatory), bringing the narrative full circle in a "happy ending".

== Textual criticism ==
The two parts of the poem were long thought to be a conflation of two entirely separate texts, especially as the chivalric concerns of the second half seem to directly contradict the message of humility contained in the first. Medievalist Ralph Hanna, who edited the text, felt that the first episode had been adapted by a second, less technically assured author, who added the Galeron section and ended with the original final stanza of the first poem. However, following the work of A. C. Spearing — who compared its structure to that of a diptych — the Awntyrs is now commonly seen as a unified work by a single poet, where the themes of the first half are reflected in the second. For example, Carl Grey Martin notes that both parts include graphic depictions of nobles in states of physical distress, offering the possibility of reading Gawain's fight with Galeron as a kind of chivalric equivalent to the ghost's spiritual purgation.

== Sources ==
The first episode, featuring characters who, while on a hunt, are plunged into darkness before meeting a ghost, has strong thematic similarities to another stanzaic alliterative poem, The Three Dead Kings, and seems to be derived from a popular legend of Saint Gregory.

== Verse form ==
The Awntyrs off Arthure is written in a form of alliterative verse combining the usual four-stress alliterative line with a rhyme ABABABABCDDDC in a thirteen-line stanza; the density of alliteration is higher than in any other Middle English poem, with over half of its lines containing four alliterating stresses rather than the customary three. The style can be illustrated by the opening stanza:

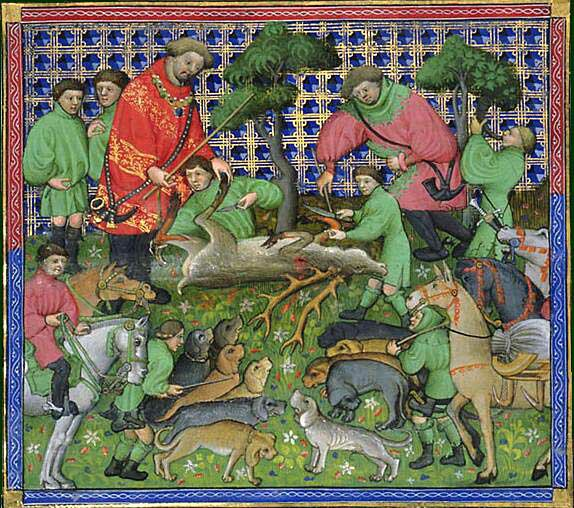
Early 15th century deer hunt, from a French manuscript. The poem opens with a deer hunt in "the depe delles" of Inglewood Forest.

In the tyme of Arthur an aunter bytydde,
By the Turne Wathelan, as the boke telles,
Whan he to Carlele was comen, that conquerour kydde,
With dukes and dussiperes that with the dere dwelles.
To hunte at the herdes that longe had ben hydde,
On a day thei hem dight to the depe delles,
To fall of the femailes in forest were frydde,
Fayre by the fermesones in frithes and felles.
Thus to wode arn thei went, the wlonkest in wedes,
Bothe the Kyng and the Quene,
And al the doughti bydene.
Sir Gawayn, gayest on grene,
Dame Gaynour he ledes. (1–13)

Variants of the thirteen-line alliterating stanza are found in a handful of other English poems: The Four Leaves of the Truelove, The Three Dead Kings, The Pistel of Swete Susan, and a number of others.

== Composition ==
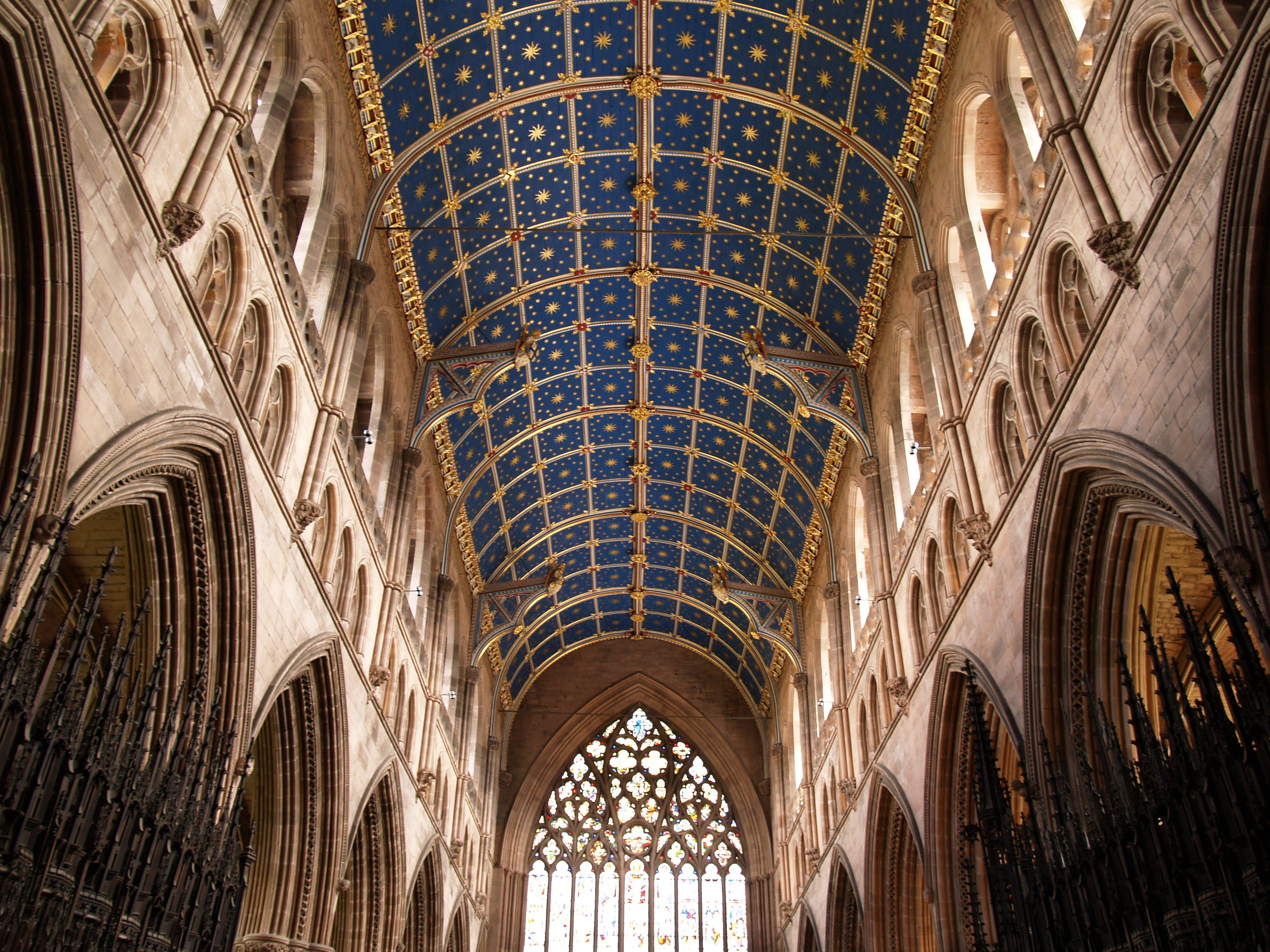
The 14th century nave of Carlisle Cathedral, once an Augustinian priory. It has been suggested that the author of the Awntyrs may have been a canon at the priory

While the identity of the poet is unknown, the English palaeographer Frederic Madden attributed it to the fifteenth century Scottish makar Clerk of Tranent whom William Dunbar refers to as the author of the Awnteris of Gawaine in his poem Lament for the Makaris. Though the manuscript copies display very different scribal dialects, there are traces of an underlying dialect of the far north-western borders of England. Given the location of Arthur's court at Carlisle, and of much of the poem's action at Tarn Wadling and in Inglewood Forest— both in Cumberland— the author was most likely an educated native of the area, perhaps a cleric. The Augustinian Canons, whose members were often involved in the production of literature, were based at Carlisle and had fishing rights at Tarn Wadling; it has been speculated that the author could have belonged to this order.

Academic Rosamund Allen has argued that a likely patron for the poem was Joan Beaufort, Countess of Westmorland, with the text composed as a dramatic entertainment for a marriage, or other important celebration, during the mid-1420s.

== Manuscripts ==
The poem is preserved in four different manuscripts, one of which is the mid-fifteenth century Lincoln Thornton Manuscript.
