= Listed buildings in St Cuthbert Without =

St Cuthbert Without is a civil parish in the Cumberland district of Cumbria, England. It contains 43 listed buildings that are recorded in the National Heritage List for England. Of these, two are listed at Grade II*, the middle of the three grades, and the others are at Grade II, the lowest grade. The parish includes the southern suburbs of Carlisle including Garlands, and the villages of Blackwell, Brisco, Carleton, and Wreay, together with the surrounding countryside. Most of the listed buildings are country houses, smaller houses and associated structures, farmhouses, and farm buildings. The other listed buildings include a church and associated structures, a former mortuary chapel, a former hospital chapel, and a well head.

== Key ==
Grade	Criteria
II*	Particularly important buildings of more than special interest
II	Buildings of national importance and special interest

== Buildings ==
Name and location	Photograph	Date	Notes	Grade
Newbiggin Hall; 54.84928°N 2.88454°W		14th century	Originally a tower house, it was almost completely encased by a new house in about 1698, and there were further additions in 1820–26. The building is in sandstone, the original rectangular tower having very think walls. The house has freestone dressings, a string course, a moulded cornice, and a slate roof. It has 2 1/2 storeys and a front of seven bays. The doorway has a moulded surround and entablature, a swan-neck pediment, and scrolled console brackets. The windows are sashes in moulded surrounds, those in the ground floor and the central window above having swan-neck pediments. The right gable is crow-stepped with pinnacles, and the left gable is plain.	II*
Garden wall, Newbiggin Hall; 54.84905°N 2.88434°W	—	Late 15th to early 16th century	The wall is in sandstone, it originated as an outbuilding wall, and was converted into a garden wall probably in the late 17th century. The former doorways and windows have been filled in. The piers at the entrance to the garden are rusticated and each has a moulded cornice and a stone ball.	II
Cottage, Town Head Farm; 54.83794°N 2.94491°W	—	Late 16th to early 17th century	The original part of the cottage has clay walls, it was encased in stone in 1689, and there were further extensions, probably in the 18th century. The roof is thatched and covered by corrugated iron. There is a single storey, six bays, and a rear outshut. The doorway has a chamfered surround and a dated lintel. Most windows are casements with chamfered surrounds, and there is one mullioned window. Inside the cottage is an inglenook and a bressumer.	II
Brisco Hall; 54.85882°N 2.90457°W	—	1610	A sandstone farmhouse with quoins and a slate roof, in two storeys and five bays. The doorway has a moulded surround and a dated and inscribed lintel. In front of it is a 20th-century gabled porch with re-used Ionic columns on square bases. The windows have chamfered mullions and surrounds, and there is a continuous hood mould on both floors.	II
Sprunston Farmhouse and barns 54.82769°N 2.93716°W	—	Late 17th century	The farmhouse and barns are in sandstone, the barns dating from the late 18th century. The house has a slate roof, two storeys, and three bays. It contains one mullioned window with a chamfered surround, the other windows being replaced by horizontally-sliding sash windows in chamfered surrounds. To the right is a former two-bay barn that contains sash windows and a 19th-century doorway, and a byre that contains plank doors and ventilation slits. At right angles to the left is a barn with a cart entrance, half-plank doors, and external steps leading to a loft door.	II
Wooden Walls; 54.85948°N 2.90595°W	—	1681	The house was extended to the left in the 18th century. It is rendered, the extension is in brick, and the house has stone dressings and a slate roof with some stone-slate. Above the doorway is an inscribed and dated lintel and a hood mould. The ground floor windows are mullioned, above the door is a small casement window, and this is flanked by flat-headed dormers. The extension contains garage doors.	II
Blackhall Wood Farmhouse and barn 54.85125°N 2.95583°W	—	1695 or before	There are two farms and a barn in red and yellow sandstone with slate roofs. The older house has a blocked doorway with a dated and inscribed lintel, and casement windows. The newer house dates from 1704, and has quoins and coped gables. There are two storeys, two bays, and a double depth span. The doorway has a moulded surround and an architrave, and the windows are sashes. The barn to the right has a door, a loft door, and ventilation slits. Its gable wall and south wall are built in river cobbles with quoins, and it contains the remains of a chamfered mullioned window.	II
Barn, Town Head Farm; 54.83776°N 2.94485°W	—	Late 17th to early 18th century	The barn has clay walls repaired in sandstone. It has a slate roof, two storeys and three bays. The doors have wooden lintels, there is a small window, and ventilation slits. (Note: Street View in March 2010 shows that the barn has been converted for residential use.)	II
The Beeches; 54.86595°N 2.89005°W	—	1706	This comprises two adjoining farmhouses and an extension, all with slate roofs, and in two storeys. The original farmhouse is in sandstone and has three bays, a stone lintel, dated and initialled, over a window converted from the doorway, and 20th-century casement windows. Behind it is a two-bay brick extension with sash windows. At right angles and facing the road is a farmhouse dating from 1830–40, in brick with quoins and decorative cast iron gutter brackets. The round-headed doorway has Tuscan columns, pilasters, an open pediment, and a fanlight. Flanking it are canted bay windows, and in the upper floor are sash windows.	II
Blackwell Farmhouse; 54.86866°N 2.93425°W	—	Early 18th century	The farmhouse is in rendered brick, and has a slate roof. There are two storeys and five bays. On the front is a 20th-century brick porch, and the windows are sashes with stone sills and keystones.	II
Outbuilding, The Cottage; 54.86600°N 2.89024°W	—	Early 18th century	Originally a house and combined barn, later used for other purposes. It is in sandstone with a slate roof, and has two storeys and five bays. The building contains a plank door with a plain surround, sash windows, a cart entrance, a blocked door with an inscribed lintel, and a window with a chamfered surround.	II
Font, Wreay Churchyard; 54.83192°N 2.88094°W	—	1733	The font from an earlier church has been relocated in the churchyard of St Mary's Church. It is in sandstone, and consists of a square base, a chamfered column, and a square shallow bowl with moulded panels on the faces.	II
Blackwell House and stables 54.86739°N 2.93266°W	—	1730s to 1740s	The farmhouse is rendered with stone dressings, a moulded cornice, and a slate roof with coped gables and a tile ridge. There are two storeys and five bays. The doorway has a moulded architrave and a dentilled cornice, and the sash windows have moulded surrounds. The stable extension of 1905 extends to the left, it is in brick, and has 1 1/2 storeys and six bays. It contains plank doors and a garage door.	II
Scalesceugh Hall; 54.83897°N 2.86105°W		1746	A farmhouse that was expanded into a country house in Georgian style in 1913–14, and which has since been used for other purposes. It is rendered with sandstone dressings, and has a Westmorland slate roof. There are two storeys with a basement, and the hall has an irregular H-shaped plan. On the entrance front is a projecting porch with Ionic pilasters and a door with a moulded surround and a Latin inscription above. Over the porch is a stone balcony, ball finials, and a segmental broken pediment. The porch is flanked by gabled wings and bay windows. On the garden front is a curved bay with Ionic pilasters, and a curved double staircase with decorative wrought iron balustrading. The former farmhouse is linked to the hall, it has two storeys, three bays, and a cross wing.	II
Green Cottage, Millstone Cottage and threshing barn 54.85093°N 2.95578°W	—	Mid 18th century	The cottages have been converted from a farmhouse and a barn, they are in brick with stone dressings, and have a roof of slate and stone-slate with coped gables. The former farmhouse has two storeys, three bays, and sash windows. The other cottage has 20th-century windows, door and garage doors. The threshing barn at right angles to the right dates from the early 19th century and was converted to steam threshing in about 1840. It is built in sandstone and cobbles with a stone-slate roof, and contains a cart entrance, doors, and windows with stone surrounds. Attached is a boiler house that has a tall brick chimney with a string course and a cap.	II
Town Head Farmhouse; 54.83749°N 2.94490°W	—	1754	A sandstone farmhouse with quoins, decorative gutter brackets, and a slate roof. There are two storeys and three bays. The doorway has a moulded surround, a false keystone, and a moulded cornice. Above the doorway is a dated sundial with a moulded surround and Roman numerals. The windows are sashes with plain surrounds.	II
Newbiggin Hall Farmhouse and outbuildings 54.84964°N 2.88495°W	—	1767	The farmhouse and attached outbuildings are in sandstone with slate roofs, forming a linear plan with the house in the middle, The house has two storeys, two bays, and a double pile plan. It has a central doorway with a dated and inscribed lintel, and sliding sash windows with moulded sills. Flanking the house on both sides are differing farm buildings with a variety of openings.	II
Carleton Farmhouse and barns 54.86731°N 2.89365°W	—	1770s	The farmhouse and adjoining barns are in sandstone and have slate roofs with coped gables. The house has two storeys and three bays. The doorway has a moulded surround, an ornamental frieze, and a moulded pediment, and the windows are sashes. To the left is a barn with an L-shaped plan, and beyond that is another barn. They contain cart entrances, plank doors, casement windows, loft doors, and ventilation slits.	II
Walls and gate piers, Carleton Farm; 54.84269°N 2.85867°W	—	Late 18th century	The walls and gate piers are in sandstone. The walls are low, they have a moulded plinth and coping, and they surround three sides of the garden in front of the house. The gate piers are square with moulded capitals, and are surmounted by stone pine cones.	II
5 Brisco View; 54.86683°N 2.89186°W	—	Late 18th century	A stuccoed house with a slate roof, in two storeys and three bays. The doorway and sash windows have plain surrounds.	II
Brisco Hill; 54.85420°N 2.89605°W	—	Late 18th century	A house that was extended in about 1830, in sandstone with a slate roof. The original part has two storeys and five bays, and the higher extension has two storeys and three bays. The round-headed doorway has engaged Tuscan columns, an open dentilled pediment, and a radial fanlight, and the windows are sashes.	II
Carleton Hill Farmhouse; 54.84284°N 2.85812°W	—	Late 18th century	A sandstone farmhouse with a slate roof, in two storeys and three bays. The round-headed doorway has moulded pilasters, a fanlight, and a false keystone. It is flanked in the ground floor bay by Venetian windows in moulded surrounds, and in the upper storey the windows have three lights; all are sashes. There are single-bay extensions with hipped roofs on both sides, containing casement windows.	II
The Cottage; 54.86600°N 2.89042°W	—	Late 18th century	A rendered house with a slate roof, in two storeys and two bays. Three steps lead up to the doorway that has a plain surround, a rounded moulded head with a false keystone, and a patterned fanlight. The windows are sashes with plain surrounds.	II
Orchard House; 54.86524°N 2.89054°W	—	Late 18th century	A sandstone house with quoins and a slate roof. There are two storeys and three bays. The round-headed doorway has a plain surround, a false keystone, and a fanlight. Flanking it are segmental bay windows containing curved sash windows.	II
Brisco Farmhouse; 54.85909°N 2.90437°W	—	Early 19th century	A stuccoed farmhouse with stone dressings, quoins, and a hipped slate roof. There are two storeys and three bays. The doorway has squared pilasters, a dentilled entablature, a moulded cornice, and a fanlight. The windows, which are sashes, have moulded surrounds.	II
Brookside and Cammock House; 54.86702°N 2.91353°W	—	Early 19th century	A pair of sandstone houses with quoins and a hipped slate roof. There are two storeys, and each house has two bays. The sash windows and doorways have plain surrounds.	II
Croft House and Petteril Villas; 54.86641°N 2.89121°W	—	Early 19th century	A row of three sandstone houses with a slate roof and coped gables at the ends. They have two storeys and each house has three bays. The doorways have moulded surrounds, architraves, and cornices. The windows in the upper floor of Croft House are original sashes, the others are replacements. Between Croft House and No. 1 Petteril Villas is a carriage arch.	II
Ice house, Newbiggin Hall; 54.84962°N 2.88298°W	—	Early 19th century	The ice house consists of a chamber below ground entered through a trap door in its roof. It is a rectangular chamber with sandstone walls, roof and floor, with a central soakaway drain.	II
Farm buildings, The Beeches; 54.86595°N 2.88928°W	—	1826	The farm buildings consist of a cart shed and a barn forming an L-shaped plan. They are in red and yellow sandstone and have slate roofs. The cart shed has 2 1/2 storeys, the barn has 1 1/2 storeys at the front and three at the rear. Both buildings have cart entrances, small windows, loft doors, and ventilation slits.	II
Pompeian Cottage; 54.83272°N 2.88307°W	—	c. 1830	The cottage was built for the schoolmaster and its design by Sara Losh is based on a house on Pompeii. It is in calciferous sandstone with a roof of slate and some stone-slate. There are two storeys, a single bay with a single-bay extension to the right, and another extension at the rear. The windows are casements.	II
Farm buildings, Newbiggin Hall; 54.84936°N 2.88489°W	—	Early to mid 19th century	The farm buildings are in sandstone with slate roofs. They form an L-shaped plan, with a two-storey four-bay cowhouse on one range, and a single-storied stable and cart lodge on the other. The buildings have doorways, windows, and ventilation slits.	II
Langarth; 54.85823°N 2.90379°W	—	1830s	Designed in Tudor style, the house is in calciferous sandstone, and has a slate roof with some stone-slate. There are two storeys, five bays, a double depth plan, and a single-storey one-bay extension to the right. On the front is a full-height gabled porch that has a chamfered surround, a pointed arch, a hood mould, and triple lancet windows above. The other windows are triple-mullions with moulded surrounds containing casements.	II
Mortuary Chapel; 54.83455°N 2.88237°W	—	c. 1835	The mortuary chapel, designed by Sara Losh and since used for other purposes, is in calciferous sandstone, and has a roof of stone-slate. It measures about 10 metres (33 ft) long, 6 metres (20 ft) wide, and 4 metres (13 ft) high. The two round-headed doorways have roll-moulded surrounds, springers with carved heads, and a lion's head at the apex. There are two windows, one a casement, the other a lancet.	II
Sexton's Cottage; 54.83463°N 2.88166°W	—	c. 1835	The cottage, designed by Sara Losh, is in calciferous sandstone, and has a roof of slate with some stone-slate. There are 1 1/2 storeys and two bays. The doorway has a plain surround, as do the windows, which are round-headed with casements. In the attic are small five-light round-headed windows.	II
St Ninian's Well; 54.86040°N 2.90208°W	—	1830s to 1840s	A well head designed by Sara Losh on the site of an ancient holy well dedicated to Saint Ninian. It is in sandstone, and consists of a square trough and a round-headed moulded arch. The structure is decorated with crosses and lozenges.	II
St Mary's Church; 54.83202°N 2.88061°W		1840–42	The church was designed by Sara Losh in Romanesque style. It is in sandstone with a stone-slate roof, and consists of a nave with an apse at the east end. The west doorway and the windows are round-headed, there is blind arcading round the apse, and a west bellcote. The surroundings of the door and windows and the angle pilasters are decorated with naturalistic carvings, and on the bellcote is a carved eagle. Above the main windows, under the eaves, are groups of small windows.	II*
Sundial, Wreay Churchyard; 54.83185°N 2.88081°W	—	c. 1842	The sundial, designed by Sara Losh, stands close to the west doorway of St Mary's Church. It is in sandstone, and consists of a round column on a square chamfered base. The column is carved with pine cones and is surmounted by a cap in the form of a sunflower, on which is a brass dial with Roman numerals.	II
Cross, Wreay Churchyard; 54.83234°N 2.88087°W		c. 1843	The cross, in the churchyard of St Mary's Church, was designed by Sara Losh as a memorial to members of her family. The design is based on the Bewcastle Cross. The cross is in calciferous sandstone and consists of a tall tapering square column surmounted by a small cross-head. The column is carved with figures, Celtic designs, and inscriptions.	II
Mausoleum, Wreay Churchyard; 54.83237°N 2.88129°W		1850	The mausoleum is in the churchyard of St Mary's Church, and was designed by Sara Losh for her family. It is built in large blocks of calciferous sandstone, and has a projecting cornice and a flat roof. Inside is a marble statue of Sara's sister Katherine, and medallions of other members of her family.	II
High Burnthwaite Farmhouse; 54.82651°N 2.92507°W	—	1860s	The farmhouse incorporates earlier features, and is in sandstone on a rusticated plinth, with quoins, a moulded cornice, and a hipped slate roof. There are two storeys and three bays. The round-headed doorway has pilasters, a plain entablature, a moulded cornice, and a fanlight. The windows are sashes in moulded surrounds. The original farmhouse has been rebuilt at the rear, it is in a single storey, and incorporates a dated and inscribed lintel.	II
Worthington Place; 54.87752°N 2.88655°W		1875	The former hospital chapel was designed by J. A. Cory in Perpendicular style. It is in sandstone with slate roofs and coped gables, and consists of a nave, a chancel, porches with vestries, and a bell turret and spire over the south porch. The bell turret is octagonal with a crenellated parapet, on which is a plain octagonal spire.	II
Woodside Lodge and stable block 54.84554°N 2.89195°W	—	1879–80	The lodge and stables, designed by C. J. Ferguson, form a U-shaped plan and have been converted into a private house. The lodge has two storeys and two bays, the ground floor is in calciferous sandstone, the jettied upper floor is half timbered. The roof is in green slate with decorative ridge tiles and gables with decorative bargeboards and pinnacles. The doorway has a moulded surround, a fanlight, and a pointed arch. In the upper floor the windows are mullioned and transomed, and on the left side is a bay window. The former stable block is in a single storey and has casement windows.	II
Gate piers, Woodside; 54.84556°N 2.89234°W	—	1879–80	The gate piers for Woodside (since demolished) were probably designed by C. J. Ferguson, They are in calciferous sandstone and are square. Each has a column of alternating large and small blocks, a capital carved with the Losh family coat of arms, and a moulded cornice.	II

== Notes and references ==
=== Sources ===
- Historic England, "Newbiggin Hall, St. Cuthbert Without (1087720)", National Heritage List for England
- Historic England, "Garden Wall to south-east of Newbiggin Hall, St. Cuthbert Without (1335520)", National Heritage List for England
- Historic England, "Cottage north-east of Town Head Farmhouse, St. Cuthbert Without (1087753)", National Heritage List for England
- Historic England, "Brisco Hall, St. Cuthbert Without (1087747)", National Heritage List for England
- Historic England, "Wooden Walls, St. Cuthbert Without (1335497)", National Heritage List for England
- Historic England, "Blackhall Wood Farmhouse and adjoining barn, St. Cuthbert Without (1335503)", National Heritage List for England
- Historic England, "Barn to west of Cottage, north-east of Town Head Farmhouse, St. Cuthbert Without (1087754)", National Heritage List for England
- Historic England, "The Beeches, St. Cuthbert Without (1087750)", National Heritage List for England
- Historic England, "Blackwell Farmhouse, St. Cuthbert Without (1335494)", National Heritage List for England
- Historic England, "Outbuilding to south-east of The Cottage and north-west of The Beeches, St. Cuthbert Without (1087749)", National Heritage List for England
- Historic England, "Re-erected font in Wreay Churchyard, St. Cuthbert Without (1335502)", National Heritage List for England
- Historic England, "Blackwell House and stables, St. Cuthbert Without (1087744)", National Heritage List for England
- Historic England, "Scalesceugh Hall, St. Cuthbert Without (1391509)", National Heritage List for England
- Historic England, "Green Cottage and Millstone Cottage, south of Blackhall Wood Farmhouse, and threshing barn to south, St. Cuthbert Without (1335518)", National Heritage List for England
- Historic England, "Town Head Farmhouse, St. Cuthbert Without (1087752)", National Heritage List for England
- Historic England, "Newbiggin Hall Farmhouse and attached outbuildings, St. Cuthbert Without (1386533)", National Heritage List for England
- Historic England, "Carleton Farmhouse and barns adjoining, St. Cuthbert Without (1335500)", National Heritage List for England
- Historic England, "Garden wall and Gate Piers to west of Carleton Hill, St. Cuthbert Without (1335519)", National Heritage List for England
- Historic England, "No. 5 Brisco View, St. Cuthbert Without (1087743)", National Heritage List for England
- Historic England, "Brisco Hill, St. Cuthbert Without (1087746)", National Heritage List for England
- Historic England, "Sprunston Farmhouse and barns adjoining to north and east, St. Cuthbert Without (1335521)", National Heritage List for England
- Historic England, "Carleton Hill Farmhouse, St. Cuthbert Without (1087718)", National Heritage List for England
- Historic England, "The Cottage, St. Cuthbert Without (1335498)", National Heritage List for England
- Historic England, "Orchard House, St. Cuthbert Without (1087751)", National Heritage List for England
- Historic England, "Brisco Farmhouse, St. Cuthbert Without (1335495)", National Heritage List for England
- Historic England, "Brookside and Cammock House, St. Cuthbert Without (1335493)", National Heritage List for England
- Historic England, "Croft House and Nos. 1 and 2 Petteril Villas, St. Cuthbert Without (1087748)", National Heritage List for England
- Historic England, "Ice House to north-east of Newbiggin Hall, St. Cuthbert Without (1087721)", National Heritage List for England
- Historic England, "Farm buildings to east of The Beeches, St. Cuthbert Without (1335499)", National Heritage List for England
- Historic England, "Pompeian Cottage, St. Cuthbert Without (1087761)", National Heritage List for England
- Historic England, "Farm buildings to the south-east of Newbiggin Hall Farmhouse and attached outbuildings, St. Cuthbert Without (1386534)", National Heritage List for England
- Historic England, "Langarth, St. Cuthbert Without (1335496)", National Heritage List for England
- Historic England, "Mortuary Chapel, St. Cuthbert Without (1087757)", National Heritage List for England
- Historic England, "Sexton's Cottage, St. Cuthbert Without (1087756)", National Heritage List for England
- Historic England, "St Ninian's Well, St. Cuthbert Without (1087745)", National Heritage List for England
- Historic England, "Church of St Mary, St. Cuthbert Without (1087758)", National Heritage List for England
- Historic England, "Sundial in Wreay Churchyard, St. Cuthbert Without (1087760)", National Heritage List for England
- Historic England, "Cross in Wreay Churchyard, St. Cuthbert Without (1087759)", National Heritage List for England
- Historic England, "Wreay Churchyard, Losh Mausoleum, St. Cuthbert Without (1335501)", National Heritage List for England
- Historic England, "High Burnthwaite Farmhouse, St. Cuthbert Without (1087719)", National Heritage List for England
- Historic England, "Worthington Place, St. Cuthbert Without (1376806)", National Heritage List for England
- Historic England, "Woodside Lodge with stable block, St. Cuthbert Without (1087722)", National Heritage List for England
- Historic England, "Gate piers to west of Woodside Lodge, St. Cuthbert Without (1335522)", National Heritage List for England
- Historic England, Listed Buildings
- Hyde, Matthew; Pevsner, Nikolaus (2010) [1967], Cumbria, The Buildings of England, New Haven and London: Yale University Press, ISBN 978-0-300-12663-1
