= List of Holy Wells in Cumbria =

There are at least 70 existing holy wells in Cumbria that were once venerated and believed to have the ability to cure certain illnesses.

The following is a list of notable holy wells in Cumbria.

Name	Image	Location	Nearest settlement	Notes	References
St Andrew's Well		54.917090°N 3.009468°W	Kirkandrews-on-Eden	As the well is located in a churchyard, it was probably used for baptisms. It is medieval in origin.	
St Cuthbert's Well		54.682056°N 2.677752°W	Edenhall	According to local legend, a group of fairies were interrupted whilst drinking from the well, and they left behind a medieval glass cup, which is known as the "Luck of Edenhall".	
St Helen's Well		54.5138°N 2.4931°W	Great Asby	The well is a grade II listed building. The stone enclosure likely dates from the 19th century.	
Holy Well		54.157363°N 2.935449°W	Lower Allithwaite	Miners in the area regarded the well as possessing healing properties of some kind. At some point, the well was possibly dedicated to St Agnes.	
St Michael's Well		55.0005°N 2.9723°W	Arthuret	This well probably dates from the 17th century.	
St Ninian's Well		54.8595°N 2.9009°W	Briscoe	The well and wellhead are grade II listed. The well itself is ancient, but the wellhead dates from the 19th century, when it was restored by Sarah Losh.	
St Mungo's Well		54.8122°N 3.2836°W	Bromfield	The wellhead is a grade II listed structure; it was built in 1878. The well itself dates from the medieval period.	
St Patrick's Well		54.541121°N 2.9480724°W	Patterdale	The original well was probably located in a slightly different place to where it is today. The present wellhouse was constructed at some point in the 18th century.	
