= St Cuthbert Without =

Civil parish in Cumbria, England

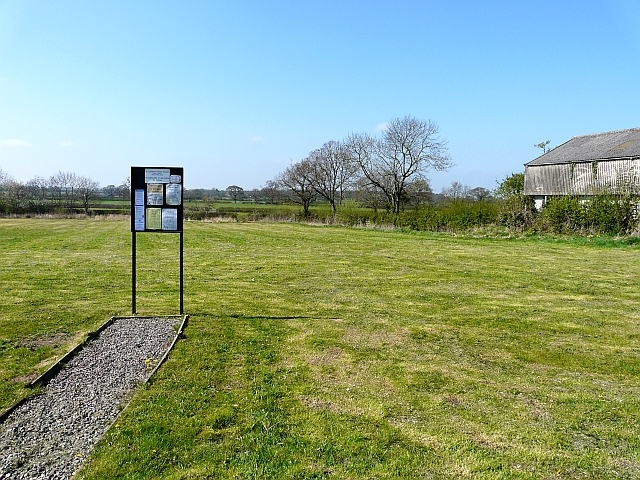
- Brisco Common

- Location within Cumbria
- Population: 5,143 (Parish, 2021)
- OS grid reference: NY420500
- Civil parish: St Cuthbert Without
- Unitary authority: Cumberland
- Ceremonial county: Cumbria
- Region: North West
- Country: England
- Sovereign state: United Kingdom
- Post town: CARLISLE
- Police: Cumbria
- Fire: Cumbria
- Ambulance: North West
- UK Parliament: Penrith and Solway Carlisle

St Cuthbert Without is a civil parish within the Cumberland unitary authority area in Cumbria, England. The parish lies immediately to the south of Carlisle itself and includes the settlements of Blackwell, Durdar, Carleton, Brisco and Wreay.

== History ==
The parish has its origins in the ancient parish of Carlisle St Cuthbert. The parish was subdivided into nine townships: Botcherby, Botchergate, Brisco, Carleton, English Street, Harraby, High Blackhall, Low Blackhall, and Upperby. The English Street township was within the ancient borough boundaries of Carlisle, which roughly followed the Carlisle city walls, whereas the rest of the parish was outside (or 'without') the borough. Botchergate was added to the parliamentary borough (constituency) of Carlisle in 1832, and the municipal borough boundaries were adjusted to match the constituency in 1836.

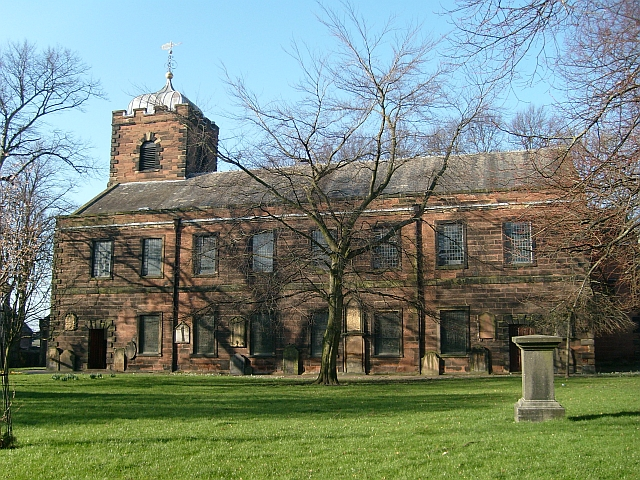
St Cuthbert's Church, Carlisle, after which the parish is named, despite it not being in the parish

From the 17th century onwards, parishes were gradually given various civil functions under the poor laws, in addition to their original ecclesiastical functions. In some cases, including Carlisle St Cuthbert, the civil functions were exercised by subdivisions of the parish rather than the parish as a whole. The parish was split into two parts for administering the poor laws: the English Street township, and the rest of the parish. In 1866, the legal definition of 'parish' was changed to be the areas used for administering the poor laws, and so the English Street township became the civil parish of St Cuthbert Within, and the rest of the old parish became a civil parish called St Cuthbert Without. Botchergate, despite having been brought within the borough boundaries in 1836, continued to form part of St Cuthbert Without parish until 1894.

The parish boundaries were then adjusted on a number of occasions, mostly ceding further territory to Carlisle. The civil parish of Wreay (which had historically been a township in the parish of Carlisle St Mary) was abolished in 1934 and its area added to St Cuthbert Without.

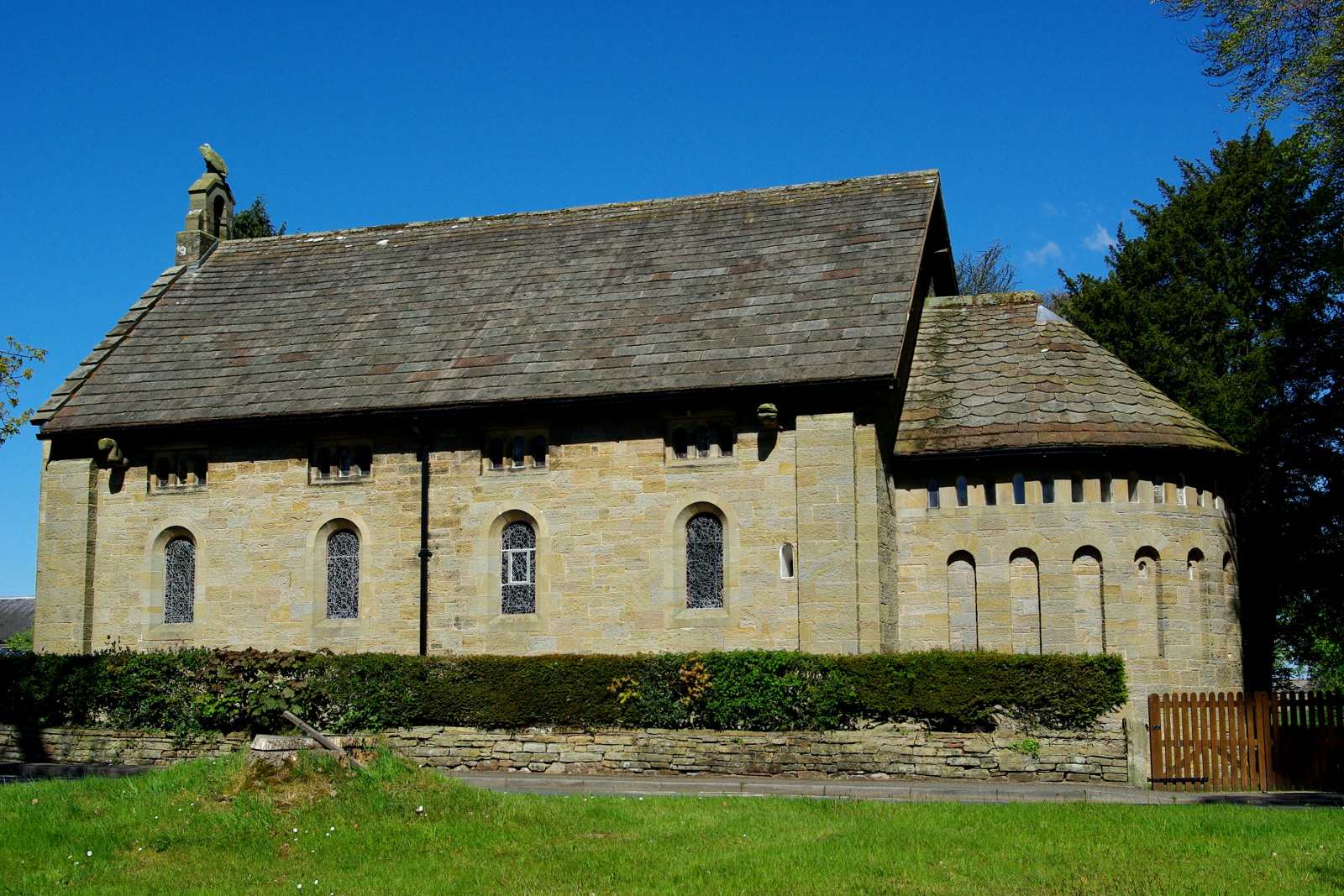
St Mary's Church, Wreay

St Mary's Church, Wreay, built in 1842, is notable for its architecture.

== Geography ==
The M6, A6 and West Coast main railway line all run through the parish. The A6 meets the M6 at junction 42 (the Golden Fleece Roundabout) in Carleton. At different times there have been railway stations at Wreay and Brisco.

The main river in the parish is the River Petteril.

=== Blackwell ===
Blackwell (54.868°N 2.932°W) is a village in the parish, just south of Carlisle. Carlisle Racecourse is in the village.

=== Durdar ===
Durdar (54.850°N 2.928°W; postcode district CA2) is a small suburban area based around a crossroads (with a pub the Black Lion, and a petrol station/garage) in the parish, 2 km to the south of the city of Carlisle.

== Governance ==
There are two tiers of local government covering St Cuthbert Without, at parish and unitary authority level: St Cuthbert Without Parish Council and Cumberland Council.

From 1974 to 2023 the parish was in Carlisle district.

== See also ==
- Listed buildings in St Cuthbert Without
