= Carleton, St Cuthbert Without =

Hamlet in Cumbria, England

Coordinates: 54.867°N 2.893°W

Carleton
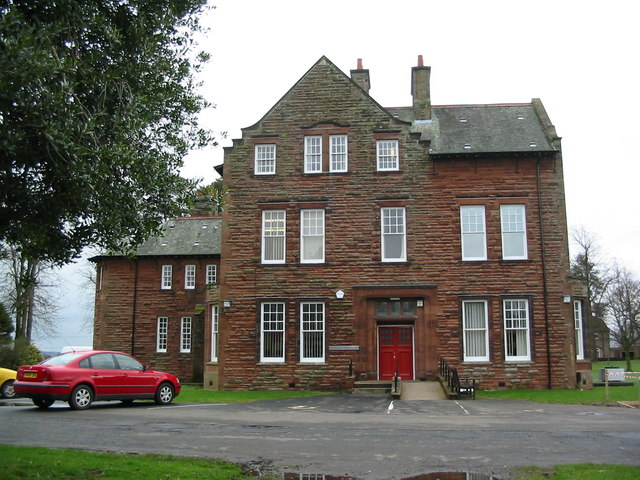
- Cumberland House, Carleton

- Location within Cumbria
- OS grid reference: NY426528
- Civil parish: St Cuthbert Without
- Unitary authority: Cumberland
- Ceremonial county: Cumbria
- Region: North West
- Country: England
- Sovereign state: United Kingdom
- Post town: CARLISLE
- Postcode district: CA1
- Dialling code: 01228
- Police: Cumbria
- Fire: Cumbria
- Ambulance: North West
- UK Parliament: Carlisle

Carleton is a hamlet on the A6 road, in the civil parish of St Cuthbert Without, in the Cumberland district, in the ceremonial county of Cumbria, England. In the Imperial Gazetteer of England and Wales of 1870–1872 it had a population of 181.

The buildings along the A6 between Junction 42 of the M6 to Barrock Fell including Scalesceugh Hall are all addressed as being part of Carleton.

Garlands Hospital (formerly Cumberland and Westmorland Lunatic Asylum) was based in the village until it closed in 1999.

== Location ==
It is a few miles to the south-east of the city centre of Carlisle and is near the River Petteril.

== Nearby settlements ==
Nearby settlements include the city of Carlisle, the residential area (suburb of Carlisle) of Harraby.

== History ==
The name "Carleton" means "the enclosure or farm of Carl".

== See also ==
- Listed buildings in St Cuthbert Without
