= Wreay railway station =

Former railway station in Cumbria, England

Wreay

General information
- Location: Wreay, Cumberland; England
- Coordinates: 54.8303°N 2.8766°W
- Grid reference: NY437487
- Platforms: 2

Other information
- Status: Disused

History
- Original company: Lancaster and Carlisle Railway
- Pre-grouping: London and North Western Railway
- Post-grouping: London, Midland and Scottish Railway

Key dates
- Dec.1852: Opened
- 16 August 1943: Closed
Location

Wreay railway station in St Cuthbert Without parish, was situated on the Lancaster and Carlisle Railway (the West Coast Main Line) between Carlisle and Penrith. It served the village of Wreay, Cumbria, England. The station opened in 1852, and closed on 16 August 1943.

== The station ==
The station had two platforms, a weighing platform and a signal box. The station buildings are now private dwellings. The line is now electrified.

== Stations on the line ==
The next station on the line towards Carlisle was the now closed Brisco and the preceding station was the now closed Southwaite. Brisco railway station proved to be unviable and the decision was made to close it in 1852 in favour of Wreay railway station.
