= Garlands Hospital =

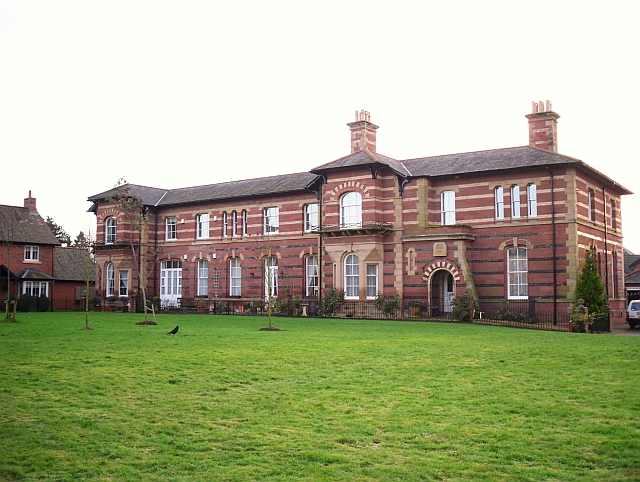
- Garlands Hospital

- Shown in Cumbria

Geography
- Location: Carleton near Carlisle, Cumbria, England
- Coordinates: 54.8766°N 2.8858°W

Organisation
- Care system: NHS
- Type: Specialist

Services
- Emergency department: N/A
- Speciality: Psychiatric Hospital

History
- Founded: 1862
- Closed: 1999

Links
- Lists: Hospitals in England

Garlands Hospital was a mental health facility at Carleton near Carlisle in Cumbria, England.

== History ==
The hospital, which was designed by Thomas Worthington and John Augustus Cory using a Corridor Plan layout, opened as the Cumberland and Westmorland Lunatic Asylum in January 1862. The building was implemented by John Augustus Cory, surveyor to the county of Cumberland. It joined the National Health Service as Garlands Hospital in 1948. Concerns were raised in Parliament about the amount of overcrowding in the hospital in 1955.

After the introduction of Care in the Community in the early 1980s, the hospital went into a period of decline and closed in March 1999. The administration block was subsequently converted into apartments.
