= Brisco (surname) =

Brisco is an English surname. It derives either from Brisco in Cumbria or Briscoe in County Durham. Notable people with the surname include:

- Brisco baronets in Great Britain
- Gerald Brisco (born 1946), American wrestler
- Jack Brisco (1941–2010), American wrestler, brother of Gerald, uncle of Wes
- John Brisco Ray (1902–1973), English diver
- Mikiah Brisco (born 1996), American sprint runner
- Musgrave Brisco (1791–1854), British Conservative politician
- Neil Brisco (born 1978), English football player
- Robert Brisco (1928–2004), Canadian politician
- Robert Brisco Earée (1846–1928), English priest and philatelist
- Valerie Brisco-Hooks (born 1960), American sprint runner
- Wes Brisco (born 1983), American wrestler, son of Gerald
- Al Brisco, (born 1944), Canadian steel guitarist

== See also ==
- Briscoe (surname)
