= Wreay =

Village in Cumbria, England

Coordinates: 54.832°N 2.880°W

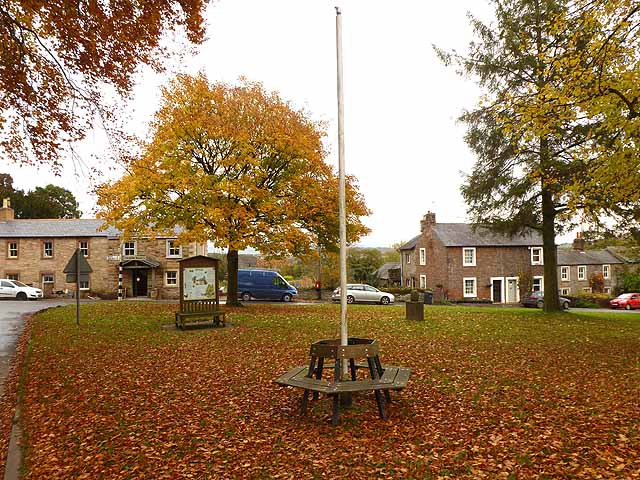
- Village green

- Flag

- Location within Cumbria
- OS grid reference: NY434489
- Civil parish: St Cuthbert Without
- Unitary authority: Cumberland
- Ceremonial county: Cumbria
- Region: North West
- Country: England
- Sovereign state: United Kingdom
- Post town: CARLISLE
- Postcode district: CA4
- Dialling code: 016974
- Police: Cumbria
- Fire: Cumbria
- Ambulance: North West
- UK Parliament: Penrith and Solway

Wreay (/ˈriːə/ REE-ə) is a village in the civil parish of St Cuthbert Without, in the Cumberland district of Cumbria, England. It lies on the River Petteril, and the M6 motorway, A6 trunk road and West Coast Main Line railway all skirt the village. It is 5 miles (8.0 km) south of Carlisle.

== History ==
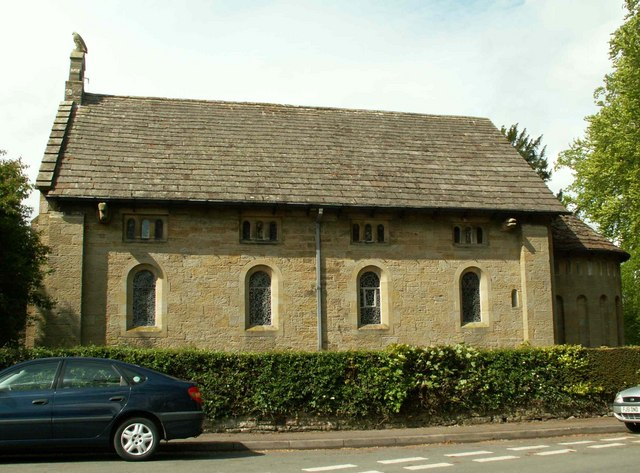
St Mary's Church, Wreay

The chapel was recorded in William Hutchinson's Directory of Cumberland, published in 1738: "The chapel of Wrea, in the parish of St Cuthbert is as ancient, at least, as the reign of King Henry II, for in the year 1319 Bishop Halton allowed a chaplain to it to attend divine office on condition that he resided upon the place.... The chapelry consists of the villages of Wrea of 20 families and Newbiggin."

An entry for the village appeared in 1870/1872, in John Marius Wilson's Imperial Gazetteer of England and Wales: "WREAY, a chapelry in Carlisle-St. Mary parish, Cumberland; on the Lancaster and Carlisle railway, 5½ miles SSE of Carlisle. It has a post-office under Carlisle, and a r. station. Acres, 1,088. Real property, £1,967. Pop., 166. Houses, 31. The property is divided among a few. The living is a p. curacy in the diocese of Carlisle. Value, £86.* Patrons, the Dean and Chapter of Carlisle. The church was built in 1739 [sic; 1839?]. There is a partially endowed school."

Scalescheugh Hall, which stands outside the village near to the A6 road dates from 1746 and was enlarged in 1913–1914. It was many years a residential home for people with cerebral palsy and has since been converted into apartments though the building suffered a large fire in September 2019. There are the remains of a Roman fort at Park Farm House half a mile NE of the village, to the west of the Roman road from York to Carlisle.

The pub restaurant, the Plough Inn, has been the meeting place at Candlemas since the 1660s of local trustees known as the Twelve Men of Wreay. Originally local landowners, they contributed to the upkeep of the church, appointed and paid the salary of the priest-cum-schoolmaster, and acted as guardians of the poor. The Twelve, who second new members as required, still meet annually. Traditionally they would eat a meal of bread, cheese, oatcake, butter and ale, smoke long clay pipes, tell tales of bygone days, and sing songs. The institution of the Twelve Men was the subject of a local television report in 2011.

Visitors to the Plough on Shrove Tuesday 1790 were the local landowner and industrialist John Losh (died 1814), father of Sara and resident at the mansion of Woodside, three miles up the road, Charles Howard, 11th Duke of Norfolk, Losh's brother James, and his cousin Joseph Liddell. They began the custom of annually electing a Mayor of Wreay, but this was abolished 90 years later due to rowdyism.

There is a path from the village to Wreay Woods Nature Reserve, a remnant of a much larger expanse of woodland alongside the River Petteril, managed by the Cumbria Wildlife Trust.

== Church ==
Wreay is noted for St Mary's Church, an adjacent mausoleum, and a copy of the 7th-century Bewcastle Cross.

The church, designed and built in basilica form in 1840–1842 by the local landowner Sara or Sarah Losh and the stonemason William Hindson, exhibits an original style which she called "early Saxon or modified Lombard". It makes striking use of carved plant and animal motifs. As the church website points out, "St Mary's embodies many of the attributes of the Arts and Crafts Movement and yet predates it by some 50 years." The carvings embody symbolism that "refers to death, rebirth and eternity, drawing upon Christian, pagan and personal references. It is a Grade II* listed building. The church replaced a small medieval chapel on a different site, which had become dilapidated by the 1830s. Recent repairs and restoration of the church have involved relaying sandstone roof slabs, internal redecoration, installing a new heating and lighting system, and constructing a new vestry. The church received a private visit from HRH Prince Charles in 2009.

Near the church is a Grade II listed mausoleum designed and erected by Sara Losh in 1850 in memory of her sister Katharine (1787–1817). Plans to restore this chapel of rest were announced in 2012. It contains a white marble statue of Katherine Losh, carved by a local sculptor, David Dunbar (1793–1866). Next to it is a Grade II listed reconstruction of the Saxon Bewcastle Cross, erected by Sara Losh around 1835, possibly in memory of her parents, John and Isabella Losh, but with an inscription apparently referring to the recent loss of her sister. Also by Sara Losh is the Grade II listed sexton's cottage.

== Governance ==
Wreay forms part of the civil parish of St Cuthbert Without. There are two tiers of local government, at civil parish and unitary authority level: St Cuthbert Without Parish Council and Cumberland Council. Wreay is in the parliamentary constituency of Penrith and Solway.

=== Administrative history ===
Wreay was historically a township and chapelry in the ancient parish of Carlisle St Mary (which had its parish church at Carlisle Cathedral). The township took on civil functions under the poor laws from the 17th century onwards. As such, Wreay also became a civil parish in 1866, when the legal definition of 'parish' was changed to be the areas used for administering the poor laws.

The civil parish of Wreay was abolished in 1934, with the area being absorbed into the neighbouring parish of St Cuthbert Without. At the 1931 census (the last before its abolition) the parish had a population of 131.

Between 1974 and 2023, St Cuthbert Without formed part of the Carlisle district. Since 2023 it has been administered as part of the Cumberland unitary authority area.

== Facilities ==
The village primary school has around 100 pupils, and is rated Outstanding by Ofsted.

The village has an equestrian centre.

Wreay railway station, on what became the West Coast Main Line, opened in 1843 but closed in 1953.

== See also ==
- Listed buildings in St Cuthbert Without
- List of English and Welsh endowed schools (19th century)
