= Brisco railway station =

Disused railway station in Cumbria, England

General information
- Location: Brisco, Cumberland; England
- Coordinates: 54.8528°N 2.8872°W
- Grid reference: NY431512
- Platforms: 2

Other information
- Status: Disused

History
- Original company: Lancaster and Carlisle Railway

Key dates
- 17 December 1846: Opened
- December 1852: Closed to passengers
- 1952: Closed to goods
Location

Brisco railway station (NY4313251259) in St Cuthbert Without parish, was situated on the Lancaster and Carlisle Railway (the West Coast Main Line) between Carlisle and Penrith. It served the rural district of Brisco and Newbiggin Hall, Cumbria, England. The station opened on 17 December 1846, and closed in December 1852.

== The station ==
The station had two platforms and a station master's house. In 2024, as part of the Carlisle Southern Link Road construction the station house was demolished, having up until that point existed as a private residence. The platforms were previously demolished many years ago. Brisco station proved to be unviable and the decision was made to close it in favour of Wreay railway station that was located nearby.

== Stations on the line ==
The next station on the line towards Carlisle was Carlisle and the preceding station was Wreay.
