= Brisco, Cumbria =

Village in Cumbria, England

Coordinates: 54.858°N 2.902°W

Brisco
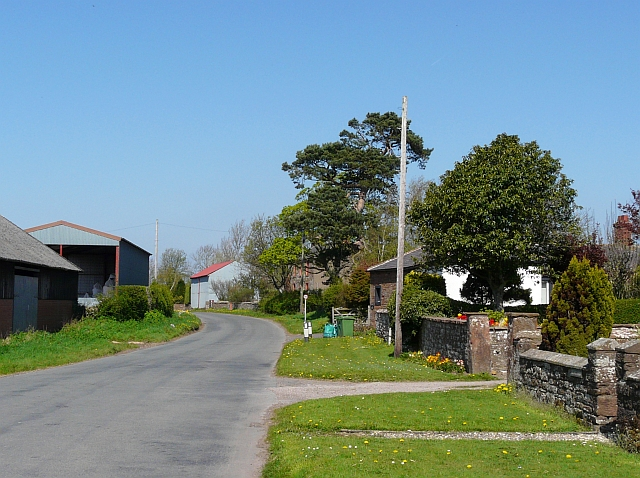
- Road through Brisco

- Location within the United Kingdom
- OS grid reference: NY421518
- Civil parish: St Cuthbert Without
- Unitary authority: Cumberland
- Ceremonial county: Cumbria
- Country: England
- Sovereign state: United Kingdom
- Post town: CARLISLE
- Postcode district: CA4
- Dialling code: 01228
- UK Parliament: Carlisle

Brisco or Birksceugh is a village in the civil parish of St Cuthbert Without, in the Cumberland district, in the county of Cumbria, England. It is located a few miles south of the city of Carlisle, near Junction 42 of the M6 motorway. There is St Ninian's well in the village. In the Imperial Gazetteer of England and Wales of 1870-72 the township had a population of 323.

== History ==
The name "Brisco" means "wood of the (Strathclyde) Britons", Brisco was recorded as "Brethesco" in the 1203 Pipe Rolls. The village is one of the possible sources of the surname Brisco. Brisco railway station served the village.

== See also ==
- Listed buildings in St Cuthbert Without
