= Sara Losh =

English architect and designer (1785–1853)

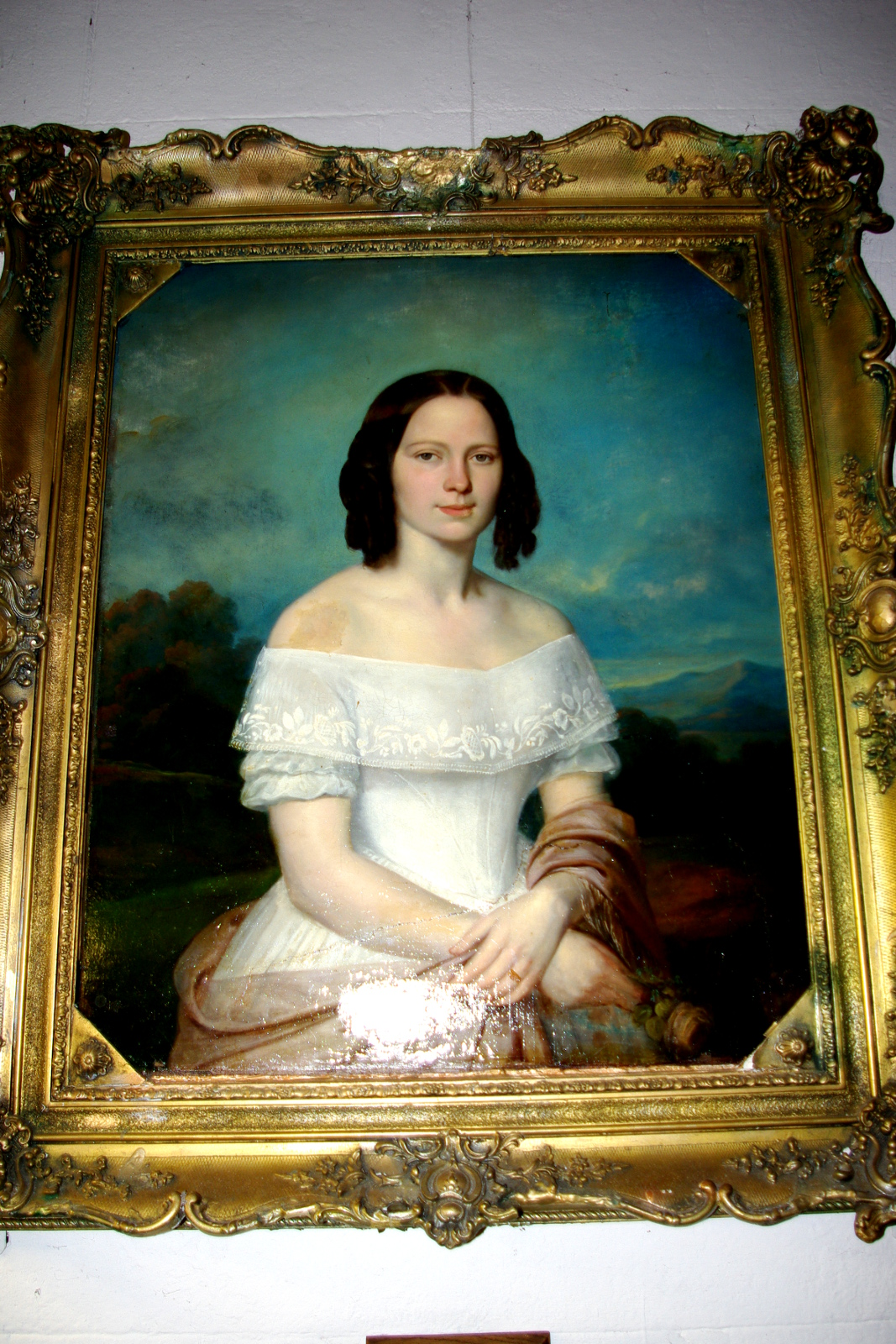
Oil painting in St Mary's Church, Wreay

Sara or Sarah Losh (1785 – 29 March 1853) was an English architect and designer. Her biographer describes her as an antiquarian, architect and visionary. She was a landowner of Wreay, Cumberland (now Cumbria), where her prime work, St Mary's Church, can be found. It anticipates the Arts and Crafts Movement and belongs to a group with buildings and monuments which Losh constructed.

== Life and family ==
Losh's papers were destroyed and none of her journals or drawings survive, but her life is described in Henry Lonsdale's The Worthies of Cumberland, published by Routledge in six volumes in 1867–1875.

She was born at Woodside in Wreay, near Carlisle, at an unknown date probably in late 1785, as she was baptised on 6 January 1786. She was the eldest of four children of John Losh (1756–1814) and his wife Isabella (née Bonner). Her father owned land in Woodside and was a partner with his brother William Losh in an alkali factory at Walker on Tyneside, part of Losh, Wilson and Bell.

One of her brothers died young and another had mental disabilities, so that Sara and her sister Katherine became joint heirs of their father's estate. Neither married and Sara inherited Katherine's share on her death in 1835. Her uncle, James Losh, was a barrister in Newcastle, a prominent member of the city's Literary and Philosophical Society, and friends with the poets William Wordsworth, Samuel Taylor Coleridge and Robert Southey.

Lonsdale calls Losh well read and educated. She had been to schools in Wreay, London and Bath, and travelled in France, Italy and Germany in 1814 and 1817. She spoke fluent French and Italian and could translate Latin with ease. Lonsdale compared her mind to that of George Eliot. Although she never married, she may have been romantically attached to a schoolfriend, Major Thain, who was killed at the Khyber Pass in 1842.

Sara Losh died at Woodside on 29 March 1853 and was buried in the churchyard of Wreay, where she shares a grave with her sister Katherine.

== Architecture ==
Losh designed, funded and built several projects in and around Wreay from the late 1820s onwards. An example is a replica of Bewcastle Cross as a memorial to her parents, installed in 1835, and a schoolteacher's house based on a villa in Pompeii. She also sunk wells and built village schools. By 1840, the old chapel at Wreay was in poor repair. Losh offered to grant the land and pay to replace it, provided she was given a free hand with its design. Permission was given by a faculty in May 1841.

Losh based her design on an early Christian basilica, with an aisle-less rectangular nave ending in a semicircular apse. She termed the style "early Saxon or modified Lombard". The apse has columns between spaces for 13 seats. The altar is a slab of Italian marble on brass eagles. The inside and outside surfaces are decorated with naturalistic stone carvings of fossils, plants and animals, many of them done by William Hindson, son of a local builder. Sara and her cousin William carved the font out of alabaster. The results were compared by Pevsner to the arts and crafts workmanship of decades later. There are no explicitly Christian symbols, not even a cross, but the profusion of decoration has been seen by some as a celebration of creation.

The church was completed at a cost of £1,200 and dedicated in December 1842. It is now a Grade II* listed building. The churchyard has a likewise Grade II listed mausoleum, built by Losh in 1850 in memory of her sister Katherine.

Losh also worked on restoring St John the Evangelist's Church, Newton Arlosh.

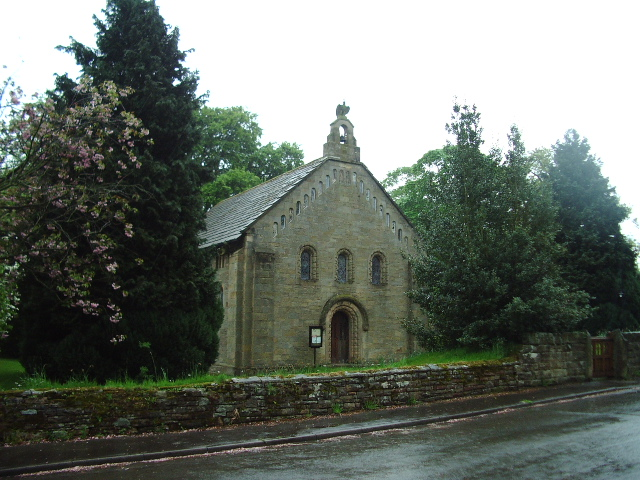
St Mary's Church, Wreay

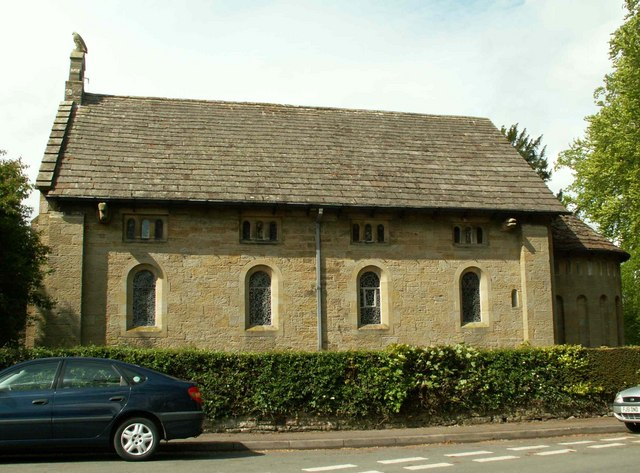
St Mary's Church, Wreay

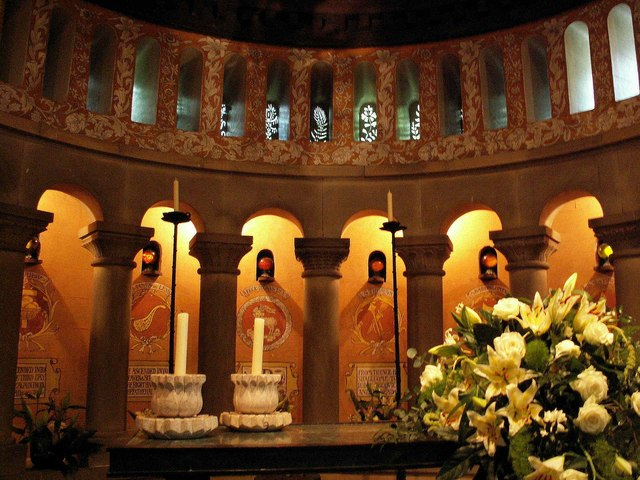
Altar and part of apse

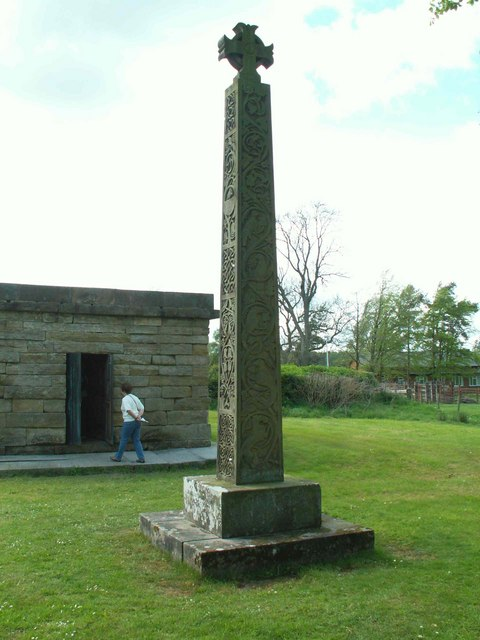
Replica of the Bewcastle Cross in the churchyard of St Mary's church, Wreay; the mausoleum of Katharine Losh is behind

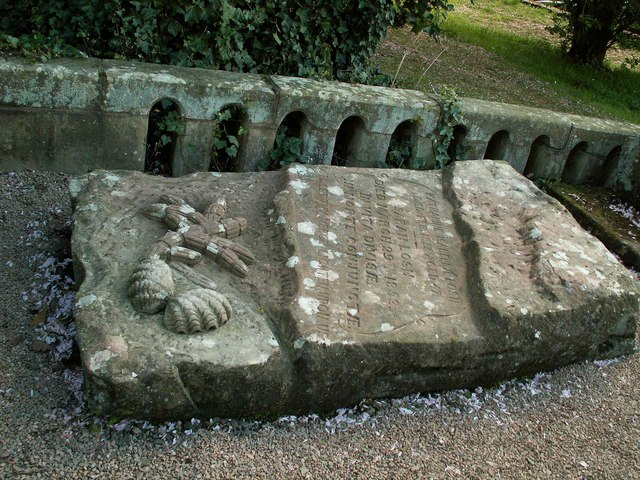
Gravestone of Katharine and Sarah Losh at St Mary's church, Wreay

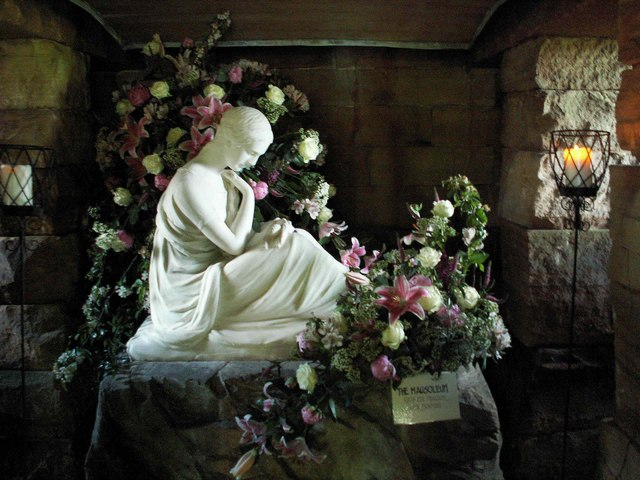
Mausoleum dedicated to Katharine Losh

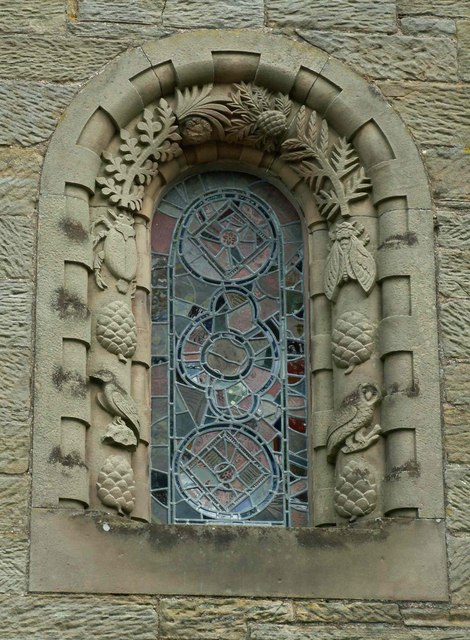
Stone window surround decorated with insects, birds and pinecones at St Mary's, Wreay

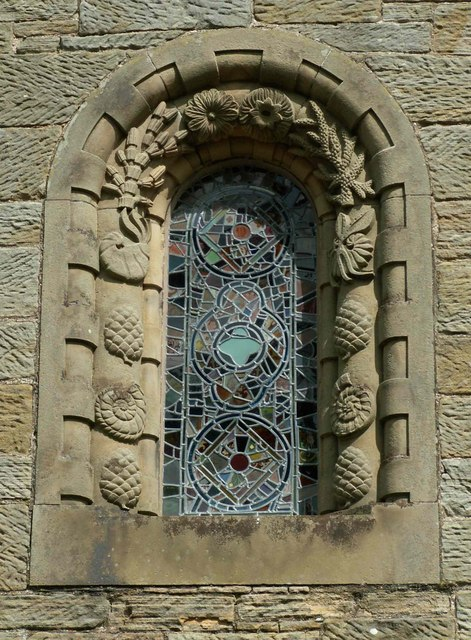
Stone window surround decorated with fossils, plants and pinecones at St Mary's, Wreay

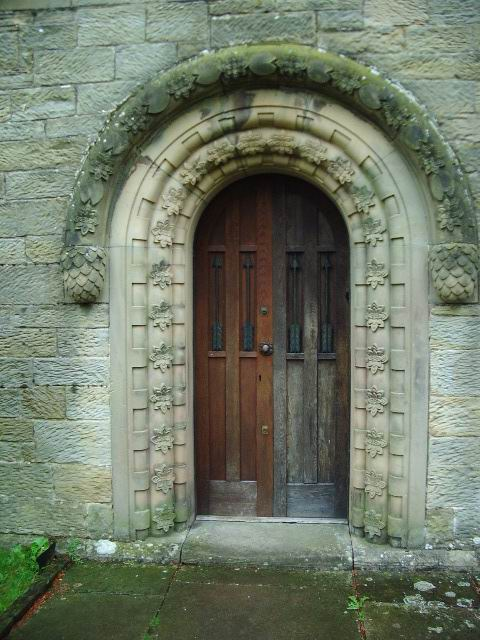
The main door of St Mary's Church, Wreay
