= Bewcastle Cross =

Anglo-Saxon cross in the county of Cumbria

Coordinates: 55°03′49″N 2°40′55″W

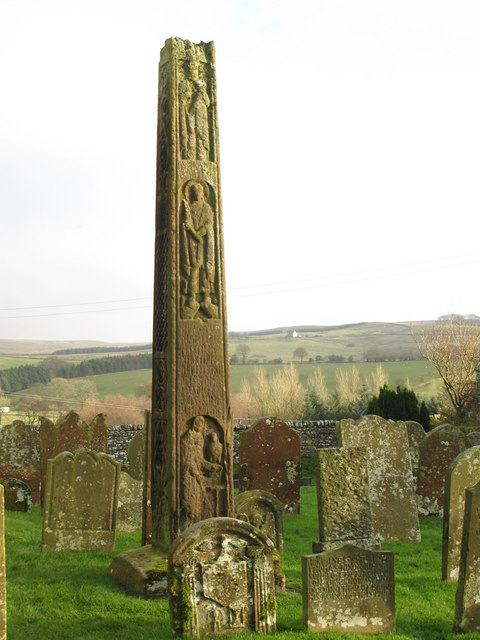
Bewcastle cross – west face

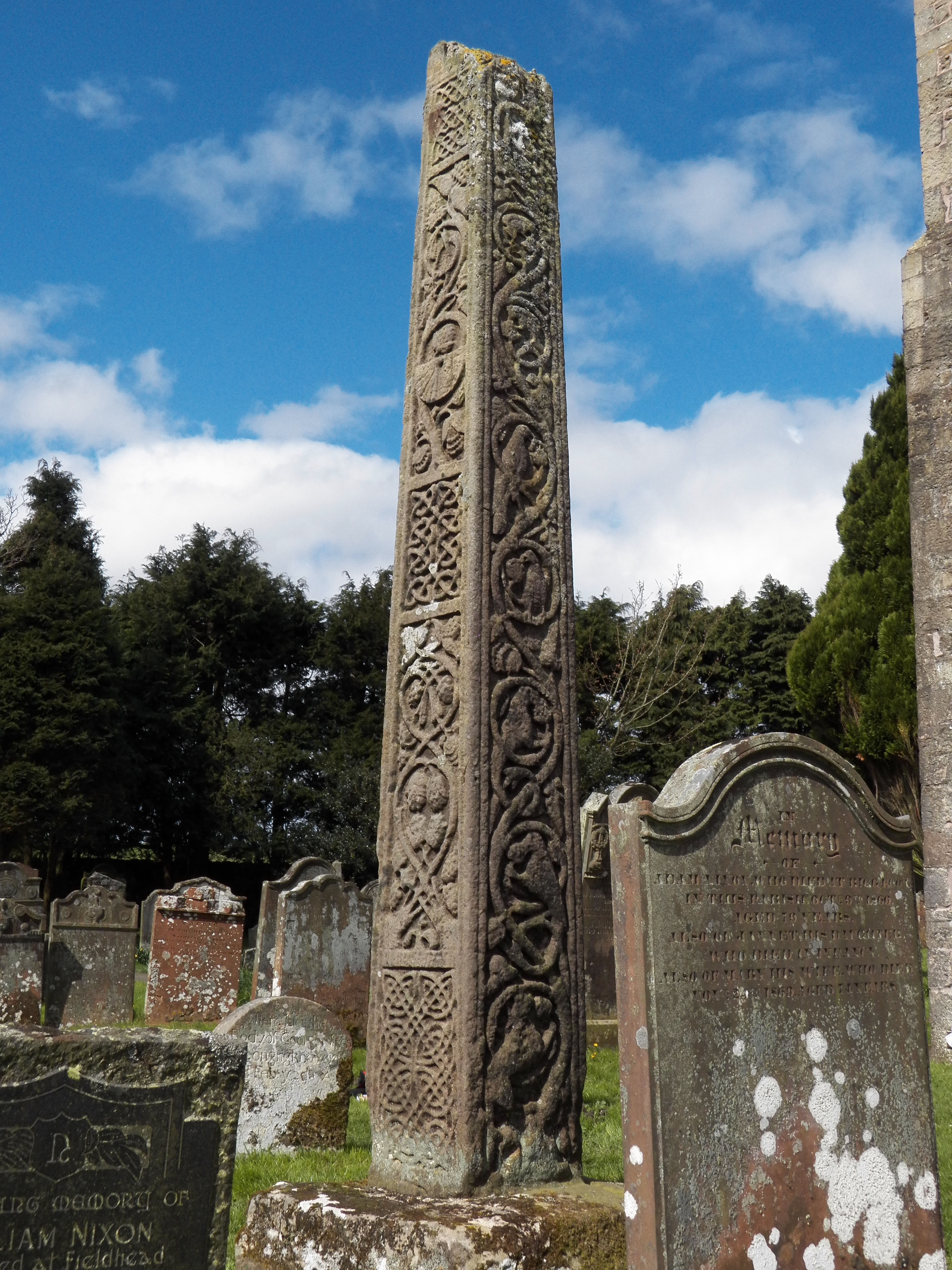
Bewcastle: the south and east faces of the cross

The Bewcastle Cross is an Northumbrian cross which is still in its original position within the churchyard of St Cuthbert's church at Bewcastle, in the English county of Cumbria. The cross, which probably dates from the 7th or early 8th century, features reliefs and inscriptions in the runic alphabet. The head of the cross is missing but the remains are 14.5 feet (4.4 metres) high, and almost square in section 22 by 21 1/4 inches (56 cm × 54 cm) at the base. The crosses of Bewcastle and Ruthwell have been described by the scholar Nikolaus Pevsner as "the greatest achievement of their date in the whole of Europe".

== Date ==
The cross is similar in many respects to the Ruthwell Cross, though the inscriptions are simpler, and seem to have a memorial function; together they are the largest and most elaborately decorated Northumbrian crosses to have survived mostly intact, and they are generally discussed together.

The dating of both remains controversial, though Éamonn Ó Carragaáin, writing in 2007, says that "although there is lively discussion about the dates of these monuments, there is a growing consensus that both are to be dated to the first half of the eighth century: as it were, to the “Age of Bede” (who died in 735) or to the generation after his death".

There have been suggestions that neither cross was originally a single piece of stone completed in one phase of work, and both have been proposed as the earlier. The theory that the cross is probably the work of the team of masons and sculptors brought in by Benedict Biscop from the 670s to expand the monastery of Monkwearmouth-Jarrow Abbey, then one of the leading centres of culture in the Kingdom of Northumbria is still supported by the Bewcastle website; this reflects the dating of scholars such as Meyer Schapiro.

== Reliefs ==
Each of the four sides of the cross is intricately decorated with reliefs divided into panels depicting figures (west side only), animals, chequers, vine scrolls, interlace knots, as well as a sundial. The north, west, and south sides of the cross feature runic inscriptions. Only the west face depicts human figures: the other three faces comprise panels of interlacing knotwork, vinescroll, and chequer-work.

The west face, which is the one that greets the visitor on entering the churchyard, comprises four panels. Two are arched, and two are square. Three have figures while one comprises runes. The arches and squares alternate down the panel: at the top is a square panel depicting John the Baptist holding the Lamb of God (Agnus Dei) in his left arm and pointing to it with his right hand. Below this is an arched panel in which, as at Ruthwell, a nimbussed Christ is being lifted up on the heads to two identical creatures, raising his right hand in an act of blessing while holding the scroll of life (Rev 5) in his left. This panel is to be understood as Christ the Judge recognised by the beasts. Some have interpreted it as a triumphant Christ treading on the beasts (i.e.vanquishing Satan), however the Latin inscription below the almost identical panel on the Ruthwell Cross explicitly states that Christ the judge is recognised by the beasts of the desert, a reference to Jesus' temptation in the desert in Mark 1:13. In the space between the top two panels is a runic inscription that reads +GESSUS KRISTTUS. Below the arched panel of Christ is a square panel comprising the runic inscription discussed further below. At the bottom of the west face, below the panel of runes, is a much-discussed figure of a falconer in an arched panel, who is possibly St. John the Evangelist with his eagle in an unusual depiction, possibly misunderstood from a Syrian model of John with an oil-lamp.

The sundial on its surface, a canonical sundial, "is by far the earliest English sundial to survive", divided into the four 'tides' that governed the working day in medieval times.

=== Runic inscriptions ===
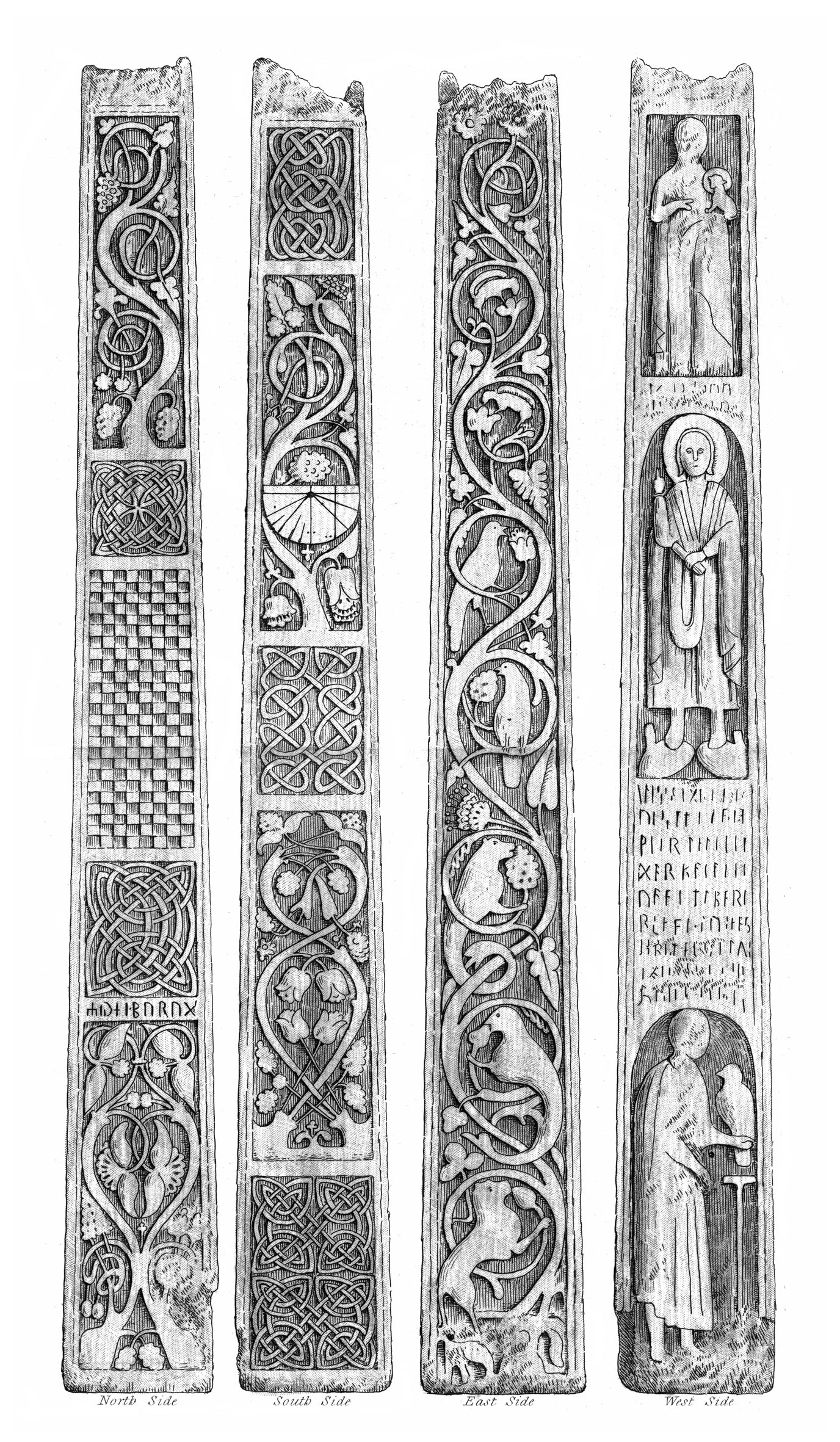
The four faces of the cross: north, south, east and west

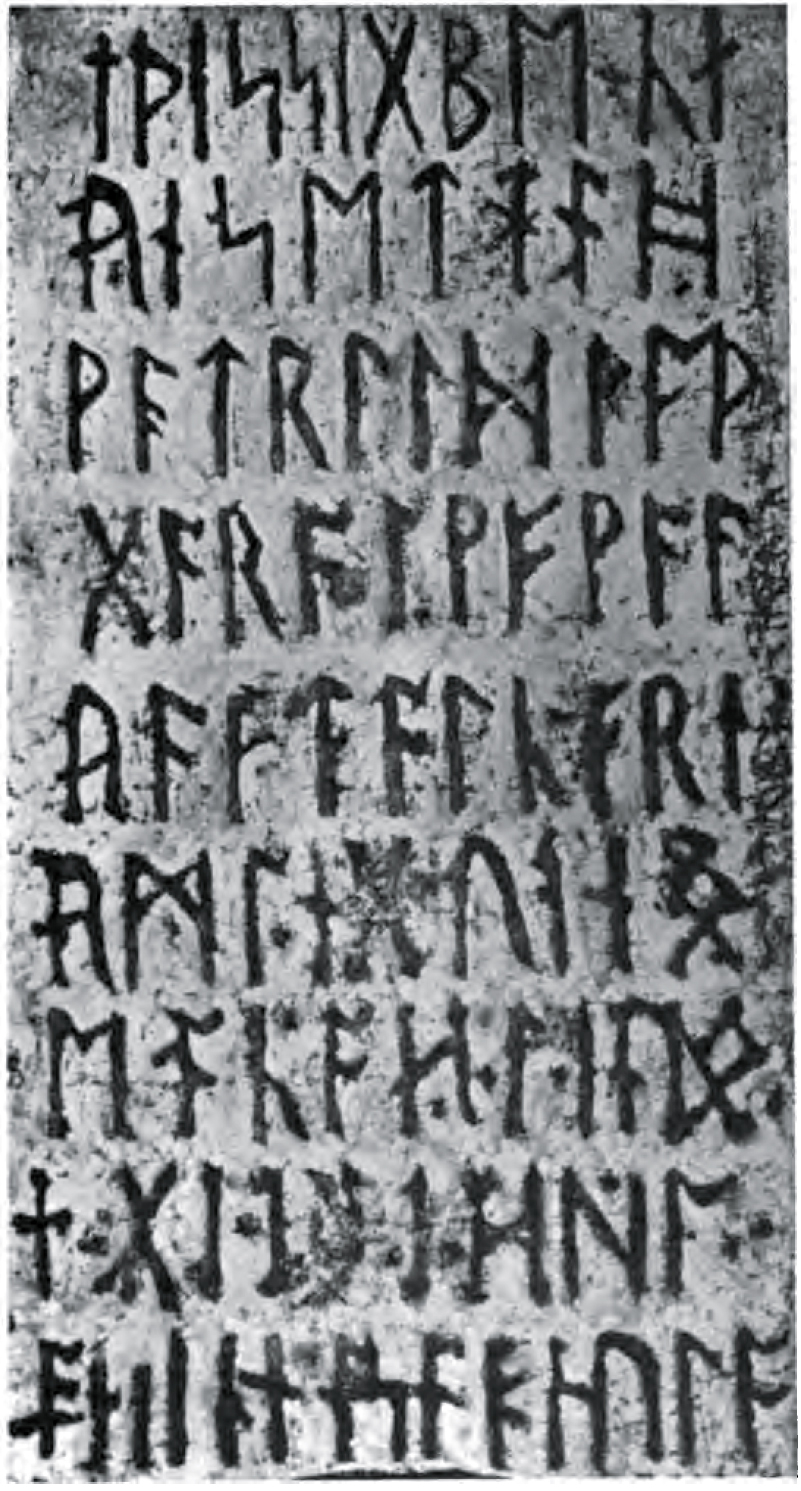
Bewcastle Cross, plate of runes on the west face

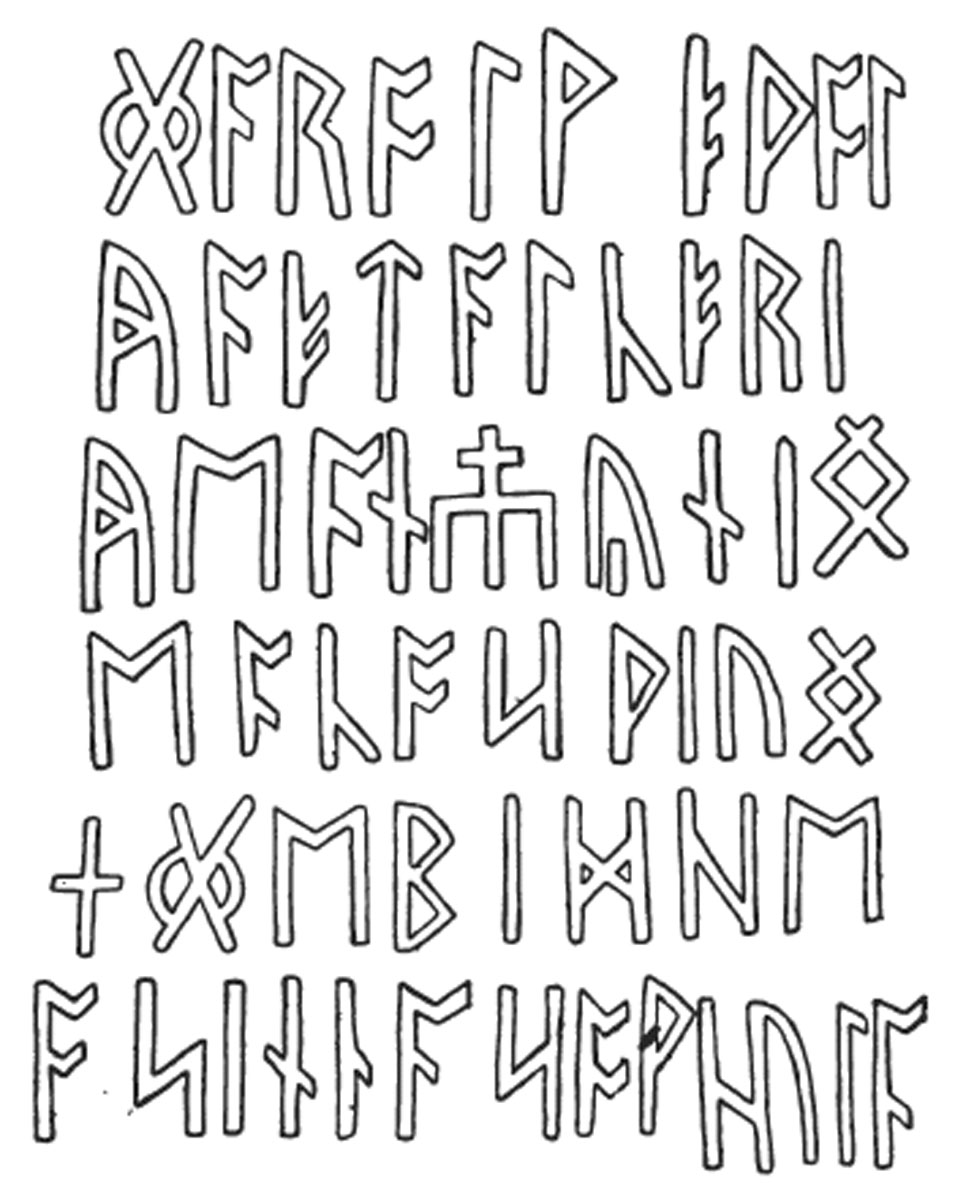
Bewcastle Cross, west face (the copy is neither complete, nor entirely accurate)

Scholars have contended that only the name Cynnburug is definitely decipherable on the cross. This inscription is on the north face, in the band between the first and second panels (from the bottom). Cyneburh was a wife of Aldfrith but this was a common name at the time and might not refer to Aldfrith's wife. Alfredir was king of Northumbria, and died around 664.

The north side may also contain runes that are barely decipherable above the fifth panel, but may refer to Wulfere, among others, who was a son of Penda, and king of Mercia.

The main runic inscription is located as the second panel from the bottom of the four panels on the west face. A few words on it remain legible, but most of the inscription is now indecipherable because of weathering. Several attempts have been made to interpret them. One such reads it as:

"thissig be(a)cn thun set(t)on hwa(e)tred waethgar alwfwolthu aft alcfrithu ean kuining eac oswiuing gebid heo sinna sawhula"
"This slender pillar Hwætred, Wæthgar, and Alwfwold set up in memory of Alcfrith, a king and son of Oswiu. Pray for their sins, their souls".

possibly referring to Egfrid, son of Oswy and brother of Alhfrith (also Alchfrith or Ealhfrith), who ascended to the throne in 670.

== Replica ==
A replica of the cross, including a guess at the missing part, is in the churchyard of the neo-Romanesque St Mary's Church at Wreay near Carlisle. The Wreay cross differs in style and detail from the original and has been described as a "reinvention".

== Gallery ==
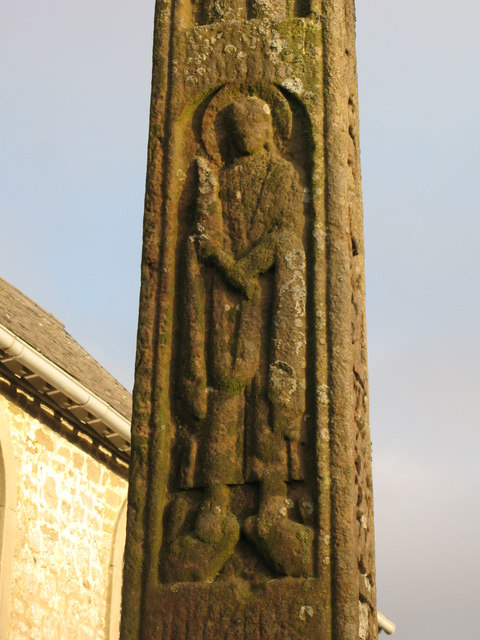
Christ treading on the beasts

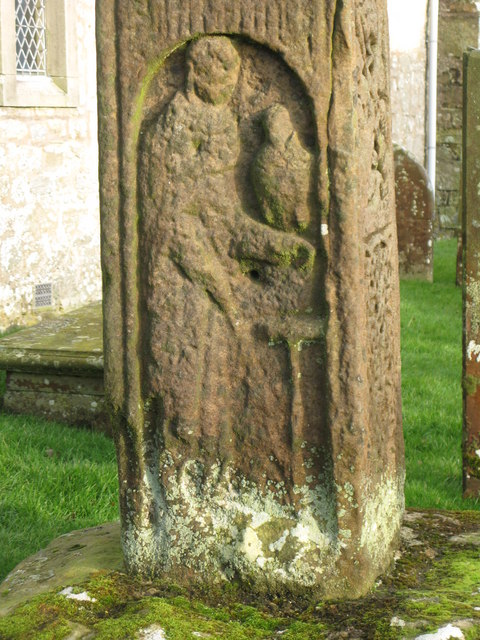
The falconer/St John figure

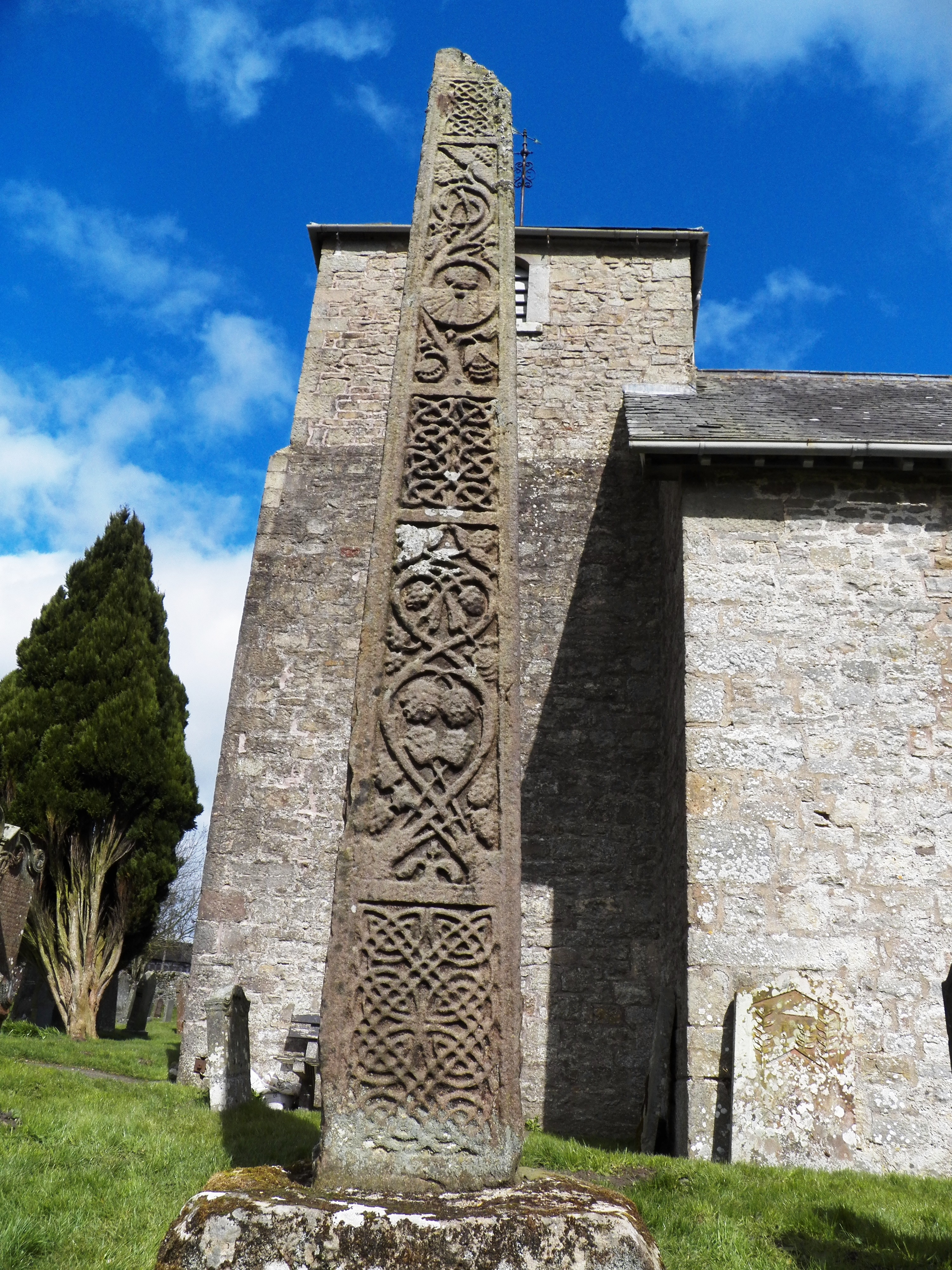
Bewcastle cross south perspective view

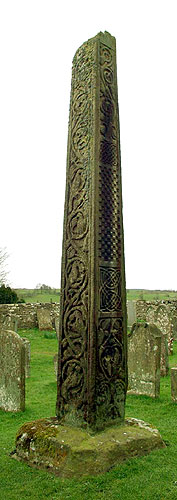
Bewcastle Cross - east and north faces

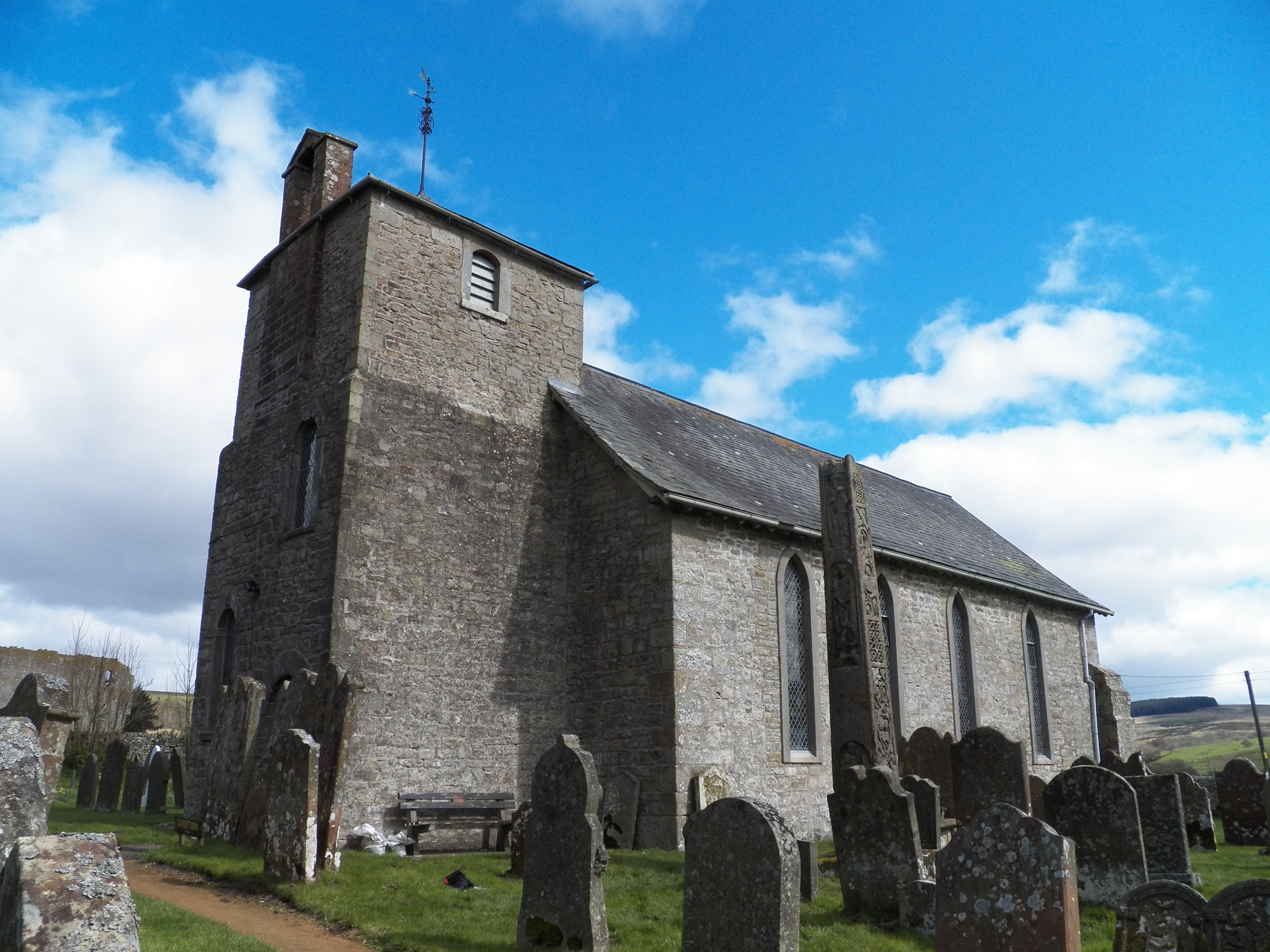
Bewcastle cross and church

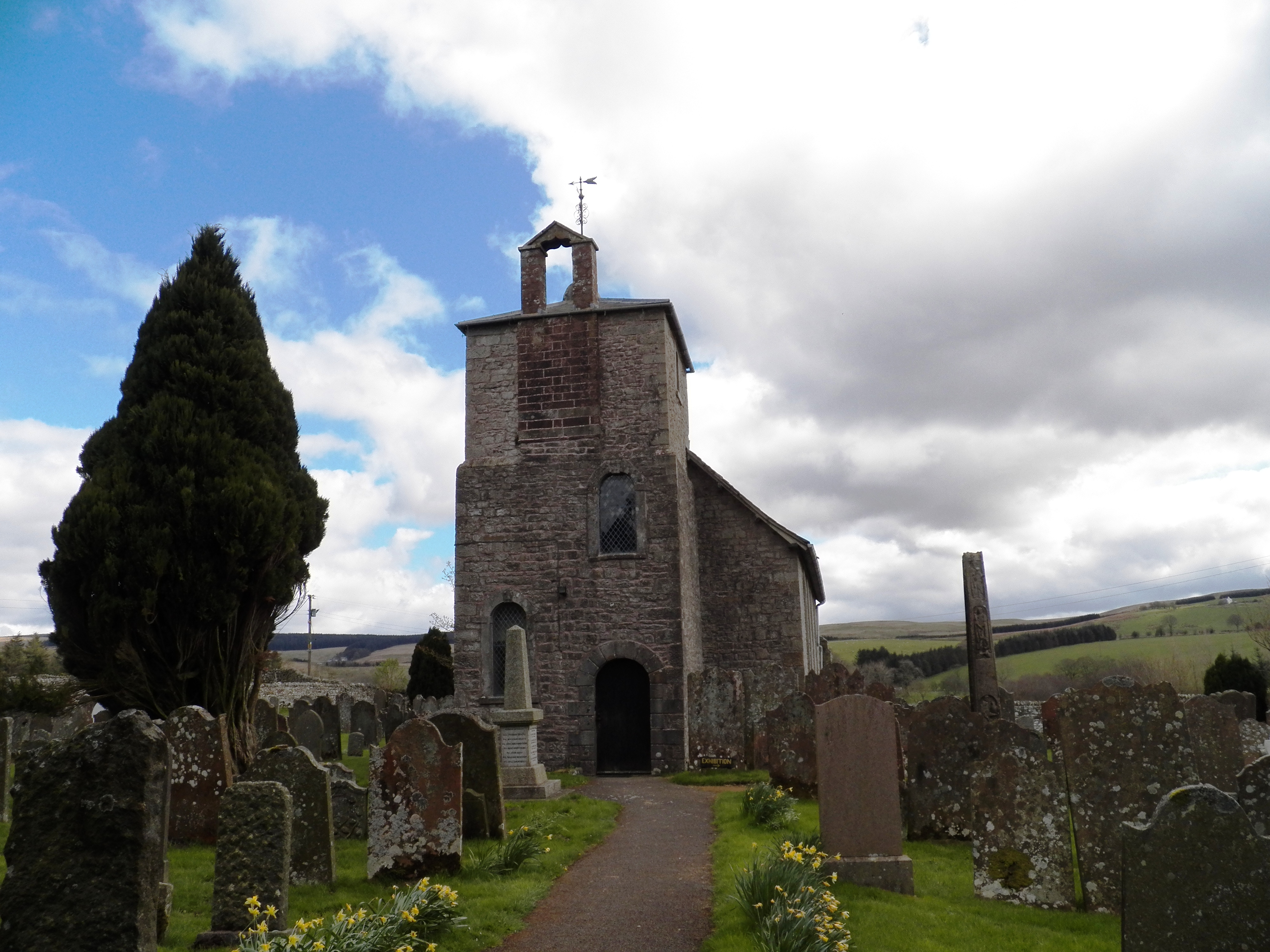
Bewcastle church and cross from the west

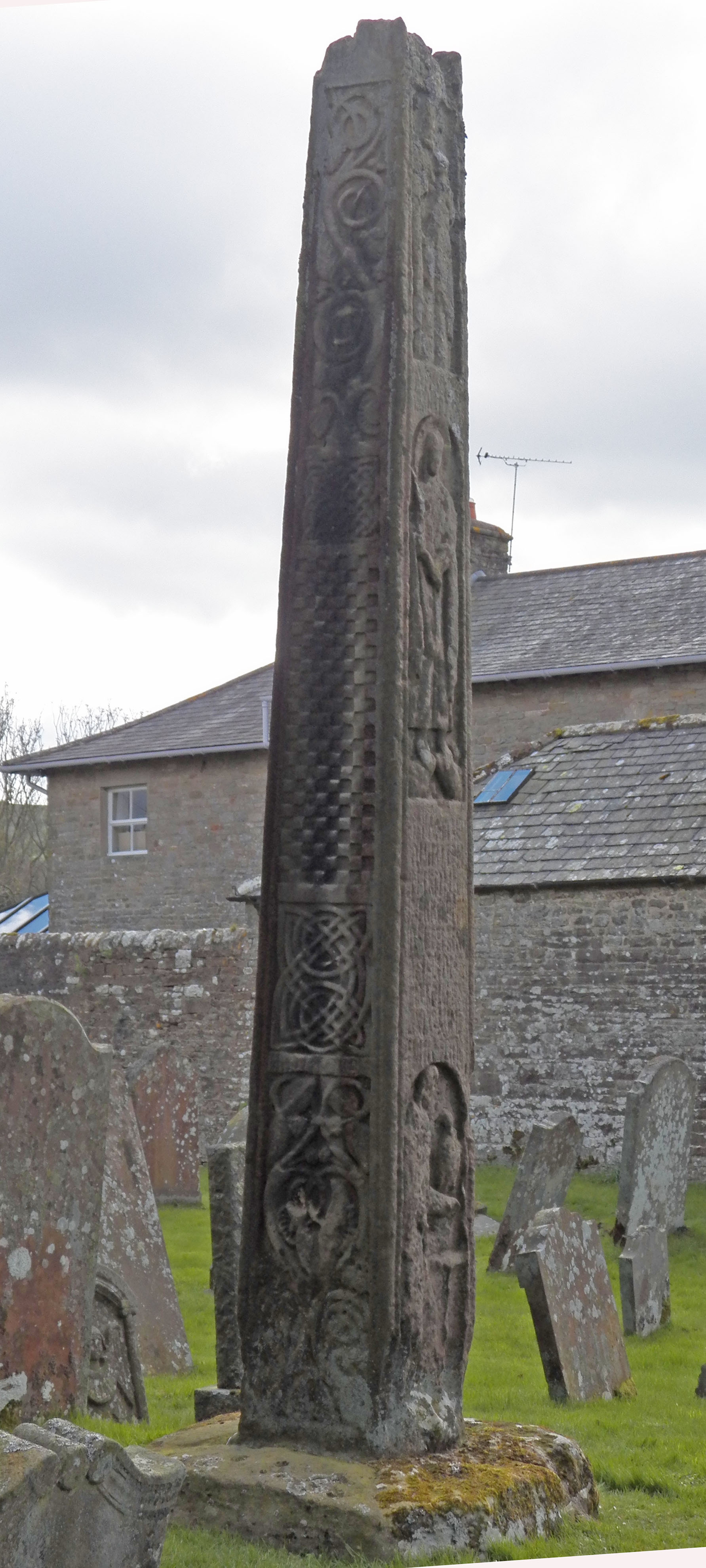
North and west faces

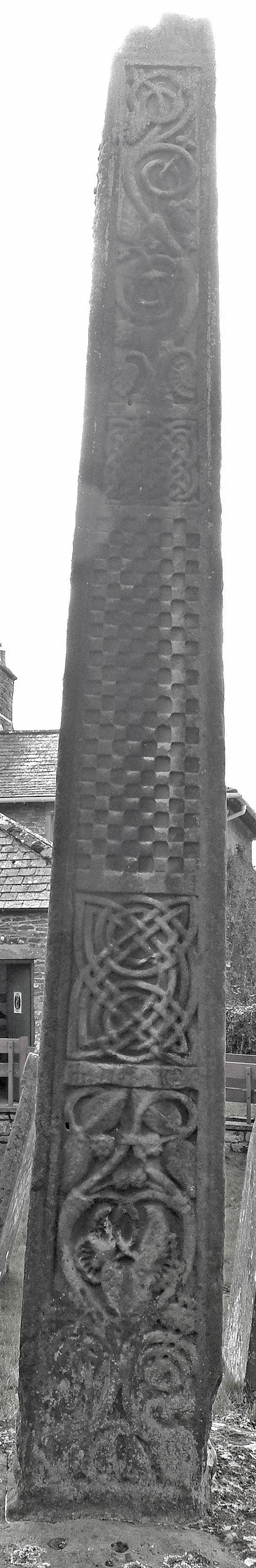
Enhanced view of the north face

== See also ==
- Easby Cross in the Victoria and Albert Museum, with Bewcastle and Ruthwell the best preserved Northumbrian cross
- Anglo-Saxon art
- Gosforth Cross
