= Temple Sowerby =

Village and civil parish in Cumbria, England

Coordinates: 54.637577°N 2.603852°W

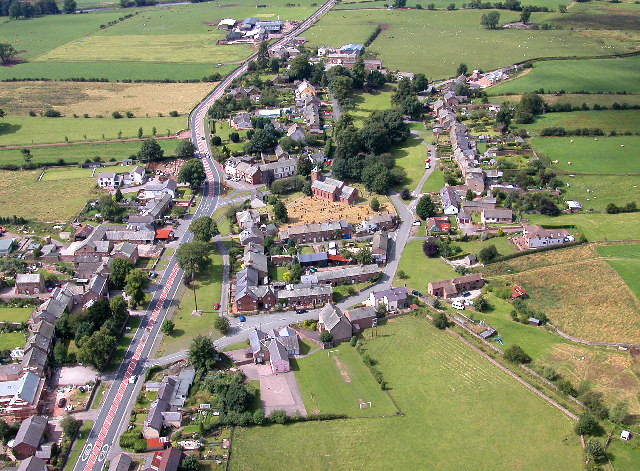
- Temple Sowerby

- Location within Cumbria
- Population: 528 (2011)
- OS grid reference: NY6127
- Civil parish: Temple Sowerby
- Unitary authority: Westmorland and Furness
- Ceremonial county: Cumbria
- Region: North West
- Country: England
- Sovereign state: United Kingdom
- Post town: PENRITH
- Postcode district: CA10
- Dialling code: 01768
- Police: Cumbria
- Fire: Cumbria
- Ambulance: North West
- UK Parliament: Westmorland and Lonsdale

Temple Sowerby is a village and civil parish in Cumbria, northern England. It is close to the main east–west A66 road about 8 miles (13 km) east of Penrith in the Eden Valley. At the 2011 census Temple Sowerby was grouped with Newbiggin giving a total population of 528.

At the centre of the village is the village green surrounded by cottages and houses, the village hall, Church of England primary school and a public house and hotel. Just outside the village stands the cricket pitch, a bowling green, the new doctors surgery and the Temple Sowerby garage. The National Trust property Acorn Bank is nearby, which dates back to the days of the crusades when a member of the Knights Templar lived there. The village's association with the Knights Templar gave it the name 'Temple'. Sowerby is Viking for "a homestead with poor soil".

== Transport ==
=== Railway ===
Temple Sowerby railway station (now a private house) was on the Eden Valley Railway between Cliburn and Kirkby Thore.

=== Bus ===
There is one bus route serving the village run by Stagecoach in Cumbria. The 563 to Penrith or to Kirkby Stephen via Appleby-in-Westmorland.

=== Road ===
The villagers of Temple Sowerby successfully campaigned for a bypass for the village. Construction began in the spring of 2006 and it was officially opened on Thursday 18 October 2007. There was a celebratory walk of the bypass route on Sunday 16 September 2007, allowing a unique opportunity to walk along the route before it was opened to traffic. The walk was extremely successful, with more than 500 people taking part.

== See also ==
- Listed buildings in Temple Sowerby
