= Temple Sowerby railway station =

Former railway station in Westmorland, England

Coordinates: 54.6276°N 2.6006°W

Temple Sowerby railway station was a railway station situated on the Eden Valley Railway between Penrith and Kirkby Stephen East. It served the village of Temple Sowerby. The station opened to passenger traffic on 9 June 1862, and closed on 7 December 1953. It is now a private residence.

Preceding station	Disused railways	Following station
Cliburn	Eden Valley Railway	Kirkby Thore
