= Clifton, Cumbria =

Village and civil parish in Cumbria, England

Coordinates: 54.632°N 2.723°W

Clifton
- Village and parish
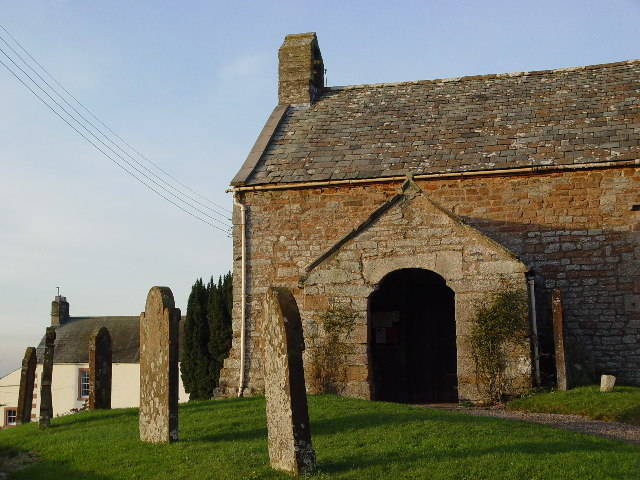
- Old Church

- Location in the former Eden District Location within Cumbria
- Population: 740 (2021)
- OS grid reference: NY5326
- Civil parish: Clifton
- Unitary authority: Westmorland and Furness
- Ceremonial county: Cumbria
- Region: North West
- Country: England
- Sovereign state: United Kingdom
- Post town: PENRITH
- Postcode district: CA10
- Dialling code: 01768
- Police: Cumbria
- Fire: Cumbria
- Ambulance: North West
- UK Parliament: Westmorland and Lonsdale

Clifton is a small linear village and civil parish in Cumbria, England. Historically part of Westmorland, it lies 3 miles (4.8 km) south east of Penrith.

== Geography ==
The civil parish of Clifton has its western boundary defined by the River Lowther, to the north and east lie the civil parishes of Brougham and Great Strickland, to the south is the civil parish of Lowther. The village of Clifton has a church, primary school, and a pub. Most of the hamlet of Clifton Dykes (on the C3047 road) also lies within the parish. The name of this was shown as Longchimney on the first edition Ordnance Survey map of 1897, and then as Clifton Dikes on the later second edition. The current spelling was settled on more recently.

== History ==
Clifton Dykes has been suggested as the (pre-Roman conquest) centre of the Carvetii, an Iron Age and Roman-period 'tribe', one that possibly led a resistance against Roman forces in 69 A.D. under the leadership of Venutius. This is based upon the evidence of a large (c.7 acre) Iron Age enclosure discovered there, plus assumptions about its strategic importance on the Eden Valley communication routeway. However, this has been disputed: the Carvetii may have always been centred on Carlisle even before the Romans set up Luguvalium and Venutius may not have been Carvetiian.

=== Clifton Moor Battle ===
Clifton Moor was the site, in 1745, of the final battle in England (and the last battle ever on English soil) between Bonnie Prince Charlie and the Duke of Cumberland.

The story of a local family, the Wybergs, whose property was forcibly sold by Oliver Cromwell in 1652, is told in Sir Walter Scott's novel, Waverley, which also features the battle on Clifton Moor.

=== St. Cuthbert's church ===
The local church, St Cuthbert's, contains the graves of 10 men killed in the battle of Clifton Moor. (The Scots dead are, reputedly, buried beneath a tree towards the southern end of the village). Some of the remains of St Cuthbert are also said to be languishing in the church. St Cuthbert's church contains a monument to a local benefactress, Eleanor Engayne, who died about the year 1395; according to the Topography and Directory of Westmorland, 1851, the manor of Clifton was given in the reign of Henry II, by Hugh de Morville, one of Thomas Becket's murderers, to Gilbert de Engayne, with whose descendants it continued till their heiress, Eleanor, in 1364, carried it in marriage to William de Wyberg.

=== Transport ===
There once were two railway stations, the 1846 Clifton station (later named Clifton and Lowther railway station) was on the Lancaster and Carlisle Railway (now part of the West Coast Main Line WCML), it closed to passengers in 1938.

Another station Clifton Moor station was on the Eden Valley Railway and opened 1863, closing in 1962. Confusingly Clifton & Lowther Station was at a hamlet known as Clifton Moor. The nearest station is now Penrith railway station.

At the boundary with the civil parish of Yanwath and Eamont Bridge where the west coast mainline railway crosses the river Lowther is Hugh's Crag Viaduct (also known as Lowther Viaduct, or Clifton Viaduct) built in 1846.

The M6 motorway now also runs through the parish.

=== Other ===
The former Wetheriggs Pottery also is within the civil parish, east of the village.

Clifton Hall is a 15th-century Pele tower.

== See also ==
- Listed buildings in Clifton, Cumbria
