= Gaisgill railway station =

Disused railway station in Cumbria, England

Coordinates: 54.4426°N 2.5554°W

Gaisgill
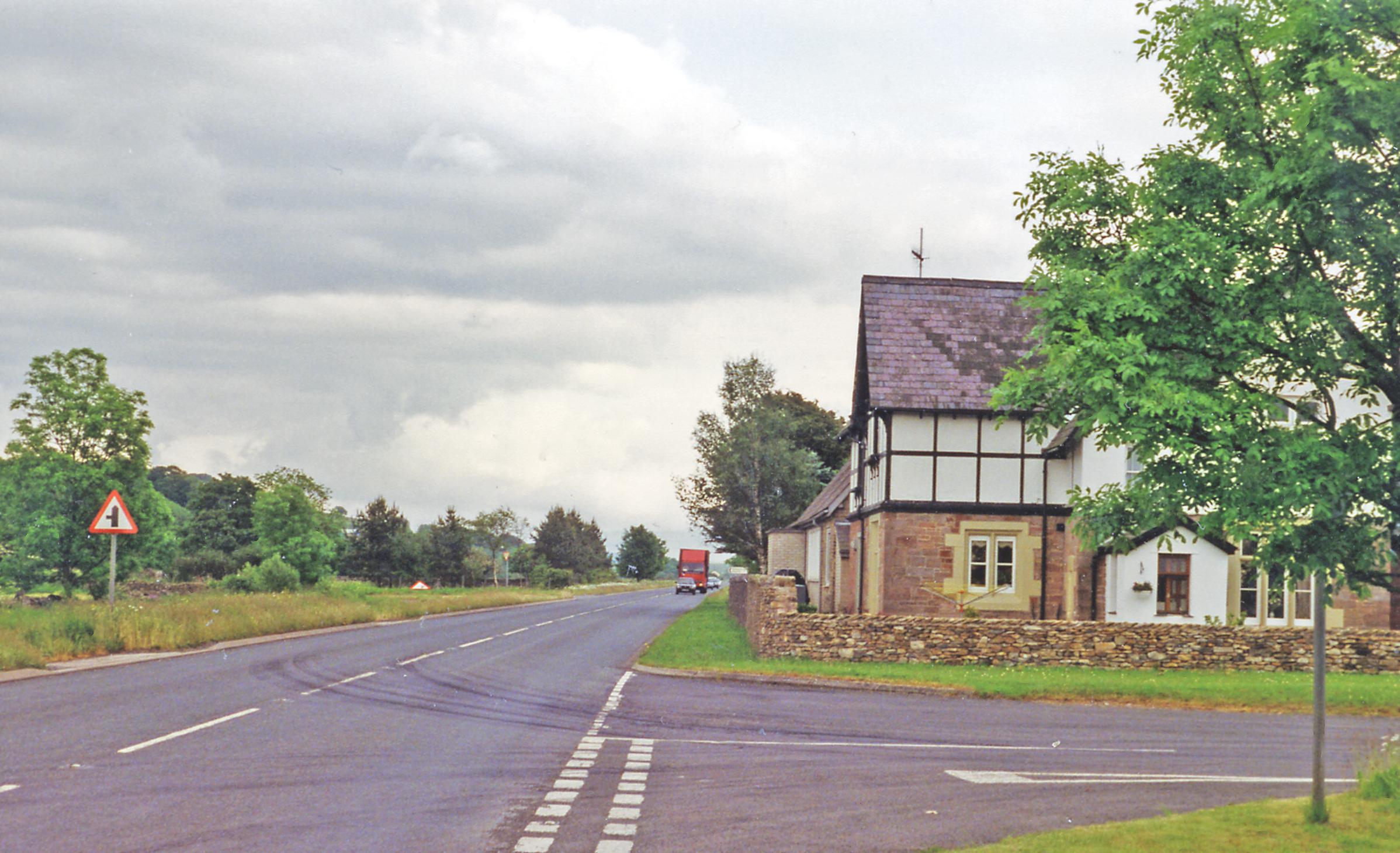
- View in 1996

General information
- Location: England
- Grid reference: SK863943
- Platforms: 2

Other information
- Status: Disused

History
- Original company: South Durham and Lancashire Union Railway
- Pre-grouping: North Eastern Railway
- Post-grouping: London and North Eastern Railway

Key dates
- 8 August 1861: Opened
- 1 December 1952: Closed
Location

Gaisgill railway station was situated on the South Durham & Lancashire Union Railway between Tebay and Kirkby Stephen East. It served the village of Gaisgill. The station opened to passenger traffic on 8 August 1861, and closed on 1 December 1952.

Preceding station	Disused railways	Following station
Tebay	South Durham & Lancashire Union Railway	Ravenstonedale
