= Kirkby Thore railway station =

Former railway station in Westmorland, England

Coordinates: 54.6189°N 2.5597°W

Kirkby Thore railway station was a railway station situated on the Eden Valley Railway between Penrith and Kirkby Stephen East. It served the village of Kirkby Thore. The station opened to passenger traffic on 9 June 1862, and closed on 7 December 1953.

The station was host to camping coach from 1936 to 1939 and may have had a coach visiting in 1934 and 1935.

The track has been dismantled and the A66 road now uses the route of the railway at this point. The former A66 route past the station is now a haulage yard.

Although the village is also close to the Settle-Carlisle Railway, and there is an active private siding and goods yard, there has never been a passenger station on that line at this point.

| Preceding station | Disused railways | Following station |
|---|---|---|
| Temple Sowerby | Eden Valley Railway | Appleby East |
