= Musgrave railway station =

Former railway station in Westmorland, England

Coordinates: 54.5158°N 2.3649°W

Musgrave railway station was a railway station situated on the Eden Valley Railway and located between Penrith and Kirkby Stephen East, England.

== History ==
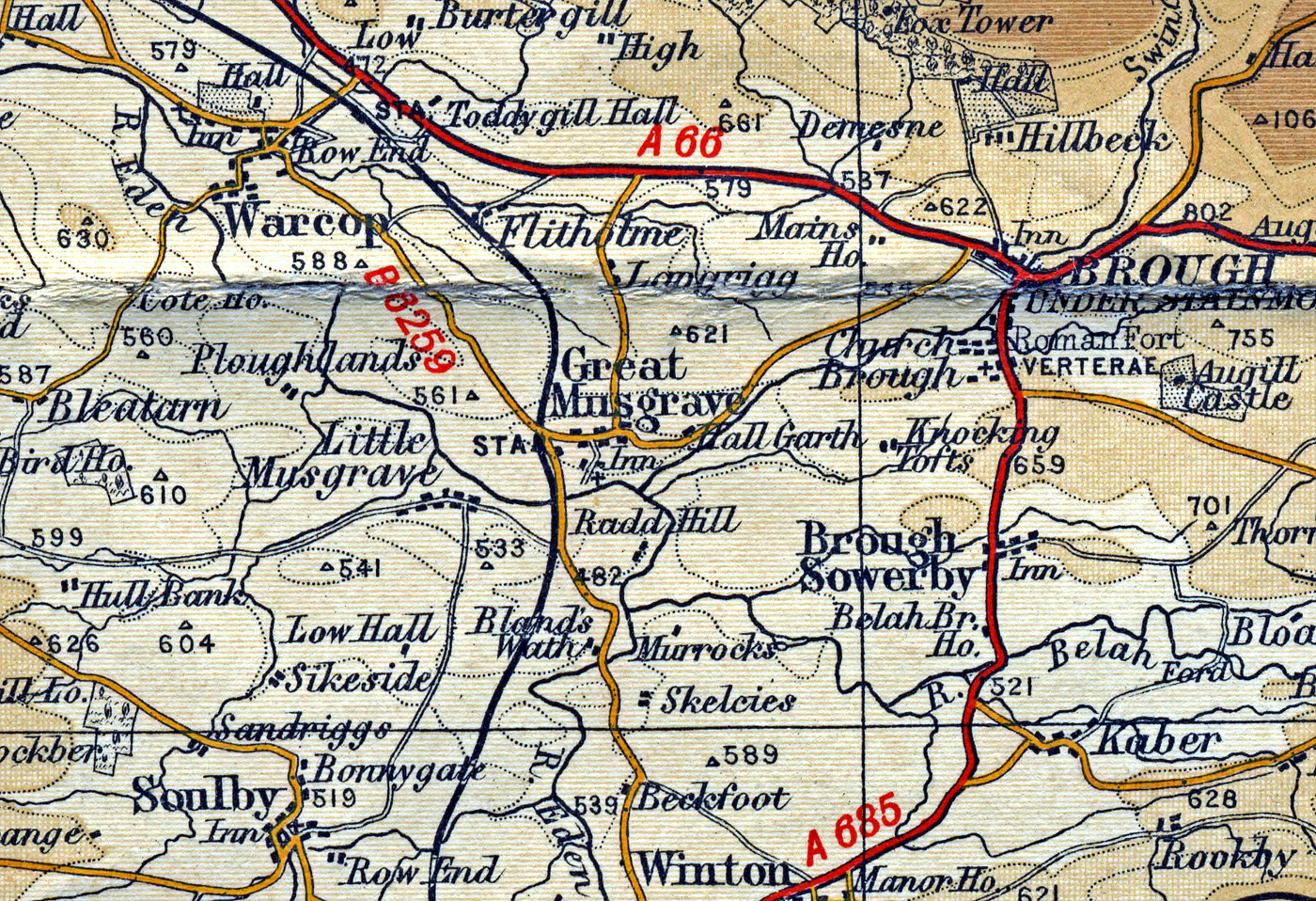
1935 Map showing location of the station

The railway line and station were built by the Eden Valley Railway (EVR). The line opened for mineral traffic on 8 April 1862 and for passengers on 9 June 1862. The station served the villages of Great Musgrave and Little Musgrave and also nearby Brough. The EVR was worked from the outset by the Stockton and Darlington Railway (S&DR) which absorbed the EVR on 1 January 1863. The S&DR was in turn absorbed by the North Eastern Railway (NER) on 13 July 1863.

On the Railway grouping of 1923 the working was taken over by the London and North Eastern Railway. Under nationalization on 1 January 1948 British Railways took over, but closed the station to both passengers and goods traffic on 3 November 1952.

=== Great Musgrave Bridge ===
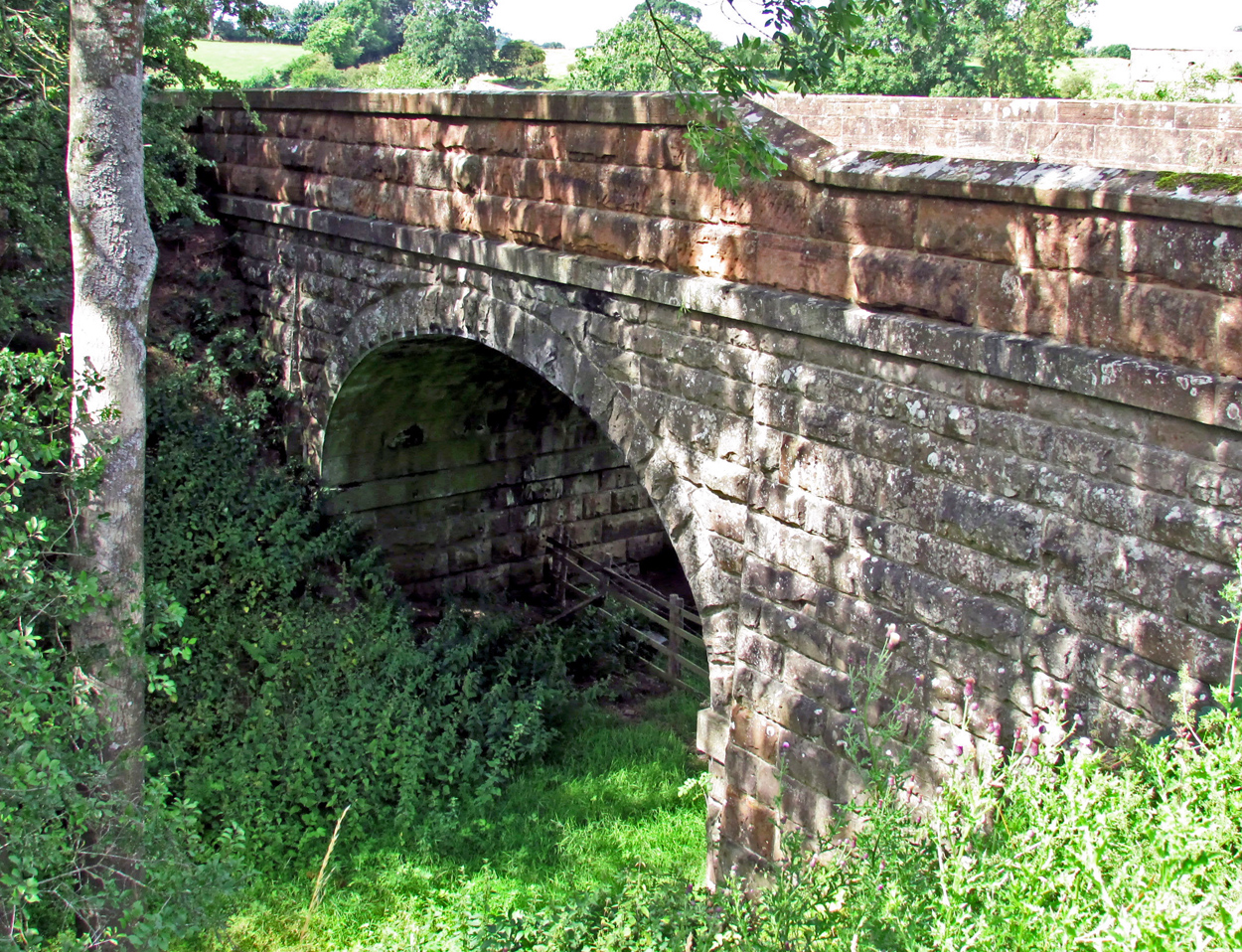
Surviving bridge over railway cutting just north of the station in 2016

In May 2021, the space under the road bridge at Great Musgrave, north of the former railway station, was filled with 1600 tonnes of aggregate and concrete by Highways England, ostensibly for safety reasons. The bridge spanned a five-mile section of trackbed which local rail enthusiasts hoped to restore, linking the Eden Valley and Stainmore railways to create an 11-mile tourist line between Appleby and Kirkby Stephen. Accused of 'vandalism', Highways England was forced to apply for retrospective planning permission for the Musgrave works, with Eden District council receiving 913 objections and only two expressions of support, and government intervention to pause HE's plans to infill dozens of other Victorian bridges across England. Advised by planning officers to reject the application, the council's planning committee unanimously refused retrospective planning permission on 16 June 2022. Restoration of the Musgrave bridge to its former condition would cost an estimated £431,000, in addition to the £124,000 spent on the initial infilling work. Work began in August 2023 to remove the infill material.

After the Great Musgrave outcry, National Highways developed a new way to assess the abandoned rail bridges and tunnels it controls, with decisions reviewed in collaboration with experts from heritage, environmental and active travel sectors.

== Passenger facilities and services ==
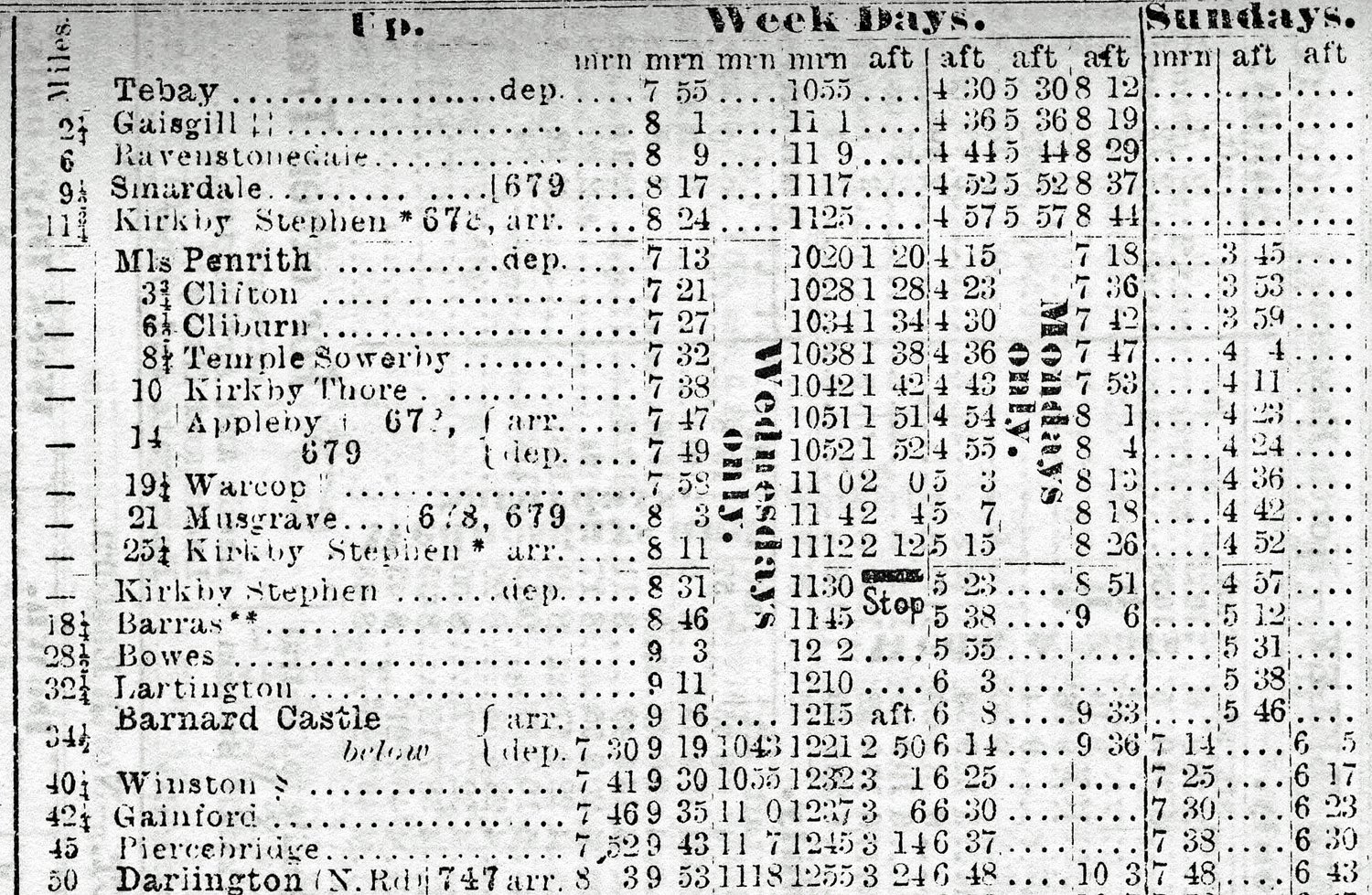
1922 NER timetable showing passenger services through the station

A stationmaster's house and brick-built station building were provided on the single platform. There was a single goods siding. In July 1922 the NER operated five trains in each direction on each weekday, starting from Penrith which called to drop and pick up passengers and parcels. One of the up trains continued via Kirkby Stephen to Barnard Castle and Darlington. The other up trains terminated at Kirkby Stephen, three providing a connection into Tebay to Darlington trains.

== See also ==
- Kirkby Stephen East railway station

Preceding station	Disused railways	Following station
Warcop	Eden Valley Railway	Kirkby Stephen East
