= South Durham and Lancashire Union Railway =

English railway company

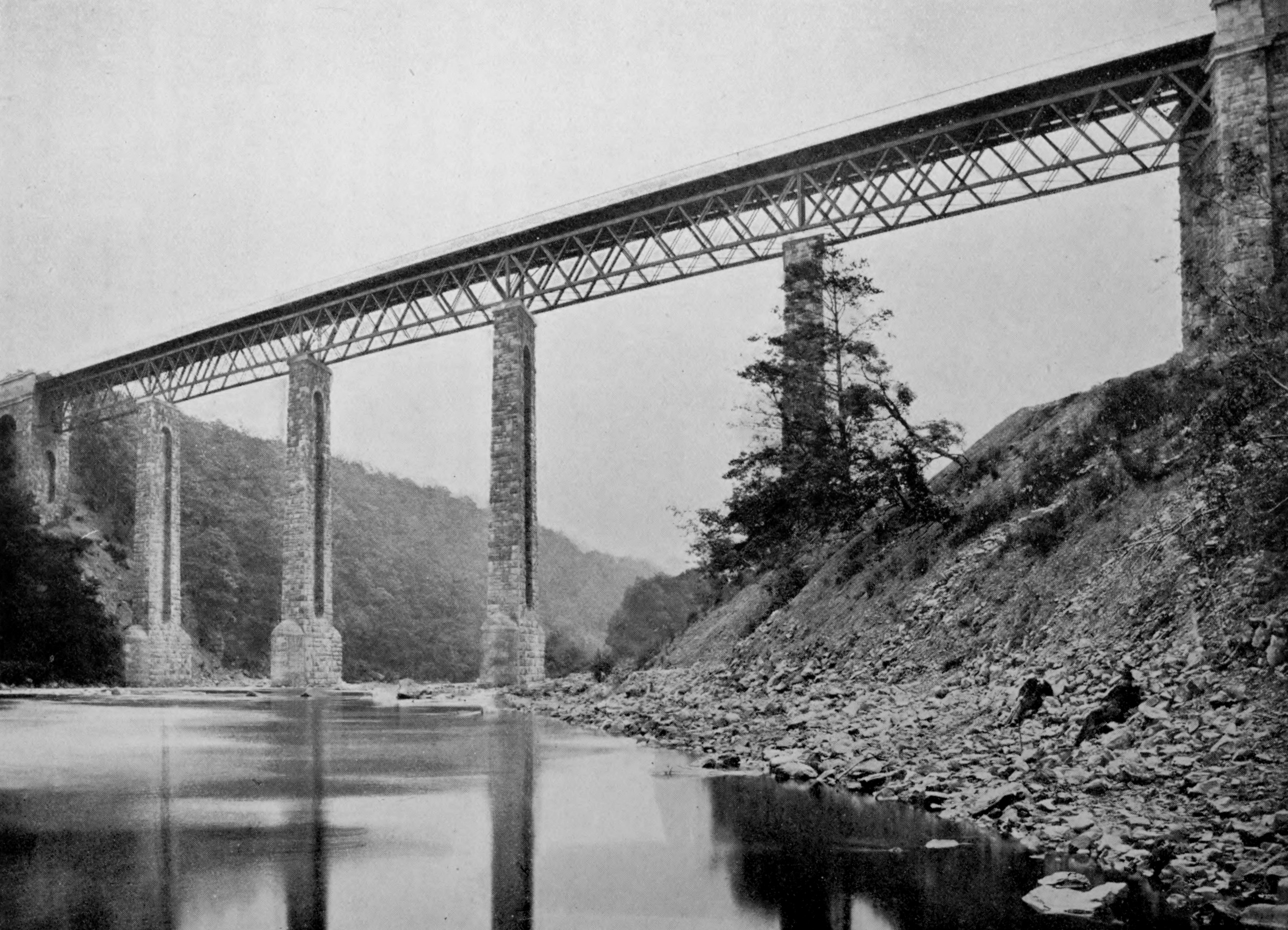
The viaduct over the Tees Valley in 1858

The South Durham and Lancashire Union Railway (SD&LUR) built a railway line linking the Stockton and Darlington Railway near Bishop Auckland with the Lancaster and Carlisle Railway (the West Coast Main Line) at Tebay, via Barnard Castle, Stainmore Summit and Kirkby Stephen. The line opened in 1861 and became known as the Stainmore Line.

The Stockton and Darlington absorbed the SD&LUR, and the Stockton and Darlington became a constituent of the North Eastern Railway. The line closed in stages between 1952 and 1962. A short section of the line at Kirkby Stephen East station has been restored by the Stainmore Railway Company.

== Origins ==
Northern Counties Union Railway Act 1846
- Act of Parliament
- Parliament of the United Kingdom
- Long title: An Act for making a Railway from the Great North of England Railway at Thirsk in the North Riding of Yorkshire to the Lancaster and Carlisle Railway at Clifton in Westmorland, and a Railway from Bishop Auckland in the County of Durham to the Lancaster and Carlisle Railway at Tebay in Westmorland, to be called "The Northern Counties Union Railway."
- Citation: 9 & 10 Vict. c. cclx

Dates
- Royal assent: 27 July 1846

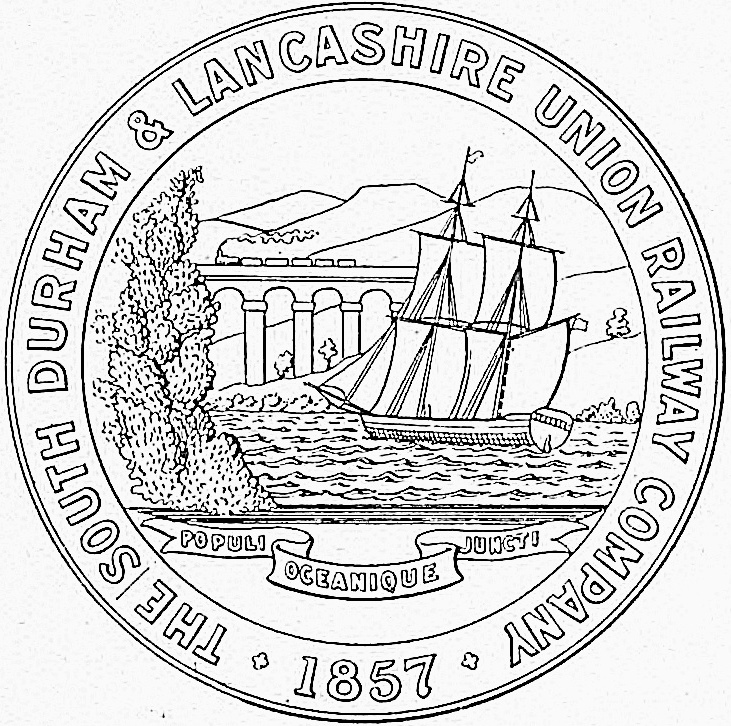
The seal of the South Durham and Lancashire Union Railway

When the Lancaster and Carlisle Railway (L&CR) was approved in June 1844 there were a number of schemes for a railway over the Pennines. The York and Carlisle Railway proposed a route from the East Coast Main Line (ECML) at Northallerton via Richmond, Barnard Castle, the Tees Valley, Stainmore and the Eden Valley to the L&CR at Clifton. A rival scheme, the Yorkshire and Glasgow Union Railway, left the ECML at Thirsk, crossed the Pennines to Hawes, then Kirkby Stephen, Appleby and so reached Clifton. The Leeds and Carlisle Railway would have left the Leeds Northern Railway near Headingley and passed through Wharfedale to Hawes and the Eden Valley. These schemes came together as the Northern Counties Union Railway, which was given authority by the Northern Counties Union Railway Act 1846 (9 & 10 Vict. c. cclx) for a 69 miles (111 km) line from Thirsk to Clifton and a 50 1/4 miles (80.9 km) line from Bishop Auckland to Tebay. However, it would have cost £35,000 to pass through the estate of the Duke of Cleveland between Bishop Auckland and Barnard Castle, and it was a condition of the enabling act that work on the two lines must be simultaneous. Attempts in 1847 and 1848 to repeal this clause failed and the company failed to raise the necessary finance to start work, its powers lapsed and was wound up.

In summer 1850 Henry Bolckow and John Vaughan discovered a seam of iron ore at Eston, North Yorkshire. They opened a mine and the S&DR started hauling ironstone to their blast furnaces west of Bishop Auckland. By 1851 Derwent Iron had opened a mine in the area and began moving ironstone 54 miles (87 km) to Consett. The iron ore from Cleveland is high in phosphorus and needs to be mixed with purer ores, such as those on the west coast in Cumberland and Lancashire. In the early 1850s this ore was travelling the long way round via Newcastle and Carlisle from the Barrow-in-Furness area, and Durham coke was returning. A railway to serve Barnard Castle was proposed in 1852 that bypassed the Duke of Cleveland's estate, running from junction near North Road station and following the River Tees to Barnard Castle. An application in 1852 failed, but the 15 1/4-mile (24.5 km) Darlington and Barnard Castle Railway Act 1854 was given royal assent on 3 July 1854 and the railway opened on 8 July 1856.

South Durham and Lancashire Union Railway Act 1857
- Act of Parliament
- Parliament of the United Kingdom
- Long title: An Act for making a Railway commencing by a Junction with the Haggarleazes Branch of the Stockton and Darlington Railway near the Lands Colliery in the County of Durham, and terminating by a Junction with the Lancaster and Carlisle Railway at or near Tebay in the County of Westmoreland; and for making Arrangements with the Stockton and Darlington Railway Company; and for other Purposes.
- Citation: 20 & 21 Vict. c. xl

Dates
- Royal assent: 13 July 1857

Text of statute as originally enacted

Both the South Durham and Lancashire Union Railway (SD&LUR) and the Eden Valley Railway (EVR) companies were formed on 20 September 1856. The SD&LUR route left the Stockton and Darlington Railway's Haggerleases branch west of West Auckland, then crossed the Pennines to Tebay via Barnard Castle, Kirkby Stephen. The route was surveyed by Thomas Bouch and the company received permission in the South Durham and Lancashire Union Railway Act 1857 (20 & 21 Vict. c. xl) on 13 July 1857. The EVR had a choice of following the east and west bank of the Eden and the cheaper route on the east bank was chosen even though it was a mile longer. The Eden Valley Railway Act 1858 (21 & 22 Vict. c. xiv) received royal assent on 21 May 1858, the line turning south as it joined the main line at Clifton on the insistence of the L&CR so it could not be used to bypass its allies, the London North Western Railway, to the south.

== Construction and opening ==
The ceremonial cutting of the first sod for the SD&LUR was at Kirkby Stephen on 25 August 1857, and that for the EVR was at Appleby on 28 July 1858. Land for two tracks purchased, but a single track line was laid. Bouch had laid out an economical route that followed the contours and avoided tunnels, but there were formidable gradients up to the 1,370 feet (420 m) high Stainmore Summit. Valleys were crossed by viaducts, including three made from wrought-iron that crossed the Tees, Deepdale and Belah rivers and cost a total of £77,400. The viaducts at Tees Valley, Deepdale, Belah and Smardale Gill were built wide enough for two tracks.

Viaducts, from east to west
Name	Coordinates	Type	Total Length	Spans	Maximum height
Gaunless	54.6221°N 1.8024°W	Iron	640 feet (200 m)	4	93 feet (28 m)
Langleydale	54.5972°N 1.8941°W	Stone	411 feet (125 m)	9	76 feet (23 m)
Forthburn	54.5805°N 1.9071°W	Stone	248 feet (76 m)	9	43 feet (13 m)
Percy Beck	54.5528°N 1.9247°W	Stone	260 feet (79 m)	8	66 feet (20 m)
Tees	54.5528°N 1.9414°W	Iron	732 feet (223 m)	7	132 feet (40 m)
Deepdale	54.5422°N 1.9763°W	Iron	740 feet (230 m)	11	161 feet (49 m)
Mousegill	54.5061°N 2.2377°W	Stone	243 feet (74 m)	6	106 feet (32 m)
Belah	54.4895°N 2.2493°W	Iron	1,070 feet (330 m)	16	196 feet (60 m)
Aitygill	54.4882°N 2.2859°W	Stone	324 feet (99 m)	9	94 feet (29 m)
Merrygill	54.4702°N 2.3341°W	Stone	366 feet (112 m)	9	78 feet (24 m)
Podgill	54.4663°N 2.3379°W	Stone	466 feet (142 m)	8	60 feet (18 m)
Smardale	54.4566°N 2.4231°W	Stone	553 feet (169 m)	6	90 feet (27 m)

The route between West Auckland and Barnard Castle was changed after negotiations with the Duke of Cleveland, and a southwards facing junction was built at Tebay after protracted negotiations with the L&CR. A new station was built to replace the terminus at Barnard Castle. A mineral train ran between Barnard Castle and Barras on 26 March 1861, and mineral traffic worked through to Tebay from 4 July 1861. After an opening ceremony on 7 August 1861, the SD&LUR was open to passengers the following day.

Stations opened on the line at:

- Evenwood
- Cockfield Fell
- Barnard Castle, replacing the original terminus
- Lartington
- Bowes
- Barras
- Kirkby Stephen (Later Kirkby Stephen East)
- Smardale
- Ravenstonedale
- Gaisgill

The S&DR worked traffic from the start, and initially two return services a day were provided between Redcar (except one early morning that started from Middlesbrough) and Tebay via Darlington. Two locomotives, No. 160 Brougham and No. 161 Lowther, had been built for the line in 1860 by Stephenson and Co. with a 4-4-0 wheel arrangement and enclosed cab. William Bouch designed four more that were made in 1862; these were similar but without the cabs that were unpopular with the crews. Kirkby Stephen became a junction station when the EVR opened to mineral traffic on 8 April 1862 and passengers began to be carried on 9 June 1862. The line between West Auckland and Barnard Castle opened for minerals in July 1863 and passengers on 1 August 1863.

== Amalgamation ==
In 1859 a company had been formed to link the Newcastle and Carlisle Railway with the S&DR via the Derwent Valley; by 1860 this had grown into the Newcastle, Derwent and Weardale Railway, which now bypassed the S&DR and linked with the SD&LUR, and the North British and the London and North Western (LNWR) railways were providing two thirds of the capital. The LNWR proposed to build warehouses in Hartlepool and buy shares in the West Hartlepool Railway. The North Eastern Railway (NER), formed in 1854 by amalgamation, at the time was the largest railway company in the country and controlled the East Coast Main Line from Knottingley, south of York, through Darlington to Berwick-upon-Tweed. When they approached the S&DR with a proposal to merge, the S&DR deciding they preferred a merger with the NER than eventually become part of the LNWR, entered negotiations. Opposed by the NER, the Newcastle, Derwent and Weardale Railway bill was approved by the House of Commons in 1861, although the line was eventually rejected by the House of Lords. The SD&LUR and EVR merged with the S&DR by the Stockton and Darlington Railway (Amalgamation) Act 1862 (25 & 26 Vict. c. cvi) on 30 June 1862, and the S&DR and North Eastern Railway merged on 13 July 1863.

== Operations ==
Traffic increased rapidly and the line was doubled, starting with the section from Bowes to the summit at Stainmore in 1866, followed by the line from Barnard Castle to the Tees Valley Junction. The NER opened the Tees Valley Railway to Middleton-in-Teesdale in 1868. Doubling of the line to Tebay, except for Belah to Kirkby Stephen and Kirkby Stephen to Sandy Bank had been approved by 1875. The section between Belah and Kirkby Stephen was approved in 1889, and this involved the doubling of the Aitygill, Merrygill and Podgill viaducts. Smardale Gill Viaduct was built wide enough for double track, but single track was laid to ease the curve.

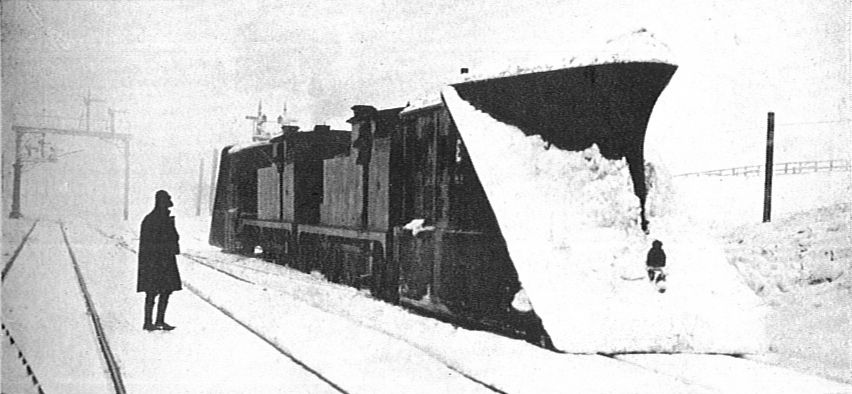
Snowploughs on the line

At the end of the 19th century the line would be typically used by twenty freight trains, mostly mineral traffic. Westbound, 'double load' trains of 32 wagons would be assisted on the rising gradient by a locomotive at the rear. At the summit, where there was a reservoir to provide water, trains would be split into two for the descent. Up to 50 empty wagons could be managed on the return journey, the assisting locomotive then running light from the summit to Barnard Castle. Snow could a problem on the line, especially between the summit and Belah, and the line was closed by the weather in 1942, 1947 and 1955.

As a result of the Railways Act 1921, on 1 January 1923 the North Eastern Railway became part of the London and North Eastern Railway (LNER). Until 1932 there were three passenger trains a day between Darlington and Tebay, with five trains a day between Kirkby Stephen and Penrith, and the line was also used for specials from Newcastle to Blackpool.

The 1947 LNER timetable shows three trains a day between Darlington and Penrith, and another between Darlington and Kirkby Stephen, via the Darlington and Barnard Castle route. There were three trains a day from Darlington to Barnard Castle that continued on the branch to Middleton in Teesdale, and two a day between Kirkby Stephen and Tebay. There were four services a day between Bishop Auckland and Barnard Castle, three of which continued to Middleton in Teesdale.

== British Railways and closure ==
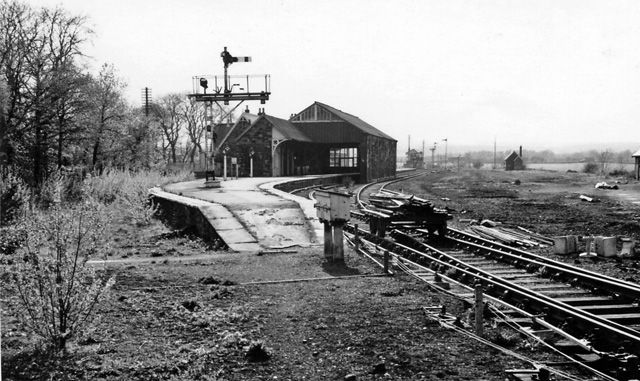
Barnard Castle station in 1965, just after closure

Britain's railways were nationalised on 1 January 1948 and the lines were placed under the control of British Railways. In the early 1950s control was divided between the North Eastern and London Midland regions with Kirkby Stephen as the boundary. Local passenger trains were withdrawn between Kirkby Stephen and Tebay on 1 December 1952, although steam-hauled summer Saturday services from the north-east to Blackpool continued to use the route until the end of the 1961 holiday season. The 1955 Modernisation Plan, known formally as the "Modernisation and Re-Equipment of the British Railways", was published in December 1954. With the aim of increasing speed and reliability, steam trains were replaced with electric and diesel traction and Diesel Multiple Units took over local passenger services on the line in February 1958.

A proposal to close the line between Barnard Castle and Penrith was published at the end of 1959. Freight was diverted via Newcastle and Carlisle from July 1960 and, despite objections, the last train ran on 20 January 1962. The passenger service was withdrawn on the remaining section of the former SD&LUR between Bishop Auckland and Barnard Castle on 12 June 1962. In 1963 Dr Beeching published his report "The Reshaping of British Railways", which recommended closing the network's least used stations and lines. This listed the route Darlington–Barnard Castle–Middleton-in-Teesdale and the former Darlington and Barnard Castle Railway and Tees Valley Railway to Middleton in Teesdale closed to passengers on 30 November 1964 and completely on 5 April 1965.

== Subsequent developments ==
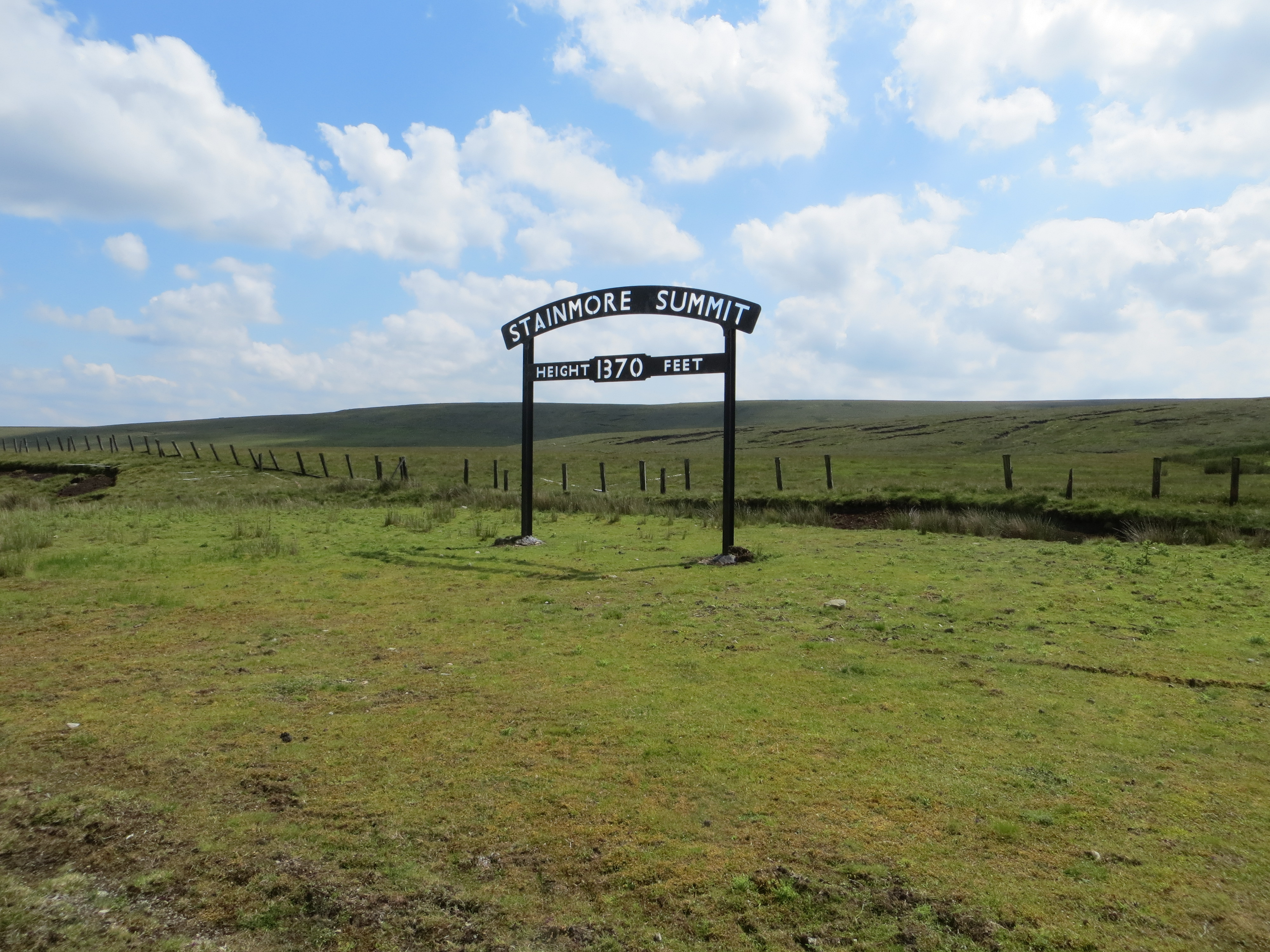
Replica Stainmore Summit sign

The Stainmore Railway Company, based at Kirkby Stephen East station, were formed in 2000. They have re-instated a short section of the former SD&LUR line west of the main station building, which has also been restored by volunteers. Public passenger services were launched in August 2011 as part of a Stainmore 150 gala, which celebrated 150 years since the SD&LUR was opened. As part of this celebration, a replica Stainmore Summit sign was cast and was erected in the position of the original.

Parts of the line have also been preserved as public footpaths by the Northern Viaduct Trust, who also care for Smardale Gill, Podgill and Merrygill viaducts which all survive. Another small section of the line, in close proximity to the current operating limits of the Stainmore Railway Company, has been converted into Waitby Greenriggs Nature Reserve, which is owned and operated by the Cumbria Wildlife Trust.
