= Stainmore Railway Company =

Railway preservation company

Coordinates: 54.471°N 2.348°W

- Formerly: Stainmore Locomotive Company
- Company type: Non-profit organisation limited by shares
- Founded: 29 March 2000
- Website: kirkbystepheneast.co.uk

Stainmore Railway Company is a volunteer-run, non-profit preservation company formed in 2000 with the aim of restoring Kirkby Stephen East railway station in Kirkby Stephen, Cumbria, England. In 1997 a company called Stainmore Properties Ltd. was formed, with the intention to convert KSE into an authentic North Eastern Railway focused heritage centre representing the early 1950s. The Stainmore Railway Company was subsequently formed to restore the site. Since then essential repairs have been made to the roof and station, a number of rooms have been restored and a short section of track has been laid along the formation of the old Eden Valley Railway, with some sidings and yard infrastructure within the station area and surroundings. A quantity of rolling stock that is authentic to the site has also been brought in.

The station was formerly on the South Durham & Lancashire Union Railway, and was also the eastern terminus of the Eden Valley Railway. The company has re-instated approximately a third of a mile (0.54km) of running line on the former Eden Valley Railway formation to allow train running. There is the eventual aim of joining up with the heritage Eden Valley Railway (at Warcop).

August 2011 marked the 150th anniversary of the railway. To commemorate this occasion a series of events were held during 2011, leading up to 'Stainmore 150', a large gala, where Steve Davis, the then-head of the National Railway Museum, drove the first fare-paying passenger train from the station in over 50 years, hauled by ex. Kirkby Stephen locomotive BR Standard Class 2 2-6-0 no. 78019. In 2013 the Stainmore Railway Company began its first operating season, running Peckett and Sons 0-4-0 'F C Tingey' on selected weekends. In 2014 this was joined by Yorkshire Engine Company 'Stanton 50' which operates diesel hauled trains on some weekends when there is no steam service.

In June 2017 it was announced that a joint Heritage Lottery Fund bid between the Stainmore Railway Company and the Locomotive Conservation and Learning Trust, to restore both LNER J21 65033 and an ex. North Eastern Railway stores van, no. 5523, as an interpretation vehicle to travel with the locomotive, had been successful. As part of the joint bid, it was agreed that, once restoration is completed, the locomotive will be based at Kirkby Stephen East and become the project's flagship locomotive. As a result of this, work is currently underway to create a vastly more flexible track layout within the station yard, as well as building a new restoration shed and authentic locomotive watering facilities. Part of the new work means that a short stretch of the former South Durham & Lancashire Union Railway formation across Bridge 149 has been re-instated.

== Locomotives ==
| Class | Number (&Name) | Wheels | Image | Status | Notes |
|---|---|---|---|---|---|
| Peckett and Sons; OY1-S | No. 2084 FC Tingey | 0-4-0ST | | Under Repair | Ex-Courtaulds, North Wales. Donated to the Llangollen Railway, but sold via a scrap merchant to Steamtown Carnforth where it was restored. Came to Kirkby Stephen East in 2000, spent three years at the Caledonian Railway (Brechin), now back at KSE. Currently in South Durham and Lancashire Union Railway livery. Last ran in 2016, currently awaiting re-certification, aim to have back into service during the 2019 season. |
| Peckett and Sons | No. 2111 'Lytham St. Annes' | 0-4-0ST | | Operational | This locomotive was built by Peckett & Sons in 1949 and was used at Blackpool Gassworks where it was noted as No 1 Lytham St Annes. When it finished its industrial service it was preserved privately by J Morris of Lytham St Annes and was exhibited in his Motive Power Museum at Lytham St Annes. In 1984 the locomotive was put up for sale and the Redditch Railway Society sought to buy it but before the necessary funds could be raised a Peak Rail member bought it. In 1990 the locomotive moved to the Midland Railway Centre at Buttery where it ran until 1996. It was then restored and returned to service again in April 2017. In June 2018 the locomotive moved to the Stainmore Railway on loan. |
| Hunslet Austerity | No. 3825 (Runs in preservation as 68009) | 0-6-0ST | | Awaiting Overhaul | Delivered to Betteshanger Colliery, Kent in 1954. Sold into preservation at the Great Central Railway in November 1981, sold to North Norfolk Railway 1993. Bought by two Stainmore Railway Company directors in 2004, but then spot-hired. Initial work has begun on an overhaul, but further progress is dependent on the building of the new shed. |
| NER 901 | No. 910 | 2-4-0 | | Static Display | Built in 1875 for use on passenger trains between Newcastle and York/Edinburgh. Originally preserved in the old York Railway Museum, it was later displayed at the National Railway Museum and its outpost Shildon Locomotion Museum. Currently on display in the Darlington trainshed at Kirkby Stephen East. On loan from the National Collection. |
| NER C1 / LNER J21 | NER No. 876 LNER No. 65033 | 0-6-0 | | Under overhaul | 65033 will arrive at Kirkby Stephen East once her overhaul is completed. Donated to the Locomotive Conservation and Learning Trust from the North Norfolk Railway, the locomotive has not steamed in preservation since the 1980s. 65033 was cosmetically restored by volunteers at Shildon Locomotion Museum to appear in British Railways unlined black for the 150th anniversary of the opening of the Stainmore route in 2011 (Stainmore 150). The locomotive will arrive back at Kirkby Stephen to take residence in the new locomotive shed after her overhaul is completed. |
| F. C. Hibberd & Co Planet DM | Planet DM "Elizabeth" | 0-4-0DM | | Operational | 0-4-0DM "Elizabeth". Hartley quarry locomotive, sold into further industrial use, eventually ending up under the ownership of Harry Needle Railroad company. Sold in 2004 to Stainmore. Now used on rear of passenger steam trains, and at the front on diesel worked services. |
| Yorkshire Engine Company Janus | Stanton 50 | 0-6-0DE | | Operational | 0-6-0DE "Stanton No50". Ex stanton steelworks locomotive, the only 'Janus' type locomotive at the works, despite a successful career. Sold into further industrial use. The loco was eventually donated to an abortive preservation scheme. The loco then passed from one railway to another for a number of years, eventually ending up at the Nene Valley Railway where she received a full overhaul to operational condition and fitting of both air and vacuum braking systems. The loco was sold privately and is now based at Stainmore Railway Company and is used on Diesel passenger services (the first out of Kirkby Stephen East since the line was closed to passengers in 1965). |
| Yorkshire Engine Company | No. 305 | 0-4-0DH | | Operational | Manufactured by YEC and donated for use at KSE by CorusRail at Workington in 2007. It is in full working order and work is ongoing to restore its bodywork and repaint it. |

== Rolling stock ==
| Class | Number (&Name) | Wheels | Image | Status | Notes |
|---|---|---|---|---|---|
| BR Mk1 BSK | 35200 | bogie coach | | Operational | One of two operating BR MK1 coaches at Stainmore Railway Company, used on its own during the 2012 operating season, now works paired with TSO. Restoration is ongoing, with a certain amount of welding work required around the Guard's doors. Currently being painted into BR lined Maroon. On long-term loan from the Scottish Industrial Railway Centre. |
| BR Mk1 BSK | SC5049 | bogie coach | | Operational | Brought in to replace TSO 4249, SC5049 is currently loaned to SRC for a period of 6 years by the Scottish Industrial Railway Centre. During this, the coach will have restoration work carried out, including the refitting of tables.. |
| NER Stores van | 5523 | bogie van | | Under restoration | Owned by the Locomotive Conservation and Learning Trust (LCLT) and arrived at KSE in 2014. The van built in York in 1902 to diagram H2 was stored a Beamish Museum in Co Durham. Unfortunately it was subjected to an arson attack in the 1980s but it is restorable. 5523 will be externally restored to its original specification and the interior will form the basis of an exhibition about the J21 locomotive 65033 which is owned by the LCLT. |
| NER full brake | (2)131 | 6 wheeled (currently on 4) | | Under restoration | 6 wheel compartment brake van which is currently undergoing restoration. Largely completed internally, with substantial external panelling work completed, moved into new restoration building where restoration has resumed |
| NER Luggage Composite | 1111 | 6 wheeled (currently on 4) | | Under restoration | Built as a six-wheeled luggage composite, No.1111 was withdrawn from passenger service in 1924 and used as a 'Tool Van' until withdrawal. Purchased by the NER Coach group and moved to the North Yorkshire Moors Railway where it was used as a workshop at Levisham until 2019. Moved to KSE as part of a 30-year lease with SRC for full restoration to working order, including reinstatement of the centre wheelset. |
| LMS Box van | | 4 wheeled | | Fully restored | Now fully restored and painted as the final stage of its restoration. It does not carry a number as it was a box van body that was put onto new bogies. |
| BR 5 plank pipe wagon | 741521 | 4 wheeled | | Under restoration | Ex-LNER 5-plank 'pipe' wagon. Restoration work commenced in 2016 on this item, with the worn panelling removed, buffers since removed and under-frame awaiting shot-blasting in the future. |
| CLC Brake van | 9950 | 6 wheeled | | Operating | Originally thought to be a NER 6 wheeled brake van, now believed to be ex-Cheshire Lines Committee. This van was originally going to form the basis of passenger services (with fitting of vacuum brakes). This was suspended with the arrival of a BR MK1 BSK. The vehicle still sees occasional use on track maintenance trains and footplate experience courses, as well as acting as a barrier vehicle when unloading rolling stock. Requires re-panelling. |
| LNER TTO | 60505 | Gresley bogie | | Under Restoration | LNER TTO No 60505. Part of a batch of shortened vehicles designed for the Great Eastern section of the LNER. Largely complete, but cannot be completed until space is available in the restoration building, where the gangway connections, roof vents, and buffers will be fitted (something which cannot be done in its current cramped accommodation in the former Tebay platform). When completed, will be the only operational 'Short' Gresley coach in the UK. |
| LNER BFK | 4163 | Gresley bogie | | Awaiting restoration | LNER Gresley Brake First Corridor No4163. Owned by the North Tyneside Steam Railway Association. |
| LNER BTK | 3669 | Gresley bogie | BTK 3669 in the restoration shed at KSE | Awaiting restoration | LNER Gresley Brake Third Corridor No.3669. Owned by the LNER Carriage Association, Fully restored in 2015, moved to KSE in 2019 as part of a 2-year agreement to provide undercover accommodation for the vehicle, something currently lacking at the NYMR. Will be used on advertised steam days at Stainmore Railway Company. |
| LNER covered goods van | 680360, restored as 241245 | 4 wheeled | | Restored | Was under restoration at the Mid-Suffolk Light Railway. Moved to Kirkby Stephen East in 2015, restored in a blue LNER engineers' livery as No. 241245 |
