= Clifton and Lowther railway station =

Former railway station in Westmorland, England

Coordinates: 54.618276°N 2.713119°W

Clifton & Lowther
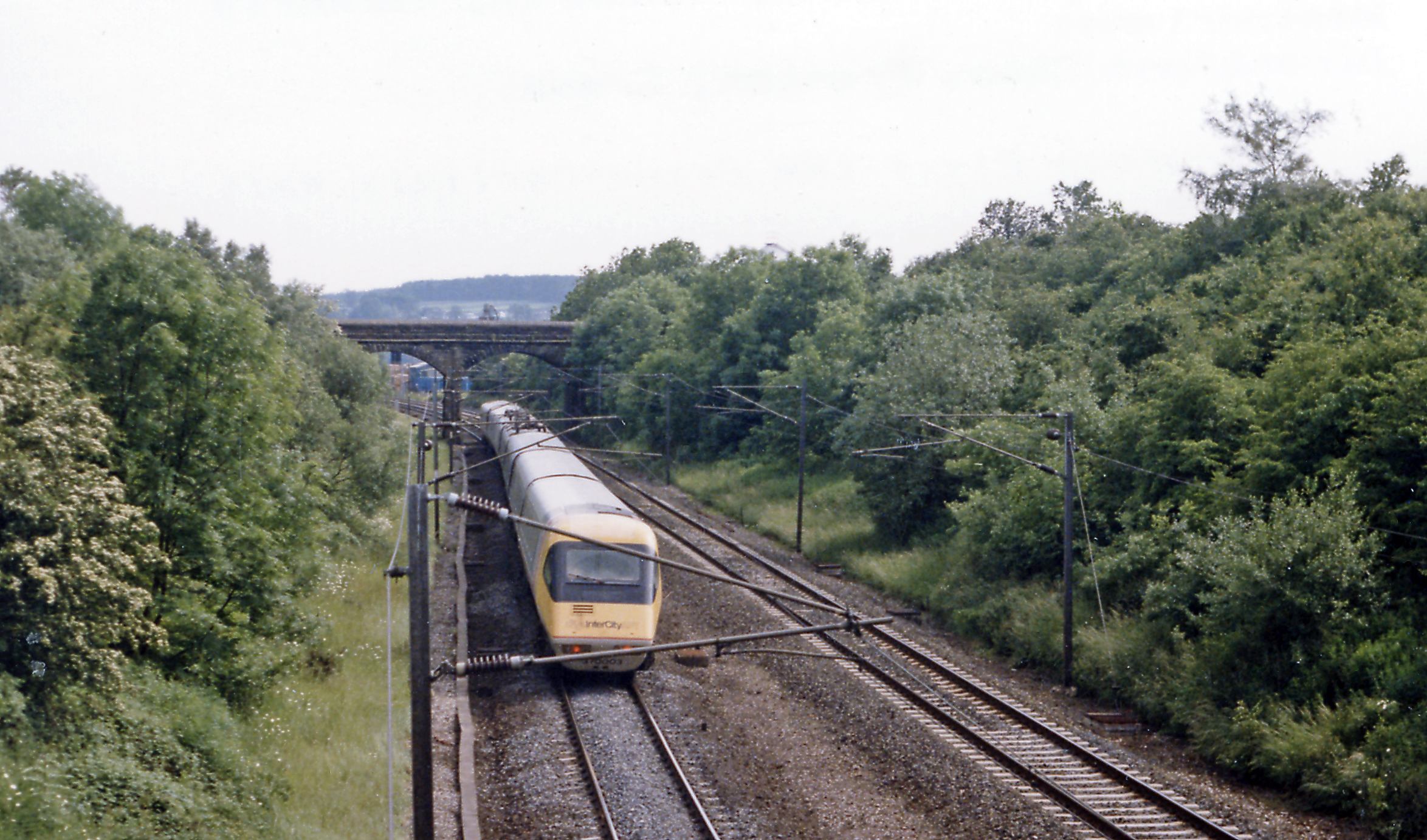
- Advanced Passenger Train southbound approaching the site of the station in 1986

General information
- Location: Clifton, Westmorland and Furness; England
- Platforms: 2

Other information
- Status: Disused

History
- Original company: Lancaster and Carlisle Railway
- Pre-grouping: London and North Western Railway
- Post-grouping: London Midland and Scottish Railway

Key dates
- 17 December 1846: Opened as Clifton
- 1 February 1887: Renamed Clifton & Lowther
- 4 July 1938: Closed to passengers
- 1 June 1951: Closed to freight
Location

Clifton & Lowther railway station was a station on the Lancaster and Carlisle Railway (L&CR) south of Penrith, near the village of Clifton. Although it was the original terminus to cross Pennines rail traffic on the Eden Valley Railway, it was rapidly bypassed by a new line and junction. The station, which was on the West Coast Main Line, was treated as a private stop by the Earls of Lonsdale.

== History ==
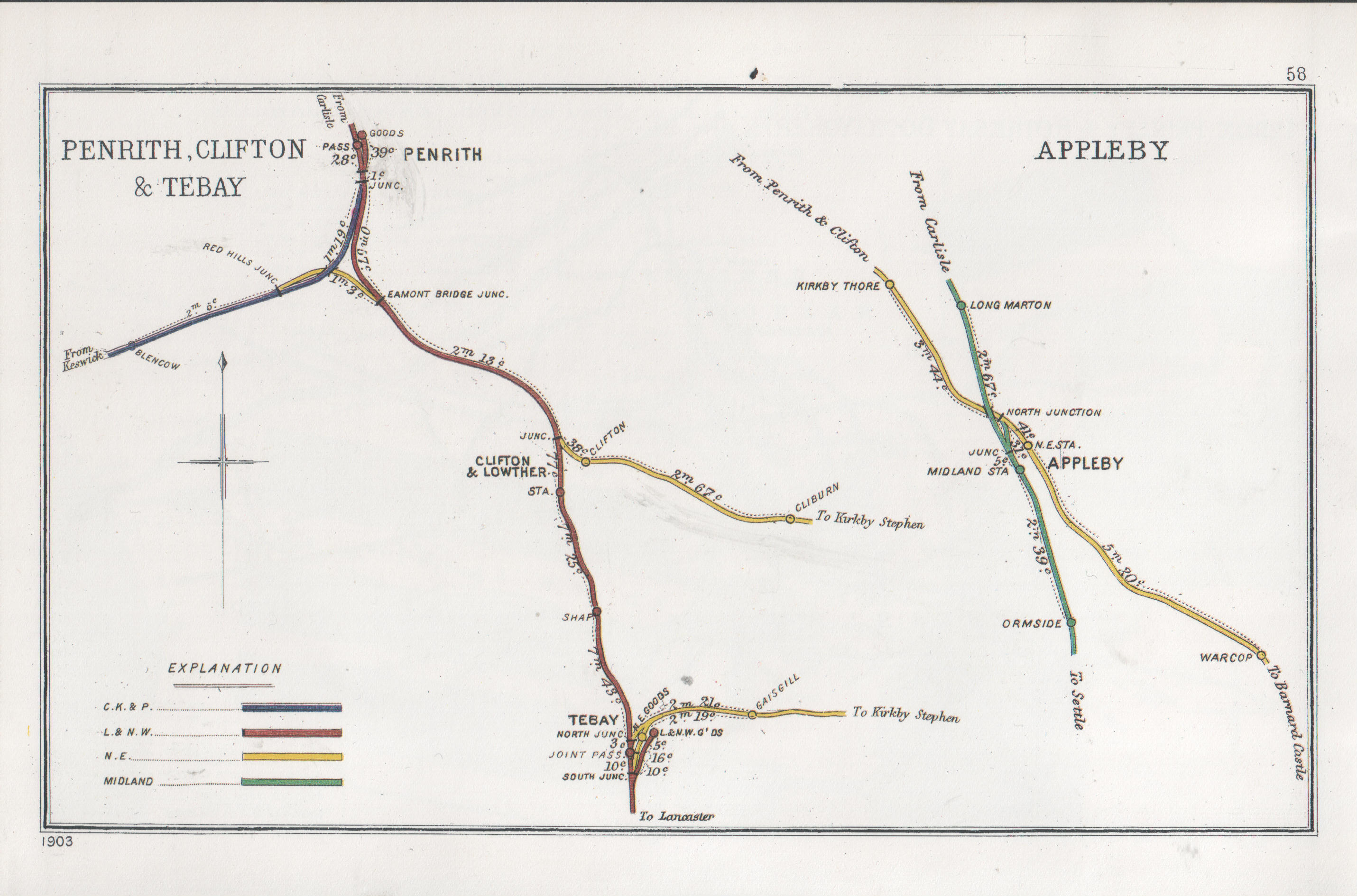
A pre-grouping railway junction map showing Clifton and Lowther station on the line between the line from Penrith and Tebay and the junction with the Eden Valley Railway

The station opened as a Clifton railway station on the Lancaster and Carlisle Railway in 1846. In 1858, work began to build the Eden Valley Railway between Penrith and Kirkby Stephen via Appleby-in-Westmorland. It would primarily be for mineral traffic, but it would also carry passengers. The terminus at the western end of the new line would be Clifton Station. Eden Valley passenger services used an island platform that also served the West Coast Main Line. The station also had goods sidings, a turntable, and a water tower.

However, even before the Eden Valley line opened, plans were conceived to build a northern junction that would provide a direct link between the industrial areas of West Cumberland and the northeast's coalfields around Durham and Newcastle. The Eden Valley line would provide a direct connection between the Cockermouth & Workington Railway's Workington to Penrith line and the Stockton and Darlington railways.

Although the branch, which had several cuttings, embankments, and bridges, was completed to Clifton station by 1862, permission was given to build the northern connection that would allow trains from Penrith to run directly onto the Eden Valley line. When the new route opened in 1863, a new Clifton station was built on the northern section (it was later renamed Clifton Moor in 1927). Eden Valley trains could now use the northern track as they had been granted running powers on the L&CR line to Penrith.

After 1874, the short southern branch from the Eden Valley Railway to the original Clifton station was closed.

Despite losing its cross-Pennine passenger services, the station remained open. In 1887, the station was renamed Clifton & Lowther. It closed to passenger services in 1938 and to freight in 1951.

== Private station ==
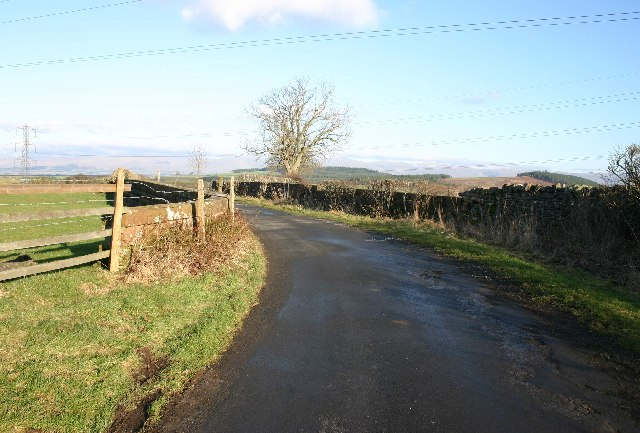
Remains of a bridge over the original Eden Valley Railway line to Clifton & Lowther

When Clifton first opened, Henry Lowther, the 3rd Earl of Lonsdale, who lived in the nearby Lowther Castle, was permitted to stop any train on demand. When the new Clifton Station (see Clifton Moor) opened in 1863, the railway company built him a private waiting room. This private agreement was subsequently passed on to future Earls of Lonsdale.

A 1903 article in Railway Magazine noted:

We cannot regard Lowther Railway Station, on the London and North-Western line, as absolutely a private station, but the Earl of Lonsdale, who is the great territorial feudal lord of the district of Cumberland that stretches about Penrith and Askham, has a private agreement with the railway authorities in virtue of which, for certain concessions made with regard to building the station, the land it stands on, etc., he, his family, and guests have the right to have any train stopped at any required times at Lowther Station, whether such trains are expresses or not, and whether they may be timed to stop near or far from Lowther Station.

It will easily be seen, therefore, that, such a "right" is tantamount in many ways to owning a private railway station, with the additional advantage that somebody else keeps up the maintenance of the place! Yet "Clifton and Lowther Station" is open to the public, and so is not absolutely a "private" station.

The Earl and his family often exercise their right, and the German Emperor, when visiting his friend Lord Lonsdale, has more than once also availed himself of the privilege of detraining at Lowther. It is a station right nobly appointed, and right royally situated, for it lies in the very midst of some of the finest scenery in England. Lord Lonsdale, moreover, is a landlord and nobleman of the old type, who does everything pertaining to his station and duties as a "grand seigneur" in a way above all criticism and cavil. You may be sure that Lowther Station, therefore, is all such a railway station should be.

Preceding station	Historical railways	Following station
Shap	London and North Western Railway; Lancaster and Carlisle Railway	Penrith
	Disused railways	
Terminus	Eden Valley Railway closed 1874	Cliburn

== Bibliography ==
- Mannex, P.J. (1849) History, topography, and directory, of Westmorland: and Lonsdale north of the sands, in Lancashire together with a descriptive and geological view of the whole of the Lake district, "Railways" pp. 51–54, discovery of Roman altar during construction of Clifton station p.54 via books.google.co.uk
