= Tees railway viaduct =

Coordinates: 54.5528°N 1.9415°W

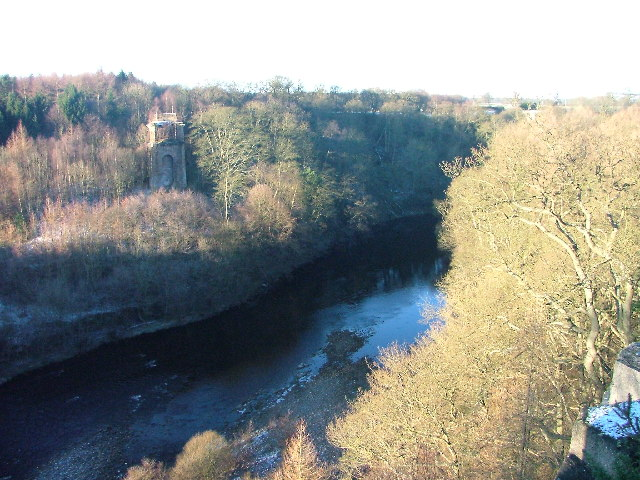
Western abutment of the dismantled railway bridge across the River Tees

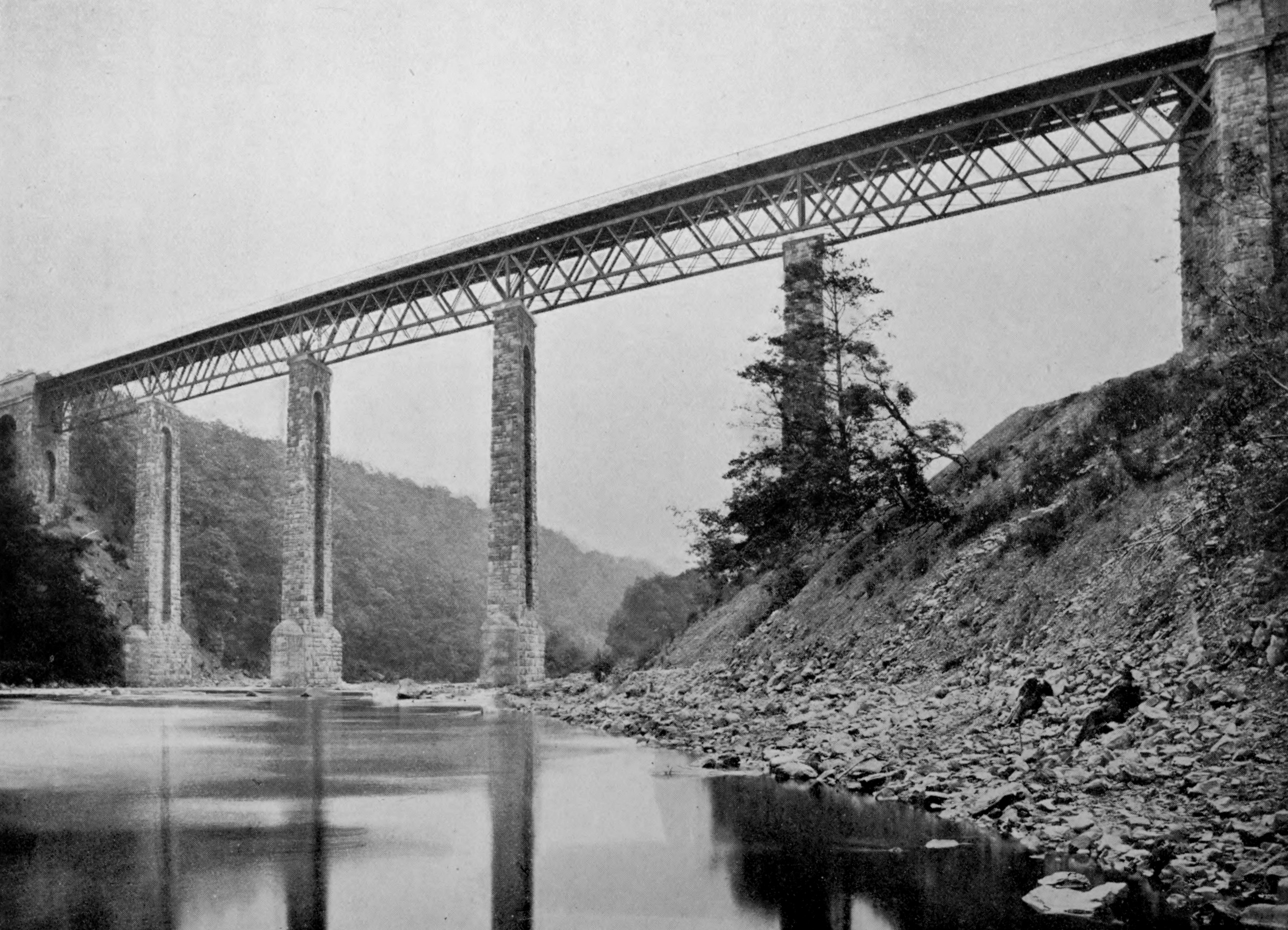
The Tees viaduct in circa 1860 from a contemporary photograph

The Tees railway viaduct was a railway bridge in the county of Durham, England, which carried the South Durham and Lancashire Union Railway over the River Tees west of Barnard Castle.

== History ==
The bridge was 732 feet (223 m) long and 132 feet (40 m) high. It was built in 1860 and demolished in 1971. It was designed by the railway's engineer Thomas Bouch, who also designed the ill-fated Tay Bridge, which famously collapsed in 1879, ending his career.

The abutments of the old bridge remained after demolition, and there is now a council-approved proposal to build an 870-foot-long (270 m) pedestrian suspension rope bridge in its place. The proposed design is similar to the bridge over the River Ébron in France. If completed, it would be the longest bridge of its type in the United Kingdom. This scheme is now unlikely to happen because of a lack of support from the public and landowners who would be affected.
