= Clifton Moor railway station =

Disused railway station in Cumbria, England

Coordinates: 54.62884°N 2.71094°W

Clifton Moor
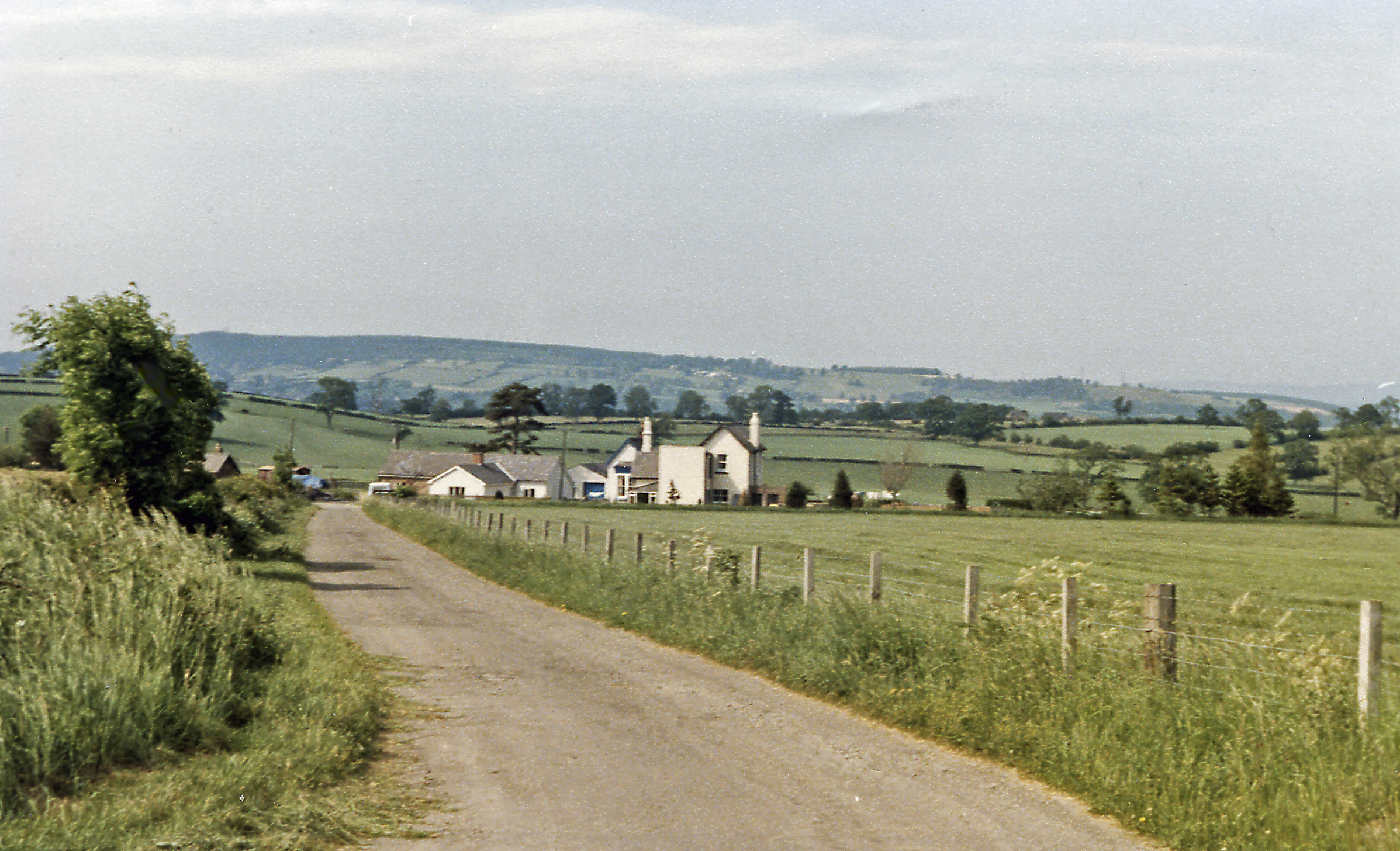
- Site of the station in 1986

General information
- Location: Clifton, Westmorland and Furness; England
- Platforms: 2

Other information
- Status: Disused

History
- Original company: Eden Valley Railway
- Pre-grouping: North Eastern Railway (UK)
- Post-grouping: London and North Eastern Railway

Key dates
- 1 August 1863: Opened as Clifton
- 1 September 1927: renamed Clifton Moor
- 22 January 1962: Closed
Location

Clifton Moor railway station was situated in England on the Eden Valley Railway between Penrith and Kirkby Stephen East. It served the village of Clifton. The station opened to passenger traffic on 1 August 1863, and was originally named 'Clifton'. The 'Moor' suffix was added on 1 September 1927. The station finally closed on 22 January 1962.

On one of the station's platforms a private waiting room was built for the "Yellow Earl of Lonsdale" who lived at nearby Lowther Castle.

To the west of the station was Eden Valley Junction where the Eden Valley Railway joined the Lancaster and Carlisle Railway (now part of the West Coast Main Line), south of the junction was at one time Clifton and Lowther railway station.

Preceding station	Disused railways	Following station
Penrith	North Eastern Railway; Eden Valley Railway	Cliburn
