= Cliburn railway station =

Disused railway station in Westmorland, England

Cliburn
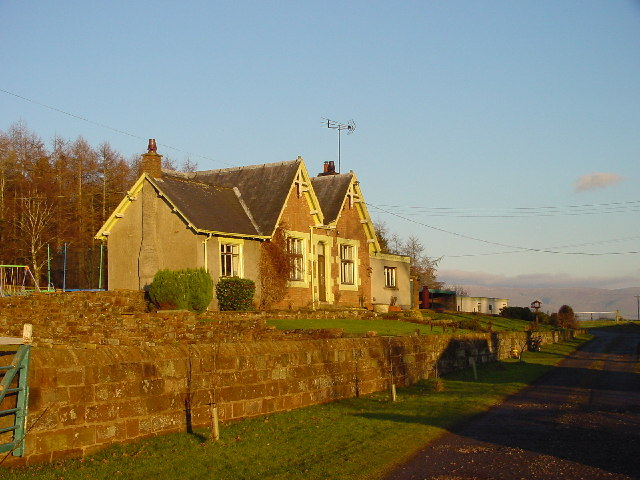
- Cliburn station in 2006

General information
- Location: Cliburn, Westmorland and Furness; England
- Coordinates: 54.6277°N 2.6425°W
- Grid reference: NY586260
- Platforms: 1

Other information
- Status: Disused

History
- Original company: Eden Valley Railway
- Pre-grouping: North Eastern Railway
- Post-grouping: London and North Eastern Railway

Key dates
- 9 June 1862: Station opened
- 17 September 1956: Station closed
Location
- Location within the former Eden District Location within Cumbria

Cliburn railway station was a stop on the Eden Valley Railway in Westmorland (now in Cumbria), England; it is located to the north of the village of Cliburn.

== History ==
The station opened to passenger traffic on 9 June 1862 and closed on 17 September 1956.

The station building and single platform were on the south side of the track; a signal box on the north side controlled the level crossing gates on the road to Cliburn. There was also a goods siding behind the station, which was used to host a camping coach from 1937 to 1939 and was possibly visited by a coach in 1933 and 1934.

Preceding station	Disused railways	Following station
Clifton Moor after 1863	North Eastern Railway; Eden Valley Railway	Temple Sowerby
Clifton before 1863	North Eastern Railway; Eden Valley Railway	Temple Sowerby

== The site today ==
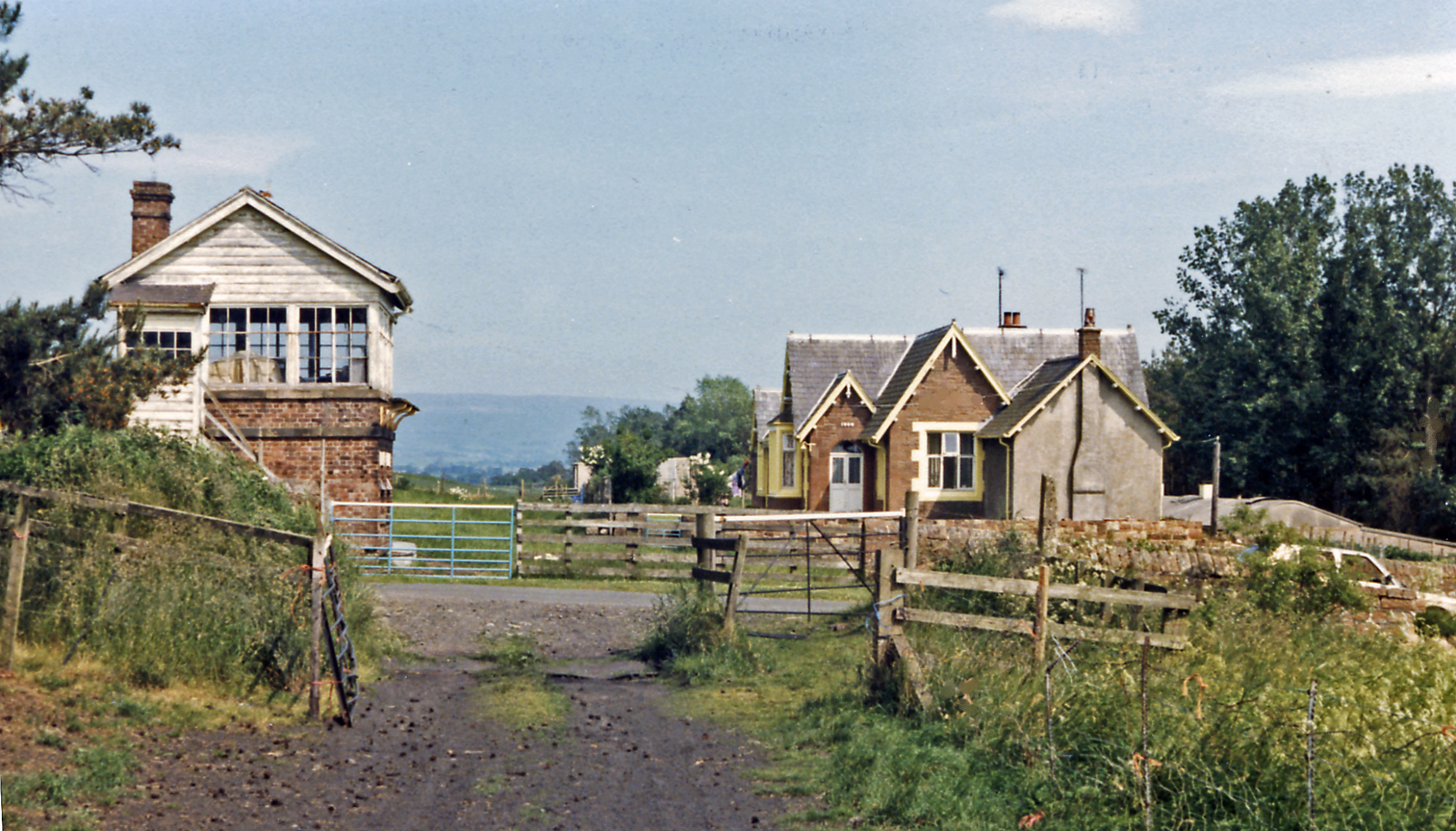
View eastward towards Kirkby Stephen in 1986

After closure, the station house became a private residence. The signal box also survives and has been restored as a holiday cottage.
