= Penrith railway station =

Railway station in Cumbria, England

Penrith Penrith North Lakes
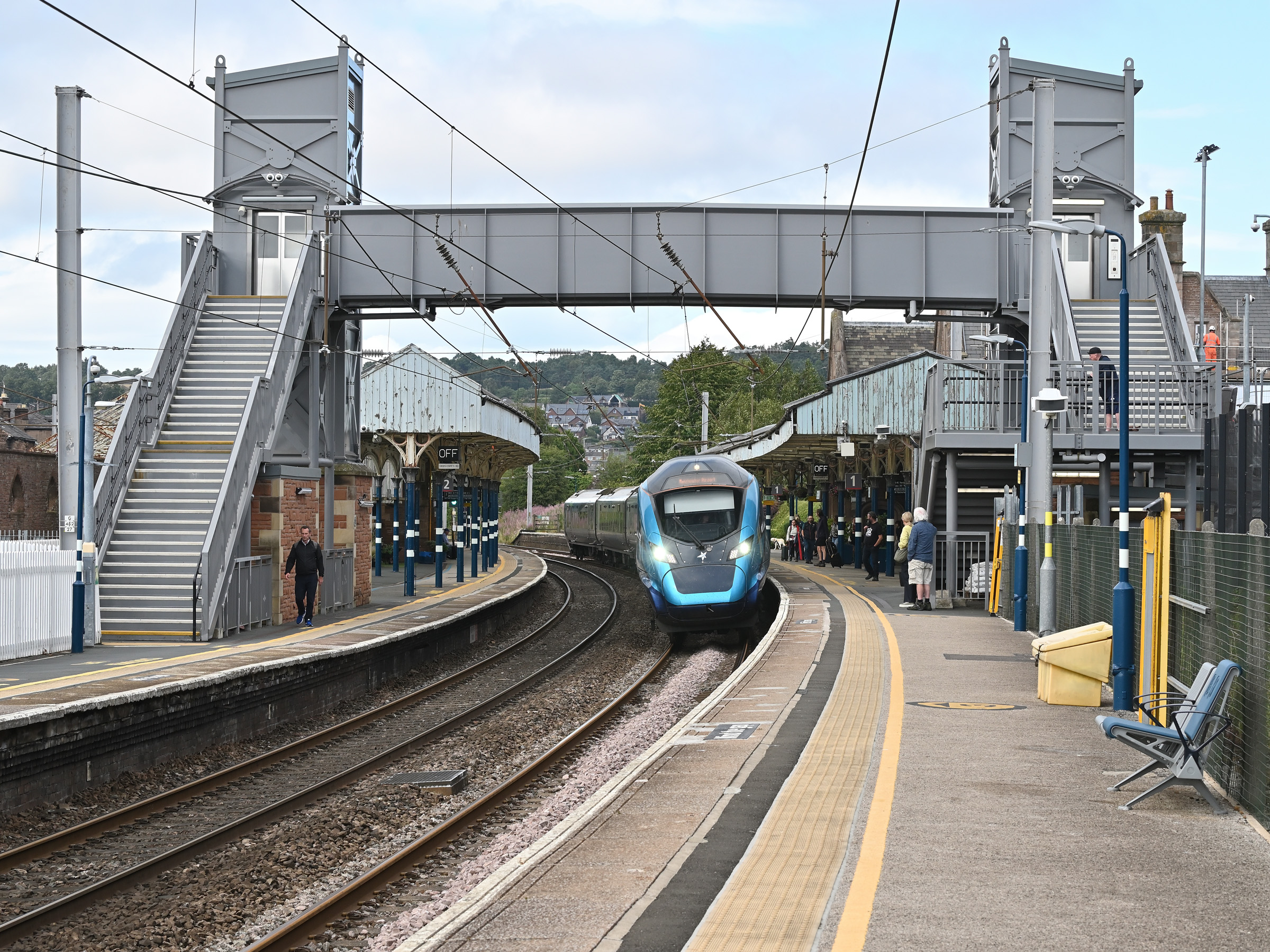

General information
- Location: Penrith, Westmorland and Furness; England
- Coordinates: 54°39′43″N 2°45′31″W
- Grid reference: NY511299
- Owner: Network Rail
- Manager: Avanti West Coast
- Platforms: 3
- Tracks: 3

Other information
- Station code: PNR
- Classification: DfT category D

History
- Original company: Lancaster and Carlisle Railway
- Pre-grouping: London and North Western Railway
- Post-grouping: London, Midland and Scottish Railway, British Rail (London Midland Region)

Key dates
- 17 December 1846: Opened as Penrith
- 1904: Renamed Penrith for Ullswater Lake
- 6 May 1974: Renamed Penrith
- 18 May 2003: Renamed Penrith North Lakes

Passengers
- 2021/22: ▲0.506 million
- Interchange: ▲0.114 million
- 2022/23: ▼0.491 million
- Interchange: 0.114 million
- 2023/24: ▲0.610 million
- Interchange: ▲0.162 million
- 2024/25: ▲0.716 million
- Interchange: ▲0.209 million
- 2025/26: ▲0.792 million
- Interchange: ▲0.224 million

Listed Building – Grade II
- Feature: Original Lancaster and Carlisle Railway station buildings
- Designated: 9 February 1983
- Reference no.: 1326905
Location
- Location within the former Eden District Location within Cumbria
Notes
- Passenger statistics from the Office of Rail and Road

Penrith North Lakes (also shortened to Penrith) is a railway station on the West Coast Main Line, which runs between London Euston and Glasgow Central. Situated 17 miles 69 chains (28.7 km) south of Carlisle, it serves the market town of Penrith, in Westmorland and Furness, Cumbria, England. The station is owned by Network Rail and managed by Avanti West Coast.

== History ==
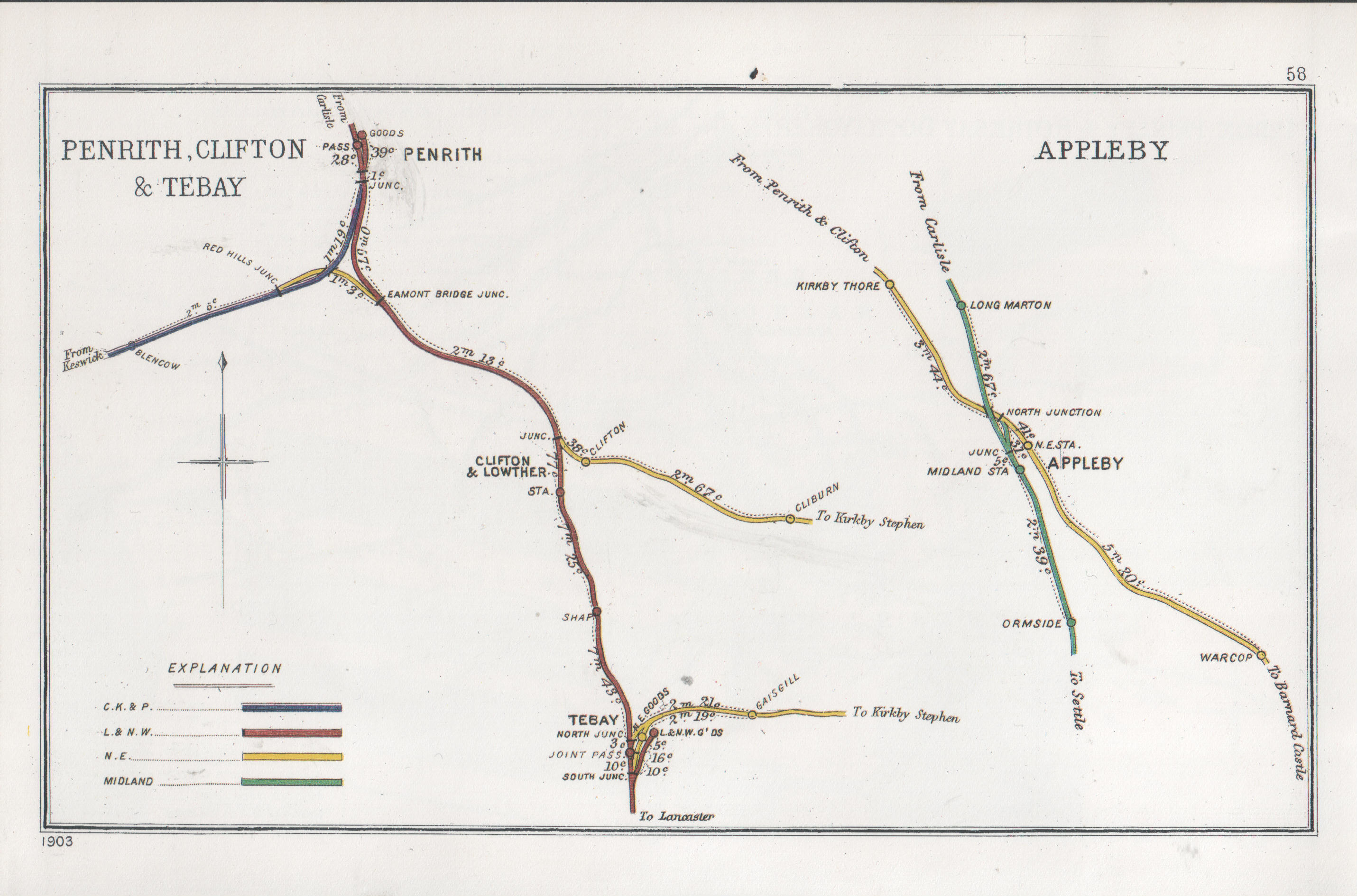
A 1903 Railway Clearing House map, showing railway lines in the vicinity of Penrith

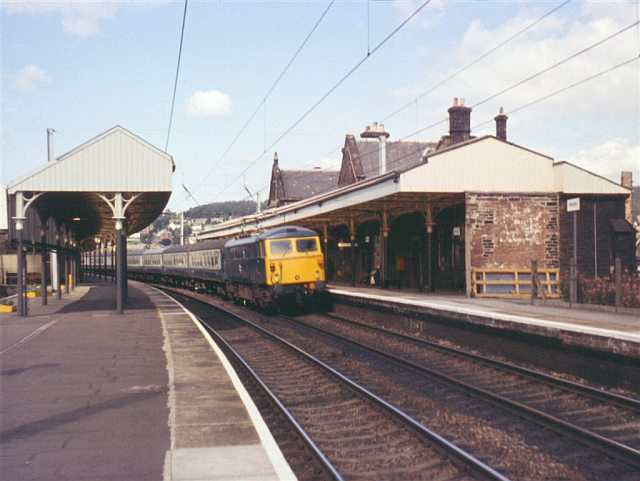
A Class 87 passing through the station, heading south towards London Euston in August 1974

The station was built by the Lancaster and Carlisle Railway and was opened on 17 December 1846. The station was designed by Sir William Tite, designer of a number of early railway stations in Britain, including neighbouring Carlisle (Citadel), as well as Carnforth and Lancaster (Castle). It is recorded in the National Heritage List for England as a designated Grade II listed building.

An 1863 Ordnance Survey plan shows refreshment facilities in the large room seen to the right on entering the building, but this is now used for storage.

Although the station is now relatively quiet, it previously served as the terminus of the Cockermouth, Keswick and Penrith Railway and the North Eastern Railway's Eden Valley branch. The latter joined with the South Durham and Lancashire Union Railway at Kirkby Stephen, providing connections to the East Coast Main Line at Darlington. In the mid-19th century, there was a plan to connect Penrith to the lead mines at Caldbeck by rail, eventually joining up with the Cumbrian Coast Line near Wigton.

Passenger services to Darlington and Kirkby Stephen were withdrawn on 22 January 1962, whilst those to Workington via Cockermouth fell victim to the Beeching Axe around four years later. The surviving section of the Cockermouth, Keswick and Penrith Railway as far as Keswick survived until 6 March 1972. There have recently been plans to reopen the line as far as Keswick, but there have been no further developments to progress this at present.

The station was the last in the United Kingdom where mail was collected by a moving train, the practice finally coming to an end on 3 October 1971.

Opened as Penrith, the station was renamed Penrith for Ullswater Lake in 1904. The station's name reverted to the original Penrith on 6 May 1974. It has since been renamed Penrith North Lakes on 18 May 2003.

The station won the Medium Station of the Year award at the National Rail Awards in 2020.

== Facilities ==
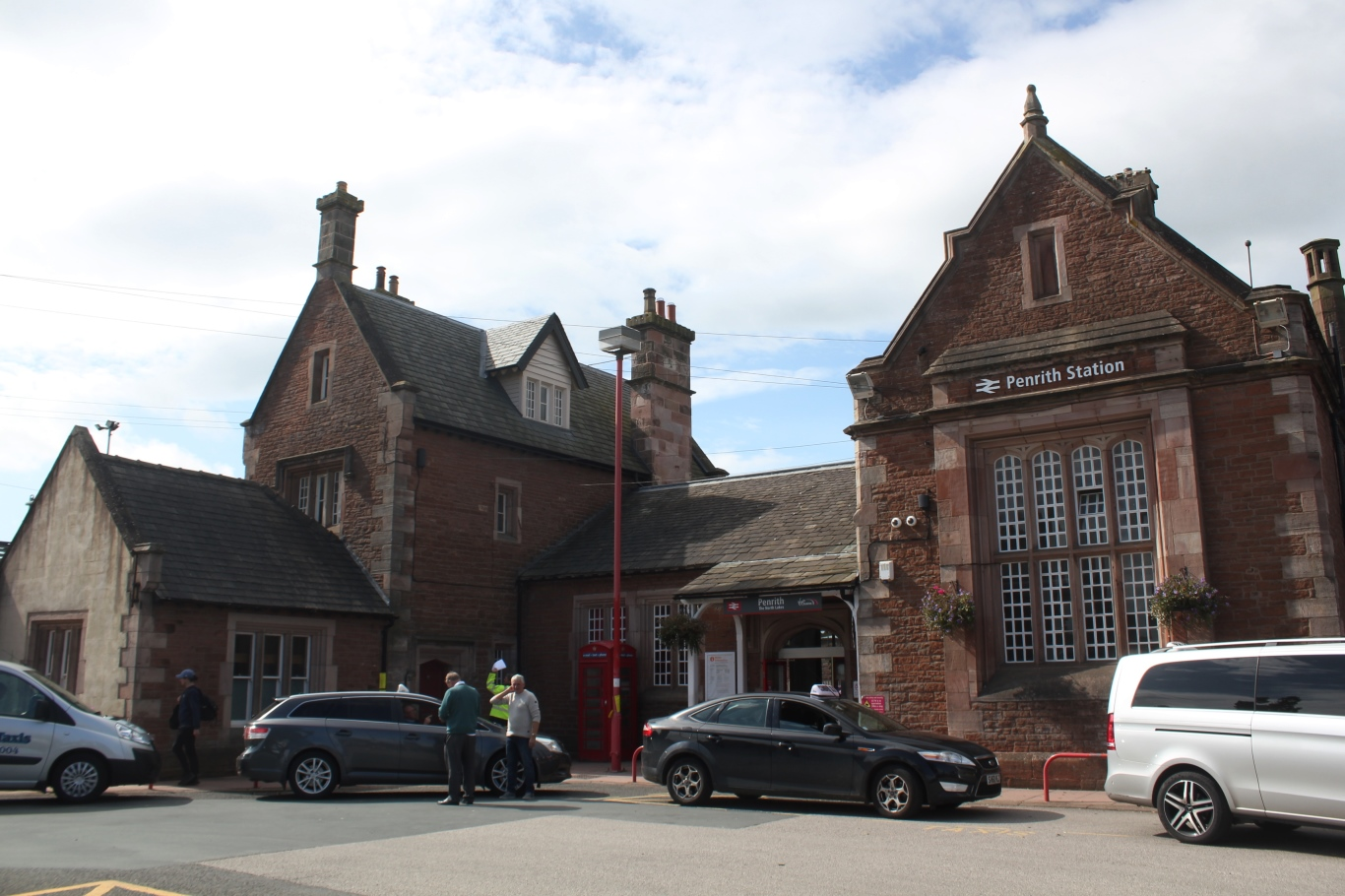
The station entrance

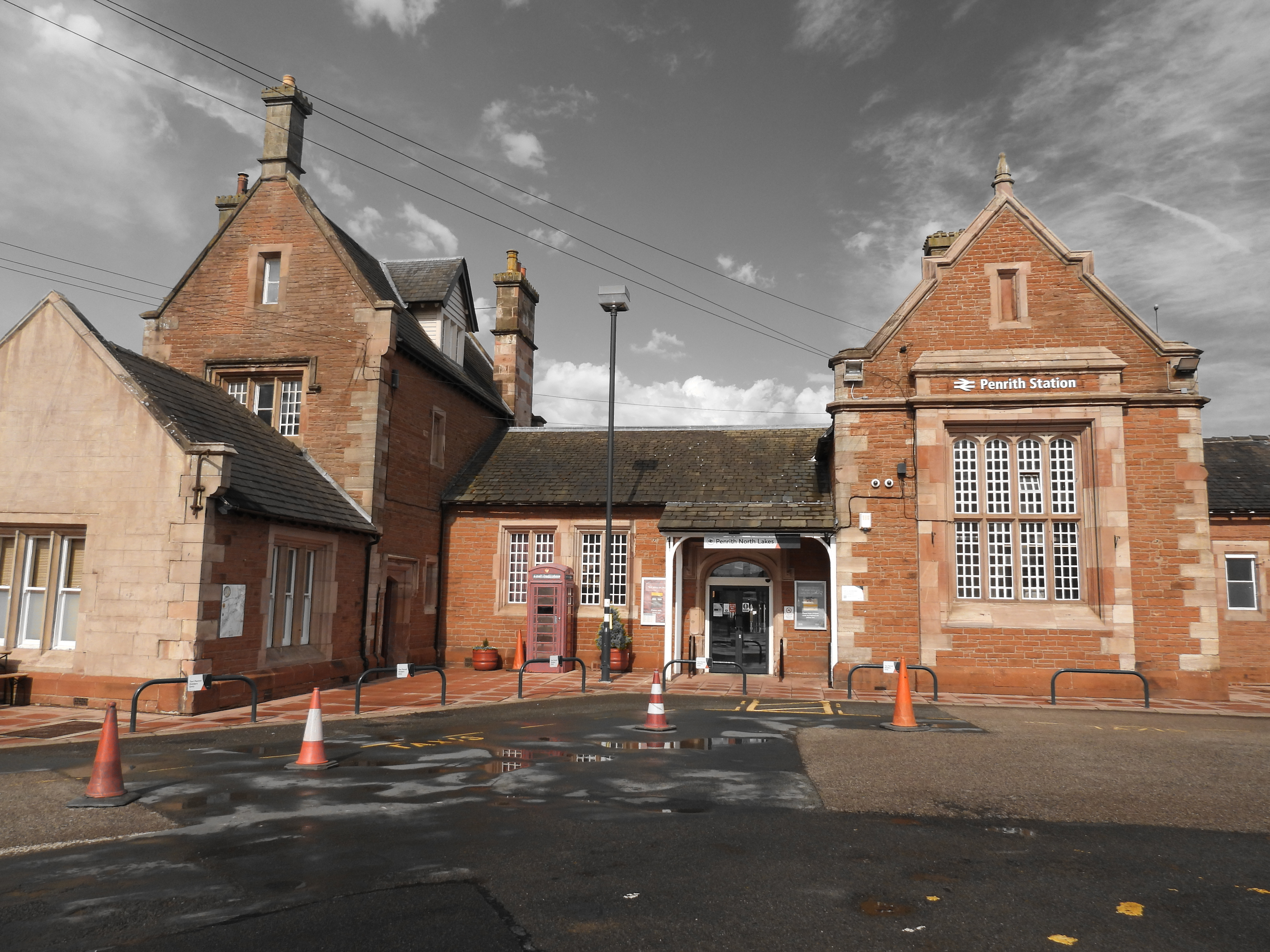
The entrance of the Penrith Railway Station (2026).

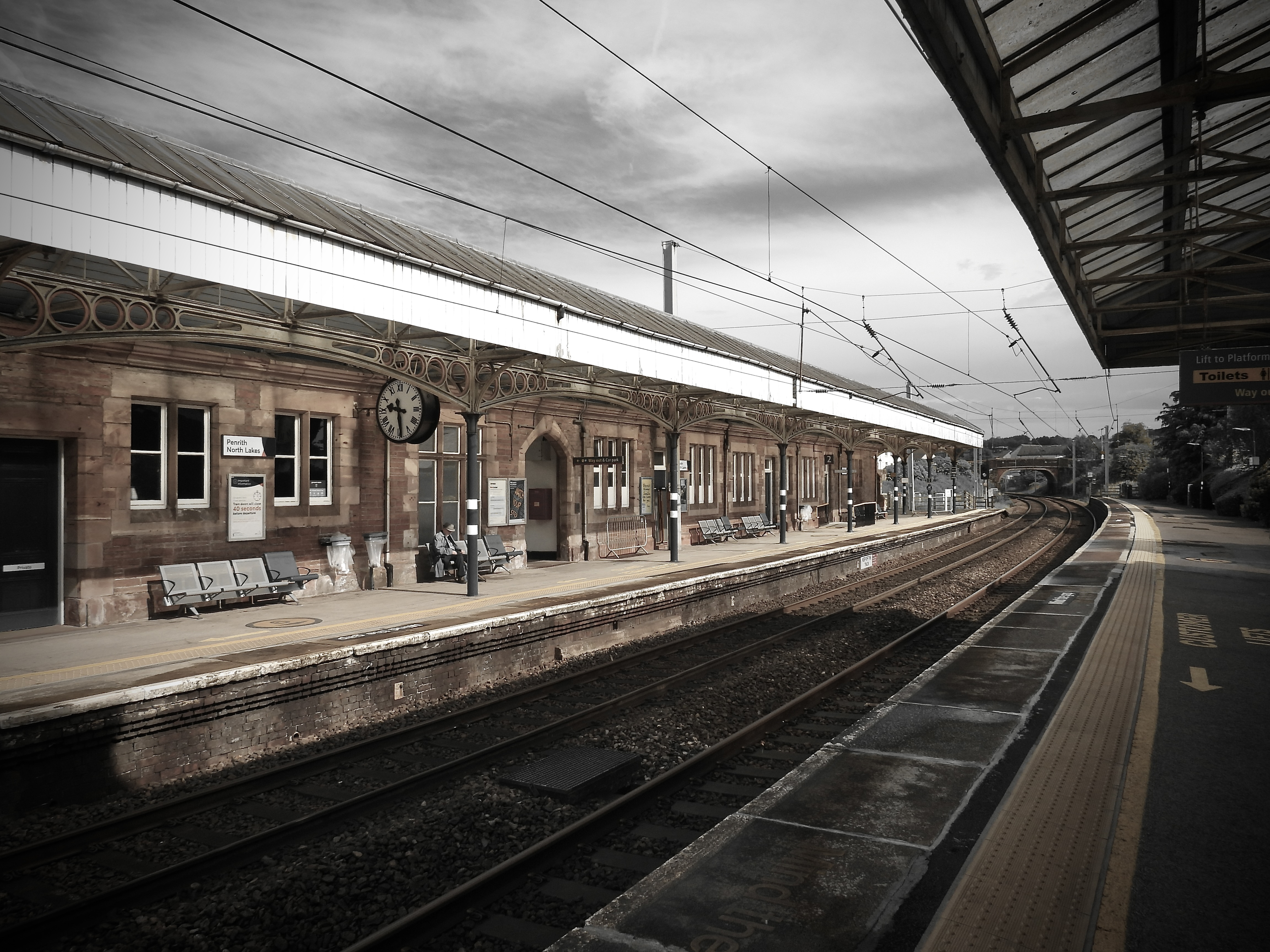
Looking down the railway lines at Penrith Railway Station. (2026)

The station is staffed throughout the day, with the ticket office open from 05:30–19:00 on Mondays to Saturdays and 11:30–19:00 on Sundays. A self-service ticket machine is also available. Train running information is provided by an automated public address system and customer information screens, with a help point on platform 2 (platform 3 is rarely used). Waiting rooms are provided on platforms 1 and 2, along with toilets (only on platform 1), a post box on platform 1. Step-free access is available to all platforms via lifts and across the footbridge and a subway is also available.

== Services ==
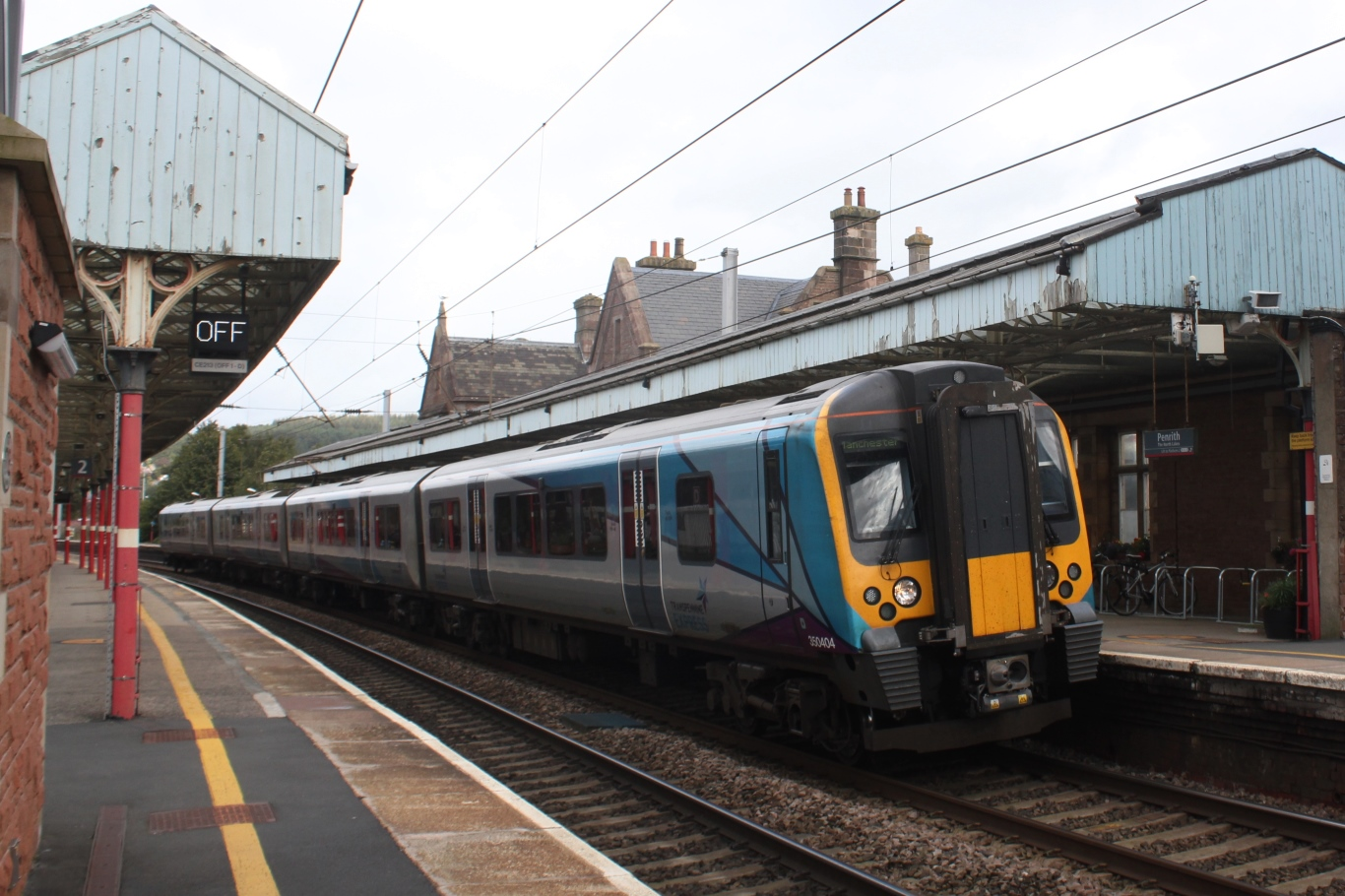
A TransPennine Express Class 350 Desiro, seen operating a service to Manchester Airport in September 2019

The station is served by two train operating companies:

=== Avanti West Coast ===
Avanti West Coast operates services on the West Coast Main Line southbound to London Euston, via Preston, with 5 trains per day (tpd) going via Birmingham New Street and the rest via the Trent Valley Line. A single evening service operates to Crewe on weekdays.

Heading north, there are services towards Glasgow Central, via Carlisle, as well as two trains per day (three on Saturdays and four on Sundays) towards Edinburgh Waverley via Carlisle.

These services operate using Class 390 Pendolinos.

=== TransPennine Express ===
TransPennine Express operates nine trains per day heading north towards Glasgow Central via Carlisle (seven on Sundays), as well as three trains per day to Edinburgh Waverley via Carlisle.

Heading south, there are 15 trains per day to Manchester Airport (11 trains per day on Sunday), with one service to Liverpool Lime Street.

Rolling stock used: Class 397 Civity.

Preceding station	National Rail	Following station
Lancaster	Avanti West Coast; West Coast Main Line	Carlisle
Oxenholme Lake District	Avanti West Coast; West Coast Main Line	Carlisle
Preston	Avanti West Coast; West Coast Main Line	Carlisle
Lancaster	TransPennine Express; West Coast Main Line	Carlisle
Oxenholme Lake District	TransPennine Express; West Coast Main Line	Carlisle
Preston	TransPennine Express; West Coast Main Line	Carlisle
	Disused railways	
Blencow	Cockermouth, Keswick and Penrith Railway	Terminus
Terminus	Eden Valley Railway	Clifton Moor
	Historical railways	
Clifton and Lowther	London and North Western Railway; Lancaster and Carlisle Railway	Plumpton

== See also ==
- Listed buildings in Penrith, Cumbria
