= Eden Valley Railway =

Former railway

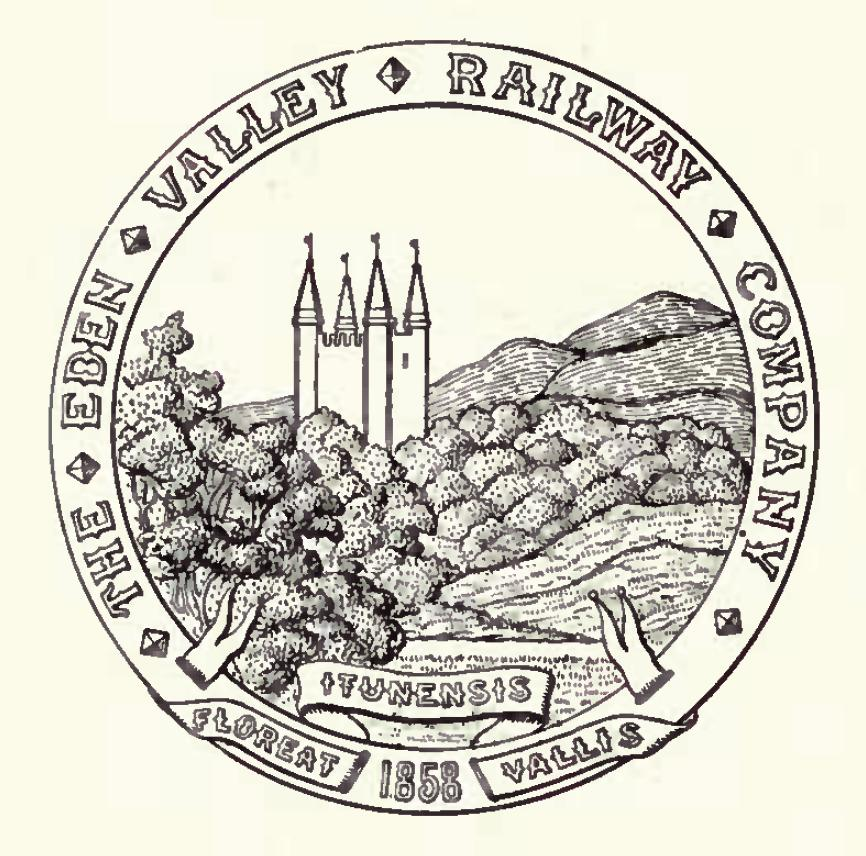
- Eden Valley Railway seal

Overview
- Dates of operation: 21 May 1858–1962
- Successor: Stockton and Darlington Railway (1862); North Eastern Railway (1863); London and North Eastern Railway (1923); British Railways (1948)

The Eden Valley Railway (EVR) was a railway in Cumbria, England. It ran between Clifton Junction near Penrith and Kirkby Stephen via Appleby-in-Westmorland.

Passenger traffic ended in 1962 and the line was reduced to the track between the junction at Appleby station with the Settle-Carlisle Line and Kirkby Stephen which served a quarry. By 1976, all that was left was 6 miles (10 km) of track between Appleby in Westmorland and Flitholme. It was used by infrequent British Army services to Warcop Training Area until 1989.

In 1995, the Eden Valley Railway Society was formed with the aim of reinstating services and restoring the line. Heritage railway services resumed operations in 2006 between Warcop and Sandford, with an extension of 1/2 mile (0.8 km) being opened in 2013, giving a current running line of almost 2 1/4 miles (3.6 km).

== History ==
=== Background ===
Before the construction of the Eden Valley Railway, in the 1840s, several schemes had been proposed which would have run to the Eden Valley; one was the York and Carlisle Junction Railway, backed by the Great North of England Railway, which would have run from Northallerton to Barnard Castle then across the Pennines to Kirkby Stephen, after which two branches would have been formed to connect with the Lancaster and Carlisle Railway; one to Tebay and the other to Clifton. Another similar scheme was the Northumberland and Lancashire Union which would have run from Gateshead near Newcastle upon Tyne to Barnard Castle, and then as the York and Carlisle Junction Railway across the Pennines via Kirkby Stephen to Tebay. Additionally the Yorkshire and Glasgow Union Railway was planned to run west from Thirsk through Wensleydale to Hawes, then north through the Mallerstang Valley to Kirkby Stephen, and then through the Eden Valley to Clifton via Appleby-in-Westmorland. Both the Yorkshire and Glasgow Union Railway and part of the York and Carlisle Junction Railway to Tebay were empowered by acts of Parliament in 1845 but the end of the Railway bubble of the 1840s meant that they were not built.

It was not until the late 1850s that a line through the Eden Valley was proposed again. Firstly a new trans-Pennine railway line was proposed, reviving the earlier schemes; the South Durham and Lancashire Union Railway (SD&LUR) was to run from the Stockton and Darlington Railway (Note: There were two connections, one from Barnard Castle (connected by the Darlington and Barnard Castle Railway), the other at Spring Garden Junction near St Helens on the Haggerleases Branch line.) to Kirkby Stephen and then to Tebay. A second line, the Eden Valley Railway would branch from the first at Kirkby Stephen and then go to Clifton via the upper Eden Valley. The main purpose of these lines was freight, not passengers; bringing higher grade iron ore from Cumberland and Lancashire to the blast furnaces of the North East, and coal and coke from the mines of Durham to the northwest of England. The route was shorter than the alternative, the Lancaster and Carlisle Railway.

Eden Valley Railway Act 1858
- Act of Parliament
- Parliament of the United Kingdom
- Long title: An Act to authorize the making of a Railway from the Lancaster and Carlisle Railway at or near Clifton to the South Durham and Lancashire Union Railway at or near Kirkby Stephen, all in the County of Westmoreland; and for other Purposes.
- Citation: 21 & 22 Vict. c. xiv

Dates
- Royal assent: 21 May 1858

The act of Parliament authorising South Durham and Lancashire Union Railway, the South Durham and Lancashire Union Railway Act 1857 (20 & 21 Vict. c. xl) was passed on 13 July 1857, and that for the Eden Valley Railway, the Eden Valley Railway Act 1858 (21 & 22 Vict. c. xiv) came soon after on 21 May 1858.

The act allowed the raising of a capital of £180,000. The appointed directors of the company include important figures from Westmorland and Cumberland including William Brougham, Sir Richard Tufton Isaac Wilson as well as Henry Pease.

=== Construction and route ===
Construction of the 22-mile (35 km) line was contracted to Messrs. Lawton Brothers of Newcastle, the turning of the sod ceremony took place on 4 August 1858 with Lord Brougham. Most of the stone for the railway's stations was quarried near Cliburn. Construction of the line was straightforward with only three minor rivers to cross and no tunnels in low-lying land; the maximum incline was 1 in 80, the average 1 in 150. The cost of construction had been £204,803 0s 8d (equivalent to £21,530,376 in 2025).

From Kirkby Stephen East station on the SD&LUR the line to Cumbria curves northwest to the junction at which the Eden Valley railway separates from the Tebay line and begins to travel roughly north. Two miles (3 km) after the junction a bridge over Scandal Beck is reached which was crossed by an iron bridge, less than 1 1/4 miles (2 km) further north the River Eden was crossed by Musgrave viaduct (Note: Musgrave Viaduct looking west 23.9.1978 Possibly later dating bridge over the Eden, since removed 54.51273°N 2.364453°W, via www.flickr.com) of three 63-foot (19 m) lattice girder iron spans.

Next was the minor Musgrave station to the west of the village of Great Musgrave. The line then curved to the northwest towards Warcop and after 1 1/2 miles (2.5 km) reached Warcop station. From Warcop the line continued northwest along the Eden valley north of the Eden crossing Coupland Beck after 3 1/2 miles (5.5 km) by a viaduct, (Note: Coupland Beck Viaduct viewed from the north, 54.562181°N 2.45738°W, via www.visitcumbria.com) and then continued to Appleby about 5 1/2 miles (9 km) after Warcop station.

Four miles (7 km) running northwest from Appleby the railway reached Kirkby Thore station, then just over 1 1/4 miles (2 km) west-northwest to Temple Sowerby station south of the village of the same name. The river Eden was crossed once more at Skygarth viaduct which had four lattice girders each of 98 feet 3 inches (29.95 m), whence the line ran roughly west to Cliburn railway station 1/2 mile (1 km) north of the village of Cliburn. The line then continued west, and curved south on a chord connecting it to a north facing junction near Clifton, Cumbria connecting the line to Clifton and Lowther station on the Lancaster & Carlisle Railway.

The line was built as a single track line and was worked by the Stockton and Darlington Railway from its inception, it opened for mineral trains on 8 April 1862, and for passengers on 9 June the same year.

=== 1862 to 1923: NER ===
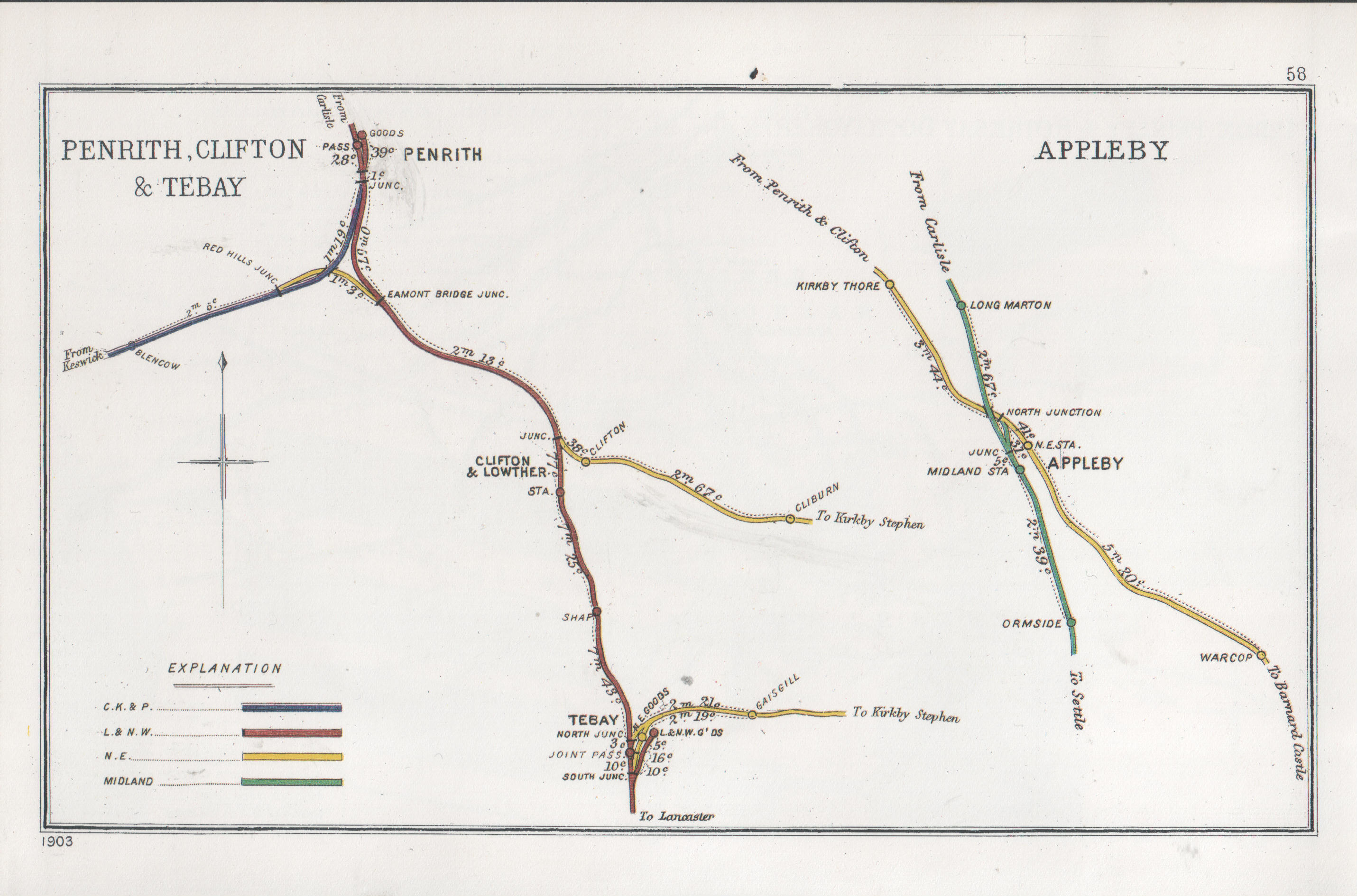
1914 Railway Clearing House diagram showing junctions at Clifton and Appleby

Soon after opening the amalgamation of the railway into the Stockton and Darlington Railway along with the South Durham and Lancashire Union Railway and Frosterly and Stanhope Railway was sanctioned by the Stockton and Darlington Railway (Amalgamation) Act 1862 (25 & 26 Vict. c. cvi) on 30 June 1862. The following year the Stockton and Darlington merged into the North Eastern Railway, and the Eden Valley line too became part of that larger system.

Eden Valley Railway Act 1862
- Act of Parliament
- Parliament of the United Kingdom
- Long title: An Act to enable the Eden Valley Railway Company to construct certain Extension and Branch Railways to use Portions of other Railways to raise additional Capital and for other Purposes.
- Citation: 25 & 26 Vict. c. cxviii

Dates
- Royal assent: 7 July 1862

Text of statute as originally enacted

During the construction of the railway, in 1861, an act of Parliament was passed that would increase the importance of the Eden Valley Line. This was the act permitting the construction of the Cockermouth, Keswick and Penrith Railway, which by 1865 had been opened. It connected to the Cockermouth and Workington Railway, and hence the ports and industrialised iron-rich regions of the west Cumbrian coast (Workington, Whitehaven) were linked to the Lancaster and Carlisle line (operated by the London and North Western Railway) near Penrith close to the Eden Valley's own junction. This made the Eden Valley line a route of choice for transport of materials between the north east and north west of England. Permission to build a connection allowing trains from the north to run directly onto the Eden Valley line was obtained in the Eden Valley Railway Act 1862 (25 & 26 Vict. c. cxviii), and the new section opened in 1863, along with a new station for Clifton (renamed Clifton Moor in 1927) on the chord. Eden Valley passenger trains now ran via this northern track, and had running powers on the L&CR line, now going to Penrith. After 1874 the southern chord was abandoned.

During the 1870s the Settle and Carlisle Railway was being constructed, which also ran through the upper Eden Valley. West of the station in Appleby in Westmorland a junction with the Eden Valley railway was built allowing trains travelling north to cross onto the westbound Eden Valley line. Further west the Settle line crossed over the Eden Valley line.

=== 1923 to 1948: LNER ===
In 1923, the Eden Valley Railway was grouped into the London and North Eastern Railway in accordance with the Railways Act 1921. On September 1, 1927, then Clifton station was given its current name, Clifton Moor station. This was to differentiate itself from Clifton and Lowther station, a part of the London Midland and Scottish Railway.

In 1936, the route going through Redhills to Penrith was removed, thereby limiting all future freight to transporting local goods.

During the interwar years, the Eden Valley line saw a gradual decline in passenger numbers, reflecting broader reductions in rural rail usage across northern England. The LNER maintained limited passenger services between Kirkby Stephen and Penrith, primarily to connect local communities with mainline services on the West Coast Main Line. Freight traffic mostly agricultural produce, coal, and limestone continued to provide modest revenue . During the Second World War, sections of the route were used to transport military supplies and personnel to nearby training grounds. However, by the mid-1940s, the line required significant maintenance investment, and following nationalisation in 1948, it was incorporated into the newly formed British Railways Eastern Region.

=== 1948 to 1989: British Railways ===
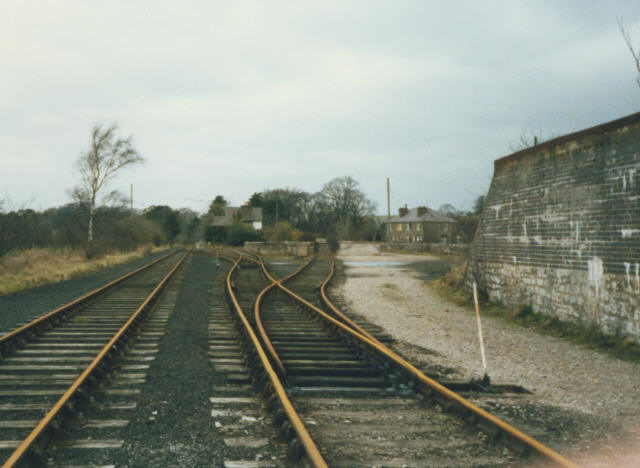
Ministry of Defence sidings at Warcop in 1989

In 1948 the railways of Britain were nationalised and the line became part of British Railways. In the following decade several stations closed: Musgrave station in 1952, Kirkby Thore in 1953, Temple Sowerby closed to passengers in 1953, and Cliburn station in 1956.

In 1958 a two car diesel multiple unit service was introduced. However between 1962 and 1963 the entire line closed to passengers. At the same time the Stainmore railway also closed completely apart from a short section of track eastwards from Kirkby Stephen East railway station to Merrygill Viaduct for the quarry nearby. From then on only freight trains used the line.

The line from Clifton to Appleby was also closed, and, from 1963 points east of Appleby could only be reached via the junction with the Settle and Carlisle railway at Appleby. Freight trains still ran from Appleby to Kirkby Stephen and then to Hartley Quarry (54.469763°N 2.326612°W). In 1974 that service ended and the track was removed except for about 5 1/2 miles (9 km) between Appleby and Warcop. Trains for the Warcop Training Area north of Warcop village ran until 1989.

== Preservation ==
The section of line between Appleby and Warcop has been restored by the Eden Valley Railway Trust, originally known as the Eden Valley Railway Society. At the southern end of the route, the Stainmore Railway Company has reinstated a short stretch of track near Kirkby Stephen East station.

Other than in the restored sections, none of the track remains in situ. Most of the trackbed remains as a feature on the landscape and as field boundaries. To the south east of Kirkby Thore the A66 road crosses the trackbed close to where Kirkby Thore station once stood, and the station was demolished when the road was remodelled in 1974. Clifton Moor, Cliburn, Temple Sowerby and Warcop and Musgrave railway stations are now private residences. Other features including the signal boxes at Cliburn and Warcop have survived. The bridges at Musgrave and Skygarth have been removed. The former junction west of Kirkby Stephen with the line to Tebay is now a nature reserve.
