= Kirkby Stephen East railway station =

Disused railway station in Cumbria, England

Coordinates: 54°27′44″N 2°21′30″W

Kirkby Stephen East railway station was situated on the South Durham & Lancashire Union Railway (known as the Stainmore Line) between Barnard Castle and Tebay. It served the town of Kirkby Stephen in England and was a junction station for the Eden Valley Railway.

The station re-opened to traffic as the base of the Stainmore Railway Company in August 2011. The new layout of the station consists of two platforms, one of which is partly covered by the remaining train shed roof, and a bay platform between them, situated in the opposite direction to the original station layout.

== History ==
The station opened to passenger traffic on 8 August 1861 and closed on 22 January 1962. Despite its rural location, this was a busy station in its heyday. Starting in 1932, two expresses to Blackpool – one from Newcastle and the other from Darlington – both stopped at the station for about five minutes, before continuing towards Blackpool. The return trips also passed through later in the day. The station was also used by the Durham Miners special between 1932 and 1936.

=== Stationmasters ===
From 1932, the position of Station Master at Kirkby Stephen was amalgamated with that of locomotive superintendent.

- William Hogg 1861 - 1894
- William Turner until 1897 (formerly station master at Crook, afterwards station master at Richmond)
- Irving Ruddock 1897 - 1920
- F. Smith 1920 - 1930 (formerly station master at Ruswarp)
- John Bousfield 1930 - 1932
- R. Thompson 1932 - 1933 (also station master at Barras and Smardale)
- Mr. Barr 1933
- Thomas Grayson 1933 - 1935(formerly station master at Beckermet)
- W. Tinniswood 1935 - 1936 (formerly station master at Giggleswick, afterwards station master at Wennington)
- Percy Sarginson 1936 - ca. 1957 (formerly station master at Grayrigg)

== Closure ==
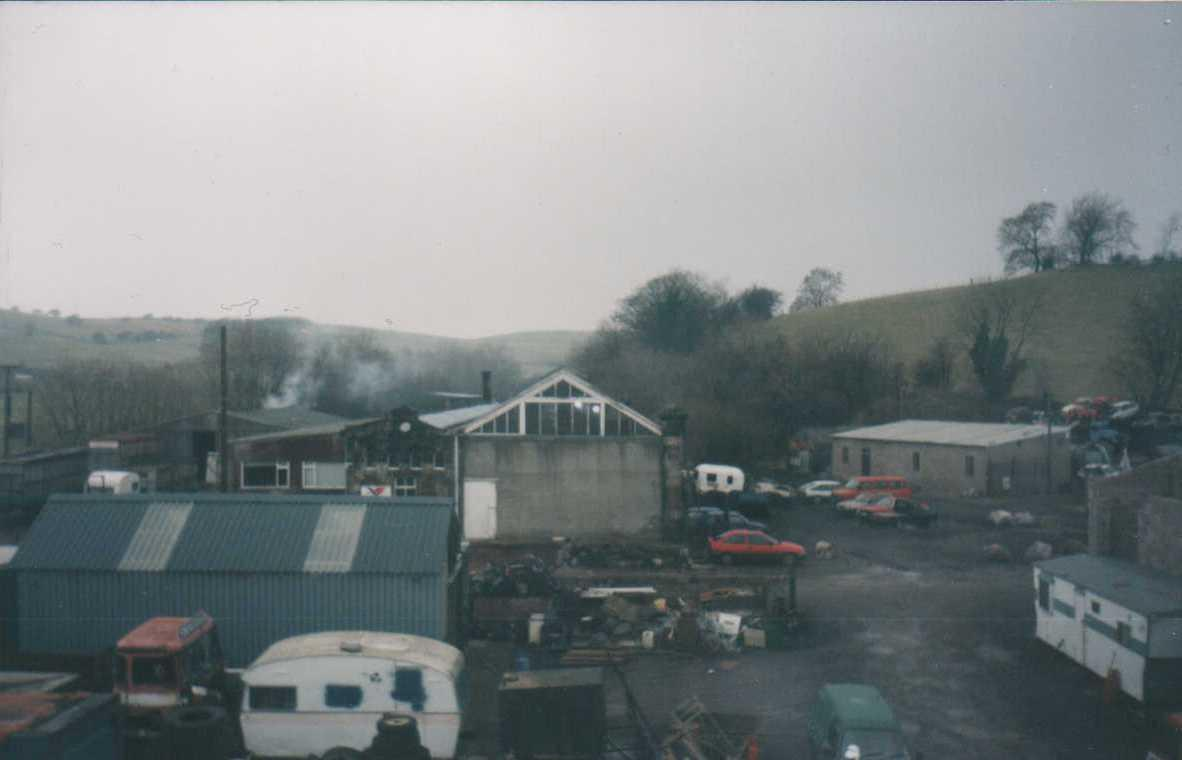
Kirkby Stephen East railway station in 1997, looking west from the A685 bridge

The station closed to passengers in 1962, and was eventually repurposed as a bobbin mill. The bobbin factory subsequently closed in 1992, after the company had fallen into receivership. On the other side of the road bridge, the remaining yard space and goods shed was converted into a caravan park and campsite. The goods shed is still standing to this day.

== Restoration ==
In 1996, a company called Stainmore Properties Ltd. was formed, with the intention to convert KSE into a heritage centre representing the early 1950s. Stainmore Properties Ltd. purchased the derelict remains of the station and 6.5 acres of surrounding land. In the year 2000, another company, Stainmore Railway Company, was formed to help with the restoration of the site. Since then, essential repairs have been made to the roof and station, a number of rooms have been restored and a short section of track has been laid along the formation of the old Eden Valley Line, with some sidings and yard infrastructure within the station area and surroundings.

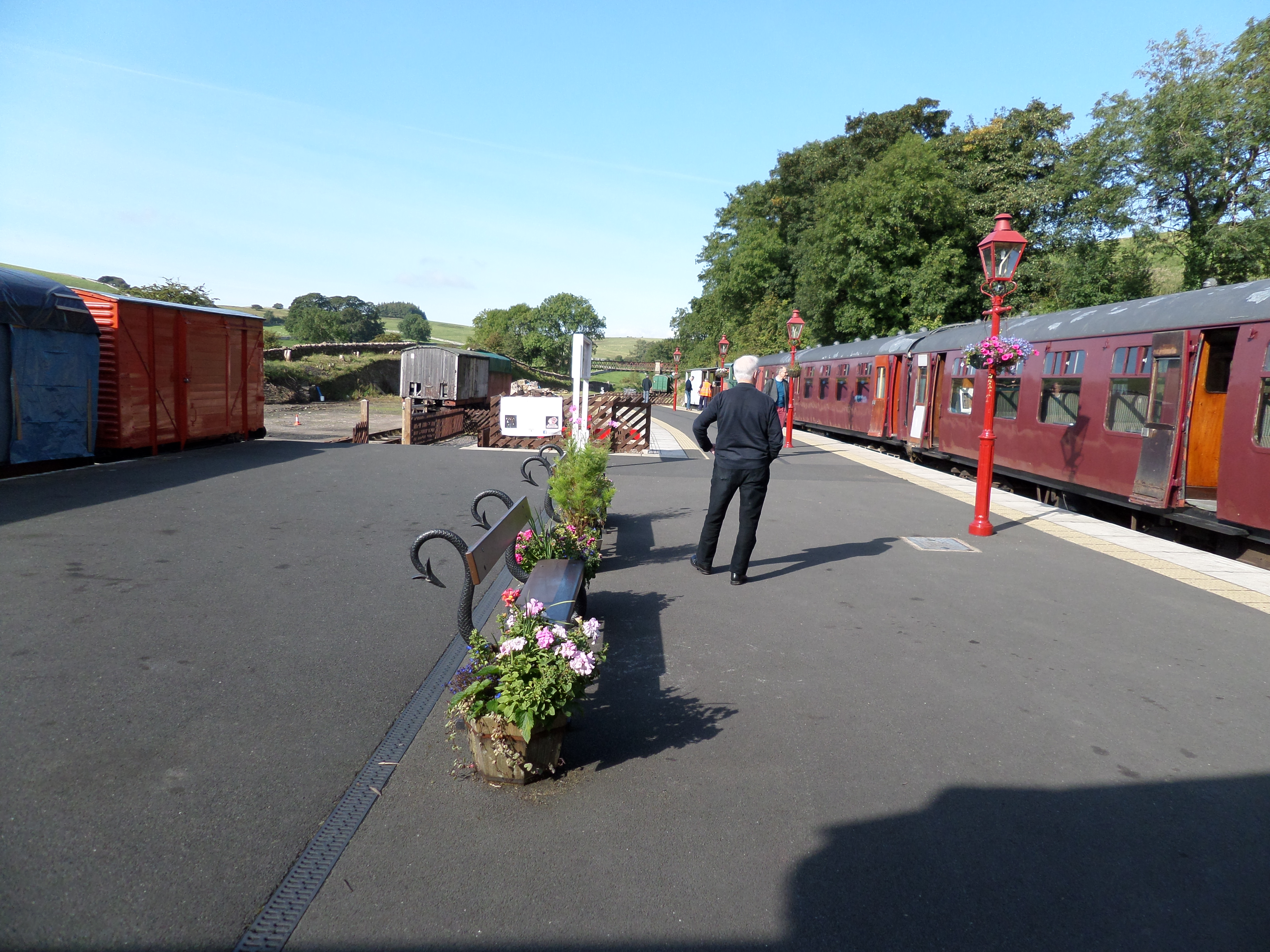
Heritage platform layout, looking west from station building

August 2011 marked the 150th anniversary of the railway. To commemorate this occasion a series of events were held during 2011, leading up to 'Stainmore 150', a large gala, where Steve Davis, the head of the National Railway Museum, drove the first fare-paying passenger train from the station in over 50 years, hauled by former Kirkby Stephen locomotive BR Standard Class 2 2-6-0 no. 78019. In 2013 the Stainmore Railway Company began its first operating season, running Peckett and Sons 0-4-0 'F C Tingey' on some weekends. In 2014 this was joined by Yorkshire Engine Company 'Stanton 50' which operates diesel hauled trains on some weekends when there is no steam service.

In June 2017 it was announced that a joint Heritage Lottery Fund bid by the Stainmore Railway Company and the Locomotive Conservation and Learning Trust, to restore both LNER J21 65033 and a former North Eastern Railway stores van, no. 5523, as an interpretation vehicle to travel with the locomotive, had been successful. As part of the joint bid, it was agreed that, once restoration is completed, the locomotive will be based at Kirkby Stephen East and become the project's flagship locomotive. As a result of this, work is currently under way to create a vastly more flexible track layout within the station yard, as well as building a new restoration shed and authentic locomotive watering facilities. As part of the new work, a short stretch of the former South Durham & Lancashire Union Railway formation across Bridge 149 has been reinstated.

== See also ==
- Stainmore Railway Company
- Kirkby Stephen West railway station

Preceding station	Heritage railways	Following station
Musgrave; Future	Stainmore Railway Company	Terminus
	Disused railways	
Smardale	South Durham & Lancashire Union Railway	Barras
Musgrave	Eden Valley Railway	Barras
