= St Oswald's Church, Ravenstonedale =

Coordinates: 54.4330°N 2.4296°W

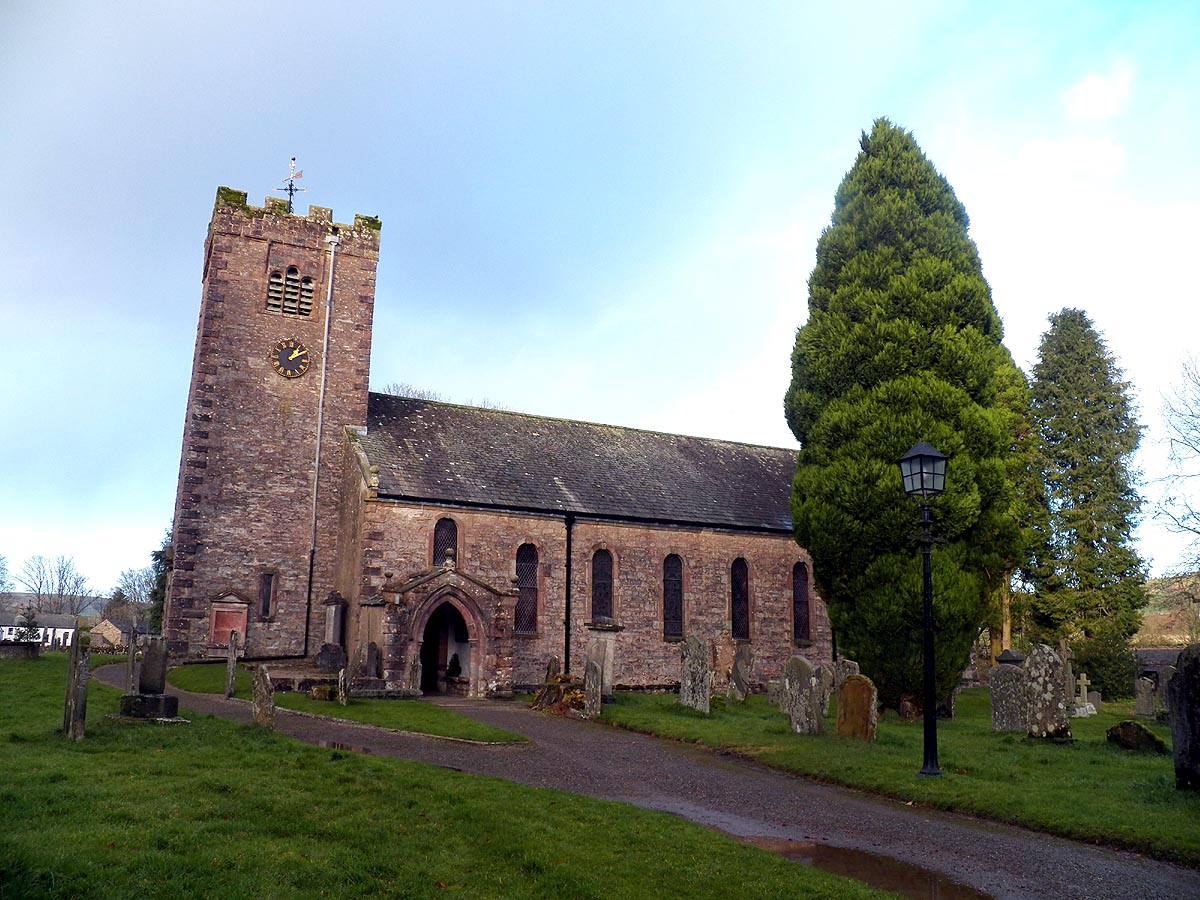
- St Oswald's Church, Ravenstonedale, from the south

- Location in Cumbria
- OS grid reference: NY 722 043
- Location: Ravenstonedale, Cumbria
- Country: England
- Denomination: Anglican
- Website: St Oswald, Ravenstonedale

History
- Status: Parish church
- Dedication: Saint Oswald

Architecture
- Functional status: Active
- Heritage designation: Grade I
- Designated: 6 February 1968
- Architectural type: Church
- Style: Neoclassical
- Completed: 1744

Specifications
- Materials: Stone, slate roofs

Administration
- Province: York
- Diocese: Carlisle
- Archdeaconry: Carlisle
- Deanery: Appleby
- Parish: Ravenstonedale with Newbiggin-on-Lune

Clergy
- Vicar: Vacant from April 2021

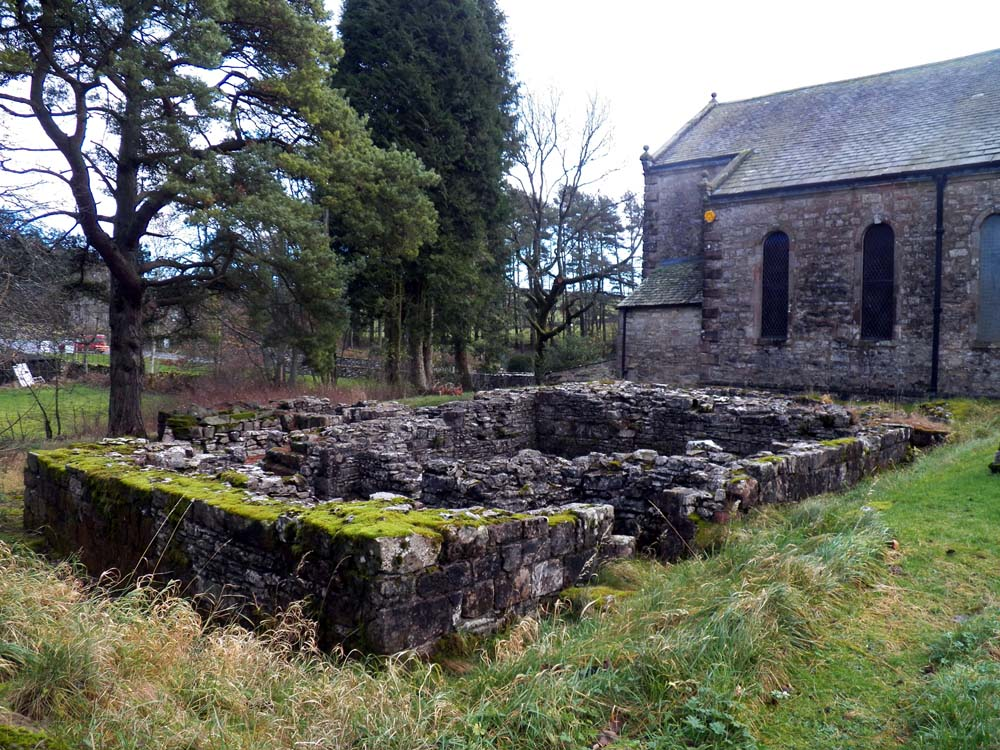
Ruins to the north of the church

St Oswald's Church is in the village of Ravenstonedale, Cumbria, England. It is an active Anglican parish church in the deanery of Appleby, the archdeaconry of Carlisle, and the diocese of Carlisle. Its benefice is united with those of All Saints, Orton, and St James, Tebay. The church is recorded in the National Heritage List for England as a designated Grade I listed building.

== History ==
The tower of the church was built in 1738, and the rest in 1744, incorporating fabric from an earlier church on the site. From a 17th-century description, it is probable that the earlier church was Norman in style.

== Architecture ==
=== Exterior ===
The church is constructed in rubble stone with rusticated quoins, and has slate roofs. Its plan consists of an eight-bay nave with north and south porches, a short chancel, and a west tower. The tower is in three stages with a west doorway. There are bell openings on the north and south sides. The parapet is embattled. Along the sides of the church are eight windows with semicircular heads and projecting keystones. At the east end are two windows.

=== Interior ===
The authors of the Buildings of England series describe the interior of the church as being "atmospheric". There is a west gallery, beneath which is a narrow cross-passage. The seating is arranged as that of a college chapel, each side facing the middle, and consists of six ranks of box pews. In the middle of the north side of the church is a three-decker pulpit with a sounding board. The chancel arch incorporates medieval fabric. On each side of the chancel arch is a painted text board, and there is a panel painted with the royal arms of George II opposite the pulpit. There is another painted panel, formerly a clock face, dated 1719. The font consists of an 18th-century bowl on an earlier stem. The east window contains stained glass to the memory of Mrs Gaunt who, according to the inscription, was "the last female martyr burnt at Tyburn for the cause of the Protestant religion" in 1685. This window was made by Shrigley and Hunt in 1889. The other stained glass includes a window of 1925 designed by J. E. Nuttgens for Powell's depicting Saint Margaret of Scotland, and one by D. Cottier dated 1890 depicting Saint Cecilia. Also in the church is an 18th-century monument to members of the Fothergill family. The two-manual pipe organ was made in 1891 by Harrison and Harrison. In the tower are three bells, but these are no longer ringable; they date respectively from about 1530, from 1694, and from 1743.

== External features ==
In the churchyard to the south of the church is the stump of a cross-shaft and base which possibly date from before the Norman conquest. Fastened to the top of the cross-shaft is a brass sundial plate dated 1700. The whole structure has been listed at Grade II. To the north of the church are the ruined foundations of the east range of the former cloister of the Gilbertine Ravenstonedale Priory dating from the 13th or 14th century. This is designated as a scheduled monument.

== See also ==
- Grade I listed churches in Cumbria
- Grade I listed buildings in Cumbria
- Listed buildings in Ravenstonedale
