= Elizabeth Gaunt =

Convicted traitor, burned at the stake

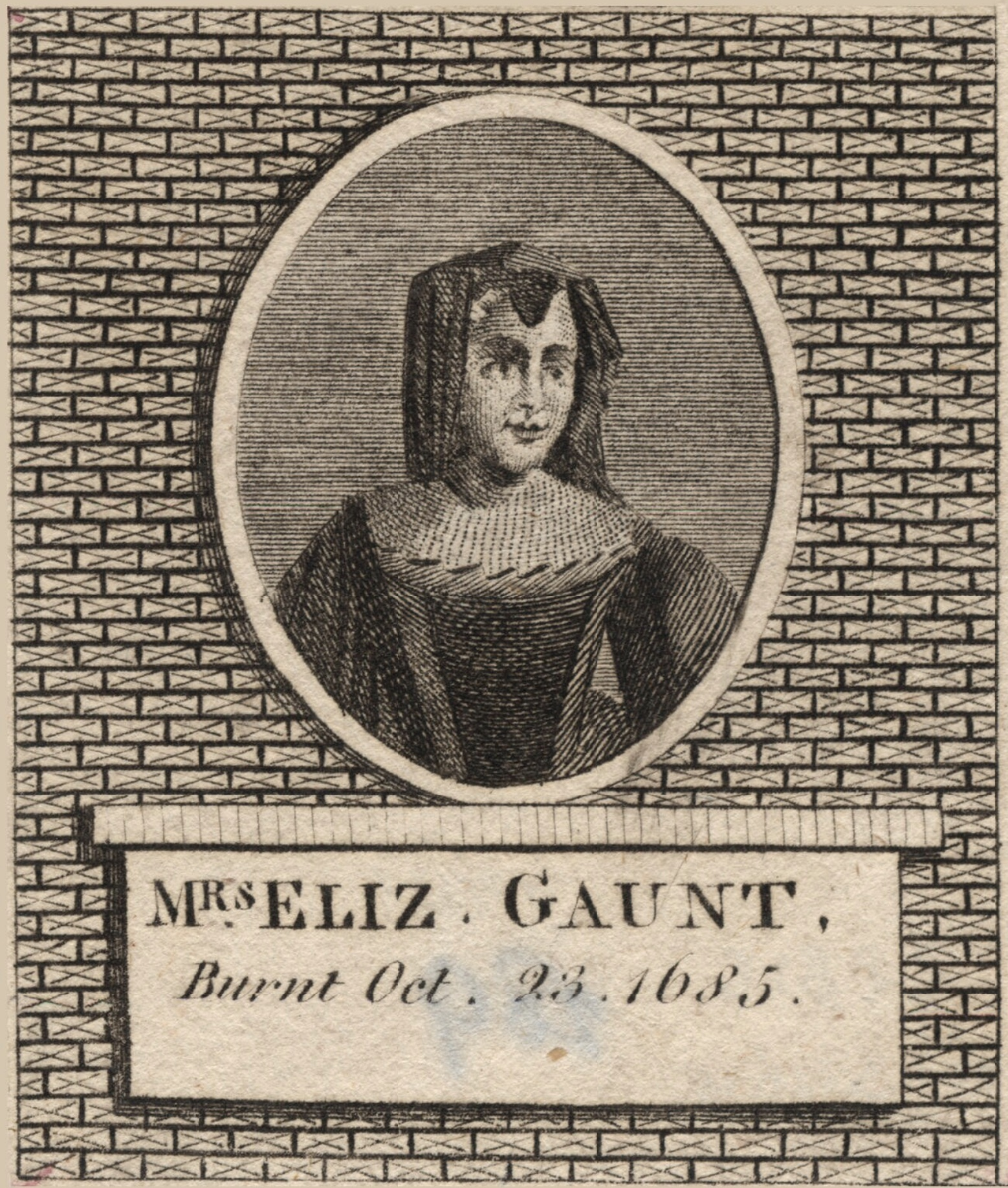
18th-century portrait of Gaunt

Elizabeth Gaunt (died 23 October 1685) was an English woman sentenced to death for treason after having been convicted for involvement in the Rye House Plot. She was the last woman executed for a political crime in England, and the last woman executed in England by burning alive.

Gaunt was an Anabaptist shopkeeper in London. She and her husband William lived in the parish of St Mary, Whitechapel. They were involved in Whig politics. She was the daughter of Anthony Fothergill of Brownber, Ravenstonedale, and was well known to give shelter to persecuted people, such as victims of religious and political oppression. According to Bishop Burnet, she spent "her life in acts of charity, visiting the gaols and looking after the poor of what persuasion soever they were". She helped one of the participants of the failed Rye House Plot of 1683, James Burton, to escape to Amsterdam. After his arrest in 1685, Burton implicated her as an accomplice in the hope of saving his life. She was in fact not involved in the conspiracy and the trial against her was seen as a show trial. David Hume wrote, "He received a pardon as a recompense for his treachery and she was burnt alive for her charity." She was sentenced to death for treason in the Old Bailey on 19 October 1685.

Gaunt considered the trial to be a martyrdom and reportedly behaved with such good humour that the audience was moved to tears. She was executed by burning, and, as she was denied strangulation, she was literally burned alive. William Penn witnessed the execution and reported that she "died with a constancy, even to a cheerfulness, that struck all that saw it."
