= Smardale railway station =

Disused railway station in Cumbria, England

Coordinates: 54.4687°N 2.4018°W

Smardale railway station was a minor station on the South Durham & Lancashire Union Railway between Tebay and Kirkby Stephen East. It served the villages of Smardale and Waitby. The station opened to passenger traffic on 8 August 1861, and closed on 1 December 1952.

== Description and history ==
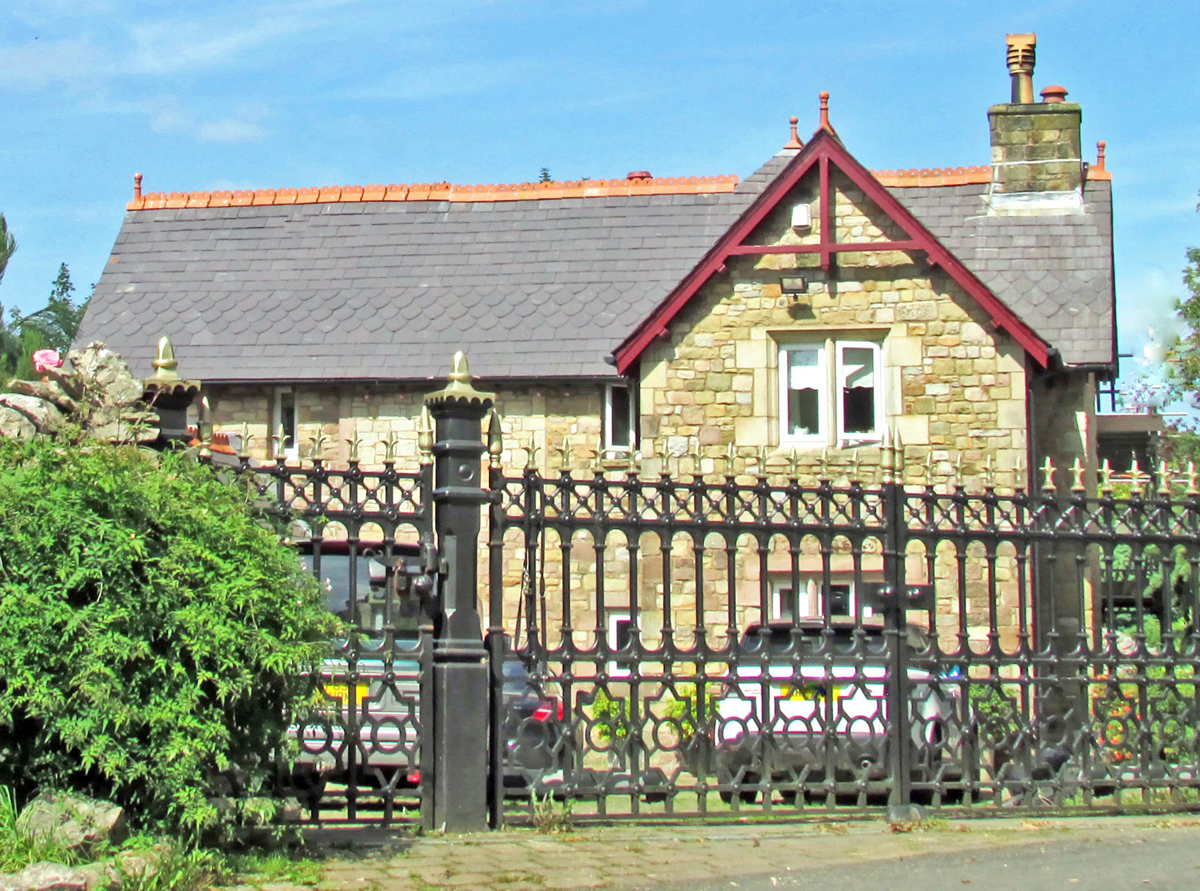
Smardale railway station building in 2016

At the time of its opening in 1861 the only habitation in the village of Smardale was Smardale Hall. The station consisted of a single platform on the south side of the line, and stone built station buildings as well as two goods sidings.

A signal box was added in the 1890s. During the First World War from 20 September 1915 the station closed being used as a halt but unstaffed. It reopened in 1919. The signal box was removed in the 1920s, and the station closed in 1952.

In 2002 the preservation society Stainmore Railway Company (at Kirkby Stephen East) recovered two wagons which had derailed near the station and been left undisturbed for half a century. As of 2013 the Stationmaster's house was still extant and formed the basis of an expanded private residence.

Preceding station	Disused railways	Following station
Ravenstonedale	South Durham & Lancashire Union Railway	Kirkby Stephen East
