= Smardale =

Village in Cumbria, England

Coordinates: 54.468°N 2.403°W

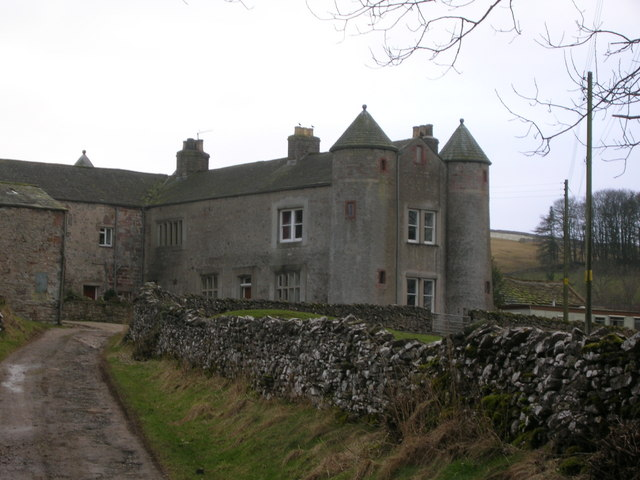
- Smardale Hall, Smardale

- Location in Eden, Cumbria Location within Cumbria
- OS grid reference: NY738081
- Civil parish: Waitby
- Unitary authority: Westmorland and Furness
- Ceremonial county: Cumbria
- Region: North West
- Country: England
- Sovereign state: United Kingdom
- Post town: KIRKBY STEPHEN
- Postcode district: CA17
- Dialling code: 017683
- Police: Cumbria
- Fire: Cumbria
- Ambulance: North West
- UK Parliament: Westmorland and Lonsdale

Smardale is a small village and former civil parish, now in the parish of Waitby, in the Westmorland and Furness district, in Cumbria, England. In 1891 the parish had a population of 36.

== Geography and history ==
The village of Smardale lies in hilly agricultural land at a height of around 220 m (720 ft) 1.1 miles (1.75 km) southeast of Crosby Garrett and 2.2 miles (3.5 km) west of Kirkby Stephen. To the south is Smardale fell whilst a boundary is formed to the west by Scandal Beck which flows from Smardalegill, a narrow valley to the southwest.

The name Smaredale may derive from smere, an ancient name for clover, or from the old Norse or old English for butter/fat/grease giving either valley of butter or valley of clover.

Chapel well, a Holy well, is found west of Scandal Beck where it once stood within Smardale church. There are also other signs of ancient human activity: the archaeological remains of settlements are found on Smardale fell, and around Smardalegill, pillow mounds, known locally as 'Giant's graves' which are thought by some to be for drying bracken, and not for rabbits. Oxenbrow wood, to the north of Smardale village is the site of a Heronry.

Smardale was formerly a township in Kirkby-Stephen parish, from 1866 Smardale was a civil parish in its own right until it was abolished on 30 December 1894 and merged with Waitby.

=== Smardale Hall ===
There has been a substantial dwelling in Smardale since at least the 14th century; a tower house, a remnant of which, a newel, now forms part of the structure of the south eastern part of the current house.

The current buildings date from 15th and 16th centuries; being originally built on a courtyard plan with the tower incorporated into an east wing, now demolished. The southern part of the hall (now farm buildings) was the original great hall. Sir George Dalston, the castles occupant from 1761 made considerable alterations to the structure. The west wing, which is the current hall is unusual in having four conically roofed round towers at the corners of the structure, giving the structure an appearance similar to the Scottish baronial style of architecture.

The hall and associated buildings are Grade II* listed structures (since 1968). There is evidence for an earlier fortified structure from a motte and ditch discovered north of the hall.

=== Smardale Gill ===
Smardalegill is a small steep-sided valley connecting Smardale and the valley of the River Eden with the eastern end of the valley of the River Lune. Scandal Beck runs north-northeast through it, as does the former Stainmore Railway.

Smardale Gill quarry was a large limestone quarry on the west side of Smardale Gill. Lime was produced on site at two limekilns with raw materials brought to the top of the kilns using an inclined plane and a stationary engine. A railway siding on the Stainmore line next to the kilns allowed lime to be carried away by rail. The limekilns and evidence of the engine house and inclined plane are extant.

Smardale Gill nature reserve is a national nature reserve (NNR) and Site of Special Scientific Interest managed by the Cumbria Wildlife Trust. Land in Smardale Gill was first acquired in 1978. Later in 1991 the reserve acquired the trackbed of the former Stainmore railway from Smardale to Brownber from British Rail The site contains both woodland and grassland habitats and is a good example of a limestone habitat.

At the south end of the valley on the border with Ravenstonedale civil parish is the 18th-century arched stone packhorse bridge known as Smardale bridge, now a Grade II listed structure.

There is a small disused sandstone quarry at the south of the gill.

=== Railways ===
Two railway lines ran through Smardale and past the village. The Stainmore Railway passed Smardale on the northern edge of the village, where there was a small halt, Smardale railway station (now a private dwelling). Going westwards it then crossed under the Settle to Carlisle railway line just east of Scandal Beck before curving south through Smardalegill along the east bank. Within Smardalegill the line crosses the beck at a shallow angle by Smardalegill Viaduct. The Settle to Carlisle railway line passes Smardale village to the south, travelling east–west; to the west the line crosses Scandal Beck by Smardale Viaduct.

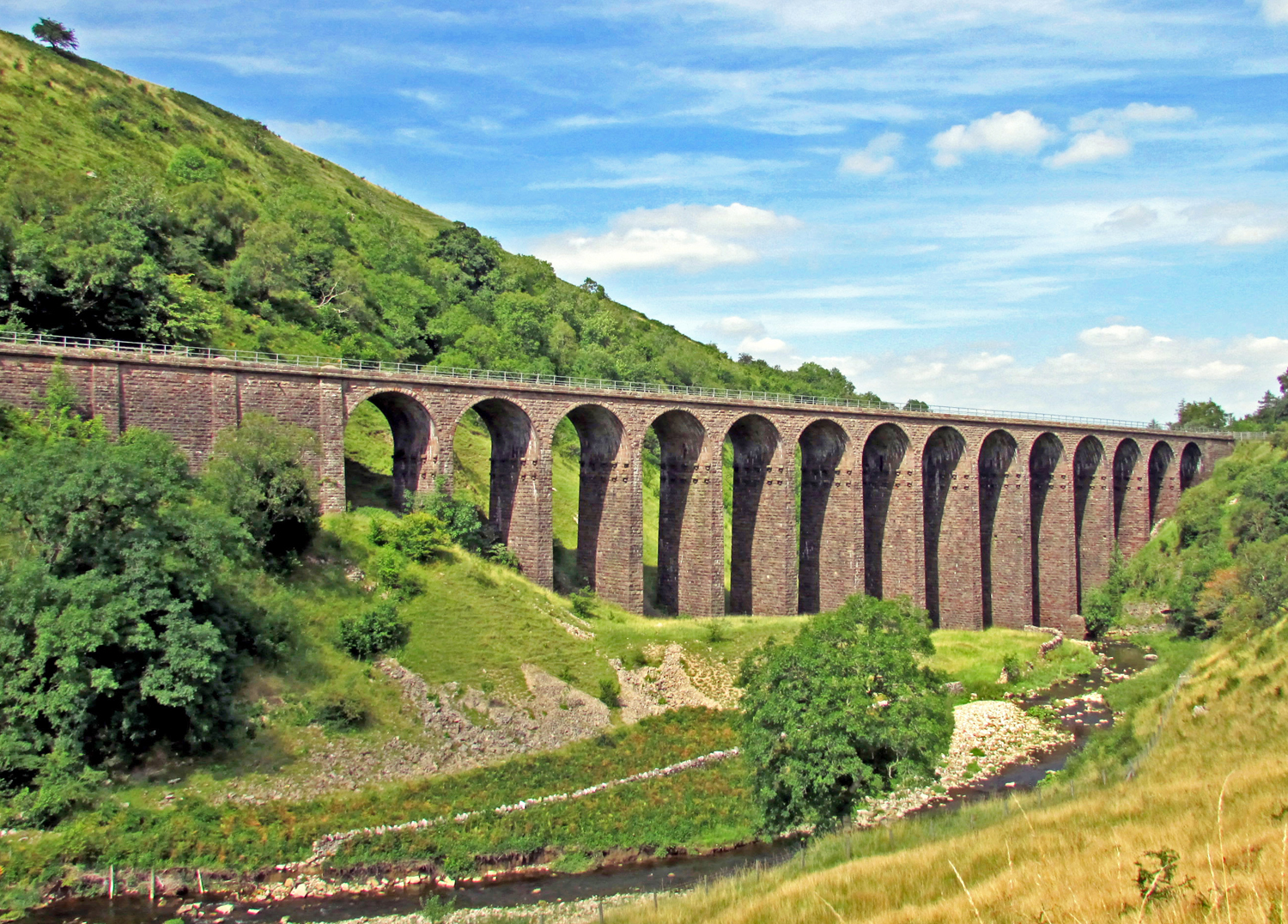
Smardale Gill Viaduct from the southwest

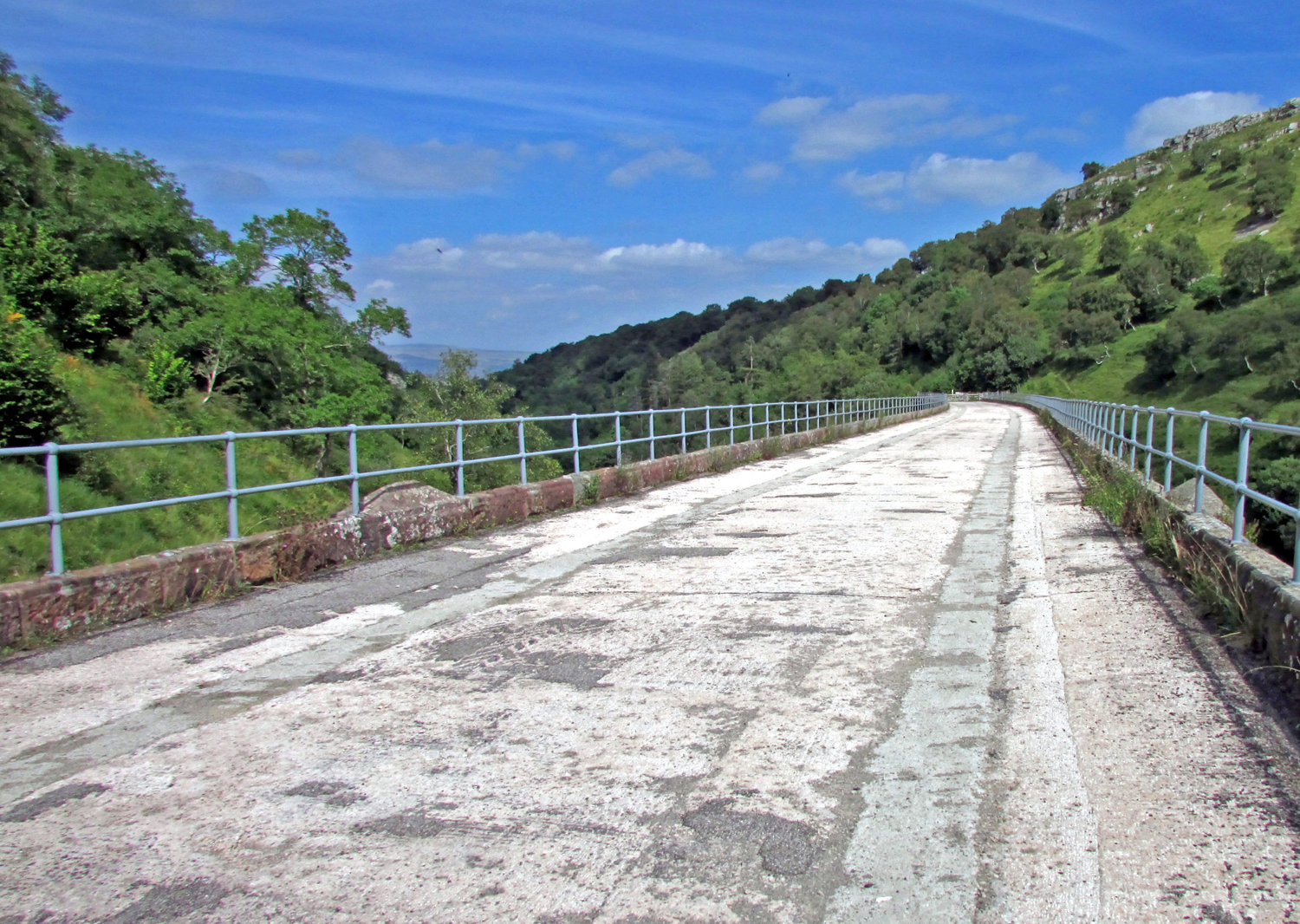
Smardale Gill Viaduct's restored upper deck for use by walkers

Smardale Gill Viaduct predates Smardale Viaduct, being complete in 1861. The viaduct was designed by Sir Thomas Bouch for the South Durham and Lancashire Union Railway and the construction contracted to Mr Wrigg, costing £11,928 to build. The bridge, which was built of local stone has 14 arches, and is 90 ft (27 m) high and 550 ft (170 m) long. The line across it remained single tracked despite the structure being wide enough for a double line.

After the line closed in 1962 the viaduct fell into disrepair, by the 1980s the structure had become dangerous and was to be demolished. Instead the viaduct became a listed building, and British Rail offered £230,000 (the estimated cost of demolition) towards its restoration. A charitable trust, the Northern Viaduct Trust was formed in 1989. The cost of repairs was £350,000 which included masonry repair, a new deck and waterproofing, and structural work to the viaduct. In 1992 the restoration was complete, the viaduct being subsequently used for pedestrian access to Smardale Gill nature reserve.

In 2010 after a harsh winter it was found that the viaduct had frost damage and required a further £30,000 of repairs.

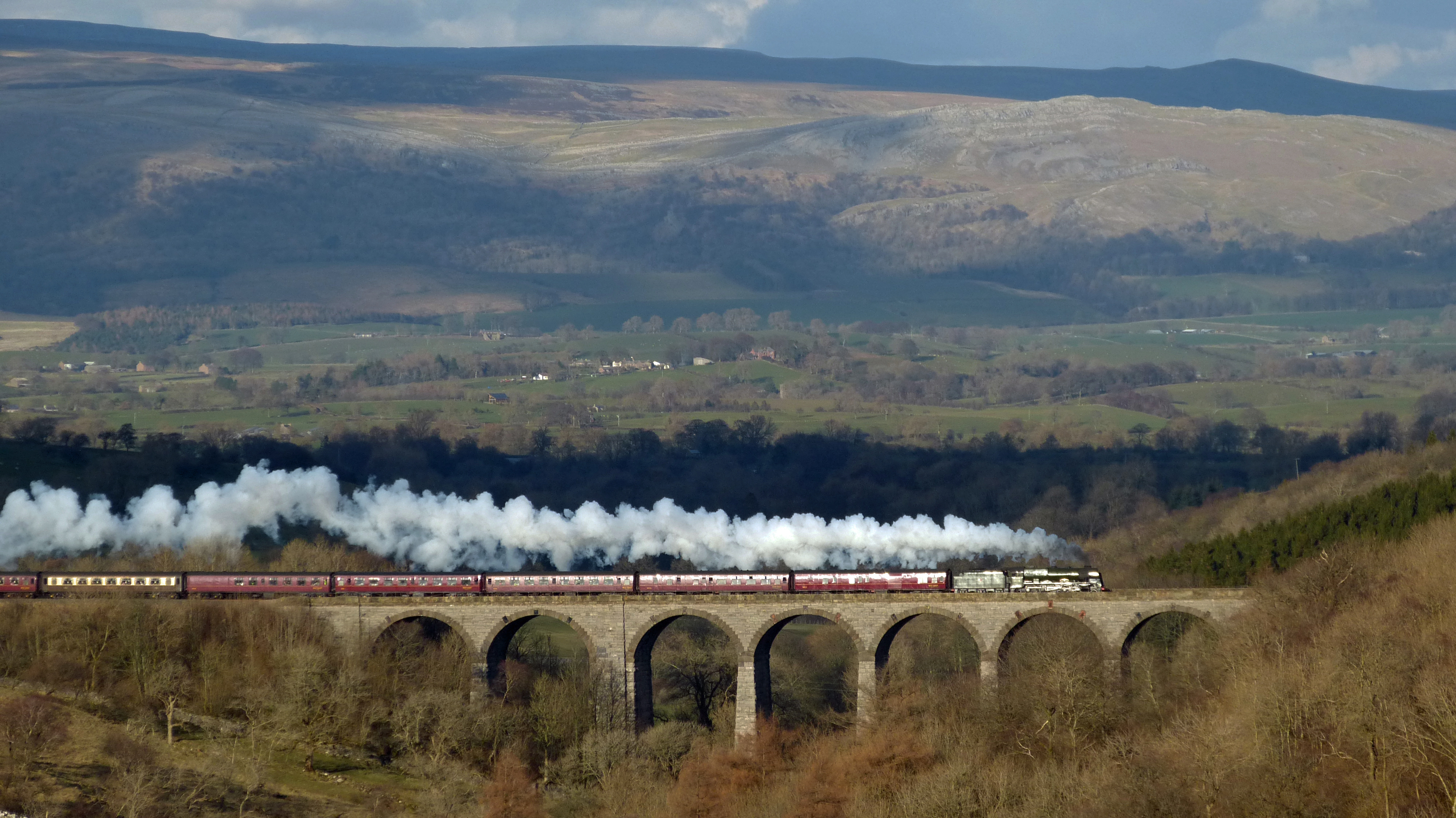
Smardale Viaduct

Smardale Viaduct was built by the contractors Benton & Woodiwiss for the Settle to Carlisle Line of the Midland Railway. The viaduct is 710 ft (220 m) long and 130 ft (40 m) high, the highest on the line. Over 60,000 long tons (61,000 t) of stone was used in its construction. Local limestone was used for its construction, the arch quoins were of millstone grit. Two of the twelve piers – the fourth and the tenth are of considerably heavier construction. The bridge opened in August 1875 having taken five years to construct, it crosses both Scandal Beck and the former Stainmore railway line.

== See also ==
- Listed buildings in Waitby
