= Sandwath Beck =

River in Cumbria, England

Coordinates: 54.4404°N 2.4881°W

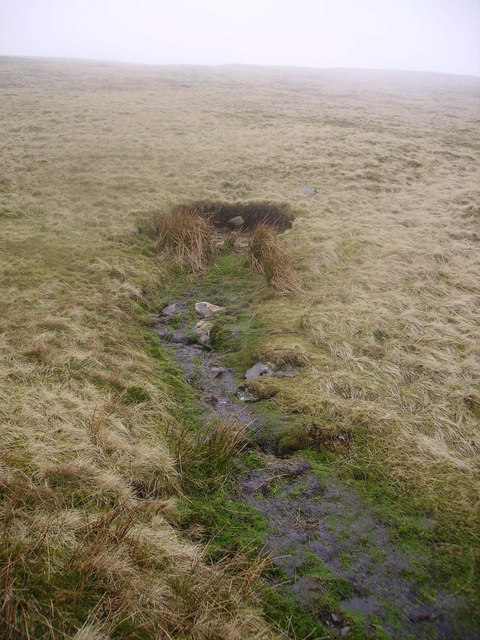
The source of Dale Gill

Sandwath Beck is a river running through Cumbria in England.

The beck rises beneath Green Bell in Ravenstonedale as Dale Gill, changing its designation to Greenside Beck when it passes the village of Greenside.

The stream turns west at Sandwath Beck, taking its name from the settlement, and picks up a number of rills as tributaries, before it reaches Wath, at which point it combines with Weasdale Beck to form the River Lune.
