= Swindale Beck =

Swindale Beck may refer to:

- Swindale Beck (Brough), river in Cumbria, England, joining the River Eden at Great Musgrave
- Swindale Beck (Dufton), river in Cumbria, England, with source on Knock Fell
- Swindale Beck (Hilton) flows along the base of Swindale Crag east of Hilton, Cumbria
- Swindale Beck (Lowther), river in Shap Rural parish, Cumbria, England, a tributary of River Lowther
- Great Swindale and Little Swindale, on Ravenstonedale Common, tributaries of Weasdale Beck
