= Weasdale =

Hamlet in Cumbria, England

Coordinates: 54.428°N 2.478°W

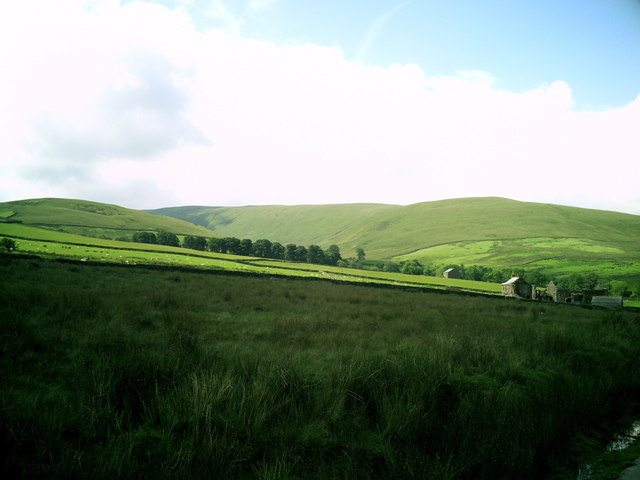
- Weasdale Farm, with Hooksey Hill behind

- Location in Eden, Cumbria Location within Cumbria
- OS grid reference: NY689037
- Civil parish: Ravenstonedale
- Unitary authority: Westmorland and Furness
- Ceremonial county: Cumbria
- Region: North West
- Country: England
- Sovereign state: United Kingdom
- Post town: KIRKBY STEPHEN
- Postcode district: CA17
- Dialling code: 015396
- Police: Cumbria
- Fire: Cumbria
- Ambulance: North West
- UK Parliament: Westmorland and Lonsdale

Weasdale is a small hamlet in Cumbria, England, 850 feet (260 m) above sea-level on the northern flanks of the Howgill Fells. It is located approximately 6 miles (10 km) south-west of Kirkby Stephen. Weasdale Beck rises to the south of, and passes through, the settlement and is the major feeder to the nascent River Lune, which it meets near its crossing of the nearby A685 Kendal to Brough road. The properties there date from late 16th to mid-19th Century.

The hamlet contains a tree-and-shrub nursery.
