= Ravenstonedale railway station =

Disused railway station in Cumbria, England

Coordinates: 54.4427°N 2.4634°W

Ravenstonedale railway station was situated on the South Durham & Lancashire Union Railway (SD&LUR) between Tebay and Kirkby Stephen East. It served the villages of Ravenstonedale and Newbiggin-on-Lune.

== History ==
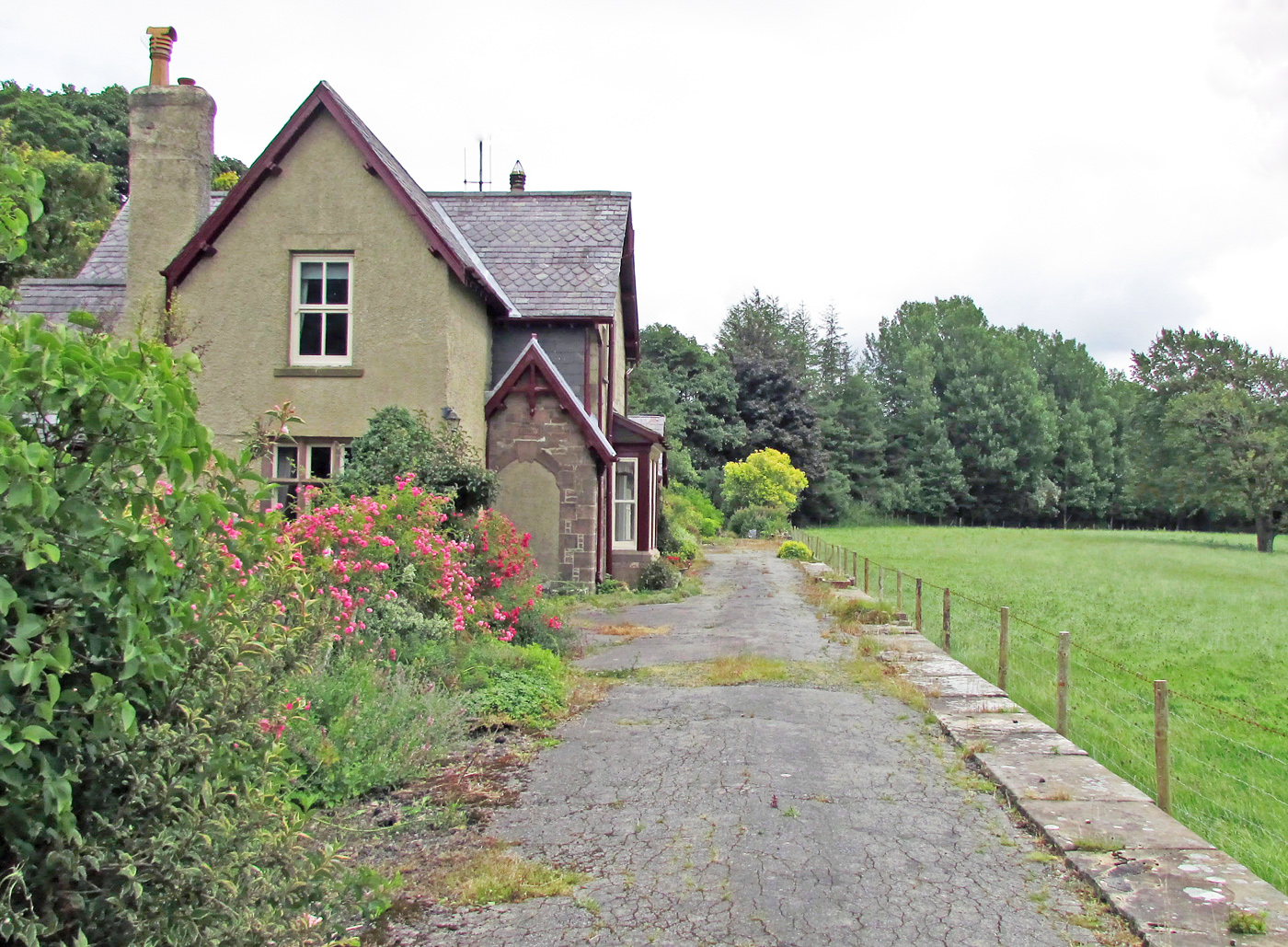
Ravenstonedale station building and eastbound platform as surviving in 2016

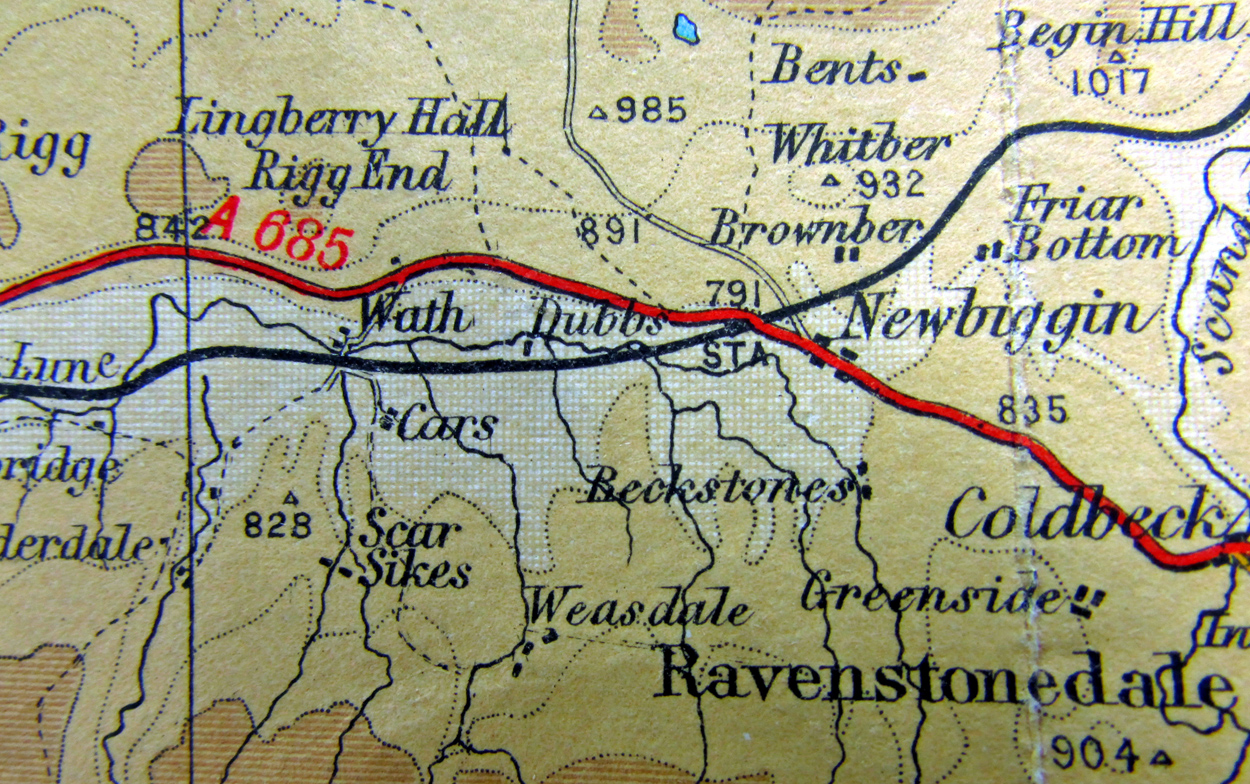
Location of the station on 1935 map

The station was built by the SD&LUR, which was promoted by the Stockton and Darlington Railway (S&DR) and was opened on 8 August 1861. It was initially named Newbiggin until it was renamed Ravenstonedale on 1 January 1877. The SD&LUR was merged into the S&DR on 1 January 1863 and the latter was merged into the North Eastern Railway (NER) on 13 July 1863.

The station had two passenger platforms and a small goods siding. The main station building was erected on the northerly (eastbound) side of the line next to the road from Tebay to Ravenstonedale and Kirkby Stephen.

On the railway grouping of 1 January 1923, the NER became part of the London and North Eastern Railway and British Railways North Eastern Region took over the passenger services on nationalization on 1 January 1948.

The station was host to a LNER camping coach from 1937 to 1939 and possibly one for some of 1934.

Passenger services were withdrawn and the station closed on 1 December 1952 and the line closed completely on 22 January 1962.

Preceding station	Disused railways	Following station
Gaisgill	South Durham & Lancashire Union Railway	Smardale
