= Waitby =

Village and civil parish in Cumbria, England

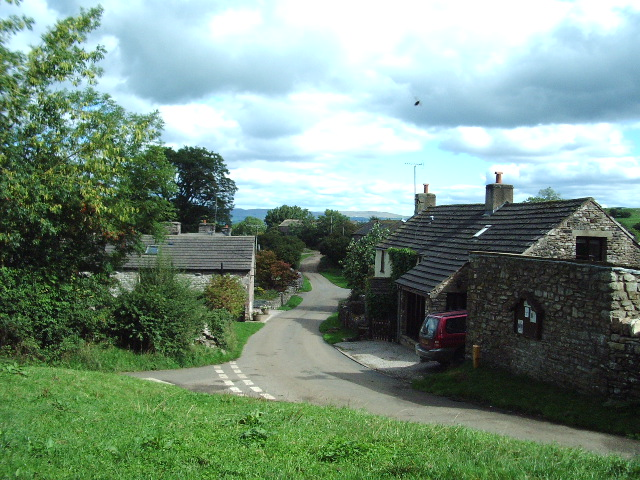
- Waitby

- Location in Eden, Cumbria Location within Cumbria
- Population: 60 (2001)
- OS grid reference: NY7508
- Civil parish: Waitby
- Unitary authority: Westmorland and Furness
- Ceremonial county: Cumbria
- Region: North West
- Country: England
- Sovereign state: United Kingdom
- Post town: KIRKBY STEPHEN
- Postcode district: CA17
- Dialling code: 01768
- Police: Cumbria
- Fire: Cumbria
- Ambulance: North West
- UK Parliament: Westmorland and Lonsdale

Waitby is a small village and civil parish in Westmorland and Furness Unitary Authority of Cumbria, England. The parish contains two small villages, Waitby and Smardale, plus the small hamlets of Riddlesay, Stripes and Leases, all of which are in the farmed and enclosured northern part at an elevation of around 200–300m. The southern half of the parish is mostly heath and unused for agriculture, it rises to Smardale fell; which it includes, at elevations between 300 and 400m. The civil parish of Ravenstonedale forms the boundary to the south. The western border with Crosby Garrett civil parish is formed by Scandal Beck. To the north and east lie Soulby and Kirkby Stephen civil parishes respectively. The population of the civil parish as measured at the 2011 Census was less than 100. Details are included in the parish of Crosby Garrett.

Waitby Beck rises from springs to the north east of the Waitby, joining Sandwith Sike which flows into the River Eden. Other minor becks include Hazel Gill and Choup Gill both of which join Scandal Beck.

The Settle & Carlisle line passes through the parish, as did the South Durham & Lancashire Union Railway; both cross Scandal Beck by Smardale Viaduct and Smardalegill Viaducts respectively.

== Toponymy ==
Waitby (originally Watebi c.1170) means "wet farmstead" from the Old Norse vátr (wet) + by (farm. cf "byre") The village may have also been known as Wadeby or Waldeby; the alternative etymology "Waldeve's dwelling" has also been proposed.

== Other features ==
Waitby Greenriggs nature reserve 54.46957°N 2.370636°W lies east of Waitby outside the parish boundary halfway to Kirkby Stephen at the former junction between the South Durham & Lancashire Union Railway (Stainmore railway) and the Eden Valley Railway. It was purchased from British Rail in 1987 and is part of the Cumbria Wildlife Trust.

== History ==
=== Waitby Castle ===
Waitby castle 54.469394°N 2.376469°W is a typical romano-British fortification built on top of a small hill. The banks ringing the roughly round enclosure are still visible as are the outlines of some inner buildings.

=== Waitby and Smardale school ===
Waitby and Smardale school was founded in 1630 as a free school for the children of the villages of Waitby and Smardale by James Highmoor, a London weaver born in Kirkby Stephen with the gift of £100 for its upkeep and to employ a schoolmaster. The school was rebuilt in 1867 by public subscription.

Now named Waitby School the building is a grade II listed building and has been converted into holiday accommodation.

There is also a football team in waitby called waitby fc

=== Other listed structures ===
Leases farmhouse (18th/19th century) and a nearby 19th century barn and boundary stone near Leases are grade II listed structures. The 18th century Wharton House and later threshing barn in Waitby are also grade II listed buildings.

== See also ==
- Listed buildings in Waitby
