= Bowderdale =

Hamlet in Cumbria, England

Coordinates: 54.436°N 02.497°W

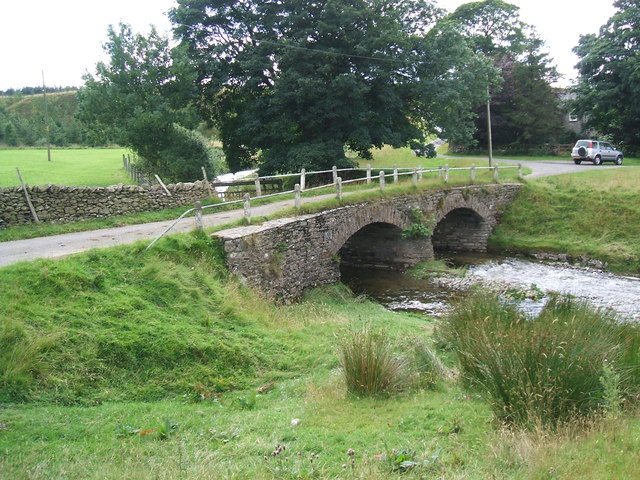
- Bowderdale Bridge

- Location in former Eden District, Cumbria Location within Cumbria
- OS grid reference: NY6704
- Civil parish: Ravenstonedale
- Unitary authority: Westmorland and Furness
- Ceremonial county: Cumbria
- Region: North West
- Country: England
- Sovereign state: United Kingdom
- Post town: PENRITH
- Postcode district: CA10
- Dialling code: 01539
- Police: Cumbria
- Fire: Cumbria
- Ambulance: North West
- UK Parliament: Westmorland and Lonsdale

Bowderdale is a hamlet in Cumbria, England, 6 miles (10 km) southwest of Kirkby Stephen. It is also the name of a dale in the Howgill Fells, the valley of Bowderdale Beck which rises on the western slopes of Yarlside and flows 5 miles (8 km) north to join the River Lune below the village of Bowderdale. For most of its length the beck forms the boundary between the parishes of Ravenstonedale and Orton.

The name, first recorded in 1224 as Butheresdal, is from the Old Norse búthar 'of the booths or shelters' and á 'river', so means "valley of the river of booths or shelters".
