= Listed buildings in Waitby =

Waitby is a civil parish in Westmorland and Furness, Cumbria, England. It contains nine listed buildings that are recorded in the National Heritage List for England. Of these, one is listed at Grade II*, the middle of the three grades, and the others are at Grade II, the lowest grade. The parish contains the villages of Waitby and Smardale and is otherwise rural. The listed buildings consist of houses and associated structures, farmhouses and farm buildings, and a bridge, a boundary stone, and a former school.

== Key ==
Grade	Criteria
II*	Particularly important buildings of more than special interest
II	Buildings of national importance and special interest

== Buildings ==
Name and location	Photograph	Date	Notes	Grade
Smardale Hall and adjoining buildings 54.46762°N 2.40388°W		c. 1580	The hall is in stone with slate roofs, two storeys and six bays. At each end is a pair of round towers with conical roofs and ball finials. The windows are mullioned and transomed with stuccoed surrounds. The range of attached farm buildings originally formed the south range of the courtyard, the hay loft being the great hall.	II*
Barn, Waitby Farm; 54.46892°N 2.38442°W	—	1690	Originally a farmhouse, later expanded and converted into a barn. It is in stone and has a stone-flagged roof. There are two storeys, originally five bays, later extended to the west and an outshut added. Most of the windows are mullioned with chamfered surrounds and a continuous hood mould. One window has a round head and an initialled datestone above.	II
Wharton House and barn 54.46974°N 2.38432°W	—	1714	The house and barn are in stone. The house has a roof of reproduction slate, two storeys, two bays, and a lower bay to the right at the same height as the barn. Above the door is an initialled and dated lintel, and the windows are replacement sashes. The barn dates from the late 18th to the early 19th century, and has a slate roof with stone coping, eight bays, and a central wagon door with a segmental head.	II
Smardale Bridge; 54.44822°N 2.43221°W		18th century (probable)	Originally a packhorse bridge, it crosses Scandal Beck. The bridge is in stone, and consists of a single segmental arch with a span of about 30 feet (9.1 m) and it has a roadway about 6 feet (1.8 m) wide. There are parapets about 3 feet (0.91 m) high with flat copings.	II
Waitby Farmhouse; 54.46905°N 2.38378°W	—	18th century (probable)	A rendered farmhouse with a slate roof, two storeys, a double depth plan, and a front of five irregular bays. The windows are sashes, and at the rear are the remains of a four-light mullioned and transomed stair window.	II
The Leases Farmhouse and attached buildings 54.48314°N 2.39613°W	—	Late 18th century	The farmhouse, barn and stables are in stone with quoins, and a slate roof with stone copings. The house has two storeys, three bays, an outshut to the west, and it contains sash windows. In the other buildings there are doors, a large wagon entrance, and external steps leading to a hay loft.	II
Byre range, The Leases Farm; 54.48301°N 2.39640°W	—	1846	The building is in stone and has a slate roof with stone-flagged eaves. It contains an earth toilet, a pig sty, and a four-stall byre, and there are wagon doors to the east.	II
Boundary stone 54.48323°N 2.39710°W	—	Mid 19th century	The stone marks the boundary between the former parishes of Crosby Garrett and Smardale. It has a semicircular head and chamfered edges, and on the sides are inscribed the names of the parishes.	II
Waitby and Smardale School; 54.46618°N 2.39011°W	—	1867	The former school is in stone with a rendered front, quoins, and a slate roof. It has a T-shaped plan with a projecting gabled porch. The windows are sashes, and on the left gable is a bellcote. In the porch gable is an inscribed tablet. (Note: Street View in May 2009 shows that the school has been extended to the right, and converted for residential use.)	II

== Notes and references ==
=== Sources ===
- Historic England, "Smardale Hall and adjoining buildings, Waitby (1326959)", National Heritage List for England
- Historic England, "Barn to south-west of Waitby Farmhouse, Waitby (1326958)", National Heritage List for England
- Historic England, "Wharton House and attached barn, Waitby (1145015)", National Heritage List for England
- Historic England, "Smardale Bridge over Scandal Beck to south of Smardalegill Viaduct, Waitby (1312391)", National Heritage List for England
- Historic England, "Waitby Farmhouse, Waitby (1137168)", National Heritage List for England
- Historic England, "The Leases, farmhouse and attached buildings, Waitby (1137185)", National Heritage List for England
- Historic England, "Byre range to south of Leases Farmhouse, Waitby (1145016)", National Heritage List for England
- Historic England, "Boundary stone south-west of Leases farmhouse, Waitby (1312431)", National Heritage List for England
- Historic England, "Waitby and Smardale School, Waitby (1268155)", National Heritage List for England
- Historic England, Listed Buildings
- Hyde, Matthew; Pevsner, Nikolaus (2010) [1967], Cumbria, The Buildings of England, New Haven and London: Yale University Press, ISBN 978-0-300-12663-1
