= St Andrew's Church, Crosby Garrett =

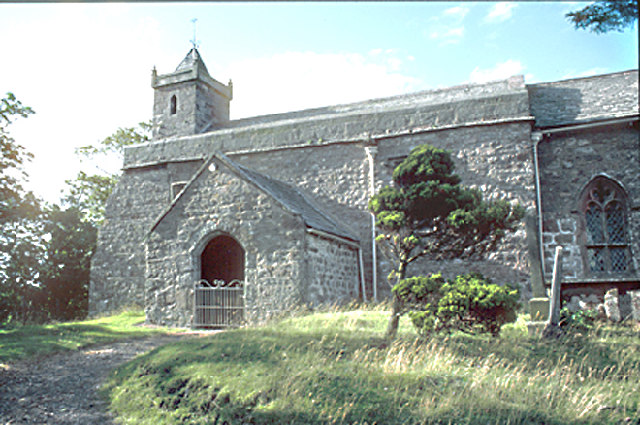
- St Andrew's Church, Crosby Garrett, from the south

- Location in Cumbria
- 54.4821°N 2.4183°W
- OS grid reference: NY 730 097
- Location: Crosby Garrett, Cumbria
- Country: England
- Denomination: Anglican
- Website: St Andrew, Crosby Garrett

History
- Status: Parish church
- Dedication: Saint Andrew

Architecture
- Functional status: Active
- Heritage designation: Grade I
- Designated: 21 October 1983
- Architect: E. Johnson (rebuilding of aisle)
- Architectural type: Church
- Style: Saxon (?), Norman, Gothic, Romanesque Revival

Specifications
- Materials: Stone, slate roofs

Administration
- Diocese: Carlisle
- Archdeaconry: Carlisle
- Deanery: Appleby
- Parish: Kirkby Stephen with Mallerstang and Crosby Garrett with Soulby

Clergy
- Vicar: Vacant from 2020

St Andrew's Church is in the village of Crosby Garrett, Cumbria, England. It is an active Anglican parish church in the deanery of Appleby, the archdeaconry of Carlisle, and the diocese of Carlisle. Its benefice is united with those of Kirkby Stephen Parish Church and St Mary, Mallerstang. The church is recorded in the National Heritage List for England as a designated Grade I listed building.

== History ==
St Andrew's originated in the 11th century, with later alterations. The chancel was rebuilt and enlarged in the 14th century. The south porch is dated 1662, and the north vestry was added in 1745. The north aisle was rebuilt in 1866 by E. Johnson of Liverpool in Romanesque style. The west tower, dating from the 13th century, was rebuilt in 1874, followed by the east window in 1883.

== Architecture ==
=== Exterior ===
The church is constructed in stone with slate roofs. Its plan consists of a three-bay nave, a two-bay chancel, a north aisle under a separate roof, and a north vestry. The tower is corbelled out from the west end of the church; it has a plain parapet, corner pinnacles, and a pyramidal roof. Along the north wall of the aisle are three round-headed windows. The chancel windows have pointed arches, and the two windows on the south of the nave are square-headed. There is a priest's door in the south wall of the chancel. There are stone benches inside the porch.

=== Interior ===
Inside the church is a three-bay Norman arcade dating from about 1175. The chancel is in Decorated style, with an Early English chancel arch. To the east of the chancel arch is the top of a higher, narrower arch with a semicircular head and voussoirs, which is considered to date from before the Norman conquest, and therefore Saxon in style. There is a large squint between the aisle and the chancel. In the south wall of the chancel is a 13th-century trefoil-headed piscina, and in the north wall is a medieval aumbry. In the tower are two bells, one dating from the 13th, and the other from the 14th century.

== Parish ==
The church is in a joint parish with:

- St Stephen's Church, Kirkby Stephen
- St Mary's Church, Mallerstang

== See also ==
- Grade I listed churches in Cumbria
- Grade I listed buildings in Cumbria
- Listed buildings in Crosby Garrett
