= Crosby Garrett =

Hamlet and civil parish in Cumbria, England

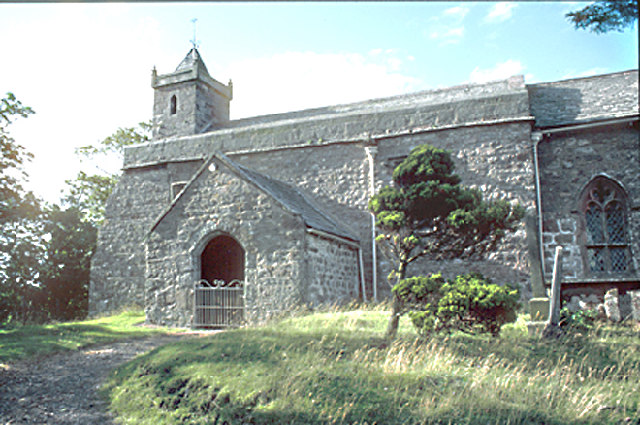
- St. Andrew's Church

- Location within Cumbria
- Population: 195
- OS grid reference: NY7209
- Civil parish: Crosby Garrett
- Unitary authority: Westmorland and Furness
- Ceremonial county: Cumbria
- Region: North West
- Country: England
- Sovereign state: United Kingdom
- Post town: KIRKBY STEPHEN
- Postcode district: CA17
- Dialling code: 01768
- Police: Cumbria
- Fire: Cumbria
- Ambulance: North West
- UK Parliament: Westmorland and Lonsdale

Crosby Garrett is a hamlet and civil parish in Westmorland and Furness Unitary Authority of Cumbria, England. It was formerly in the county of Westmorland. In the 2011 census Crosby Garrett was grouped with Waitby to give a total of 195.

The place-name 'Crosby Garrett' is first attested in a document of 1200, where it appears as Crosseby, and in another of 1206, where it appears as Crossebi Gerard. The first name is Old Scandinavian Krossa-byr, meaning 'village or homestead with crosses'. 'Garrett' is the French personal name 'Gerard', which is ultimately of Germanic origin.

In May 2010 the Crosby Garrett Helmet, a copper alloy parade helmet dating to Roman Britain, was discovered near the hamlet by a father and son using a metal detector. The helmet was sold to a private buyer at Christie's later that year for £2.3 million.

== Description ==
The parish contains no settlements of any size other than the village of Crosby Garrett, and much of the parish is on Crosby Garrett Fell to the south-west of the village.

The Settle to Carlisle railway passes through the parish, at the southwestern edge of the village on the 110 yd (100 m) Crosby Garrett viaduct; the village once had a railway station, Crosby Garrett station, which closed in 1952.

The parish church of St. Andrew has an Anglo-Saxon chancel, the remainder of the church dates between the 12th and 15th centuries. In 2010, a major restoration project was undertaken.

The highest point in the parish is Nettle Hill at 382 m (1,253 ft). 54.4642°N 2.4384°W

== Crosby Garrett Helmet ==
In May 2010 a rare ceremonial Roman helmet was discovered by an unnamed metal detectorist not far from a Roman road near the hamlet. The copper-alloy helmet with integral mask, with the appearance of a youthful male face, and a griffin crest, is only one of three recorded finds of its kind in Britain.

== See also ==
- Listed buildings in Crosby Garrett
- Smardale within the civil parish of Waitby which forms the eastern boundary of the parish.
