= Ravenstonedale Priory =

Monastery in Cumbria, England

Coordinates: 54.43312°N 2.429481°W

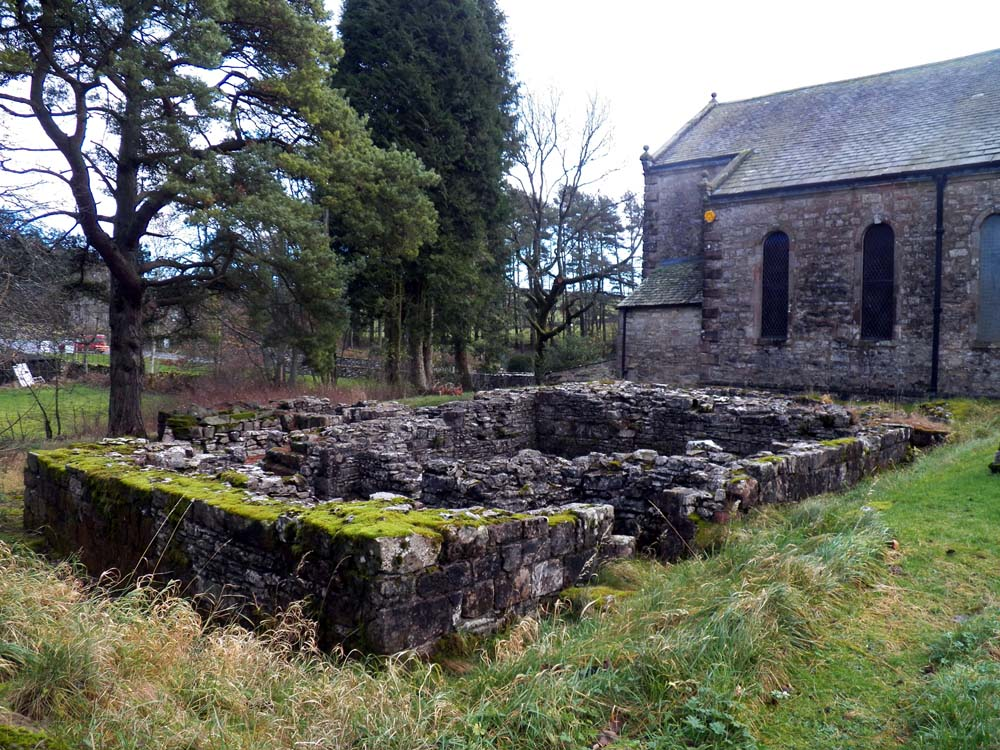
- Priory ruins adjacent to St Oswald's church
- Interactive map of Ravenstonedale Priory

Monastery information
- Full name: Ravenstonedale Priory
- Order: Gilbertine
- Established: exact date not known, during reign Henry II, 1145-1189
- Disestablished: prob 1539 with Watton
- Mother house: Watton Priory
- Diocese: Carlisle

People
- Founders: Torphin, son of Robert, son of Copsus

Site
- Location: Ravenstonedale, Cumbria, England
- Visible remains: Ruin on north side of the church. This was the east range of the cloister
- Public access: Yes

Ravenstonedale Priory was a Gilbertine priory in Cumbria, England. It was founded in the reign of Henry II, when Torphin, son of Robert, son of Copsus, assigned the manor and advowson of Ravenstonedale to Watton Priory in Yorkshire. It was supposed to house a master and three canons.

== The Gilbertine Community ==
There are few historical references to the life of the community. We do know there was a dispute over lands with Bishop Robert Chause of Carlisle (1258–78) which confirms the Priory was still in the possession of Watton in the late 13th century, and in 1336 the appropriation of Ravenstonedale church by the Priory confirms Watton's possession at that later date. Also, in 1405 an enquiry was held into the maintenance of the house, when it was claimed that for some time the canons had not been in residence.

== Post-dissolution ==
At the dissolution of Watton priory in 1539, Ravenstonedale priory passed to the archbishop of York, and then to the Wharton family. Following the sequestration of the Wharton estate in 1729, the lands were bought by the Lowther family. The ruins were first written about in 1677 by George Fothergill, and shortly afterwards by Machell in 1681, who described the cloister court. The ruins were then not substantial and by the time that Bishop Nicholson wrote about them in 1703, they had largely disappeared. Nicholson noted that a vault was visible which had been used as a prison for those on capital offences at the manorial court.

== Excavations ==
The priory ruins were excavated by E P Frankland in 1928–29, who recognised it as being the Gilbertine cell. The size of the layout appeared large in comparison to the conjectured size of the Gilbertine community in its later years. This excavation uncovered both the present visible ruins, and a range of foundations to the north of these, which are now re-covered.

In 1988-89 an extensive excavation was undertaken by Cumbria County Council on behalf of Ravenstonedale Parochial Church Council, using funds raised locally and a grant from English Heritage. Following this, consolidation work was undertaken, and the present visible ruins are the east range of the cloister probably dating from a re-modelling of existing buildings in the late 13th to 14th centuries.

There is an interpretation plaque on the site.
