= Listed buildings in Crosby Garrett =

Crosby Garrett is a civil parish in Westmorland and Furness, Cumbria, England. It contains 13 buildings that are recorded in the National Heritage List for England. Of these, one is listed at Grade I, the highest of the three grades, two are at Grade II*, the middle grade, and the others are at Grade II, the lowest grade. The parish contains the village of Crosby Garrett and the surrounding countryside. The listed buildings consists of a church, houses and associated structures, farmhouses, farm buildings, two railway viaducts, a pair of limekilns, and a boundary stone.

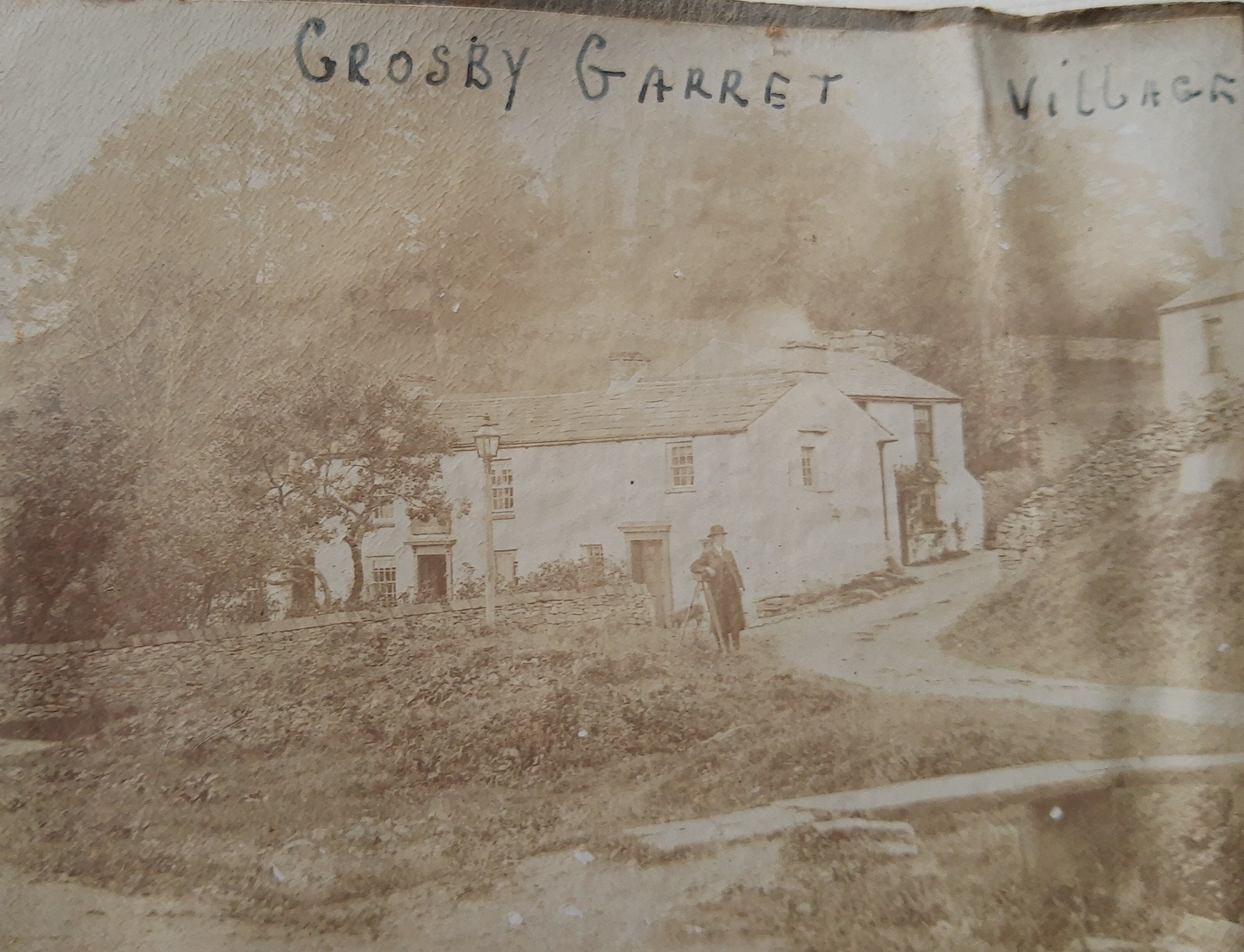
circa 1900-1910

== Key ==
Grade	Criteria
I	Buildings of exceptional interest, sometimes considered to be internationally important
II*	Particularly important buildings of more than special interest
II	Buildings of national importance and special interest

== Buildings ==
Name and location	Photograph	Date	Notes	Grade
St Andrew's Church; 54.48209°N 2.41826°W		11th century	The oldest part of the church is a portion of the chancel arch, the north arcade dates from about 1175, the tower from the 13th century (it was rebuilt in 1874) and much of the church is from the 14th century. The north aisle was rebuilt in 1866, The church is built in stone on a plinth, and has buttresses of various types, and slate roofs with stone copings. The west bell-tower is corbelled out, and has a parapet, corner pinnacles, and a pyramidal roof. The north arcade is Norman in style, and in the north aisle is a large squint.	I
Old Rectory; 54.48135°N 2.41846°W		1637	The house was extended in 1719. It is in stone, and has 2 1/2 storeys and six bays. The doorway has a chamfered surround and a cornice, and the windows are sashes. Inside the house is an inglenook and in the roof are four upper cruck pairs.	II*
Croft Farmhouse and byre 54.47929°N 2.42105°W		1691	The house and byre are in stone with a slate roof. The house has two storeys, three bays, a rear outshut, a central doorway, and sash windows. The byre to the left has a doorway with a chamfered lintel, above which is an initialled datestone and a sash window. To the left external steps lead up to a loft door with a segmental head.	II
Mains Farm Barn; 54.48213°N 2.42078°W		Before 1714	Originally a house, later used for other purposes, it is in stone with quoins, and has a slate roof with stone copings. There are two storeys and three bays, with a lean-to and a circular stair projection at the rear. In the front is a later two-storey gabled porch that has a doorway with chamfered jambs and an initialled and dated lintel.	II
Rookery Farmhouse; 54.47882°N 2.42152°W	—	1722	A stone house with a pilaster at the right end, and a slate roof with stone copings. There are two storeys and five bays. The central doorway has a stone surround and an initialled and dated lintel, and the windows are sashes.	II
Crosby Mill Cottage; 54.48345°N 2.39867°W	—	Early 18th century	A house in stone with a Westmorland slate roof. It has one storey with a loft, two bays, and an outshut. Some of the windows are mullioned.	II
Mossgill House and barn 54.48016°N 2.41954°W	—	1747	The house is stuccoed on a plinth, and has chamfered quoins, moulded eaves, and a slate roof with stone copings. There are two storeys and a symmetrical front of five bays. The central doorway has a stone surround, a rectangular fanlight, and a cornice, and the windows are sashes in stone surrounds. The barn is recessed to the left, it is in stone, and has a slate roof.	II
Barn, Old Rectory; 54.48149°N 2.41805°W		18th century	The barn is in stone on a plinth, with quoins, in an L-shaped plan, and has a slate roof, hipped at the corners, and with stone copings. There are two storeys, and it contains openings with chamfered surrounds and segmental heads, and ventilation slits.	II
Stables, wall and gate piers, Old Rectory; 54.48153°N 2.41833°W		18th century	The stables are in stone on a plinth, with quoins and a slate roof with stone copings. They have two storeys, and contain doors with segmental heads, external steps leading to a loft door, and dove holes. The wall is in cobbles with slatestone bonding. The gate piers are monolithic, with chamfered plinths, moulded imposts and ball finials, and the gates are in wrought iron.	II
Boundary stone 54.48325°N 2.39714°W	—	Mid 19th century	The parish boundary stone has a semicircular head and chamfered edges. It is inscribed on the east side with "CROSBY GARRETT" and on the west side with "SMARDALE".	II
Smardalegill Viaduct; 54.45659°N 2.42312°W		1860	The viaduct was built for the South Durham and Lancashire Union Railway, whose engineer was Thomas Bouch, to carry the railway over Scandel Beck, and it is now disused. The viaduct is in sandstone and consists of 14 semicircular arches, each with a span of about 30 feet (9.1 m). Its maximum height is 90 feet (27 m) and it is about 550 feet (170 m) long, the width of the track bed being about 25 feet (7.6 m). The viaduct is carried on tapering piers, there are pilasters on the abutments, and the cornice carries the parapet, which is about 2 feet (0.61 m) high.	II*
Limekilns; 54.45361°N 2.42677°W		c. 1860	The two limekilns were built for work on the Smardalegill Viaduct, and are constructed in limestone with quoins. They are about 30 feet (9.1 m) high, and are tapering with double hearths. The limekilns have semicircular openings about 7 feet (2.1 m) above ground level.	II
Crosby Garrett Viaduct; 54.47808°N 2.42273°W		1875	The viaduct was built by the Midland Railway on the Settle to Carlisle Line. It is in limestone with brick soffits and repairs. The viaduct consists of six skew arches with tapering piers that have imposts. It has a solid parapet, and paired pilasters at the ends. The viaduct is 110 yards (100 m) long and 55 feet (17 m) high.	II
