= Listed buildings in Ravenstonedale =

Ravenstonedale is a civil parish in Westmorland and Furness, Cumbria, England. It contains 60 listed buildings that are recorded in the National Heritage List for England. Of these, one is listed at Grade I, the highest of the three grades, two are at Grade II*, the middle grade, and the others are at Grade II, the lowest grade. The parish contains the villages of Ravenstonedale and Newbiggin-on-Lune and is otherwise rural. Most of the listed buildings are houses and associated structures, farmhouses and farm buildings. The other listed buildings include a church and items in the churchyard, chapels and associated structures, a public house, bridges, and milestones.

== Key ==
Grade	Criteria
I	Buildings of exceptional interest, sometimes considered to be internationally important
II*	Particularly important buildings of more than special interest
II	Buildings of national importance and special interest

== Buildings ==
Name and location	Photograph	Date	Notes	Grade
Cross shaft, base, and sundial 54.43282°N 2.42969°W	—	Before 1066	The structure is in the churchyard of St Oswald's Church. The earliest parts are the base and the cross-shaft, both in stone, the brass sundial plate being added in 1700. The base is square with a plinth set diagonally, and having a socket for the stump of the cross-shaft, which is about 3 feet (0.91 m) high. The sundial plate is inscribed with initials and the date.	II
Bowber Head (West house); 54.42343°N 2.40101°W	—	16th century (probable)	The house was extended and altered in the 18th century. It is in stone with quoins and has a slate roof. The original part has 2 1/2 storeys, a symmetrical front of three bays, a rear outshut, and some of the windows are sashes, and others are blocked. The extension has two storeys, a single bay, and fixed windows.	II
Town Head Cottage, former Dame School and wall 54.42762°N 2.43040°W	—	16th century (probable)	The dame school was probably converted from an outbuilding attached to the cottage in 1859. The whole building is in rendered stone, the cottage has a stone-flagged roof, and the dame school has quoins and a slate roof. They have two storeys, the cottage has four bays and the school has two. There is a door in each floor of the school, with external steps leading to the upper door. The windows in both parts are casements, and in front of the cottage is a stone wall about 3 feet (0.91 m) in height.	II
Brig Cottage and byre 54.37732°N 2.43524°W	—	1639 or earlier	The farmhouse, to which an upper floor and byre were added in the 18th century, are in stone with quoins and two storeys. The house has a slate roof with stone-flagged eaves, four bays, and a rear stair outshut. On the front is a gabled porch, the windows in the ground floor are mullioned with casements, and in the upper floor they are sashes. The byre to the south has a stone-flagged roof, two bays, casement windows, and doors.	II
Wraygreen Farmhouse and barn 54.37434°N 2.43406°W	—	1644 or earlier	The farmhouse and barn, which was added later, are in stone, partly rendered, and have a slate roof with stone-flagged eaves and stone copings at the south end. The house has two storeys, four bays, and a rear wing, and most of the windows are sashes. The barn has two bays, a door in an architrave at the rear, and on the north side are first floor doors approached by a ramp.	II
Barn and byres, Brig Cottage; 54.37740°N 2.43510°W	—	17th century (probable)	The barn with byres below is in stone with quoins and has a slate roof. There are two storeys and four bays, and there is a single-bay extension to the right.	II
Barn, Bowber Head (West house); 54.42349°N 2.40124°W	—	17th century (probable)	The barn is in stone with quoins and a slate roof. There are two low storeys, three bays, and an outshut at the rear. it contains is a blocked segmental-headed entrance with inserted doors, and two loft doors above.	II
Barn, Otterkeld; 54.42316°N 2.40033°W	—	17th century (probable)	A stone barn with quoins, a buttress, and a slate roof with stone-flagged eaves. There are two storeys and two bays. The openings include byre doors (one blocked), a loft door, and a wagon door approached by a ramp.	II
Tower House, gateway and coal store 54.44615°N 2.45522°W	—	17th century	The coal store and gateway were added in the 19th century. The buildings are in rendered stone and have slate roofs with stone-flagged eaves. The house has two storeys, four bays, and a crow-stepped south gable. There is a central doorway with an architrave, and most of the windows are mullioned. The coal store is in Gothic style, with two storeys and a single bay, a door, a ventilation slit, and a slit window. It is joined to the house by a gateway with a segmental arch.	II
Tarn House and stable 54.42536°N 2.38718°W	—	1664	The house is in pebbledashed stone on a chamfered plinth, with quoins, a slate roof, two storeys, five bays, and a rear wing. On the front is a 1 1/2-storey gabled porch with an architrave, a four-centred head, a dated lintel, internal benches, and an apex finial. Above the porch is a framed stone with coats of arms. Most of the windows are mullioned and have hood moulds. The stable was added in the 18th century, it is in stone and has a roof of corrugated asbestos at the front and stone flags at the rear. There are two bays, a door, a casement window and, at the rear, a cart entrance approached by a ramp. Inside the stable is a single upper cruck truss.	II*
Ramp barn, Tarn House; 54.42520°N 2.38724°W	—	1664	The stone barn has quoins, a stone-flagged roof, two storeys and five bays. It has a central doorway that has an initialled and dated lintel. There is a segment-headed wagon entrance in the ground floor, and another in the first floor approached by a ramp. The windows are casements.	II
Bowberhead Farmhouse and byres 54.42357°N 2.40080°W	—	Late 17th century (probable)	The porch and west end were added to the farmhouse in 1717, and the byre probably dates from the 17th century. They are in stone with quoins, the house has a slate roof, and the byre a stone-flagged roof. There are two storeys, the house has six bays and a rear wing with a porch. The door has a chamfered surround, and most of the windows are sashes. The byre has three bays, a casement window on the front, and two doors at the rear.	II
Crooks Beck Farmhouse, barn, garage and byres 54.42089°N 2.39868°W	—	Late 17th century (probable)	The farmhouse was extended and the outbuildings were added in the 18th century. The buildings are in pebbledashed stone with slate roofs. The house has two storeys, a symmetrical front of three bays, a central door and sash windows. At the north is a three-bay byre range with inserted garage doors, and to the south, at right angles, is a barn.	II
Scar View Cottage and garage 54.43095°N 2.42809°W	—	Late 17th century	The house was later extended to the south, and the original part was converted for other uses. It is in rendered stone with slate roofs and stone-flagged eaves to the original part. There are two storeys, the original part has four bays, and the extension has three. At the rear is an outshut and a wing containing a gallery. In the original part are inserted openings in the ground floor and casement windows above, one of which is mullioned, and the windows in the extension are sashes. (Note: Street View in July 2016 shows that the original part, which has been used as a garage, is converted for use as a gallery.)	II
Low Stennerskeugh Farmhouse and byre 54.41076°N 2.39709°W	—	Late 17th to early 18th century (possible)	The earliest part is the byre, the farmhouse dating from the mid to late 18th century; both have two storeys and each has three bays. The house is pebbledashed and has a slate roof with stone copings, sash windows, and a segmental-headed stair window at the rear. The byre is in stone and has a slate roof with stone-flagged eaves, quoins, doors, windows and a ventilation slit.	II
Ashfield Farmhouse; 54.43494°N 2.41247°W	—	1705	A stone farmhouse with quoins and a slate roof with stone copings. There are two storeys and a symmetrical three-bay front. The central porch has a lead roof, Tuscan pilasters, and a segmental-arched head. The windows are sashes, those in the ground floor having three lights. On the south return is a doorway with an architrave and a dated and initialled lintel, above which is a blocked 17th-century two-light mullioned window.	II
The Stone House; 54.43673°N 2.40912°W	—	1720	There is a byre carved into the hillside with a dated shield on the rear wall. It has a large opening about 6 feet (1.8 m) square, and consists of a chamber about 10 feet (3.0 m) deep, 20 feet (6.1 m) wide, and 8 feet (2.4 m) high.	II
High Chapel; 54.43006°N 2.42898°W		1726	The present windows were inserted in about 1868, and a rear wing was added later. The church is in rendered stone and has a slate roof, a single storey and five bays. To the left is a doorway with a segmental head. There are three full-length windows, and a shorter window over the door, all with stone surrounds, semicircular heads, imposts, and projecting keystones. On the left gable is a gabled bellcote and on the right gable is a finial.	II
The Manor House; 54.43060°N 2.42892°W	—	1730	Originally a house and a cottage, later converted into one dwelling, it is in pebbledashed stone with a slate roof. There are 2 1/2 storeys, eight bays, and a rear outshut. On the front is a metal openwork porch, garage doors in the former cottage, and most of the windows are fixed.	II
New House, coach-house and byres 54.37084°N 2.42479°W	—	Early to mid 18th century (probable)	The oldest part is the farmhouse, with the byres added later, and the coach house in 1914. The house is in stone with a slate roof, two storeys and seven bays. There is a gabled porch, and most of the windows are sashes. The byres to the north are rendered, they have a stone-flagged roof, four bays, doors and a loft door. The coach house projects at an angle, it has a single bay, steps leading up to a first floor door with a segmental head, kennels in the ground floor, and a pyramidal roof.	II
Lytheside East Farmhouse and cart shed 54.42577°N 2.39482°W	—	1736	The farmhouse and cart shed are in stone with quoins and a slate roof. The house has two storeys and a symmetrical three-bay front. There is a central doorway with a bracketed canopy. above which is a decorated initialled and dated panel, and the windows are inserted casements. The cart shed to the right is dated 1790, it has a single bay, a segmental-headed cart entrance with a dated keystone, a passageway with a semicircular head, and a sash window.	II
St Oswald's Church; 54.43301°N 2.42968°W		1738	The oldest part of the church is the tower, the rest dating from 1744 and re-using earlier fabric. It is built in stone with rusticated quoins, and a slate roof with ball finials. The church consists of a nave, north and south porches, a chancel, and a west tower. The tower has three stages, a west doorway, and an embattled parapet. Along the sides of the church are round-headed windows with projecting keystones.	I
Coldbeck Farmhouse; 54.43368°N 2.43275°W	—	18th century (probable)	The farmhouse is in stuccoed stone, and has a slate roof, two storeys and seven bays. The doorway has a gabled canopy, and the windows are sashes.	II
Garshill Farmhouse and barn 54.43384°N 2.42809°W	—	18th century (probable)	The farmhouse and attached barn are in stone with slate roofs, and have two storeys. The house has four bays, a gabled porch, and sash windows. The barn has three plank doors and a winnowing door at the front, and a cart entrance at the rear approached by a ramp.	II
High Lane Farmhouse, cottage and byres 54.44609°N 2.46458°W	—	18th century (probable)	The cottage has been incorporated into the house, which was rebuilt in 1833, and the byres were added in the mid to late 19th century. The buildings are in stone with slate roofs, the house has rusticated quoins and stone copings to the roof. There are two storeys, the house has three bays, a band between the storeys with a panel, and the lower cottage has two bays and a doorway with segmental pediment. There is a weathervane on the gable end of the byre.	II
High Stennerskeugh Farmhouse and byre 54.40910°N 2.39574°W	—	Mid 18th century	The farmhouse and byre are in stone with quoins and a slate roof. The house has two storeys, a symmetrical front of three bays, a door with a gabled slate canopy, and sash windows. The single-bay byre to the right has a ramp leading up to a loft door, and there is a byre entrance at the rear.	II
Hill House; 54.42957°N 2.42860°W	—	18th century	A cottage was added to the north of the house probably in the 19th century, and it was later combined with the house into one dwelling. The building is in stone with quoins at the north end. There are two storeys, the house has a slate roof, and the roof of the former cottage is stone-flagged. The house has two bays and a one-bay wing to the south, and the former cottage has one bay. On the front is a porch with a hipped roof, and the windows are sashes.	II
King's Head Hotel; 54.43370°N 2.43151°W		18th century	A public house that has incorporated other buildings and has possibly some earlier fabric. It is in stone, partly stuccoed, and has a slate roof with coping at the south end. There are two storeys and ten bays. On the front are three doorways with cornices, garage doors, and sash windows.	II
Barn, Low Stennerskeugh Farm; 54.41076°N 2.39731°W	—	18th century (probable)	The threshing barn is in rendered stone with quoins and a slate roof. It has two storeys and five bays. There are two doorways with canopies, a wagon door, a loft door, and a lean-to cart shed with a stone-flagged roof.	II
Lime kiln 54.43423°N 2.45598°W		18th century (probable)	The lime kiln is constructed in drystone, it has a circular plan, and is about 12 feet (3.7 m) high. A ramp leads to the top from the south, and on the southeast is a hearth opening about 5 feet (1.5 m) high.	II
Barn and byres, Lytheside East Farm; 54.42559°N 2.39485°W	—	Mid 18th century (probable)	The farm buildings were extended in the late 18th century to join the farmhouse. They are in stone with quoins, a slate roof, two storeys, and nine bays. The openings include windows, a cart entrance, dove openings, and ventilation slits. At the rear is a ramped cart entrance.	II
The Scaur; 54.43101°N 2.42824°W	—	18th century	A pebbledashed house with a slate roof. The main part has two storeys and three bays. There is a single-storey two-bay extension to the right, and another extension at the rear. The doorway is in the extension, and the windows are either fixed or sashes.	II
Smardale Bridge; 54.44822°N 2.43221°W		18th century (probable)	Originally a packhorse bridge, it crosses Scandal Beck. The bridge is in stone, and consists of a single segmental arch with a span of about 30 feet (9.1 m) and it has a roadway about 6 feet (1.8 m) wide. There are parapets about 3 feet (0.91 m) high with flat copings.	II
Stennerskeugh Bridge; 54.41065°N 2.39358°W		18th century (probable)	The bridge carries a track over Scandal Beck. It is in stone, and consists of a single semicircular arch spanning about 20 feet (6.1 m). The bridge has a roadway about 8 feet (2.4 m) wide, with parapets about 2 feet (0.61 m) high that have flat copings and splayed ends.	II
Wath Farmhouse; 54.44071°N 2.48832°W	—	18th century (probable)	The farmhouse is in rendered stone with quoins and a slate roof with stone copings at the south. There are two storeys and a symmetrical front of five bays. In the centre is a two-storey gabled porch with dove holes in the apex of the gable.	II
Lytheside West Farmhouse; 54.42605°N 2.39530°W	—	Mid to late 18th century (probable)	A stone farmhouse with quoins, and a slate roof with stone copings. There are two storeys and a symmetrical front of three bays. In the centre is a doorway, and the windows are sashes.	II
The Lane Cottage, barn and stable 54.43210°N 2.47274°W	—	1767	A farmhouse that was extended in 1870, 1887 and 1892 resulting in a building in cottage orné style. It is in stone on a chamfered plinth, with quoins and a slate roof that is hipped at the north end. There are two storeys, five bays, an apsidal north end, and two outshuts at the rear. On the front is a two-storey porch with a doorway in Egyptian style above which is a quatrefoil and a stepped parapet. The windows vary and include 18th-century lancets, and a mullioned and transomed window, and there are many unusual carved features.	II*
Artlegarth Beck Bridge; 54.42710°N 2.43125°W		Late 18th to early 19th century	A former packhorse bridge crossing the Artlegarth Beck, it was partly rebuilt in the late 20th century. The bridge is in stone, and consists of a single segmental arch with a skew of 16 degrees. It has split voussoirs, a solid parapet, and is angled at the south end, where there is a benchmark.	II
Pig hull, Lytheside East Farm; 54.42585°N 2.39465°W	—	Late 18th to early 19th century (probable)	The building is in stone with quoins and a slate roof. It has 1 1/2 storeys and a single bay. There is a door on the west side, and steps leading up to a first floor loft door.	II
Town End and Ash Lea Cottages; 54.43056°N 2.42734°W	—	Late 18th to early 19th century (probable)	A pair of stone cottages with a slate roof and two storeys. Town End is also pebbledashed and has two bays; Ash Lea has four bays. Both houses have doorways with pediments and the windows are sashes. The window in the fourth bay of Ash Lea is over a passage entrance.	II
Park House, walls, railings and gate 54.43603°N 2.43466°W	—	1818	The house is in stone, the south wall is slate-hung, and it has quoins and a hipped slate roof. There are two storeys and a symmetrical three-bay front. The central doorway has a wooden doorcase with pilasters and a cornice. The windows are sashes, and at the rear is a stair window with a semicircular head. The stone area walls are about 5 feet (1.5 m) high on the sides, and at the front they are about 18 inches (460 mm) high with railings that have end posts with urn finials. The central gate has interlaced decoration.	II
Rawthey Bridge; 54.37553°N 2.44269°W		1822	The bridge carries the A683 road over the River Rawthey. It is built in sandstone and consists of a single semicircular arch with a flat deck. The bridge has voussoirs in a saw-tooth pattern, a keystone, straight parapets with sandstone coping, and curved abutments.	II
Milestone; 54.41471°N 2.40303°W	—	c. 1822	The milepost was provided for the Sedbergh Turnpike Trust. It is in stone with a square base and a rounded top, and is about 2.5 feet (0.76 m) high. The milestone is inscribed with the distances in miles to Sedbergh and to Kirkby Stephen.	II
Milestone; 54.38973°N 2.42612°W	—	c. 1822	The milepost was provided for the Sedbergh Turnpike Trust. It is in stone with a square base and a rounded top, and is about 2.5 feet (0.76 m) high. The milestone is inscribed with the distances in miles to Sedbergh and to Kirkby Stephen.	II
Milestone; 54.37765°N 2.43871°W	—	c. 1822	The milepost was provided for the Sedbergh Turnpike Trust. It is in stone with a square base and a rounded top, and is about 2.5 feet (0.76 m) high. The milestone is inscribed with the distances in miles to Sedbergh and to Kirkby Stephen.	II
Milestone; 54.42557°N 2.38764°W	—	c. 1822	The milepost was provided for the Sedbergh Turnpike Trust. It is in stone with a square base and a rounded top, and is about 2.5 feet (0.76 m) high. The milestone is inscribed with the distances in miles to Sedbergh and to Kirkby Stephen.	II
Milestone; 54.40116°N 2.41173°W	—	c. 1822	The milepost was provided for the Sedbergh Turnpike Trust. It is in stone with a square base and a rounded top, and is about 2.5 feet (0.76 m) high. The milestone is inscribed with the distances in miles to Sedbergh and to Kirkby Stephen.	II
Brownber Hall; 54.44608°N 2.45661°W	—	Early 19th century (probable)	A stone house on a chamfered plinth, with rusticated quoins and a slate roof with overhanging eaves, hipped over the wings. The house has two storeys and a symmetrical front, with a central block of three bays and recessed single-bay wings. The central porch has a cornice, a battlemented parapet, and a side door. The windows are sashes, and there is a round-headed stair window at the rear.	II
Steps and walls, Brownber Hall; 54.44594°N 2.45660°W	—	Early 19th century (probable)	In front of the garden are stone walls with balusters, piers, and copings. At the ends are serpentine walls, and in the centre are steps flanked by balusters that are about 18 inches (460 mm) high and have chamfered copings. The piers are square, those at the ends having pyramidal caps.	II
Walls and gate piers, Brownber Hall; 54.44608°N 2.45541°W	—	Early 19th century (probable)	The gate piers are at the entrance to the drive and are flanked by stone walls. The piers are square with moulded plinths, rusticated shafts, and pedimented caps. The walls have ramped and moulded copings, and chamfered plinths.	II
Wall gate piers and railings, Lytheside East Farmhouse; 54.42566°N 2.39511°W	—	Early to mid 19th century (probable)	In front of the garden are drystone walls with flat copings, the gate piers are in stone, and the railings are in wrought iron with cast iron posts. The forecourt wall is about 4 feet (1.2 m) high, the garden wall is about 2 feet (0.61 m) high, with railings on top, and the gate piers are square, about 8 feet (2.4 m) high, each with a chamfered plinth and cap, and a ball finial.	II
Walls, railings and gate, Low Stennerskeugh farmhouse 54.41073°N 2.39694°W	—	Early to mid 19th century (probable)	The walls enclose the garden at the front of the farmhouse. They are in stone, about 4 feet (1.2 m) at the sides with flat coping, and 1.5 feet (0.46 m) at the front. The railings and gate are in wrought iron, they have spearhead standards, and the gate posts have urn finials.	II
Methodist Chapel; 54.43033°N 2.42765°W		1839	The chapel is in stone with quoins and a slate roof. It has a single storey and a symmetrical front of three bays, In the centre, steps lead up to a round-headed doorway with imposts, a projecting keystone and a fanlight. This is flanked by round-headed windows, and above the door is a dated panel.	II
Wall, piers, railings and gate, High Chapel; 54.42991°N 2.42855°W	—	Mid 19th century (probable)	The low stone wall bounds the east side of the churchyard and has a chamfered top. At the ends are square ashlar piers about 7 feet (2.1 m) high and with flagged tops. The railings and the central gate are in wrought iron.	II
Wall, gate and railings, The Haven; 54.42777°N 2.43025°W	—	Mid 19th century (probable)	Along the front of the garden is a stone wall with chamfered coping. The outer parts are about 2 feet (0.61 m) high, and the middle part is lower with cast iron railings and a central gate.	II
The Manse; 54.42781°N 2.43052°W	—	Mid 19th century (probable)	A stone house with rusticated quoins and a slate roof. It has two storeys and a symmetrical three-bay front. The central doorway has a fanlight and a cornice, and the windows are sashes in stuccoed surrounds.	II
Wall, gate and railings, The Manse; 54.42748°N 2.43046°W	—	Mid to late 19th century	The stone wall along the front of the garden is about 2 feet (0.61 m) high, and has chamfered coping. The railings and gate are in cast iron and have standards with foliate terminals.	II
The Haven; 54.42755°N 2.43068°W	—	Mid to late 19th century	A stone house with rusticated quoins, and a slate roof with stone copings. It has two storeys and a symmetrical front of three bays. Above the central doorway is a rectangular fanlight, and it is flanked by semicircular bay windows. The windows in the upper floor are sashes.	II
Walls, railings, and gate, The Lane Cottage; 54.43207°N 2.47258°W	—	Late 19th century (probable)	The walls in front of the garden are about 18 inches (460 mm) high. The railings have wrought iron uprights with scrolled terminals, and between them are four tubular rails. The gates have iron twists and scrollwork decoration.	II
Bank barn, Bowberhead Farm; 54.42373°N 2.40070°W	—	1887	The barn is in stone with quoins, a slate roof, two storeys and four bays. In the front are two doors and windows, and at the rear is a first floor cart entrance.	II

== Notes and references ==
=== Sources ===
- Historic England, "Cross shaft, base, and sundial 10 yards to south of church, Ravenstonedale (1145411)", National Heritage List for England
- Historic England, "Bowber Head (West house), Ravenstonedale (1145408)", National Heritage List for England
- Historic England, "Town Head Cottage, former Dame School adjoining, and area wall, Ravenstonedale (1145375)", National Heritage List for England
- Historic England, "Brig Cottage and byre adjoining to south, Ravenstonedale (1311368)", National Heritage List for England
- Historic England, "Wraygreen farmhouse with barn adjoining to north, Ravenstonedale (1158722)", National Heritage List for England
- Historic England, "Barn and Byres adjoining north-east of Brig Cottage, Ravenstonedale (1145404)", National Heritage List for England
- Historic England, "Barn to rear of Bowber Head (West house), Ravenstonedale (1158837)", National Heritage List for England
- Historic England, "Barn at Otterkeld to south of Bowberhead farmhouse, Ravenstonedale (1326757)", National Heritage List for England
- Historic England, "Tower House, with adjoining gateway and coal store, Ravenstonedale (1145402)", National Heritage List for England
- Historic England, "Tarn House and stable adjoining west return, Ravenstonedale (1158397)", National Heritage List for England
- Historic England, "Ramp barn in farmyard to south of Tarn House, Ravenstonedale (1145397)", National Heritage List for England
- Historic England, "Bowberhead farmhouse and byres adjoining, Ravenstonedale (1158817)", National Heritage List for England
- Historic England, "Crooks Beck farmhouse with adjoining barn, garage and byres, Ravenstonedale (1145396)", National Heritage List for England
- Historic England, "Scar View Cottage and garage adjoining, Ravenstonedale (1145373)", National Heritage List for England
- Historic England, "Low Stennerskeugh Farmhouse and adjoining byre, Ravenstonedale (1311491)", National Heritage List for England
- Historic England, "Ashfield farmhouse, Ravenstonedale (1158536)", National Heritage List for England
- Historic England, "The Stone House (at NGR NY 736 047), Ravenstonedale (1326760)", National Heritage List for England
- Historic England, "High Chapel United Reformed Church, Ravenstonedale (1145371)", National Heritage List for England
- Historic England, "The Manor House, Ravenstonedale (1326782)", National Heritage List for England
- Historic England, "New House with adjoining coach-house and byres, Ravenstonedale (1145394)", National Heritage List for England
- Historic England, "Lytheside, East Farmhouse and cart shed adjoining, Ravenstonedale (1326763)", National Heritage List for England
- Historic England, "Church of St Oswald, Ravenstonedale (1311289)", National Heritage List for England
- Historic England, "Coldbeck farmhouse, Ravenstonedale (1145403)", National Heritage List for England
- Historic England, "Garshill Farmhouse and ramp barn adjoining, Ravenstonedale (1145405)", National Heritage List for England
- Historic England, "High Lane Farmhouse with adjoining cottage and byres, Ravenstonedale (1158743)", National Heritage List for England
- Historic England, "High Stennerskeugh Farmhouse and adjoining byre, Ravenstonedale (1145399)", National Heritage List for England
- Historic England, "Hill House, Ravenstonedale (1145410)", National Heritage List for England
- Historic England, "King's Head Hotel, Ravenstonedale (1326762)", National Heritage List for England
- Historic England, "Barn in farmyard to west of Low Stennerskeugh farmhouse, Ravenstonedale (1311472)", National Heritage List for England
- Historic England, "Lime Kiln 250 yards to south-west of Beckstones farmhouse (at NGR 705 044), Ravenstonedale (1158612)", National Heritage List for England
- Historic England, "Ramp barn and byres adjacent to Lytheside East Farmhouse, Ravenstonedale (1158792)", National Heritage List for England
- Historic England, "The Scaur, linked to rear of Scar View Cottage, Ravenstonedale (1326783)", National Heritage List for England
- Historic England, "Smardale bridge over Scandal Beck to south of Smardalegill Viaduct (at NGR NY 721 059), Ravenstonedale (1145395)", National Heritage List for England
- Historic England, "Stennerskeugh bridge (at NGR NY 746 018), Ravenstonedale (1145398)", National Heritage List for England
- Historic England, "Wath Farmhouse, Ravenstonedale (1158502)", National Heritage List for England
- Historic England, "Lytheside West Farmhouse, Ravenstonedale (1326764)", National Heritage List for England
- Historic England, "The Lane Cottage with attached barn and stable, Ravenstonedale (1326761)", National Heritage List for England
- Historic England, "Artlegarth Beck Bridge, Ravenstonedale (1455814)", National Heritage List for England
- Historic England, "Pig-hull to north-east of Lytheside East Farmhouse, Ravenstonedale (1158800)", National Heritage List for England
- Historic England, "Town End and Ash Lea Cottages, Ravenstonedale (1145409)", National Heritage List for England
- Historic England, "Park House with area walls, railings and gate, Ravenstonedale (1145400)", National Heritage List for England
- Historic England, "Rawthey Bridge, Ravenstonedale (1384113)", National Heritage List for England
- Historic England, "Milestone 180 yards south of Fat Lamb Public House (at NGR 739 022), Ravenstonedale (1158494)", National Heritage List for England
- Historic England, "Milestone 150 yards north-east of Methodist Chapel (at NGR 724 995), Ravenstonedale (1248962)", National Heritage List for England
- Historic England, "Milestone circa 250 yards to west of Brig Cottage (at NGR 716 981), Ravenstonedale (1248963)", National Heritage List for England
- Historic England, "Milestone opposite Tarn House (at NGR NY 749 034), Ravenstonedale (1326756)", National Heritage List for England
- Historic England, "Milestone 850 yards to north-east of Stud fold (at NGR 734 007), Ravenstonedale (1326759)", National Heritage List for England
- Historic England, "Brownber Hall, Ravenstonedale (1158557)", National Heritage List for England
- Historic England, "Balustraded steps and retaining walls in front of Brownber Hall, Ravenstonedale (1145401)", National Heritage List for England
- Historic England, "Walls and gatepiers at drive entrance to Brownber Hall, Ravenstonedale (1158574)", National Heritage List for England
- Historic England, "Wall, gate piers and railings to south-west of Lytheside East Farmhouse, Ravenstonedale (1145406)", National Heritage List for England
- Historic England, "Forecourt walls, railings, and gate to east of Low Stennerskeugh farmhouse, Ravenstonedale (1326758)", National Heritage List for England
- Historic England, "Methodist Chapel, Ravenstonedale (1311286)", National Heritage List for England
- Historic England, "Forecourt wall, end piers, railings, and gate to High Chapel, Ravenstonedale (1145372)", National Heritage List for England
- Historic England, "The Manse, Ravenstonedale (1326784)", National Heritage List for England
- Historic England, "Forecourt wall, gate, and railings to The Manse, Ravenstonedale (1145374)", National Heritage List for England
- Historic England, "The Haven, Ravenstonedale (1326785)", National Heritage List for England
- Historic England, "Forecourt wall, gate, and railings to The Haven, Ravenstonedale (1145376)", National Heritage List for England
- Historic England, "Forecourt walls, railings, and gate to east of The Lane Cottage, Ravenstonedale (1158668)", National Heritage List for England
- Historic England, "Bank barn 15 yards north of Bowberhead farmhouse, Ravenstonedale (1145407)", National Heritage List for England
- Historic England, Listed Buildings
- Hyde, Matthew; Pevsner, Nikolaus (2010) [1967], Cumbria, The Buildings of England, New Haven and London: Yale University Press, ISBN 978-0-300-12663-1
