= Newbiggin-on-Lune =

Village in Cumbria, England

Coordinates: 54.441°N 2.455°W

- Village
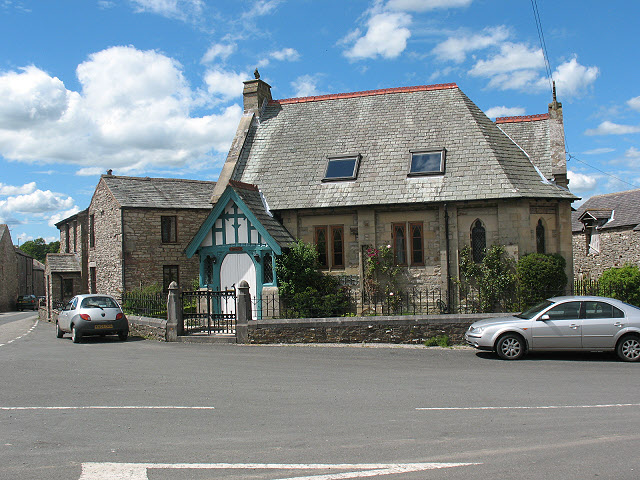
- A former chapel in Newbiggin-On-Lune

- Location in the former Eden District Location within Cumbria
- OS grid reference: NY704051
- Civil parish: Ravenstonedale
- Unitary authority: Westmorland and Furness
- Ceremonial county: Cumbria
- Region: North West
- Country: England
- Sovereign state: United Kingdom
- Post town: KIRKBY STEPHEN
- Postcode district: CA17
- Dialling code: 015396
- Police: Cumbria
- Fire: Cumbria
- Ambulance: North West
- UK Parliament: Westmorland and Lonsdale

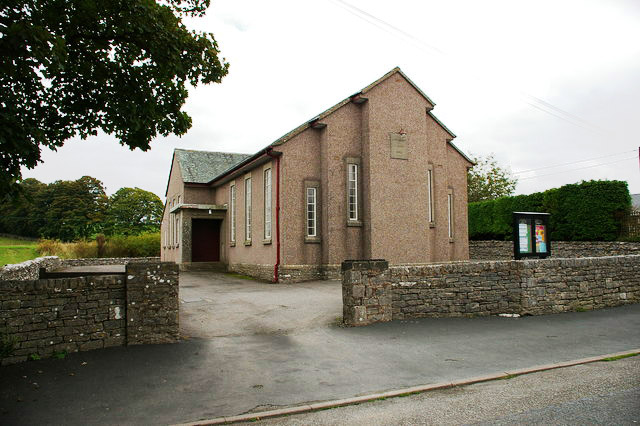
Newbiggin-on-Lune Methodist Church

Newbiggin-on-Lune is a village in Cumbria, England. Historically in Westmorland it is about 4 miles (6.4 km) south west of Kirkby Stephen, and lies on the main A685 route from Brough to Tebay. Nearby to the north is located the Smardale Gill Viaduct on the dismantled former South Durham & Lancashire Union Railway between Tebay and Kirkby Stephen East railway station. To the south lies the Howgill Fells including Green Bell 1,985 feet (605 metres).

== Governance ==
Newbiggin-on-Lune is in the parliamentary constituency of Westmorland and Lonsdale.

For purposes of local government, it is administered as part of the Westmorland and Furness unitary authority area.

Newbiggin-on-Lune does not have its own parish council; instead it is part of Ravenstonedale Parish Council.

== See also ==
- Listed buildings in Ravenstonedale
