= Brownber =

Hamlet in Cumbria, England

Coordinates: 54.44°N 02.46°W

- Location in Eden, Cumbria Location within Cumbria
- OS grid reference: NY7005
- Civil parish: Ravenstonedale
- Unitary authority: Westmorland and Furness
- Ceremonial county: Cumbria
- Region: North West
- Country: England
- Sovereign state: United Kingdom
- Post town: KIRKBY STEPHEN
- Postcode district: CA17
- Dialling code: 01539
- Police: Cumbria
- Fire: Cumbria
- Ambulance: North West
- UK Parliament: Westmorland and Lonsdale

Brownber is a hamlet near Newbiggin-on-Lune in Cumbria, England.
