= Weasdale Beck =

Stream in Cumbria, England

Coordinates: 54.4403°N 2.4881°W

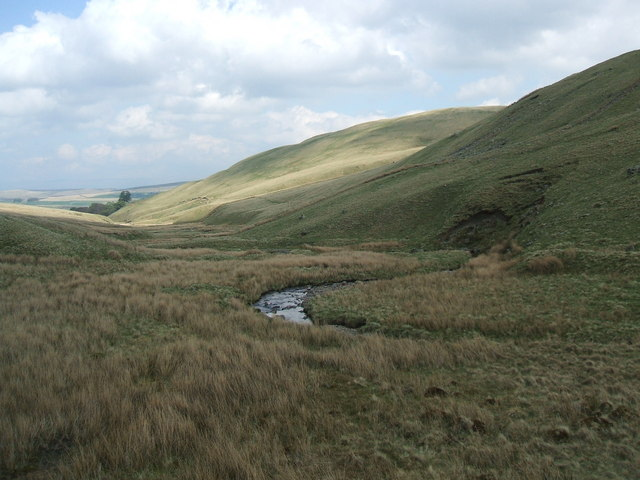

Weasdale Beck is a stream in Cumbria, England. It is in the Lune - headwaters to confluence Birk Beck catchment.

The Beck rises in Ravenstonedale and drains Leathgill Bridge on Randygill Top and Great Swindale, below Green Bell, flowing northwards to Wath, where, at its confluence with Sandwath Beck, Weasdale Beck forms the River Lune.
