= Ravenstonedale =

Village and civil parish in Cumbria, England

Coordinates: 54.43084°N 2.42728°W

- Village
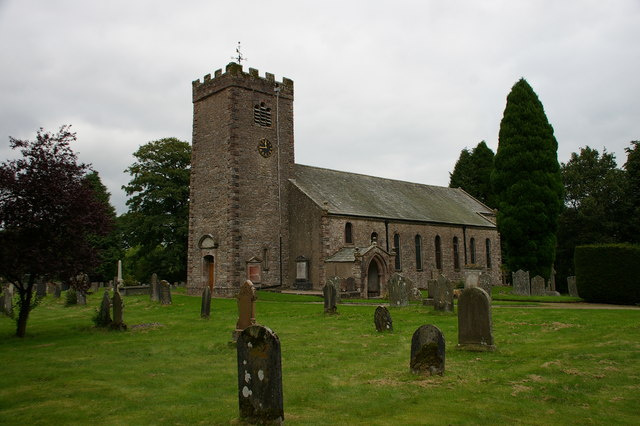
- St Oswalds Church in Ravenstonedale

- Location within Cumbria
- Population: 594 (2011)
- OS grid reference: NY723040
- Civil parish: Ravenstonedale
- Unitary authority: Westmorland and Furness
- Ceremonial county: Cumbria
- Region: North West
- Country: England
- Sovereign state: United Kingdom
- Post town: KIRKBY STEPHEN
- Postcode district: CA17
- Dialling code: 01539
- Police: Cumbria
- Fire: Cumbria
- Ambulance: North West
- UK Parliament: Westmorland and Lonsdale

Ravenstonedale is a village and large civil parish in Cumbria, on the watershed between the River Lune and River Eden. The village lies 4 miles (6 km) south west of Kirkby Stephen. The parish includes the village of Newbiggin-on-Lune and several smaller settlements including Bowderdale, Brownber, Greenside, Stennerskeugh, Wath and Weasdale. Large areas of moorland lie within the parish, extending 5 miles (8 km) south west of the village to the northern side of the Howgill Fells. The parish had a population of 570 in 2001, increasing to 594 at the 2011 Census.

Historically also known as "Russendale", the parish is divided into four parts (known as 'angles'): Town, Newbiggin-on-Lune, Bowderdale and Fell End. The origin and toponymy of the name are obscure. An alternative spelling may be Rausyngdale

The parish was historically in the county of Westmorland. Since 2016 it has been within the Yorkshire Dales National Park.

== Village ==
The village is centred on a single main street, though there are many scattered dwellings on the periphery. Slightly to the south east of the village centre are the buildings of the former Ravenstonedale Endowed School. It closed in 2015. There are two inns in the village, and one about two miles outside at Fell End.

== St Oswald's church ==
The parish church, dedicated to St Oswald, dates mainly from the rebuild in the 18th century. The tower dates from 1738, and the rest is of 1744. It has an interesting interior where rows of box pews face a central aisle in the collegiate style. There is a very good example of a three-decker pulpit. To the north of the church are the excavated remains of a Gilbertine priory built in the 12th century, which can still be viewed. There is an interpretation board

== Governance ==
An electoral ward in the same name exists. This ward stretches north to Great Strickland and has a population taken at the 2011 Census of 976.

== Transport links ==
The village is just off the A685 which runs from Junction 38 of the M6 at Tebay through Kirkby Stephen and connects with the A66 at Brough. The village was served by Ravenstonedale railway station (located to the west of Newbiggin-on-Lune), but it closed to passengers in 1952, and to goods traffic in 1962. The nearest station is Kirkby Stephen railway station which is about 4 miles away by road, and is on the main Settle-Carlisle Line. Ravenstonedale is currently the northern terminus of the Pennine Bridleway.

== Notable people ==
- Thomas Dixon, senior

== Gallery ==
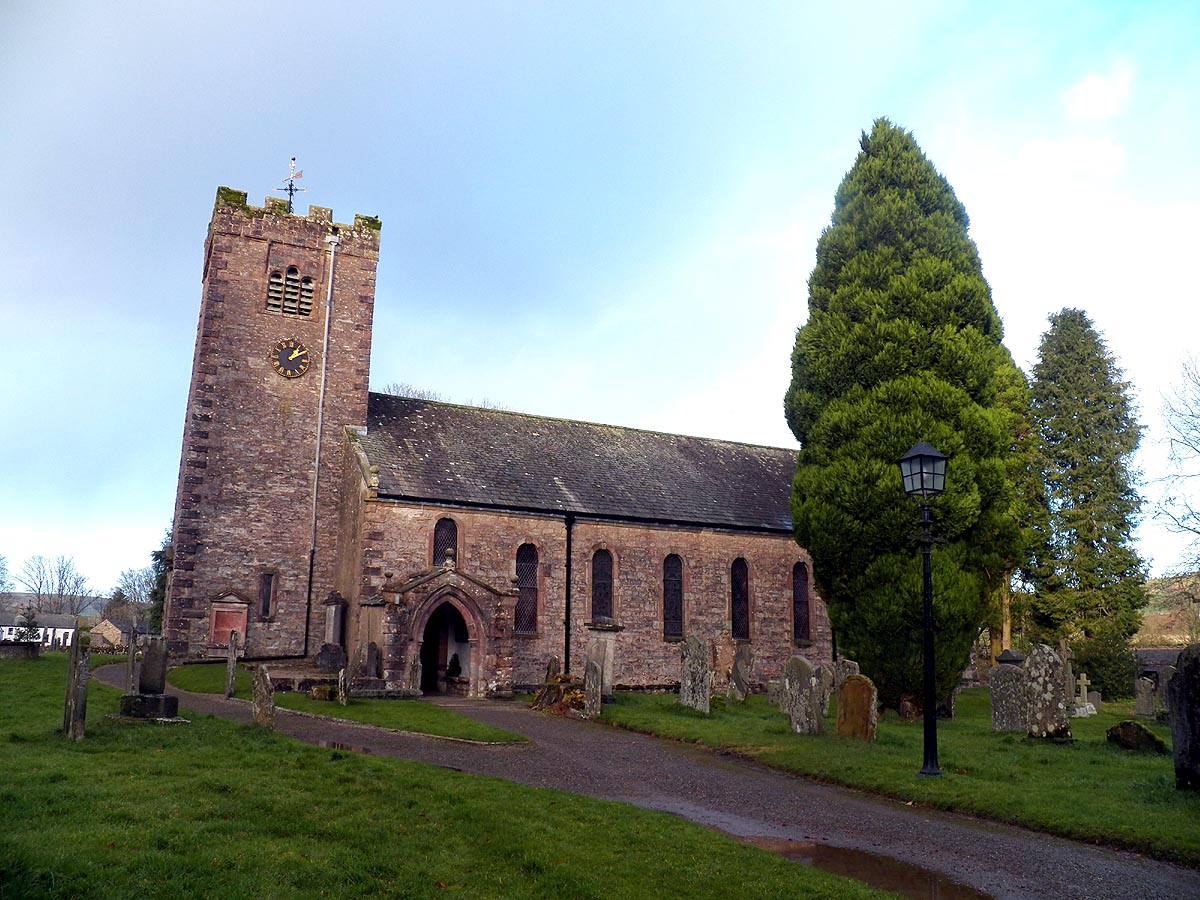
St Oswald's church

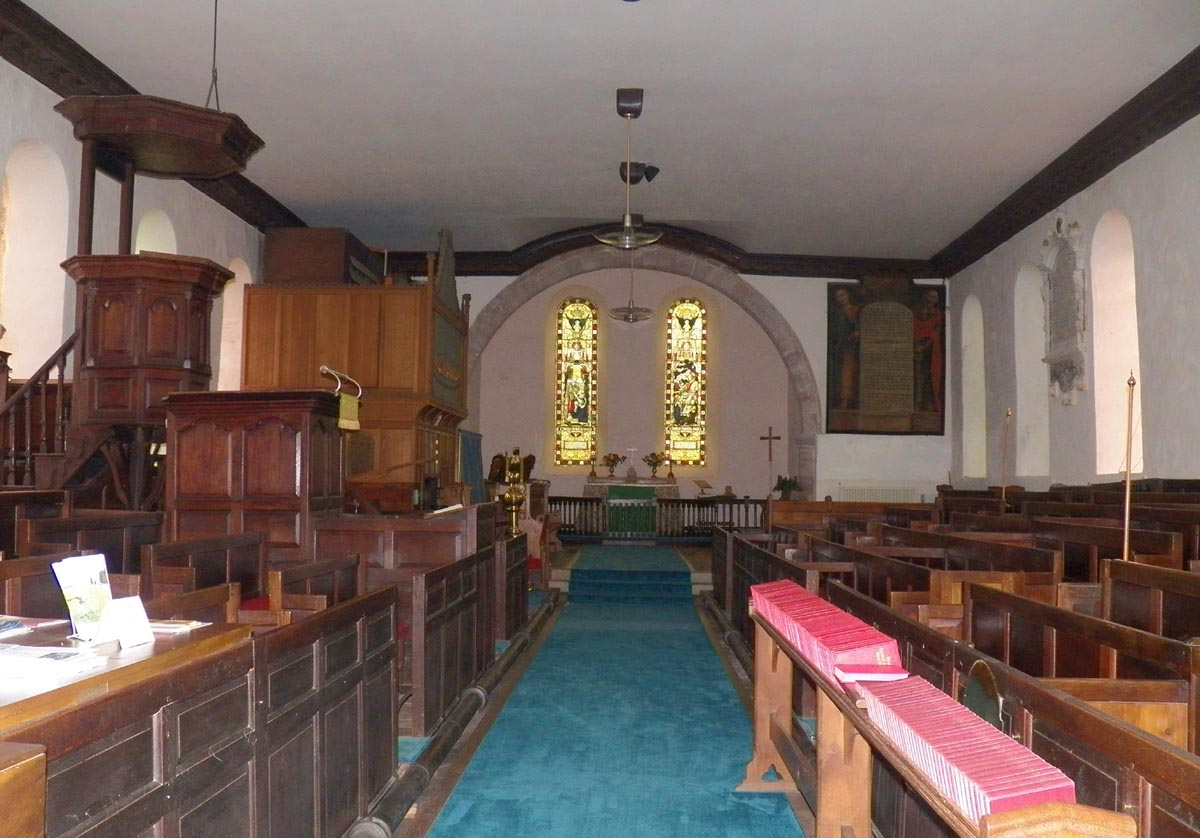
St Oswald's church interior east

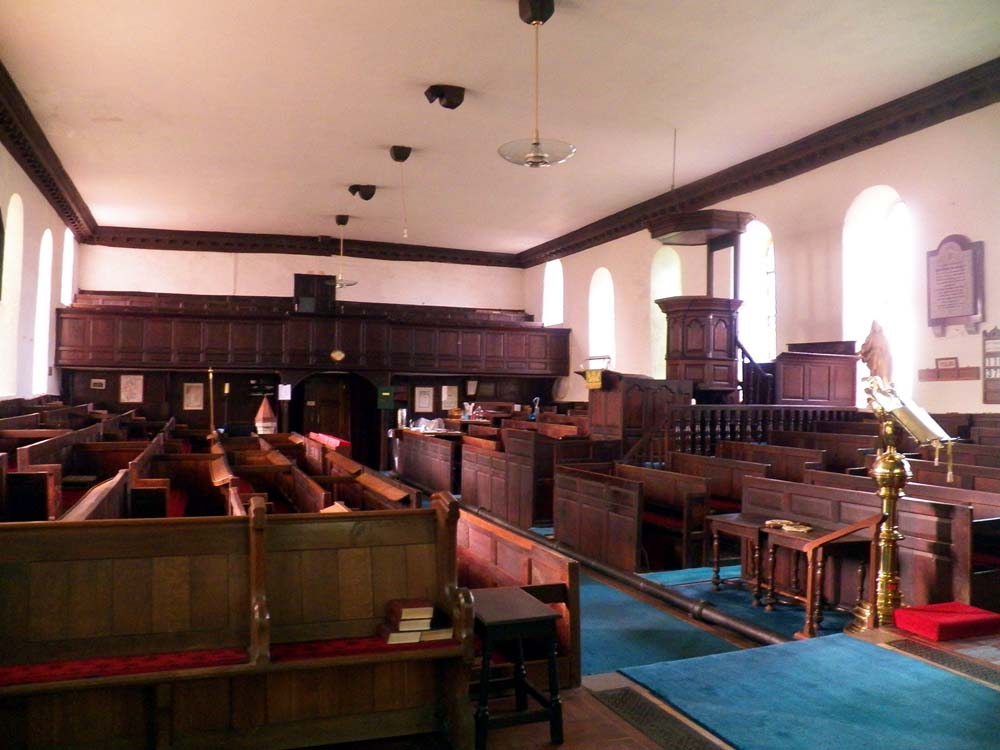
St Oswald's church interior west

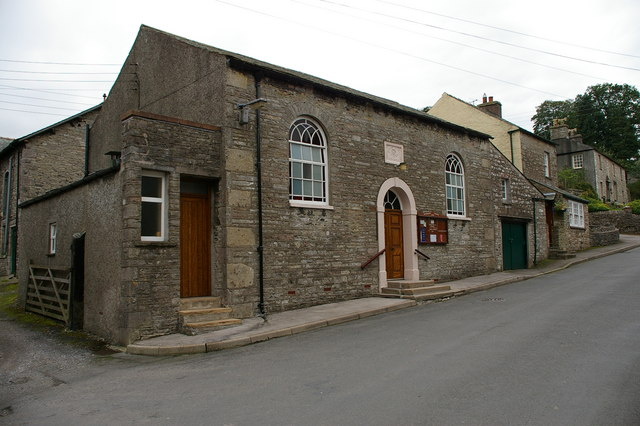
Low Chapel Methodist church

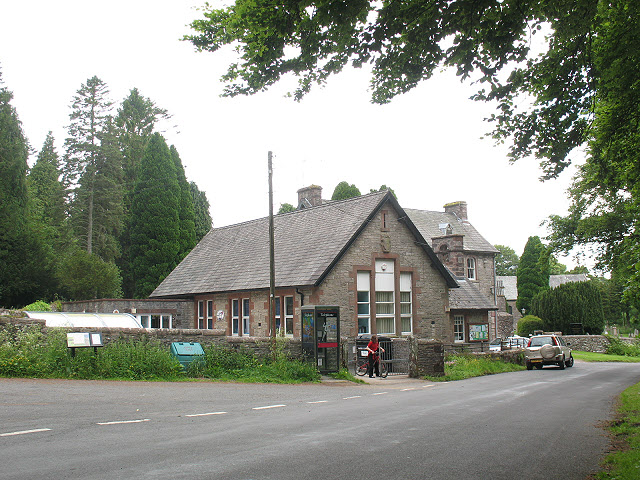
Village Endowed School

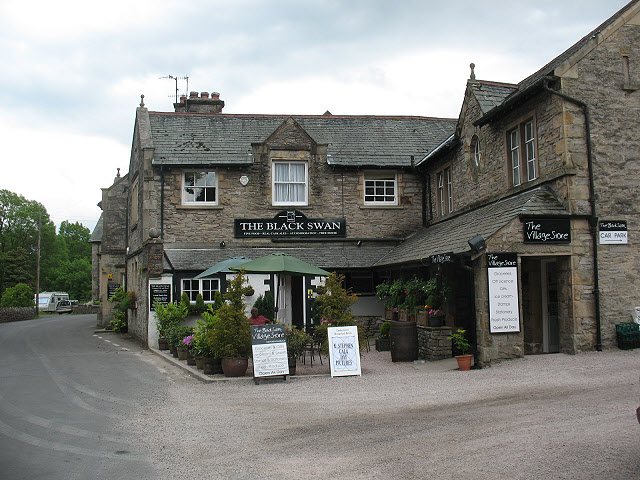
The Black Swan

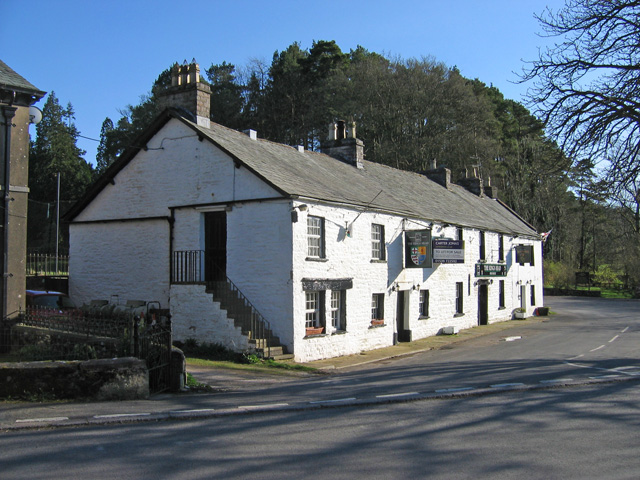
The King's Head

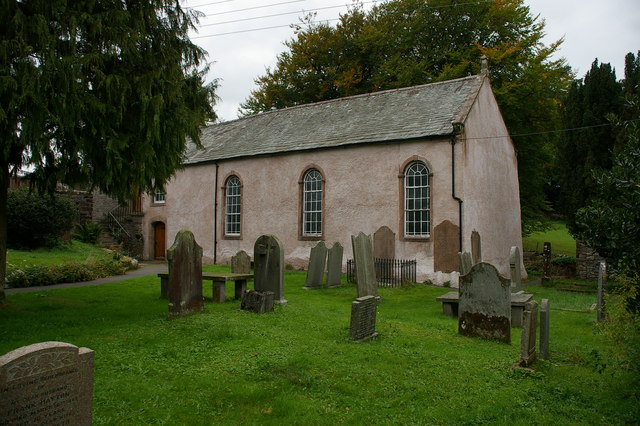
High Chapel, formerly the United Reformed Church, now the Community and Heritage Centre.

== See also ==
- Listed buildings in Ravenstonedale
