= Musgrave =

Musgrave may refer to:

== Places ==
=== Generally ===
- Musgrave Block, a geological province in South Australia and Western Australia

==== Queensland ====
- Musgrave, Queensland, a town in Queensland
  - Musgrave Telegraph Station, a former telegraph station in Queensland
- Port Musgrave, a bay on the west coast of Cape York Peninsula in Queensland
  - Electoral district of Musgrave, a former electorate

==== Northern Territory and South Australia ====
- Musgrave Ranges, a mountain range in the Northern Territory and South Australia

==== South Australia ====
- County of Musgrave, a cadastral unit

=== England ===
- Musgrave, Cumbria, civil parish in Cumbria
- Great Musgrave, village in Cumbria
- Little Musgrave, village in Cumbria
- Musgrave railway station, station to the west of Great Musgrave in Cumbria

=== Canada ===
- Musgrave Harbour, a town in the province of Newfoundland and Labrador
- Musgravetown, a town in the province of Newfoundland and Labrador
- Mount Musgrave, a mountain on the island of Newfoundland
- Musgrave Land, a peninsula in Labrador

=== New Zealand ===
- Mount Musgrave, South Island, New Zealand

=== Northern Ireland ===
- Musgrave, Belfast, ward of South Belfast

=== South Africa ===
- Musgrave, Durban, a suburb of Durban that is part of Berea

== Organizations ==
- Musgrave Group, Irish food wholesaler and retailer
- Musgrave Pencil Company, American pencil manufacturer
- Musgrave Rifles, South African rifle company
- John Musgrave & Sons, a manufacturer of stationary steam engines located in Lancashire, England

== Other uses ==
- Musgrave (surname)
- Musgrave non-dead-centre engine, a stationary steam engine
- "The Adventure of the Musgrave Ritual", an 1893 Sherlock Holmes mystery by Arthur Conan Doyle
- "Matty Groves", a folk ballad sometimes called "Little Musgrave and Lady Barnard"

== See also ==
- Musgraves (disambiguation)
- Musgrave Park (disambiguation)
- Musgrove (disambiguation)
