= Flitholme =

Hamlet in Cumbria, England

Coordinates: 54.530°N 2.369°W

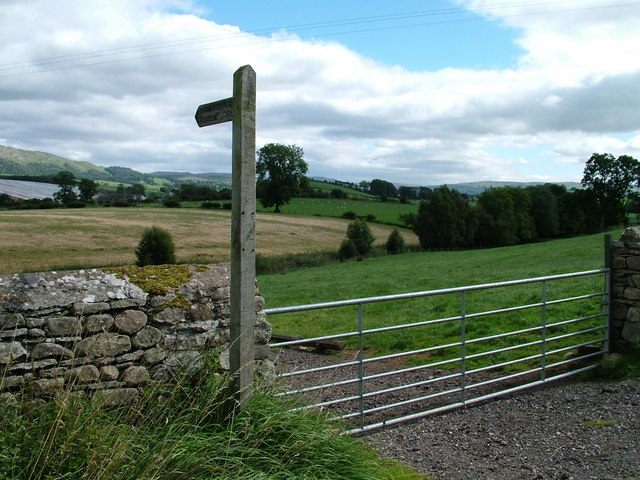
- Fields adjacent to Flitholme

- Location in Eden, Cumbria Location within Cumbria
- OS grid reference: NY761150
- Civil parish: Musgrave
- Unitary authority: Westmorland and Furness
- Ceremonial county: Cumbria
- Region: North West
- Country: England
- Sovereign state: United Kingdom
- Post town: APPLEBY-IN-WESTMORLAND
- Postcode district: CA16
- Dialling code: 017683
- Police: Cumbria
- Fire: Cumbria
- Ambulance: North West
- UK Parliament: Westmorland and Lonsdale

Flitholme is a hamlet in the parish of Musgrave, in the Westmorland and Furness district, in the English county of Cumbria.

== Location ==
It is located on an unclassified road about a quarter of a mile away from the A66 road.

== Nearby settlements ==
Nearby settlements include the town of Appleby-in-Westmorland, the villages of Warcop, Great Musgrave, Little Musgrave and Brough under Stainmore and the hamlet of Langrigg.

== Eden Valley Railway ==
The Eden Valley Railway Trust near Warcop operates a heritage railway on the 9.3 km of track from Appleby to Flitholme.
