= Musgrave (surname) =

Musgrave is a surname originating in the former county of Westmorland, now part of Cumbria in Northern England, where there are two villages called Great Musgrave and Little Musgrave. Notable people with the surname include:

- Alan Musgrave (1940–2026), English-New Zealand philosopher and academic
- Andrew Musgrave (born 1990), British cross-country skier
- Anthony Musgrave (1828–1888), British colonial administrator
- Anthony Musgrave (entomologist) (1895–1959), great-nephew of the above
- Bill Musgrave (born 1967), American football coach and former player
- Charles Musgrave, American nanotechnologist
- Christopher Musgrave (disambiguation), multiple people
- David Musgrave (born 1965), Australian poet
- Harrison Musgrave (born 1992), American baseball player
- Henry Musgrave (1827–1922), Victorian philanthropist, Northern Ireland
- Sir James Musgrave, 1st Baronet (1826–1904), Irish businessman
- Joe Musgrave (1908–1981), English footballer
- John Musgrave (born 1948), American Vietnam veteran, poet, counselor, and veterans' affairs advocate
- John Musgrave (cricketer) (1845–1885), English cricketer
- Ken Musgrave (1955–2018), professor and CEO/CTO of Pandromeda, Inc.
- Luke Musgrave (born 2000), American football player
- Mandy Musgrave (born 1986), American actress
- Marilyn Musgrave (born 1949), American politician
- Philip Musgrave (disambiguation), multiple people
- Richard Musgrave (economist) (1910–2007)
- Rosamund "Posy" Musgrave (born 1986), British former cross-country skier
- Samuel Musgrave (1732–1780), English classical scholar and physician
- Simon Musgrave, (died 1597), English landowner
- Susan Musgrave (born 1951), Canadian poet
- Story Musgrave (born 1935), NASA Astronaut
- Ted Musgrave (born 1955), NASCAR Driver
- Thea Musgrave (born 1928), Scottish-American composer
- Thomas Musgrave (disambiguation), multiple people

== See also ==
- Musgraves (disambiguation) § People with the surname Musgraves
- Musgrove (surname)
