= Musgrove (surname) =

Musgrove is a surname. Notable people with the surname include:

- Alexander J. Musgrove (1881–1952), Scottish-born Canadian artist
- Armstrong Musgrove (1854 –1940), Canadian educator and politician
- Bob Musgrove (1893–1941), English footballer
- Grant Musgrove (born 1968), Australian policy advisor
- George Musgrove (1854–1916), English-born Australian theatre producer
- George Musgrove (politician) (1865–1954), Canadian dentist and politician
- Grace Musgrove (born 1992), Australian triathlete
- Harold Musgrove (born 1931), British businessman
- Hazel Musgrove (born 1989), British water-polo player
- Harry Musgrove (1858–1931), Australian cricketer and theatrical manager
- James Musgrove (1862–1935), British medical practitioner and educator
- Joe Musgrove (born 1992), American baseball player
- John Musgrove (disambiguation), multiple people
- Sir John Musgrove, 1st Baronet (1793–1881), British businessman and Lord Mayor of London.
- L. H. Musgrove (1832-1868), outlaw of the American West
- Malcolm Musgrove (1933–2007), English football player and manager
- Mary Musgrove (c. 1700–1763), Yamacraw and English cultural mediator in colonial America
- Nick Musgrove (fl. 2010s), co-writer of Wrong Kind of Black
- Ronnie Musgrove (born 1956), American politician
- Spain Musgrove (1945–2021), American football player
- Tom Musgrove (1927–1997), Canadian politician
- Zane Musgrove (born 1996), New Zealand rugby league footballer

== See also ==
- Musgrave (surname)
