= Preserved EMUs of Southern Railway =

Preserved EMUs of Southern Railway. This is a list of preserved Southern Railway (UK) designated electric multiple units (EMUs).

== Glossary ==
For an explanation of type codes, such as DMBSO, see British Rail coach type codes.

== 2-BIL ==
Unit number (current in bold)		DMBSO	DTSso	Built	Livery	Location
**2090**	-	10656	12123	1937 Eastleigh	BR(S) Malachite Green	National Railway Museum

== 2-EPB ==
Unit number (current in bold)			DMBSO	DTSso	Built	Livery	Location
5667	**6307**	-	14573	16117	1959 Eastleigh	Red Primer	Private site at Sellinge, Kent
**5759**	6259	-	65373	77558	1956 Eastleigh	BR Green	Stored at Southall Depot
**5793**	6292	932053	65321	77112	1955 Eastleigh	Green primer / Blue grey	Battlefield Line Railway
**5703**	6203	930032/930204	65302	-	1955 Eastleigh	BR Green	MoD Bicester
**5705**	6205	930032/930205	65304	-	1955 Eastleigh	BR Green	MoD Bicester
5765	6265	930034/**930206**	65379	-	1955 Eastleigh	BR Green	MoD Bicester
5768	6268	930034/**930206**	65382	-	1955 Eastleigh	BR Green	MoD Bicester

Departmental Sandite Units 930205 and 930206 (ex-DMBSOs 65302/65304/65379/65382) relocated to MoD Bicester for storage after closure of Finmere Railway Station.

== 2-HAP ==
Unit number (current in bold)			DMBSO	DTCso	Built	Livery	Location
**4308**	-	-	61275	75395	1958 Eastleigh	Network South East	National Railway Museum
**4311**	-	-	61287	70547	1958 Eastleigh	Network South East	Private Owned - Darley Dale

== 4-CEP ==
The full list is shown below. Complete units are highlighted:

Unit Number (current in bold)				Type	Phase	DMBS	TC (+TBC)	TS (*TRSB)	DMBS	Livery	Location	Notes
7016	2305	**2315**	-	4 Bep	Phase 2	61798	70354	70229	61799	South West Trains	Eden Valley Railway	70229 was in 7105 originally
7019	2301	**2311**	-	4 Bep	Phase 2	61804	70607	70539	61805	South West Trains	Eden Valley Railway	-
**7105**	1537	2325	-	4 Bep	Phase 1	61229	70235	69345*	61230	South West Trains	1 motor coach being defurbished at Eastleigh under long-term project and 1 Motor Coach in store there. 2 trailer coaches (including buffet car) based at Epping Ongar in green primer, red oxide, filler and some SWT livery.	Unit 7105 was the first-built production unit.
**7113**	1524	-	-	4 Cep	Phase 1	-	-	70262	-	BR Green	Hastings Diesels	Operates with preserved Class 201 unit 1001.
7124	1530	**1392**	-	4 Cep	Phase 1	-	-	70273	-	BR Blue/Grey	Dartmoor Railway	Ex 4-CIG No. 1392, Now removed from unit and stored on Dartmoor Railway.
7135	**1520**	-	-	4 Cep	Phase 1	-	-	70284	-	Network SouthEast	Northamptonshire Ironstone	-
7143	1554	**1398**	-	4 Cep	Phase 1	-	-	70292	-	South West Trains	Long Marston, for sale	Operated in 4 Cig unit 1398.
7147	**1559**	-	-	4 Cep	Phase 1	-	-	70296	-	Network SouthEast	Northamptonshire Ironstone	-
7153	1500	**1547**	-	4 Cep	Phase 1	-	70345+	-	-	Network SouthEast	Sutton Bridge	Unit 7153 was the prototype refurbished unit, latterly renumbered 1500.
7159	1595	1399	-	4 Cep	Phase 2	-	-	70508	-	BR Blue/Grey	Dartmoor Railway	Ex 4-CIG No. 1399, Now removed from unit and stored on Dartmoor Railway.
7161	**1597**	-	-	4 Cep	Phase 2	-	-	70510	-	Network SouthEast	Northamptonshire Ironstone	-
7175	2304	-	**1198**	3 Cep	Phase 2	61736	70573	-	61737	BR Blue & Grey	Chinnor and Princes Risborough Railway	Unit 1198 was dedicated to the "Lymington Flyer" service.
7178	**1589**	-	-	4 Cep	Phase 2	61742	-	-	61743	61742 part NSE, part green 61743 BR Blue/Grey	Dartmoor Railway	-
**7178**	1589	-	-	4 Cep	Phase 2	-	70576+	-	-	BR Green	Snibston Discovery Park	converted to vacuum brake
7178	1589	**1393**	-	4 Cep	Phase 2	-	-	70527	-	Carmine & Cream	Whitwell & Reepham railway station	Operated with 4CIG unit 1393. Now loose
7182	1610	**1396**	-	4 Cep	Phase 2	-	-	70531	-	South West Trains	Long Marston, for sale	Operated in 4 Cig unit 1396.
7198	1569	207203		4 Cep	Phase 2	-	-	70547	-	Connex	Private site, Hungerford	Operated in Class 207 unit 207203.
7200	1567	**207202**		4 Cep	Phase 2	-	-	70549	-	Connex	East Lancashire Railway	Operates in Class 207 unit 207202.

== 4-CIG ==
The full list is shown below. Complete units are highlighted:

Unit Number (current in bold)					Type	Phase	DTCsoL	MBSO	TSO (*TSRB)	DTCsoL	Livery	Location	Notes
7032	2101	**2251**	-	-	4Big	Phase 1	-	-	69302*	-	Network SouthEast	Abbey View Disabled Centre	-
7034	2110	**2260**	-	-	4Big	Phase 1	-	-	69304*	-	Network SouthEast	Northamptonshire Ironstone Railway Trust	-
**7036**	2104	2254	2002	-	4Big	Phase 1	-	-	69306*	-	BR(S) Green	Spa Valley Railway	Used as a static cafe as Tunbridge Wells West station.
**7040**	2105	2255	2003	-	4Big	Phase 1	-	-	69310*	-	BR(S) Green	Dartmoor Railway	-
**7046**	2108	2258	-	-	4Big	Phase 1	-	-	69316*	-	BR(S) Green	Riccarton Junction	Waverley Route heritage centre.
**7048**	2109	2259	2004	-	4Big	Phase 1	-	-	69318*	-	BR(S) Green	Mid Norfolk Railway	-
7051	**2203**	-	-	-	4Big	Phase 2	-	-	69332*	-	Network SouthEast	Dartmoor Railway	-
7053	**2205**	-	-	1753	4Big	Phase 2	-	-	69339*	-	BR(S) Green	Nemesis Rail, Burton-On-Trent	This buffet car is now a part of 4Cig 1753 which is owned by the Network SouthEast Railway Society
**7055**	2207	2112	2262	2001	4Big	Phase 2	-	-	69333*	-	BR(S) Green	Lavender Line	-
7057	**2209**	-	-	-	4Big	Phase 2	-	-	69335*	-	LNER Green/Cream	Wensleydale Railway	-
**7058**	2210	-	-	-	4Big	Phase 2	-	-	69337*	-	BR Green	Hastings Diesels	Operates with preserved Class 201 unit 1001.
7327	1127	**1753**	-	-	4Cig (now 5Big)	Phase 1	76102	62043	70721	76048	Connex	Network SouthEast Railway Society	1753 is currently being overhauled to mainline standard, and to receive NSE livery at Nemesis Rail, Burton-On-Trent. Also 1753 is now known as 5Big as it now comprises Mk 1 Cig Buffet car No. 69339.
7373	-	1819	**1306**	-	4Cig	Phase 2	-	-	71041	-	Green	Hever railway station	In use as office extension by station building owners.
7376	1276	2251	1394	**1499**	4Cig	Phase 2	-	62364	-	-	South West Trains	Dean Forest Railway	76726, 71080, 76797 sold for scrap. 62364 to RVEL Derby. Conversion to UTU coach.
7397	1297	2256	**1399**	-	3Cig	Phase 2	76747	62385	70508	76818	BR Green	400Series.co.uk	76747, 62385 & 70508 at Dartmoor Railway 9/11/11. 76818 at Eastleigh Works. 76747 into BR Green 10/05/12. Last surviving SWT "Greyhound" unit. 62385 is now at the East Kent Railway (heritage) and a part of 4VOP 3905.
7414	1214	1883	**1497**	-	3Cig	Phase 2	76764	62402	-	76835	BR Blue/Grey	Spa Valley Railway	1497 is now preserved privately by the 1497 Freshwater Preservation Group and in use at the Spa Valley Railway
7417	1217	**1884**	-	-	4Cig	Phase 2	-	-	71085	-	White / Art Design	Morden Wharf, Greenwich	Now out of use, in store.
7423	1223	1888	**1498**	-	3Cig	Phase 2	76773	62411	-	76844	BR Green	Exported to Quirky Glamping Village, Enniscorne, County Sligo in Ireland	Formerly on the Lymington Branch Line. Was in use on the Epping Ongar Railway until mid 2013. Was then sold and exported soon after to Ireland to be a part of a Glamping site.

== 4-SUB ==
Unit number (current in bold)			DMBTO	TT	TTO	DMBTO	Built	Livery	Location
1243	**4308**	-	8143	-	-	-	1925 Eastleigh	SR Maunsell Green	National Railway Museum
-	**4732**	-	12795	12354	10239	12796	1951 Eastleigh	BR Blue	Locomotive Storage Ltd, Margate
-	-	-	-	10400	-	-	1951 Eastleigh	Network South East	scrapped 02/2020

== 4-TC ==
Unit Number (current in bold)				Type	Phase	DTSO	TFK	TBSK	DTSO	Livery	Location	Notes
404	8004	3169	**3582**	4TC	Phase 1	76275	-	-	-	BR Blue and Pearl Grey	Swanage Railway Trust 4TC Group	Operated in 4Vep unit 3169/3582 between 1992 and 2004. Now owned by Swanage Railway Trust 4TC Group
405	8005	-	-	4TC	Phase 1	76277	-	-	-	Serco Railtest	Dartmoor Railway	Operated as DB 977335 in departmental service.
412	8012	**"413"**	-	4TC	Phase 1	-	70855	-	-	LT Maroon	Midland Railway - Butterley	Operated by London Underground 1992–2003. Now owned by the Swanage TC Group
413	8013	**"413"**	-	4TC	Phase 1	-	-	70824	-	LT Maroon	Midland Railway - Butterley	Operated by London Underground 1992–2003. Now owned by the Swanage TC Group
415	8015	**"413"**	-	4TC	Phase 1	76298	-	-	-	LT Maroon	Midland Railway - Butterley	Operated by London Underground 1992–2003. Now owned by the Swanage TC Group
427	8027	**"413"**	-	4TC	Phase 1	-	-	-	76322	LT Maroon	Midland Railway - Butterley	Operated by London Underground 1992–2003. Now owned by the Swanage TC Group
**415**	8015	-	-	4TC	Phase 1	-	-	70826	-	BR Blue	Sandford and Banwell railway station	Formed with unit 417 until 2011, moved to Sandford and Banwell railway station
**416**	8016	8010	-	4TC	Phase 1	-	70859	-	-	BR Blue	Strathvithie railway station	-
**417**	8017	-	-	4TC	Phase 1	76301	70860	-	76302	BR Blood & Custard	Various	Unit split in 2011 with 76301 and 76302 moving to Bellingham, Northumberland. 70860 moved to Old North Road station.
**428**	8028	-	-	4TC	Phase 1	76297	71163	70823	76324	LT "Metropolitan / LT Maroon"	London Underground Depot West Ruislip	76297 was originally in unit 415, 71163 was originally in unit 302 and 70823 was originally in unit 412

== 4-COR ==
Unit No.	Type	DMBTO	TTK	Trailer	DMBTO	Livery	Owner	Notes
3131	4-COR	11179	-	-	-	SR Dark Green	National Railway Museum	-
3135	4-COR	11187	-	-	-	SR Green	Southern Electric Group	Now known as 3142 preserved at the East Kent Railway
3142	4-COR	11161	10096	TCK 11825	11201	SR Green	Southern Electric Group	11161 ex-4Res unit 3065. 11161 is now with 11187 as 3142 at the East Kent Railway.

== 4-EPB ==
Unit number (current in bold)			DMBSO	TSO	TSO	DMBSO	Built	Livery	Location
-	**5176**	-	14351	15354	15396	14352	1954 Eastleigh	SR Green/Blue with Electric Railway Museum logos	Northampton Ironstone Railway and 15354 at Hornby plc Margate as spares for 4 SUB 4732

== 4-DD ==
Unit number (current in bold)			DMBSO	TSO	TSO	DMBSO	Built	Livery	Location
-	**4002**	-	13003	-	-	13004	1949	BR Blue and BR Green	Northampton Ironstone Railway and Sellindge

== 4-REP ==
62482 is the last 4-REP in existence and is currently placed in storage in Nottingham. The 4REP appreciation society were looking at saving the remaining carriage and turning them back to a 4-REP.

== 4-VEP ==
Remaining unpreserved units/coaches

Unit Number (current in bold)				Type	DTCsoL	MBSO	TSO	DTCsoL	Livery	Location	Notes
7753	3053	3463	**3905**	4Vop	-	62266	-	-	Connex	Barrow Hill	62266 stored at Barrow Hill complete for spares for the 5-BEL project

Preservation

Unit number (current in bold)				Type	DTCsoL (*DTSsoL)	MBSO	TSO	DTCsoL	Livery	Location	Notes
7717	3017	**3417**	-	4Vep	76262	62236	70797	76263	BR Blue	Bluebell Railway.	Owned by the Bluebell Railway. Originally delivered to East Grinstead. Moved to Eastleigh March 2009, returned to the Bluebell Railway September 2010. Was stored in Clapham Junction yard with a broken pick-up shoe. Moved to Ilford Depot for full repaint into BR Blue then moved to Strawberry Hill Depot (near Twickenham) for storage and restoration, in care of Southern Electric Traction Group and to be main-line certified.
7753	3053	3463	**3905**	4Vop	76397	-	70904	76398	Connex	East Kent Railway	Donated for preservation by Brighton Belle Trust. Owned privately by 400series.co.uk and is being restored for use at the EKR. It still remains as a 4 VOP as it is using 62364 from 4 Cig 1499
7861	3161	**3545**	-	4Vep	76875	-	-	-	BR Blue/Grey	East Kent Railway	3545 was one of final units in traffic with South Eastern Trains. Only DTCsoL Preserved.
7867	3167	**3568**	-	4Vep	76887	-	-	-	Connex	Woking Miniature Railway	3568 was one of final units in traffic with South Eastern Trains.
404	3169	**3582**	-	4TC	76275	-	-	-	BR Blue/Grey	Swanage Railway	76275 was previously formed in 4TC unit 8004 (ex-404). It resides at the Swanage Railway for the 4TC project.

== 5-BEL ==
The table below sets out the current position:

Number	Name	Location	Note	Image
279	Hazel	Ramparts, Barrow Hill	5-BEL Trust, under restoration	
280	Audrey		VSOE, in service	
281	Gwen		VSOE, in service	
282	Doris	Ramparts, Barrow Hill	5-BEL Trust, to be restored	
283	Mona		VSOE, stored	
284	Vera		VSOE, in service	
285	Car No 85		5BEL Trust, under restoration	
286	Car No 86		VSOE, stored	
287	Car No 87	Southall	5-BEL Trust, under restoration	
288	Car No 88	Ramparts, Barrow Hill	5-BEL Trust, under restoration	
289	Car No 89	Little Mill Inn, Rowarth, Derbyshire	Privately owned,	
290	Car No 90		Destroyed by fire in 1991	
291	Car No 91	Ramparts, Barrow Hill	5-BEL Trust, under restoration	
292	Car No 92		VSOE, stored	
293	Car No 93	Ramparts, Barrow Hill	VSOE, stored	

== 6-PUL ==
After withdrawal from passenger service, the underframes of several PUL and PAN unit carriages were reused by the engineering department as long-welded rail carriers and crane runners.

Former 6-PUL Pullman cars 264 Ruth and 278 Bertha have been preserved, and are now used as ordinary locomotive-hauled Pullman cars. Number 264 is part of the Venice Simplon Orient Express fleet, working charter trains on the main line, while 278 is on the Swanage Railway. Former 6-PUL Trailer Composite car, number 11773, was preserved on the Swanage Railway for many years, but fell into bad condition and has now been scrapped.

== GLV ==
Key:	In service	Withdrawn	Preserved

Unit no.	Vehicle nos.		Operator	Withdrawn	Status
Unit no.	DMLV	ex-DMBSO	Operator	Withdrawn	Status
489101	68500	61269	Ecclesbourne Valley Railway	2002	Preserved
489102	68501	61281	Rail Operations Group	-	In service as barrier translator vehicle.
489104	68503	61277	Spa Valley Railway	2005	Preserved.
489105	68504	61286	Rail Operations Group	-	In service as barrier translator vehicle.
489106	68505	61299	Network Rail	-	De-icing unit. Stored at Eastleigh.
489107	68506	61292	Ecclesbourne Valley Railway	2002	Preserved
489110	68509	61280	Barry Tourist Railway	2005	Preserved. Also was featured in Series 11 Episode 1 of Doctor Who in 2018.

== MLV ==
Key:	Preserved

Unit Number		Final Livery	DMLV	Withdrawn	Status
Original	Departmental	Final Livery	DMLV	Withdrawn	Status
9001	931091	SR Green	68001	1998	Preserved by the EPB Preservation Group at WCRC Southall.
9002	931092	NSE	68002	2004	Preserved by the EPB Preservation Group at WCRC Southall.
9003	931093	Grey	68003	1997	Preserved and working at the Eden Valley Railway
9004	931094	Light Green	68004	1997	Preserved at the Mid-Norfolk Railway
9005	931095	LSE "Jaffa Cake"	68005	1997	Preserved and working at the Eden Valley Railway
9008	931098	Green	68008	1997	Stored at Southall Depot
9009	931099	Green	68009	1997	Stored at Southall Depot - Heavily stripped and poor bodywork
9010	931090	Dark Green	68010	1997	Preserved at the Eden Valley Railway

== Waterloo & City Line ==
A single DMBSO of Class 487 stock, No. 61, used on the Waterloo & City line has been preserved at the London Transport Museum Depot in Acton.
