= Sandford, Cumbria =

Village in Cumbria, England

Coordinates: 54.540°N 2.419°W

Sandford
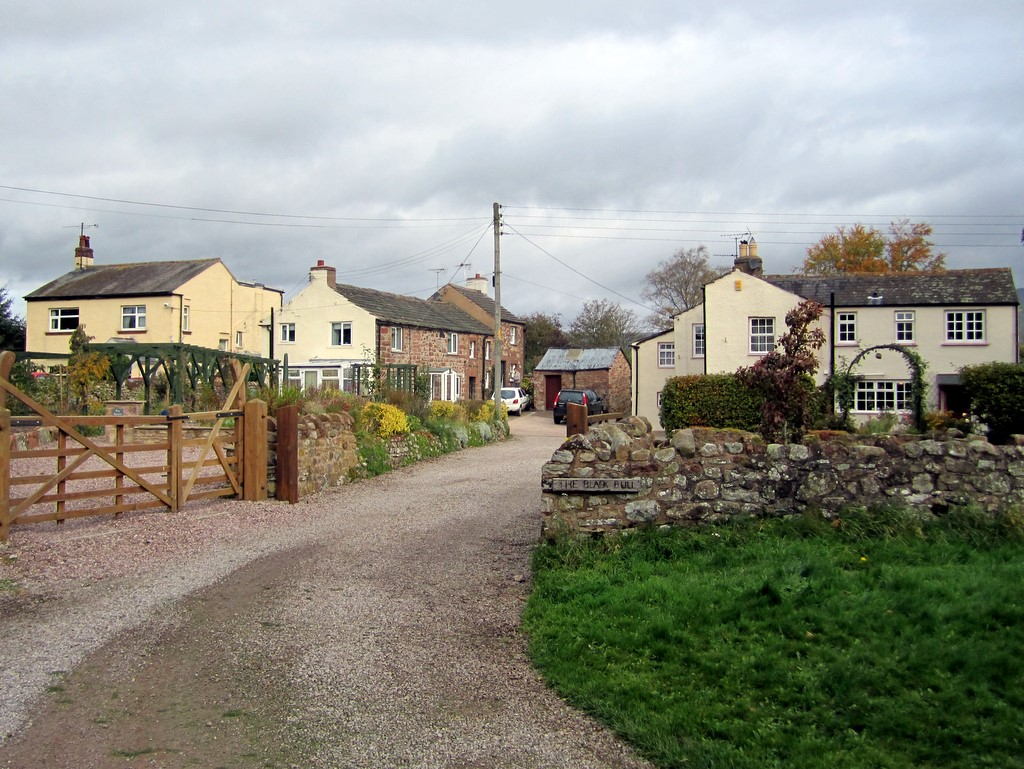
- The Square, Sandford

- Location in Eden, Cumbria Location within Cumbria
- OS grid reference: NY728161
- Civil parish: Warcop
- Unitary authority: Westmorland and Furness
- Ceremonial county: Cumbria
- Region: North West
- Country: England
- Sovereign state: United Kingdom
- Post town: APPLEBY-IN-WESTMORLAND
- Postcode district: CA16
- Dialling code: 017683
- Police: Cumbria
- Fire: Cumbria
- Ambulance: North West
- UK Parliament: Westmorland and Lonsdale

Sandford is a small village in the Westmorland and Furness district, in the county of Cumbria, England. It is near the A66 road. It has one pub.

== See also ==
- Listed buildings in Warcop
