= John Musgrove =

John Musgrove can refer to:

- John Musgrove (cricketer) (1861-1940), Australian cricketer
- John Musgrove (politician), American politician
- Sir John Musgrove, 1st Baronet (1793-1881), British politician
