= Musgrove =

Musgrove may refer to:

== Places ==
- Musgrove Mill State Historic Site, an American Revolutionary War battlesite in South Carolina, United States
- Charlton Musgrove, a village and civil parish in Somerset, England

== People ==
- Musgrove (surname), including a list of people with the name

== Other uses ==
- Musgrove Block, a historic building in Andover, Massachusetts, United States
- Musgrove Evans House, a historic site in Tecumseh, Michigan, United States

== See also ==
- Musgrave (disambiguation)
