= St Columba's Church, Warcop =

Coordinates: 54.5360°N 2.3988°W

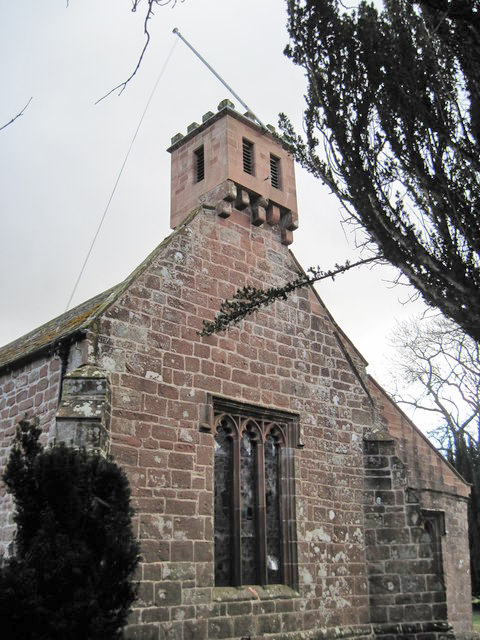
- West end of St Columba's Church, Warcop

- Location in Cumbria
- OS grid reference: NY 743 157
- Location: Warcop, Cumbria
- Country: England
- Denomination: Anglican
- Website: St Columba, Warcop

History
- Status: Parish church
- Dedication: Saint Columba

Architecture
- Functional status: Active
- Heritage designation: Grade I
- Designated: 12 September 1957
- Architects: J. S. Crowther (chancel)
- Architectural type: Church
- Style: Norman, Gothic, Gothic Revival
- Completed: 1855

Specifications
- Materials: Sandstone, slate roofs

Clergy
- Rector: Revd Andrew Burrell

St Columba's Church is in the village of Warcop, Cumbria, England. It is an active Anglican parish church in the deanery of Appleby, the archdeaconry of Carlisle, and the diocese of Carlisle. Its benefice is united with St Theobald, Musgrave and nine other parishes to form the Heart of Eden benefice. The church is recorded in the National Heritage List for England as a designated Grade I listed building. On Saint Peter's Day, 29 June, each year the church hosts a rushbearing ceremony.

== History ==
The church stands on the site of a former Roman camp, and in the medieval era was owned by Shap Abbey. It dates from the 12th century, with later alterations and additions. The chancel was rebuilt in 1854–55 by J. S. Crowther. The bellcote on the west gable has been rebuilt more than once. In the 1680s it was a triple bellcote; it is now double, and was last rebuilt in 2006.

== Architecture ==
=== Exterior ===
St Columba's is constructed in red sandstone with a slate roof, and has a cruciform plan. The plan consists of a nave, a south aisle, a south porch, north and south transepts, and a chancel. The north wall of the nave is Norman. At the west end of the church is a bellcote in the form of a turret, and adjacent to the south door is a "huge emergency buttress". The north transept is in Early English style. The windows in the nave and the aisle are in Perpendicular style, and the 19th-century chancel is Early English, with three widely-spaced lancet windows at the east end. The buttresses around the chancel are semi-octagonal in plan, and have square tops.

=== Interior ===
Inside the church is a two-bay Perpendicular south arcade. The chancel arch and both transept arches date from the 13th century, and the nave roof from the 15th century. There is a piscina in each transept because in the past they were used by different townships. The pews are all box pews, they are all numbered, and one is dated 1716. Most of the stained glass in the chancel windows is by William Wailes. The south transept contains two windows dating from the 1860s and 1870s by Heaton, Butler and Bayne. In the north wall of the nave is a window by Shrigley and Hunt dated 1893, and in the south aisle is a window of 1898 by Ninian Comper. In different positions inside the church are eight coffin-lids carved with foliated crosses. The south transept contains a worn effigy dating from 1788. The single-manual pipe organ was built for a Methodist chapel in Consett, County Durham, by Harrison and Harrison, and was moved here and installed in 1992.

== External features ==
In the churchyard to the south of the church are the remains of a cross, dating possibly from the medieval era. It consists of the stump of a cross-shaft set in a socket in a square plinth, and is listed at Grade II. Also outside the church is a medieval doorway that was moved from Burton Hall when it was demolished in 1957.

== See also ==
- Grade I listed churches in Cumbria
- Grade I listed buildings in Cumbria
- Listed buildings in Warcop
