= Warcop railway station =

Former railway station in England

Warcop
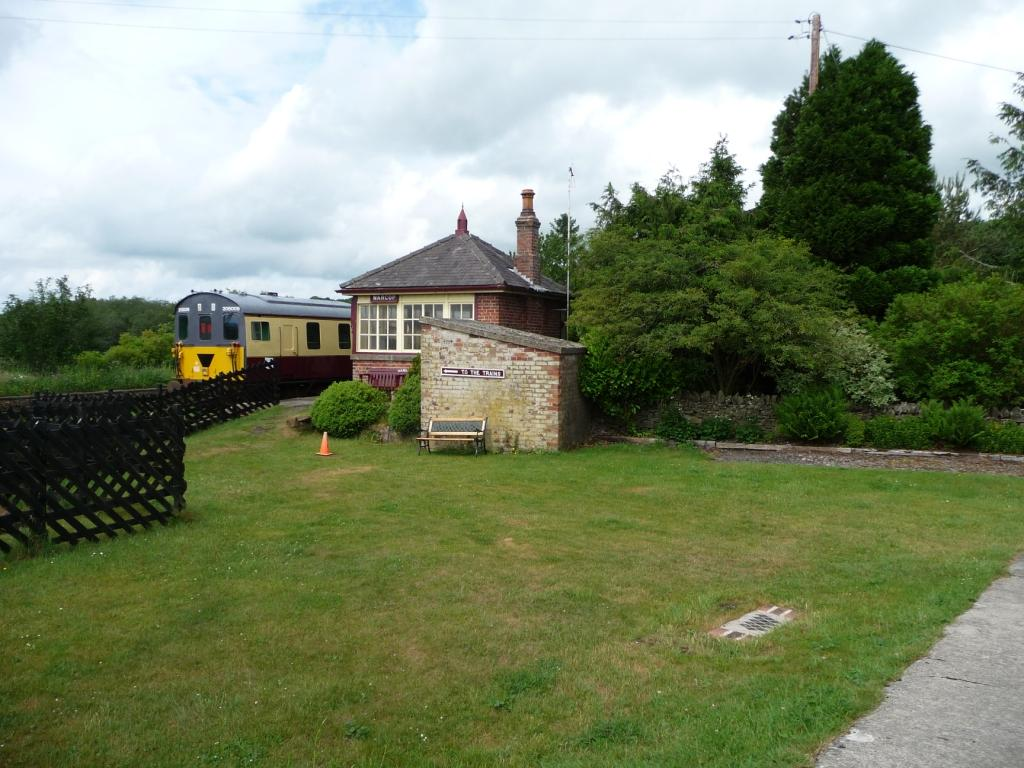
- Footpath to the trains. The heritage railway's trains depart from the original platform at Warcop, but the station building is in private ownership and most of their station infrastructure is now further east.

General information
- Location: Warcop, Westmorland and Furness; England
- Coordinates: 54.53596°N 2.38324°W
- Grid reference: NY753156
- System: Station on heritage railway
- Owner: Eden Valley Railway Trust
- Platforms: 1

History
- Original company: Eden Valley Railway
- Pre-grouping: North Eastern Railway (UK)

Key dates
- 9 June 1862: opened
- 22 January 1962: closed to regular passenger services
- May 1987: closed completely
Location

Warcop railway station was situated on the Eden Valley Railway between Penrith and Kirkby Stephen East. It served the village of Warcop. The station opened to passenger traffic on 9 June 1862, and closed on 22 January 1962. Freight traffic and the occasional troop special continued to use the line through the station (latterly serving a nearby Army camp) until at least May 1987.

The station was host to camping coach from 1935 to 1939 and may have had a coach visiting in 1934 and 1935.

In 1995 the Eden Valley Railway Society, now renamed the Eden Valley Railway Trust, was formed with the aim of restoring the line and reintroducing a train service. Passenger trains resumed running from Warcop in 2006 however in May 2007 an army lorry struck the railway bridge near Warcop causing the suspension of passenger services. The bridge was repaired in 2008, but too late for the 2008 season. Services recommenced in 2009.

The line is upgrading the track for public service towards Appleby East railway station (Phase 1).

Preceding station	Disused railways	Following station
Appleby East	Eden Valley Railway	Musgrave
