= Listed buildings in Musgrave, Cumbria =

Musgrave is a civil parish in Westmorland and Furness, Cumbria, England. It contains three listed buildings that are recorded in the National Heritage List for England. All the listed buildings are designated at Grade II, the lowest of the three grades, which is applied to "buildings of national importance and special interest". The parish contains the villages of Great Musgrave and Little Musgrave and is otherwise rural. The listed buildings comprise a house with a schoolroom, and a house and its forecourt railings.

== Buildings ==
Name and location	Photograph	Date	Notes
School; 54.52481°N 2.35733°W	—	1828	A house and school room in stone with quoins, and a slate roof with stone copings. The house has two storeys and three bays. There is a central gabled porch with a pointed head and a hood mould, cross-windows, and a trompe-l'œil window. To the east is a single-storey school room with a porch and windows similar to the house. All the windows have chamfered stone surrounds, square heads, and hood moulds.
Musgrave House; 54.51685°N 2.35981°W	—	Mid 19th century	A pebbledashed stone house with stuccoed angle pilasters and a slate roof. It has two storeys and a symmetrical front of three bays. The central door has an architrave, a rectangular fanlight, and a cornice, and the windows are sashes in stone surrounds.
Railings, Musgrave House; 54.51674°N 2.35981°W	—	Mid 19th century	Cast iron railings enclose the forecourt at the front of the house, They have moulded capitals with foliate decoration and finials. The gates are in wrought iron, and have scrolled decoration and fleurs-de-lis finials.
