= Musgrave Park =

Musgrave Park may refer to:

- Musgrave Park, Belfast
- Musgrave Park, Brisbane, Queensland, Australia
- Musgrave Park, Cork, Ireland
- Musgrave Park, South Australia, former name of Amata, South Australia
- Musgrave Park Hospital, Belfast

== See also ==
- Musgrave (disambiguation)
