= Philip Musgrave =

Philip Musgrave may refer to:

- Sir Philip Musgrave, 2nd Baronet (1607–1678), MP for Westmorland and a Royalist army officer
- Philip Musgrave (administrator) (1661–1689), Ordnance officer and MP for Appleby
- Sir Philip Musgrave, 6th Baronet (c. 1712–1795), MP for Westmorland
- Sir Philip Musgrave, 8th Baronet (1794–1827), MP for Petersfield and Carlisle

== See also ==
- Musgrave (surname)
- Musgrave baronets
