= Appleby East railway station =

Former railway station in Westmorland, England

Coordinates: 54.581°N 2.484°W

Appleby East
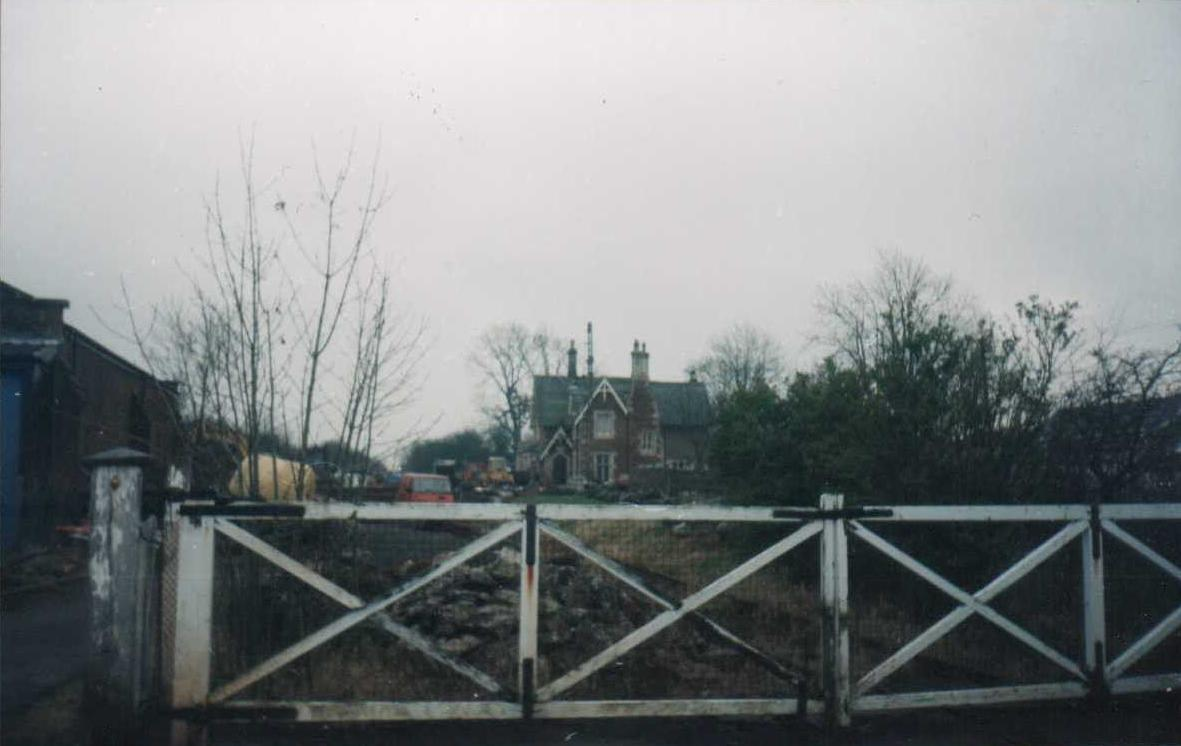
- Appleby East railway station in 1997.

General information
- Location: Appleby-in-Westmorland, Westmorland and Furness, Cumbria; England
- Platforms: 1

Other information
- Status: Disused

History
- Original company: Eden Valley Railway
- Pre-grouping: North Eastern Railway
- Post-grouping: London and North Eastern Railway

Key dates
- 9 June 1862: Station opened as Appleby
- 1 September 1952: Station renamed Appleby East
- 22 January 1962: Station closed
Location
- Location within the former Eden District Location within Cumbria

Appleby East is a closed railway station that was a stop on the Eden Valley Railway in Appleby-in-Westmorland, Cumberland (now in Cumbria), England; it was located between Kirkby Stephen East and Penrith. The station was formerly one of two that served the town, the other being Appleby West on the Midland Railway's Settle to Carlisle line; the latter station is still open, albeit now simply called Appleby.

== History ==
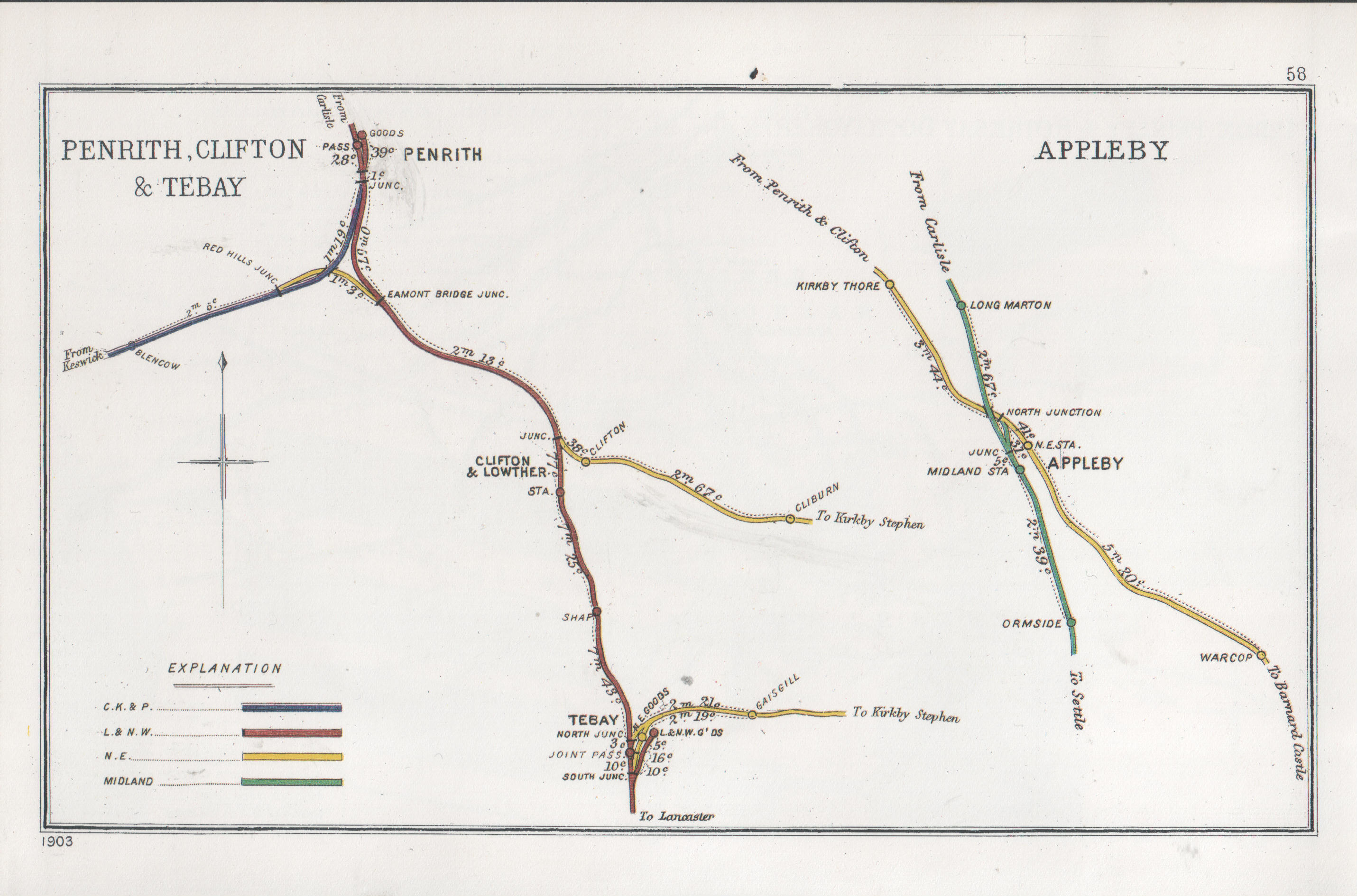
Appleby stations in 1903 (right of diagram)

Opened by the Eden Valley Railway, it became part of the London and North Eastern Railway during the Grouping of 1923. Passing to the Eastern Region of British Railways on nationalisation in 1948, it was then closed by the British Transport Commission in 1962.

Preceding station	Historical railways	Following station
Kirkby Thore	North Eastern Railway; Eden Valley Railway	Warcop

== The site today ==
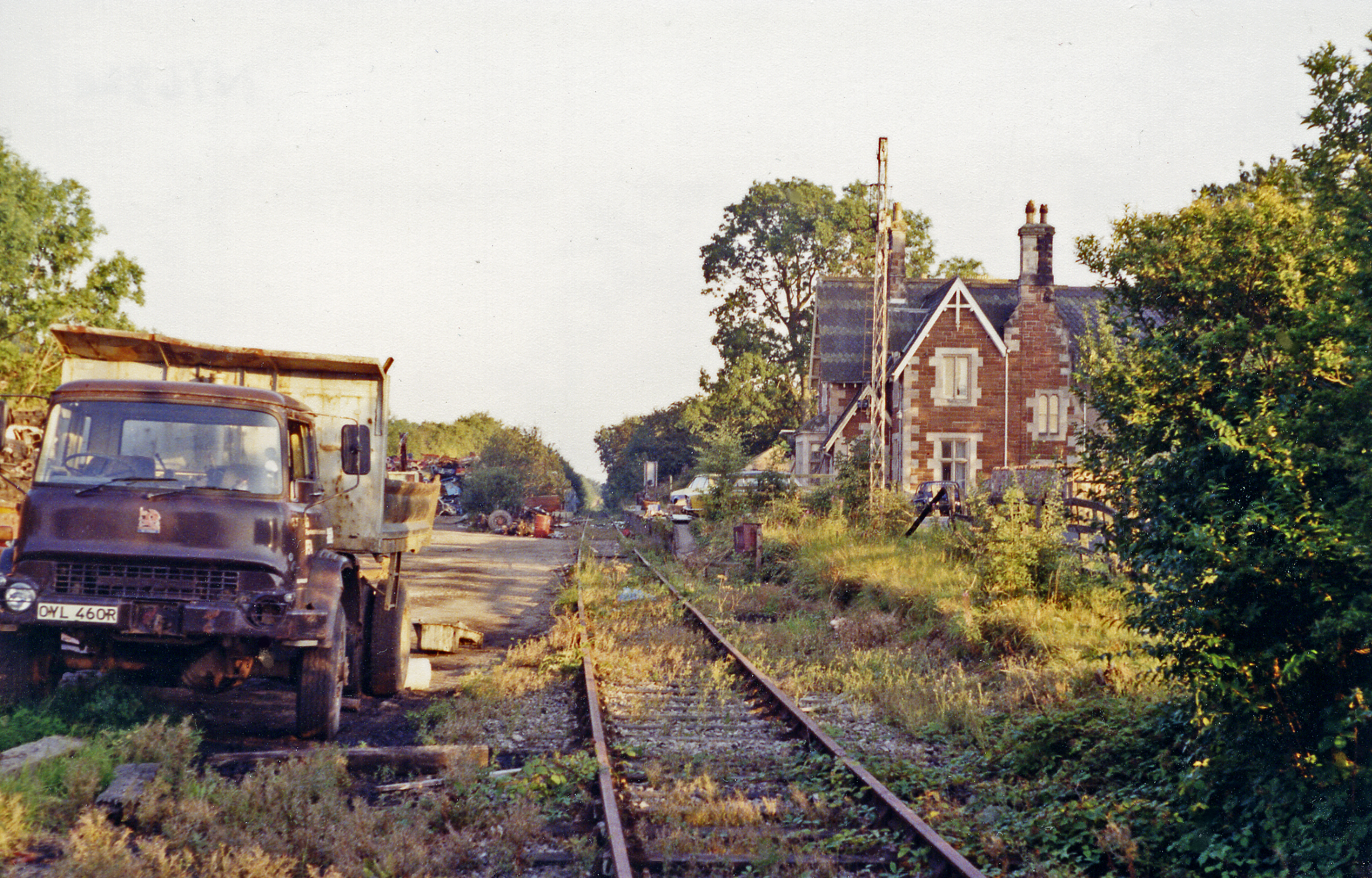
Remains of the station in 1991

The station is fairly intact and is used currently by a scrap merchant.

In 1995, the Eden Valley Railway Society was formed with the aim of restoring the line and reintroducing a train service. The society, now renamed the Eden Valley Railway Trust, operates a heritage service from Warcop station and is upgrading the track towards Appleby East for public service.

== Sources ==
- Walton, Peter (1992). The Stainmore & Eden Valley Railways. Oxford Publishing Co. ISBN 0-86093-306-7.
- Butt, R. V. J. (October 1995). The Directory of Railway Stations: details every public and private passenger station, halt, platform and stopping place, past and present (1st ed.). Sparkford: Patrick Stephens Ltd. ISBN 978-1-85260-508-7. OCLC 60251199. OL 11956311M.
- Jowett, Alan (2000). Jowett's Nationalised Railway Atlas (1st ed.). Penryn, Cornwall: Atlantic Transport Publishers. ISBN 978-0-906899-99-1. OCLC 228266687.
- British Railways Pre-Grouping Atlas And Gazetteer. Ian Allan Publishing. 1997 [1958]. ISBN 0-7110-0320-3.
