= Christopher Musgrave =

Christopher Musgrave may refer to:

- Christopher Musgrave (born c.1553), MP for Carlisle (UK Parliament constituency)
- Sir Christopher Musgrave, 4th Baronet (1631–1704), Tory politician and MP, teller of the Exchequer
- Christopher Musgrave (administrator) (1664–1718), British Ordnance officer and son of the 4th Baronet, MP for Carlisle (UK Parliament constituency)
- Sir Christopher Musgrave, 5th Baronet (1688–1736), MP and grandson of the 4th Baronet, MP for Cumberland and Carlisle

== See also ==
- Musgrave (surname)
- Musgrave baronets
