= Musgraves =

Musgraves may refer to:

- Musgrave Group, an Irish food wholesaler
- The Musgraves, British roots-pop band

== People with the surname Musgraves ==
- Dennis Musgraves (born 1943), American baseball player
- Kacey Musgraves (born 1988), American country music singer and songwriter

== See also ==
- Musgrave (disambiguation)
