= Northamptonshire Ironstone Railway Trust =

English heritage railway operator

Coordinates: 52.2196°N 0.926°W

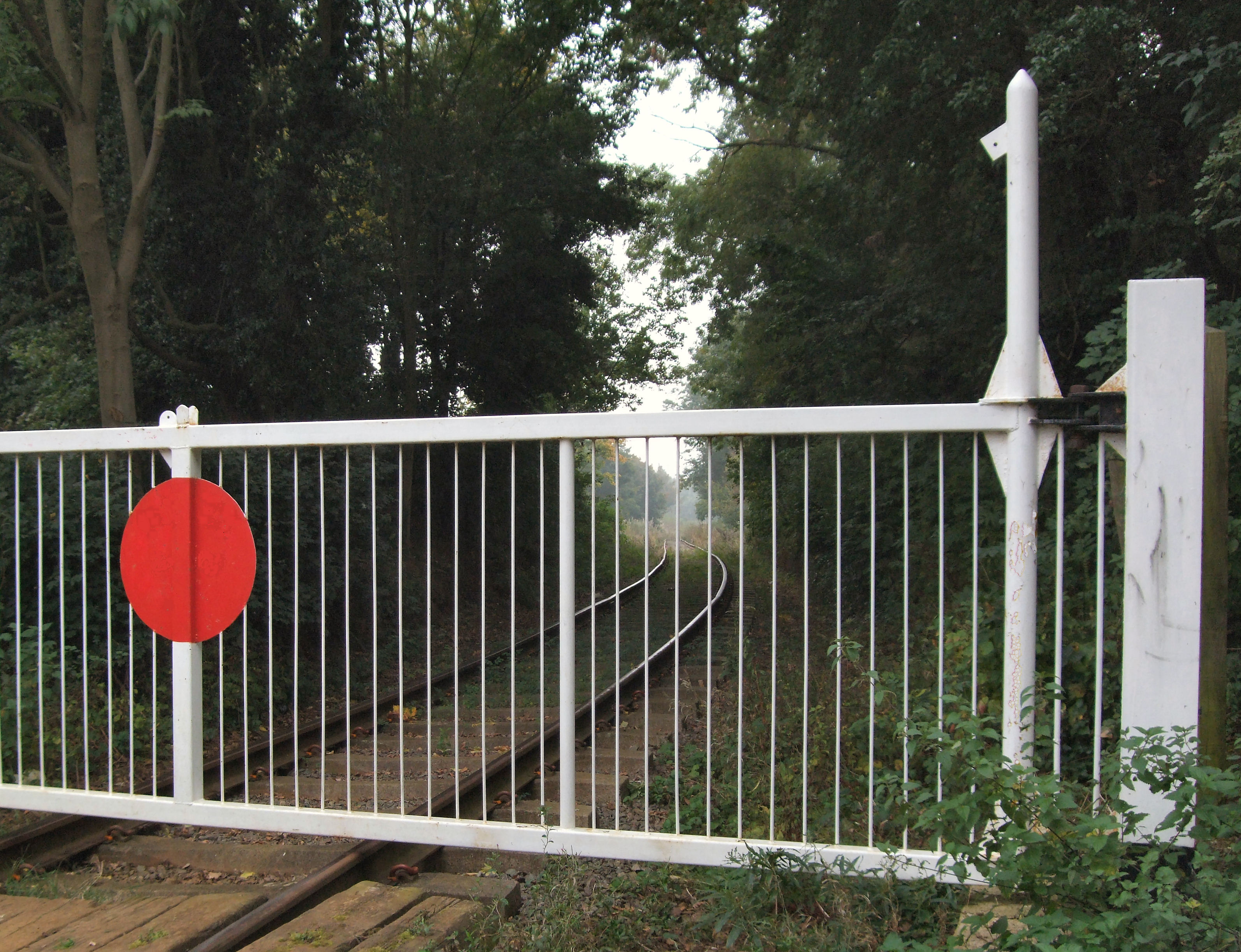
- A level crossing on the railway

Commercial operations
- Original gauge: 4 ft 8 1/2 in (1,435 mm) standard gauge

Preserved operations
- Length: 1 1/2 mi (2.4 km)
- Preserved gauge: 4 ft 8 1/2 in (1,435 mm) standard gauge

The Northamptonshire Ironstone Railway Trust operates a 1 1/2-mile (2.4 km) long heritage railway line at Hunsbury Hill, south-west of Northampton. The line is mainly dedicated to freight working, featuring many sharp curves and steep gradients which were typical of the industrial railway, but rides are available in a variety of vehicles including a converted brake van.

== Restoration ==
In the last few years the site has undergone restoration with 1/4 mile (0.4 km) of line being regraded and relaid in 113 lb/yd (56.1 kg/m) rail and concrete sleepers, along with the restoration of 2 locomotives and brake van to enable passenger carrying as well as other restoration projects being undertaken. Operationally the railway has received full operating clearance from the HMRI to allow running on the relaid section of the 1st quarter of the mile of the route.

== Locomotives ==
=== Steam ===
Railway	Number or name	Type or Class	Builder	Works Number	Built	Wheels	Gauge	Notes	Image
	Belvedere		Sentinel	9365	1946	4wVBT	4 ft 8 1/2 in (1,435 mm)	On Static Display	
	Musketeer		Sentinel	9369	1946	4wVBT	4 ft 8 1/2 in (1,435 mm)	On Static Display	
7	?		Peckett and Sons	2130	1951	0-4-0ST	4 ft 8 1/2 in (1,435 mm)	Operational, returned to steam in 2016 at the Battlefield Line Railway and moved to NIRT in 2020.	

=== Diesel ===
- Planet 4wDH. No. 3967 - Undergoing restoration.
- No. 2087 Hunslet Engine Company 0-4-0DM Built 1940. Undergoing restoration.
- Hudswell Clarke 0-4-0 No. D697 Built 1950. Undergoing restoration.
- Ruston & Hornsby 88DS 4wDM No. 242868. Built in 1946 - Operational.
- Fowler 0-4-0DH No. 4220001 "Charles Wake" built in 1959 – Operational.
- Fowler 0-4-0DH No. 4200016 "Flying Falcon". Built in 1962 - Operational
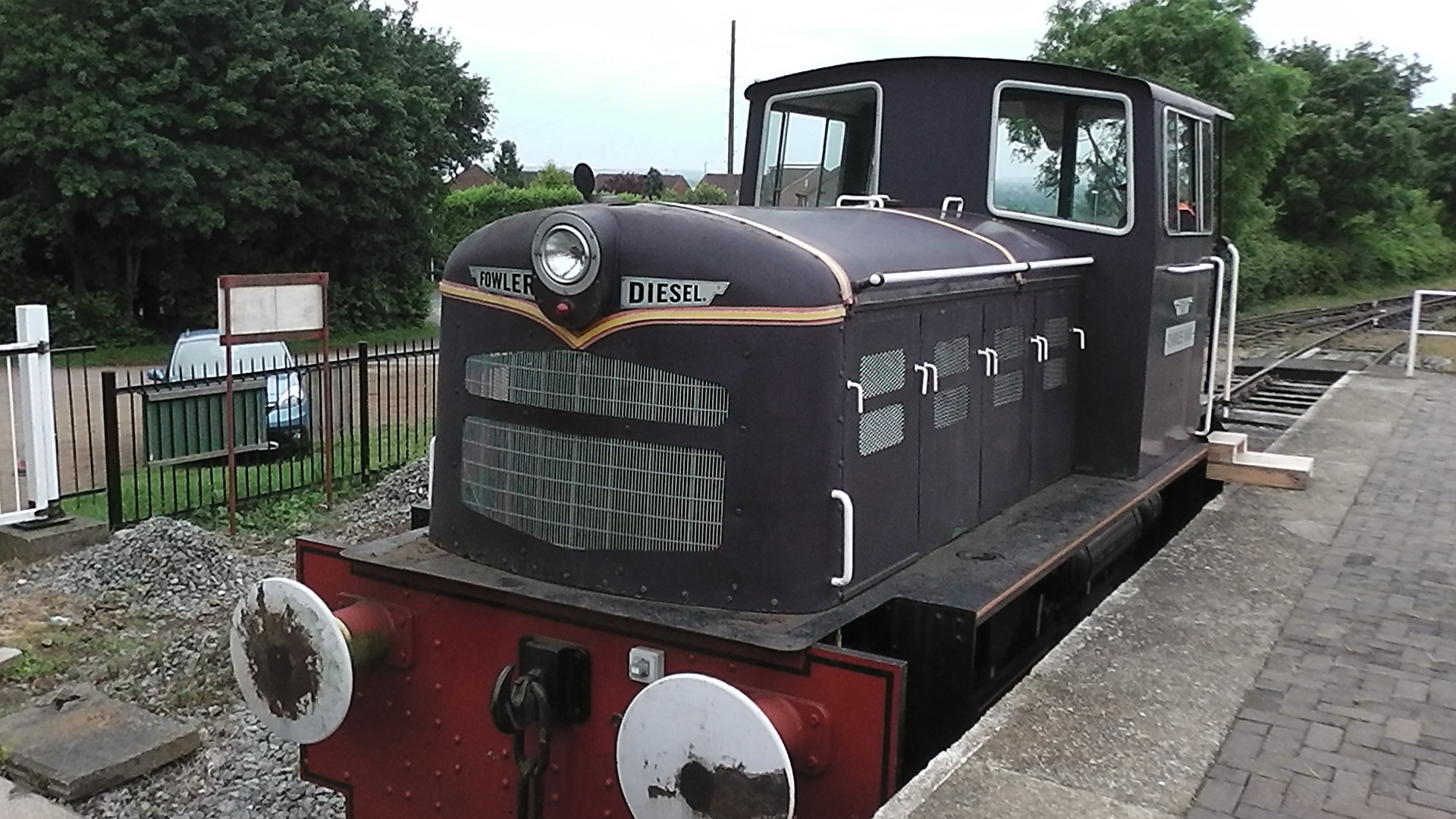
  Fowler 4220001
- Fowler 0-4-0DM No. 4220022. Built in 1947 - Undergoing restoration.
- BR Class 02 - Diesel Hydraulic No. D2867. Built 1960-61, arrived June 2023, overhauled and repainted during the summer 2023, operational.

=== Former Locomotives ===
- "Waleswood" Hudswell Clarke 0-4-0ST No. 750. Built in 1906. The locomotive was completely overhauled at the railway until 2019, when it left the railway on 1 September for the Chasewater Railway.
- Ruston & Hornsby 88DS 4wDM No. 394014. Built in 1956 - Departed January 2023.

== Rolling stock ==
- B950061 20-ton LMS (BR-built) brake van – operational. Built in 1950 to an LMS design.
- B490310 12-ton LNER (BR-built) open wagon. Built in 1952.
- M407942 12-ton LMS open wagon. Built in 1937.
- 321734 Ex Ruston "88" underframe - named 'Mabel'
- No. 330 Nordberg trackmachine
- Joseph Booth steam crane
- S56134 SR pillbox brake van
- BR86803 BR GUV Mk1 converted to crane runner wagon
