= Thomas Musgrave =

Thomas Musgrave may refer to:

- Thomas Moore Musgrave (1774–1854), British postmaster of Bath and translator
- Thomas Musgrave (academic), 16th-century English physician and academic
- Thomas Musgrave of Bewcastle, 16th-century English soldier and border official
- Thomas Musgrave (bishop) (1788–1860), British archbishop of York
- Thomas Musgrave (castaway) (1832–1891), Australian ship's captain and castaway
- Thomas Musgrave (priest) (died 1686), dean of Carlisle
- Thomas Cebern Musgrave Jr. (1913–2005), US Air Force officer
- Sir Thomas Musgrave, 7th Baronet (1737–1812), English general
- Thomas Musgrave (MP) for Appleby
