= Grace Musgrove =

Australian triathlete

Personal information
- Born: 18 June 1992 (age 33) Bowral, NSW, Australia
- Height: 1.64 m (5 ft 4 1/2 in)

Sport
- Country: Australia
- Sport: Triathlon

Grace Musgrove (born 18 June 1992) is an Australian triathlete.

She has competed at various levels including domestic championships such as the Oceania Cross Country Championships and in international events such as the Grand Prix de Triathlon. She has also represented Australia in various international open events.

== Personal life ==
She was born on 18 June 1992, in Bowral, New South Wales, Australia. Her hometown is Moss Vale but she currently resides in Wollongong. In her senior year in high school she won the National Cross Country title.

== Achievements ==
- 2015 - Davenport Oceania Championship, 5th place.
- 2015 - Under 23 Australian Championships, 2nd place.
- 2013 - Geelong Oceania Cup, 2nd place - Australian Sprint Distance title
- 2013 - Wellington Oceania Championships, 3rd place
- 2013 - Mooloolaba Oceania Cup, 1st place
- 2012 - Tongyeong World Cup, 13th place
- 2012 - A number of top 10 placings in European Cups
- 2012 – Mooloolaba Oceania Cup, 8th place
- 2012 – Subic Bay Asian Cup, 2nd place

Her coach is Jamie Turner.
