= Great Musgrave =

Village in Cumbria, England

Coordinates: 54.516°N 2.361°W

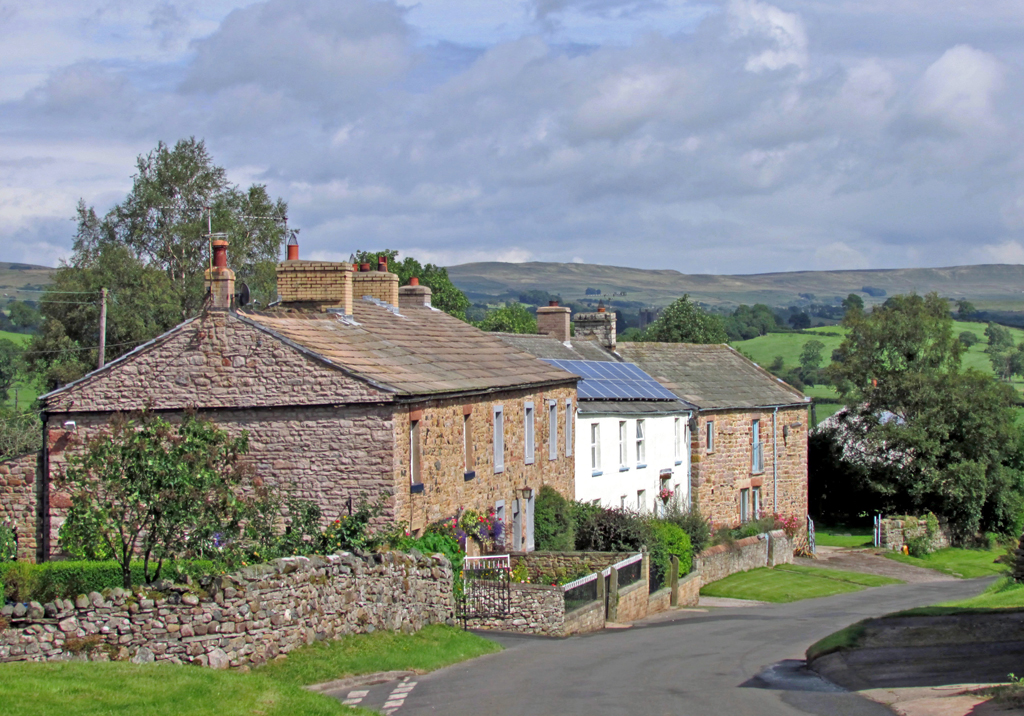
- Stone-built cottages in the main village street

- Location in Eden, Cumbria Location within Cumbria
- OS grid reference: NY767135
- Civil parish: Musgrave
- Unitary authority: Westmorland and Furness
- Ceremonial county: Cumbria
- Region: North West
- Country: England
- Sovereign state: United Kingdom
- Post town: KIRKBY STEPHEN
- Postcode district: CA17
- Dialling code: 017683
- Police: Cumbria
- Fire: Cumbria
- Ambulance: North West
- UK Parliament: Westmorland and Lonsdale

Great Musgrave is a village and former civil parish, now in the parish of Musgrave, in the Westmorland and Furness district of Cumbria, England. It is about a mile west of Brough. In 1891 the parish had a population of 175.

Great Musgrave sits atop a hill near the River Eden and Swindale Beck. Its location provides views over the vale of Eden and the nearby northern Pennines. The village name comes from the Musgrave family who lived here.

== Church ==
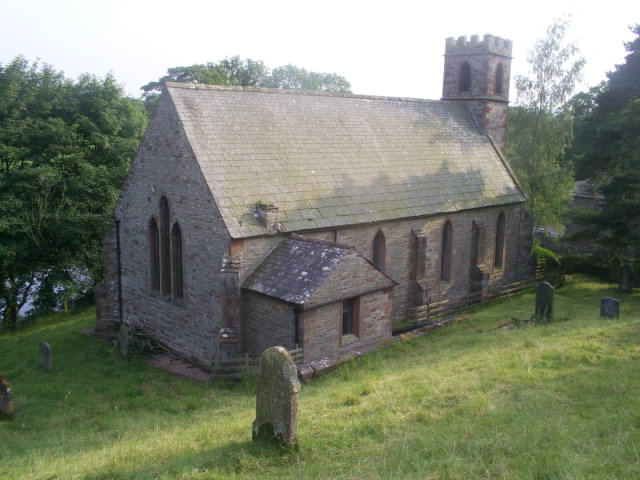
St Theobald's Church, Great Musgrave

The stone church of St. Theobald, located on the outskirts of the village, was constructed between 1845 and 1846. However, two earlier churches, with the first dating back to the 12th century, once stood nearby. Regrettably, their proximity to the river made them vulnerable to flooding. In 1822, floodwaters reached a depth of 3 feet (0.9 m) inside the church.

Leading up to the present church with its slate roof is a row of horse chestnut trees. The square church tower contains two bells. The interior has one small stained glass window, a 13th-century coffin lid, a brass of a priest dated 1500 and carved heads on the roof beam corbels above the windows.

The church has an annual rush bearing ceremony on the first Saturday in July. Girls wear garlands of flowers, and boys carry rush crosses in a procession through the village and to the church where a service of praise and thanksgiving is then held.

== History ==
On 30 December 1894 the parish was abolished and merged with "Little Musgrave" to form "Musgrave".

The village was served by the Eden Valley Railway's Musgrave railway station which opened in 1862 and closed in 1952.

== Infilling of railway bridge ==
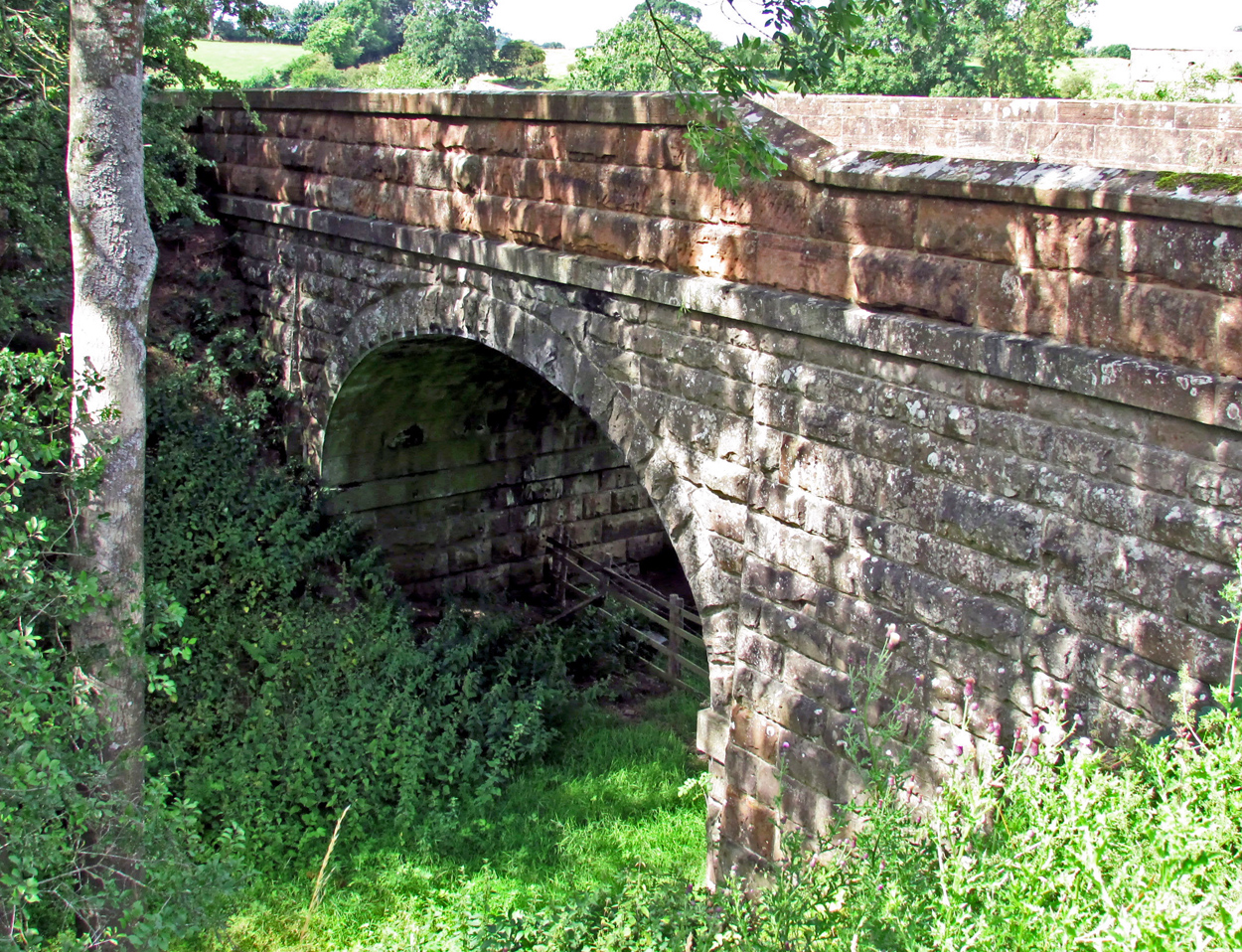
Surviving bridge over railway cutting just north of the station in 2016

In May and June 2021, the space under the B6259 road bridge at Great Musgrave, north of the former railway station, was filled with 1,600 tonnes of aggregate and concrete by Highways England, now known as National Highways.

The structure was part of a five-mile section of line which local rail enthusiasts hoped to restore, relinking the Eden Valley Railway and the Stainmore railway to create an 11-mile tourist line between Appleby and Kirkby Stephen. Highways England claimed to have consulted both railways prior to the work taking place, but this was denied by the two organisations who wrote a letter of complaint to Nick Harris, the company's Acting Chief Executive.

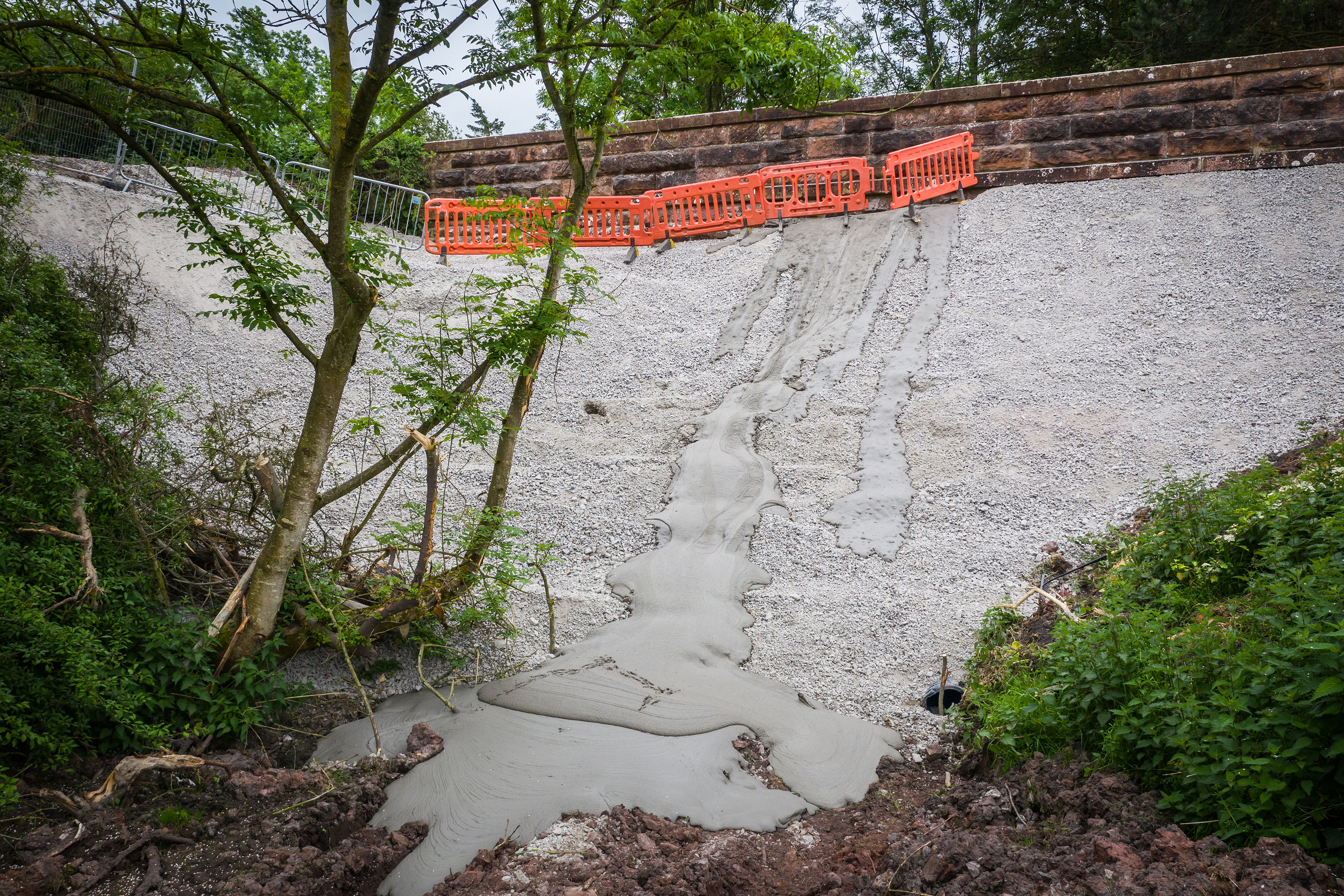
The north side of Great Musgrave bridge after concrete was pumped under its arch on 16 June 2021.

The infilling was carried out under emergency development powers, colloquially known as 'Class Q', after officers from Eden District Council asked for the work to be paused whilst planning requirements were confirmed. Highways England's engineer refused, stating on 24 June 2021 that the works were required "to prevent the failure of the bridge and avert a collapse".

However, in May 2022, Bill Harvey Associates, a company specialising in masonry arch bridges, published an in-depth study reviewing engineering evidence and inspection reports about the bridge, sourced from Highways England. The report concluded that:

- There is no evidence in the reports examined to suggest a current or developing risk of collapse.
- There is no evidence for a current or likely emergency.
- All evidence presented suggests that the bridge is, as stated by the 2021 examiner, "in fair condition".

The backlash against the Great Musgrave infill scheme became national news and the government intervened to pause infilling and demolition schemes at dozens of other railway bridges across the country. Many civil engineers expressed shame and embarrassment at the negative impact on their professional reputation.

Highways England was forced to apply for retrospective planning permission for the infilling works, with Eden District Council receiving 911 objections and only two expressions of support. Advised by planning officers to reject the application, the council's planning committee unanimously refused retrospective planning permission on 16 June 2022. Restoration of Great Musgrave bridge to its former condition, together with additional strengthening, could cost an estimated £431,000, in addition to the £124,000 spent on the initial infilling work.

National Highways agreed to abide by an enforcement notice issued by Eden District Council which required the infill to be removed and the surrounding landscape restored to its condition prior to the infilling works. This notice became effective on 11 October 2022 and the work had to be completed within 12 months of this date. In July 2023, National Highways' plans to restore the bridge and remove the infill were criticised by locals as they involved closing the bridge for three months, necessitating long local diversions for regular users of the B6259 which crosses the bridge. In August 2023, work began to remove the infill material, with the final bill being confirmed at £352,000, almost three times the original infilling cost.

After the Great Musgrave outcry, National Highways developed a new way to determine the nature of major works to the disused railway structures it manages, with proposals reviewed by experts from heritage, environmental, planning and active travel organisations who collectively form the company's Stakeholder Advisory Forum.

== See also ==
- Listed buildings in Musgrave, Cumbria
