= John Musgrove (politician) =

American politician

Member of the Montana House of Representatives from the 34th district
- In office 2001–2009

Personal details
- Party: Democratic Party

John Musgrove is a former Democratic Party member of the Montana House of Representatives who represented the 34th district from 2001 to 2009.
