= Warcop =

Village in Cumbria, England

Coordinates: 54.52499°N 2.42677°W

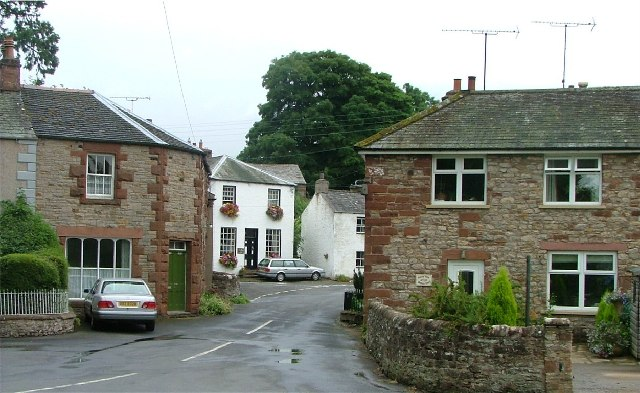
- Warcop

- Location within Cumbria
- Population: 532 (2011)
- OS grid reference: NY7214
- Civil parish: Warcop
- Unitary authority: Westmorland and Furness
- Ceremonial county: Cumbria
- Region: North West
- Country: England
- Sovereign state: United Kingdom
- Post town: APPLEBY IN WESTMORLAND
- Postcode district: CA16
- Dialling code: 01768
- Police: Cumbria
- Fire: Cumbria
- Ambulance: North West
- UK Parliament: Westmorland and Lonsdale

Warcop is a village and civil parish in Westmorland and Furness, Cumbria, England, which had a population of 532 at the 2011 census.

It is near the A66 road, 5 miles (8.0 km) north of Kirkby Stephen and 5 miles south of Appleby-in-Westmorland.

== Name ==
The name Warcop means 'hill with a cairn', and was spelt Warthecopp and otherwise in the 13th century and earlier. It is a compound word that combines viking age Old Norse varða (cairn, a pile of stones) and the Old English copp (a summit or hill top). The lords of the manor of Warthecopp / Warcop over time changed their surname from Warthecopp to Warcop.

== History ==
The local Church of England parish is St Columba's Church, Warcop, which is a Norman church and is built on the site of a Roman marching camp. It holds an annual "Rushbearing Festival" each year in late June. Warcop boasts the oldest usable bridge over the River Eden, which dates from the 14th century or earlier.

The village has houses that date from at least the 15th century: Warcop Tower c. 1400 or before and Warcop Hall c. 1500; other houses date from the 17th or 18th century to the present day. It was historically part of Westmorland until 1974.

Warcop had its own railway station, Warcop railway station from 1862, which closed in 1962. The station yard (the station house is a private residence) has now reopened as part of the Eden Valley Railway.

The Ministry of Defence operates the Warcop Training Area to the North West of Warcop, providing tank and infantry training.

== Governance ==
An electoral ward in the same name exists. This ward stretches north to Murton with a total population taken at the 2011 Census of 1,352.

== Climate ==
Climate data for Warcop, Elevation: 227 m (745 ft), 1991–2020 normals
Month	Jan	Feb	Mar	Apr	May	Jun	Jul	Aug	Sep	Oct	Nov	Dec	Year
Mean daily maximum °C (°F)	5.8 (42.4)	6.3 (43.3)	8.3 (46.9)	11.2 (52.2)	14.4 (57.9)	16.8 (62.2)	18.7 (65.7)	18.0 (64.4)	15.8 (60.4)	12.2 (54.0)	8.7 (47.7)	6.3 (43.3)	11.9 (53.4)
Daily mean °C (°F)	3.4 (38.1)	3.6 (38.5)	5.1 (41.2)	7.4 (45.3)	10.2 (50.4)	12.8 (55.0)	14.8 (58.6)	14.4 (57.9)	12.3 (54.1)	9.2 (48.6)	6.0 (42.8)	3.7 (38.7)	8.6 (47.4)
Mean daily minimum °C (°F)	1.0 (33.8)	0.9 (33.6)	1.8 (35.2)	3.6 (38.5)	6.0 (42.8)	8.9 (48.0)	10.9 (51.6)	10.8 (51.4)	8.8 (47.8)	6.1 (43.0)	3.3 (37.9)	1.0 (33.8)	5.3 (41.5)
Average precipitation mm (inches)	93.7 (3.69)	76.3 (3.00)	62.6 (2.46)	50.6 (1.99)	52.9 (2.08)	63.3 (2.49)	75.9 (2.99)	89.7 (3.53)	74.0 (2.91)	94.2 (3.71)	101.3 (3.99)	104.2 (4.10)	938.7 (36.94)
Average precipitation days (≥ 1.0 mm)	14.9	12.7	12.3	10.9	10.7	11.3	12.3	13.0	11.8	15.3	16.1	15.5	156.8
Source: Met Office

== See also ==
- Listed buildings in Warcop
