= Musgrave, Cumbria =

Civil parish in Cumbria, England

Coordinates: 54.513°N 2.367°W

Musgrave
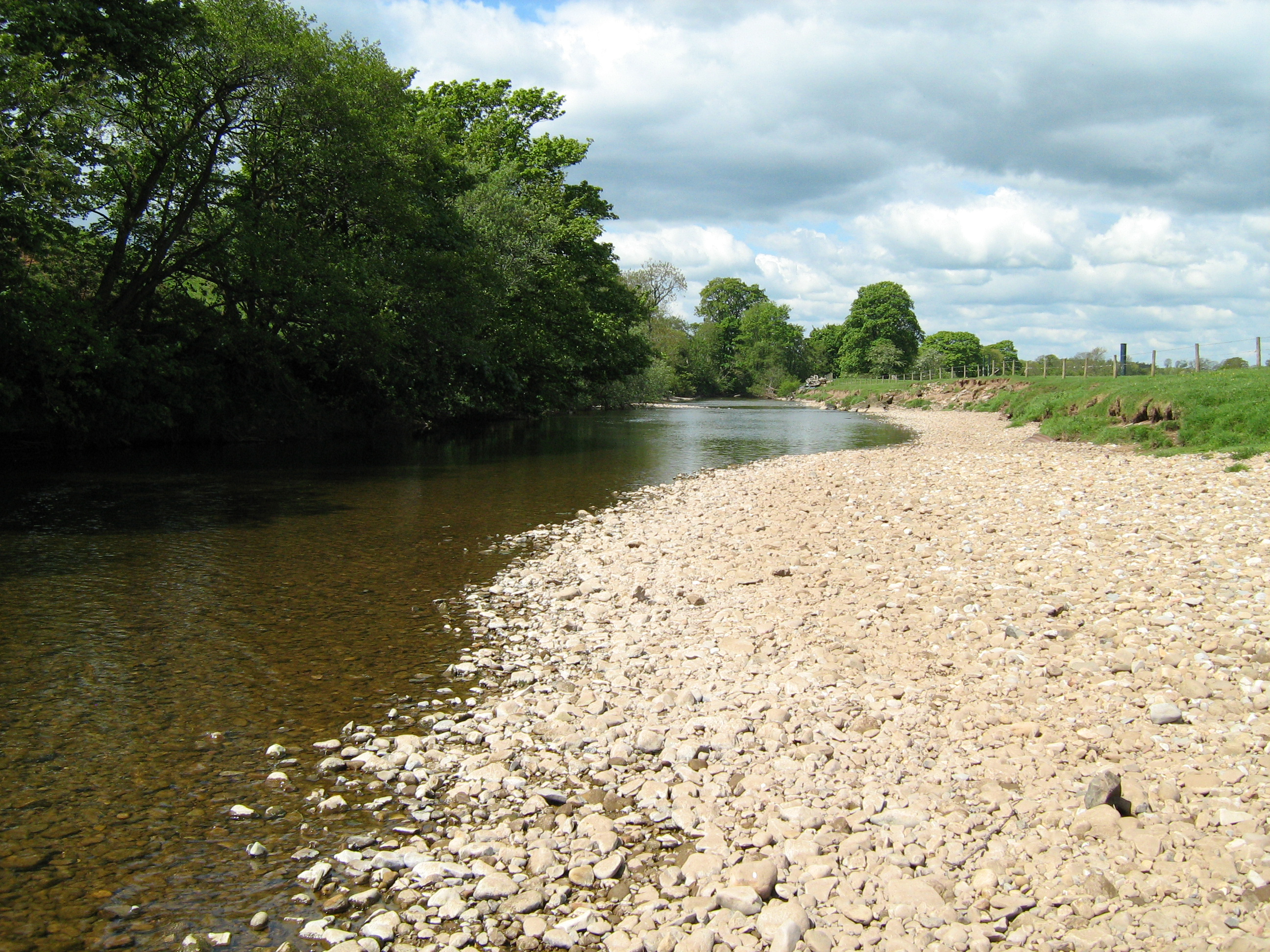
- River Eden below Musgrave Bridge

- Location within Cumbria
- Population: 152 (2001)
- OS grid reference: NY5520
- Civil parish: Musgrave
- Unitary authority: Westmorland and Furness
- Ceremonial county: Cumbria
- Region: North West
- Country: England
- Sovereign state: United Kingdom
- Post town: KIRKBY STEPHEN
- Postcode district: CA17
- Dialling code: 01768
- Police: Cumbria
- Fire: Cumbria
- Ambulance: North West
- UK Parliament: Westmorland and Lonsdale

Musgrave is a civil parish in the Westmorland and Furness district of Cumbria, England. It has a population of 152, and contains the villages of Little Musgrave and Great Musgrave. At the 2011 Census, data for Helbeck was included with Musgrave giving a total population of 165.

== See also ==
- Listed buildings in Musgrave, Cumbria
