= Sir John Musgrove, 1st Baronet =

British politician

Musgrove baronets
- Escutcheon of the Musgrove baronets of Speldhurst, Kent
- Creation date: 1851
- Status: extinct
- Extinction date: 1863
- Motto: Nil desperandum, Never despair

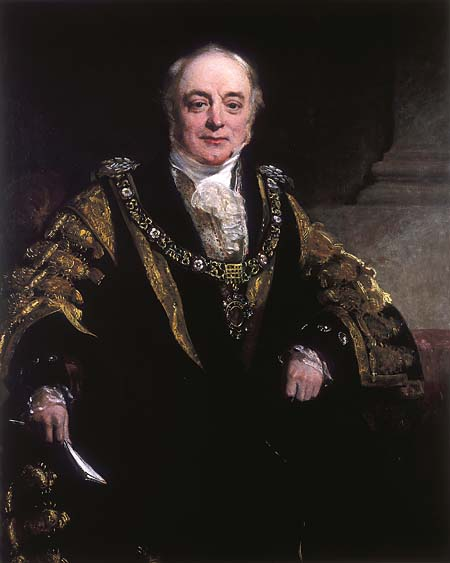
John Musgrove, Lord Mayor of London

Sir John Musgrove, 1st Baronet (21 January 1793 – 5 October 1881) was a British businessman and Lord Mayor of London.

Musgrove was the only son of John Musgrove, of Hackney, a London merchant. He was an auctioneer and house agent and had made his fortune by 1824 by taking advantage of rising property prices in London. He served as Master to The Clothworkers' Company in 1843–44, and again in 1862. He was Sheriff of London between 1843 and 1844 and Lord Mayor of London between 1850 and 1851. He was created a baronet, of Speldhurst in the County of Kent and of Russell Square in the County of Middlesex, in 1851.

Musgrove died at Rusthall House, Speldhurst, Kent, in October 1881, aged 88. The title died with him.

Civic offices
Preceded by Thomas Farncomb	Lord Mayor of London; 1850–1851	Succeeded by William Hunter
Baronetage of the United Kingdom
New creation	Baronet (of Speldhurst and Russell Square); 1851–1881	Extinct
