= Eden Valley Railway (heritage railway) =

Heritage railway in Cumbria, England

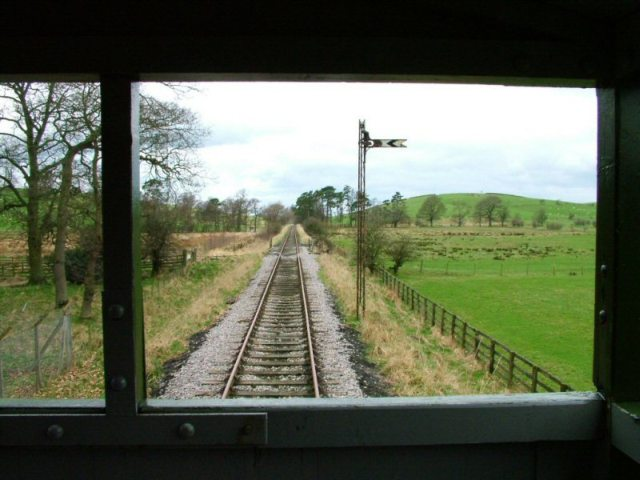
- The line west of Warcop seen from a brake van
- Coordinates: 54.535°N 2.381°W

Preserved operations
- Operated by: Eden Valley Railway Trust
- Stations: 1
- Length: 5.8 miles (9.3 km) - available 2.2 miles (3.5 km) - in use

Commercial history
- Opened: 1862
- Closed: 1962 - to passengers 1989 - to freight

Preservation history
- 1995: Eden Valley Railway Society formed
- 2004: Granted light railway order
- 2006: Opened from Warcop to Sandford
- 2013: Extended Sandford to Southfields
- Headquarters: Warcop

The Eden Valley Railway (EVR) is a standard gauge heritage railway in Cumbria, England. It runs over a 2.2 miles (3.5 km) section of the original Eden Valley Railway in a north-westerly direction from the line's base at Warcop station. The line is run by the Eden Valley Railway Trust, formerly the Eden Valley Railway Society.

The railway operates passenger trains from March to September on the weekends and Bank Holidays and some weekday workings in summer.

== History ==
The original Eden Valley Railway opened in 1862, linking Penrith and Kirkby Stephen via Appleby-in-Westmorland. Passenger traffic ended in 1962 and the line was reduced to the track between the junction at Appleby station with the Settle-Carlisle Line and Kirkby Stephen which served a quarry. By 1976 all that was left was 6 miles (9.7 km) of track between Appleby in Westmorland and Flitholme. It was used by infrequent British Army services to Warcop Training Area until 1989.

In 1995 the Eden Valley Railway Society was formed with the primary objective of restoring the Warcop to Appleby section of the line, and a secondary object of, if possible, extending it to Kirkby Stephen once the initial section was in operation. On 3 August 2004 the Eden Valley Railway Order 2004 (SI 2004/1817) came into action, allowing the trust to undertake railway operations (excluding non-self generated electrical railways) on the 9.3 kilometres (5.8 mi) track from Appleby to Flitholme near Warcop.

Heritage railway services resumed in 2006 between Warcop and Sandford, with an extension of 1/2 mile (0.80 km) to Southfields being opened in 2013, giving a current running line of almost 2 1/4 miles (3.6 km).

== Rolling stock ==
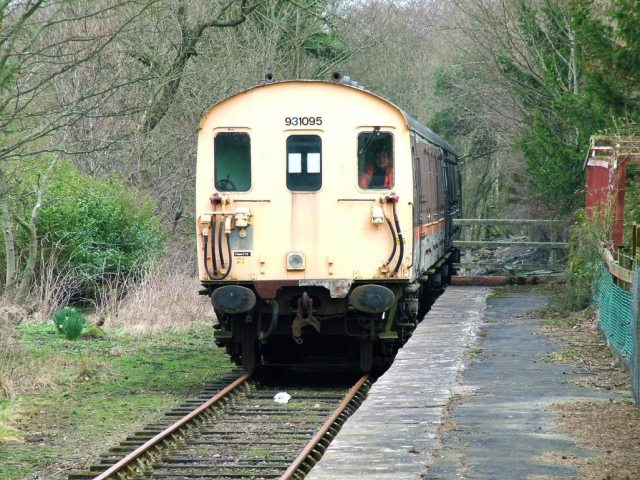
Battery powered former BR Class 419 750 V DC Motor Luggage Van at Warcop

The Eden Valley Railway has mostly ex-British Rail built rolling stock, including British Rail Class 205 diesel-electric multiple unit no. 205 009, British Rail Class 411 electric multiple units nos. 2311 and 2315 and British Rail Class 419 units nos. 9003, 9005 and 9010. The railway also has a Brush Traction Type 4 Class 47 diesel-electric locomotive, no. 47799, which sometimes hauled the British Royal Train from 1990 to 2004, during which time it was named Prince Henry. Also on site are several ex industrial shunters: Robert Stephenson & Hawthorn 8343 (0-6-0DH "Darlington"), Fowler 4220045 (0-4-0DH), Hunslet 2389 (0-4-0DM), Thomas Hill 130c (0-4-0DH) and Drewry Cars 2181 (0-4-0DM) in addition to a number of freight wagons and a 15-ton railway crane.
