= Little Musgrave =

Village in Cumbria, England

Coordinates: 54.512°N 2.371°W

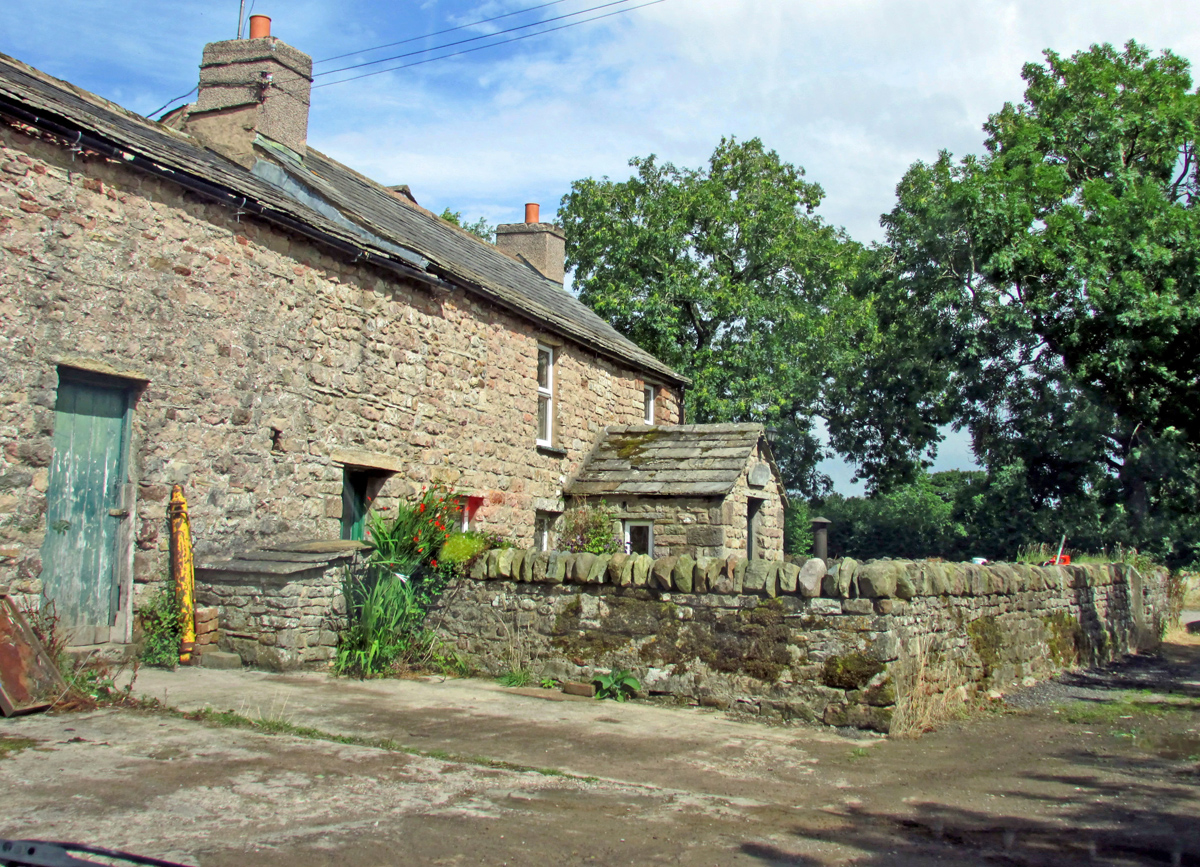
- Stone built farm buildings in Little Musgrave

- Location in Eden, Cumbria Location within Cumbria
- OS grid reference: NY759130
- Civil parish: Musgrave
- Unitary authority: Westmorland and Furness
- Ceremonial county: Cumbria
- Region: North West
- Country: England
- Sovereign state: United Kingdom
- Post town: KIRKBY STEPHEN
- Postcode district: CA17
- Dialling code: 017683
- Police: Cumbria
- Fire: Cumbria
- Ambulance: North West
- UK Parliament: Westmorland and Lonsdale

Little Musgrave is a small village and former civil parish, now in the parish of Musgrave, in the Westmorland and Furness district of Cumbria, England. In 1891 the parish had a population of 52.

== Location ==
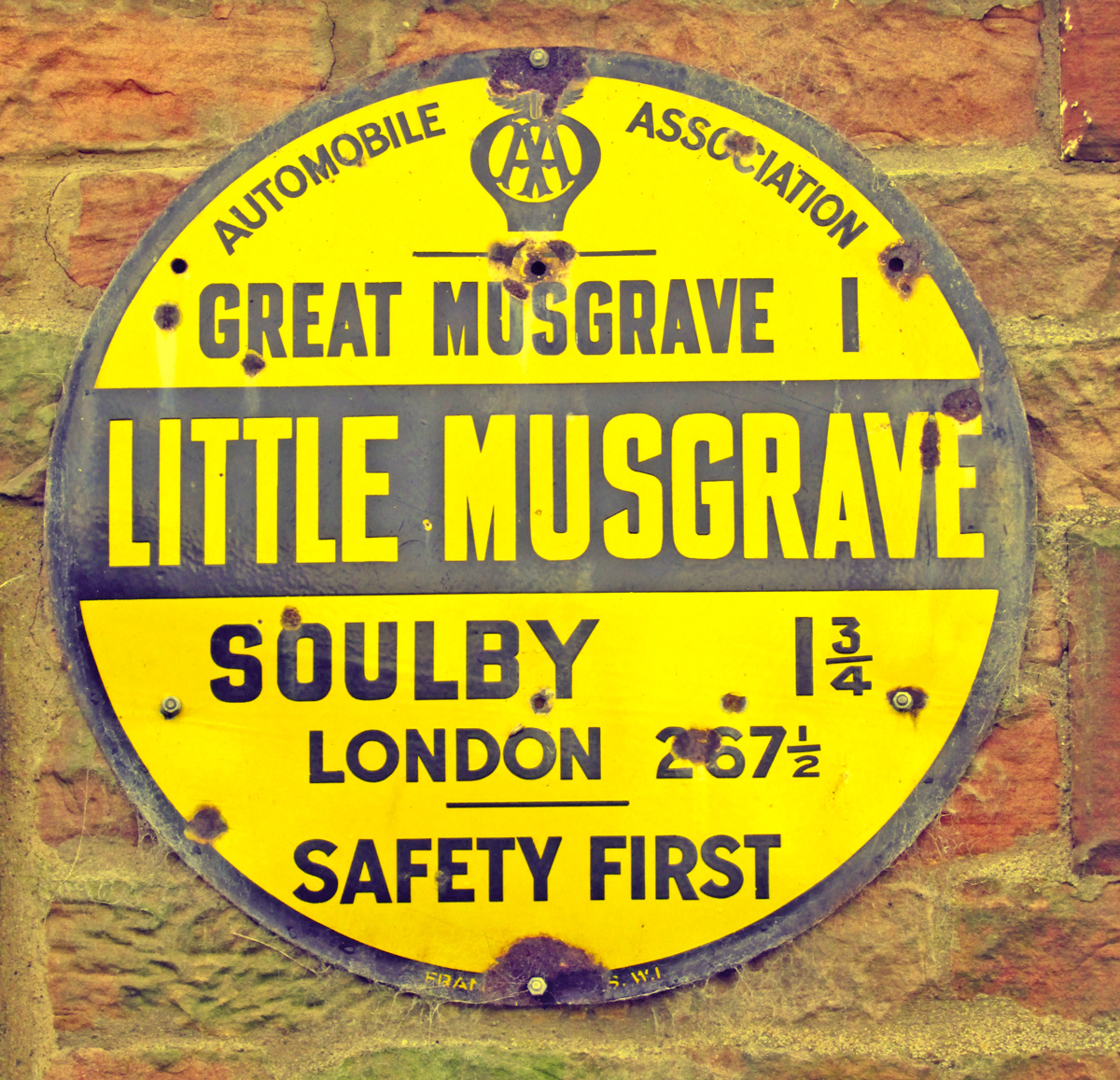
1930s AA road sign preserved on display in the village

The village is situated at 500 ft above sea level in the upper reaches of the Eden Valley just south of the Eden River and two and one-half miles west-south-west of Brough.

The village lies within the historic county of Westmorland.

== History ==
Little Musgrave was formerly a township in Crosby-Garret parish, from 1866 Little Musgrave was a civil parish in its own right until it was abolished on 30 December 1894 and merged with "Great Musgrave" to form "Musgrave".

== Notable residents ==
- William Edmundson (1627—1712), founder of the Quaker faith in Ireland.

== See also ==
- Listed buildings in Musgrave, Cumbria
- Musgrave railway station
