= Belah (disambiguation) =

Belah is a suburb of Carlisle, Cumbria, England.

Belah can also refer to:

- Bela (biblical figure) or Belah, a minor biblical figure
- Casuarina cristata, Australian tree known as belah
- Belah, New South Wales, a parish in Flinders County, New South Wales, Australia
- Belah, Queensland, a community in the Darling Downs area of Queensland, Australia
- Belah, Louisiana, a community near Jena, Louisiana, United States
- River Belah, Cumbria, England
- Belah Viaduct, a former railway viaduct over the above river

== See also ==
- Bela (disambiguation)
