= Barras railway station =

Disused railway station in Cumbria, England

Coordinates: 54.50308°N 2.24241°W

Barras
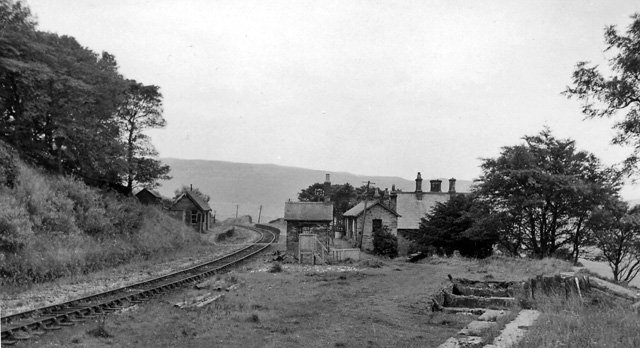
- Barras railway station in 1962

General information
- Location: Barras, Westmorland and Furness; England
- Platforms: 2

Other information
- Status: Disused

History
- Original company: South Durham and Lancashire Union Railway
- Pre-grouping: North Eastern Railway
- Post-grouping: London and North Eastern Railway

Key dates
- February 1862: Opened
- 22 January 1962: Closed
Location

Barras railway station was situated on the South Durham & Lancashire Union Railway between Barnard Castle and Kirkby Stephen East.

== History ==
The station was situated at an altitude of 1,100 feet (340 m) and was the highest station in England until Dent station on the nearby Settle and Carlisle Line was opened in 1877. The Stainmore Summit at 1,370 feet (420 m) lay 4 miles (6.4 km) to the east and the substantial Belah Viaduct was one mile to the southwest.

The station served the villages of Barras, Brough and North Stainmore. The line was opened on 26 March 1861 when a mineral train was run, the line opened to passengers on 8 August 1861 following an opening ceremony the day before, but Barras station is noted in the published timetable as having no trains stopping, it first appeared to be open for passengers from February 1862.

The station was host to a camping coach in 1935 and 1936 and possibly also in 1934.

The station was closed by British Railways North Eastern Region on 22 January 1962. Freight facilities had been withdrawn on 1 December 1952 and from that date it had been operated as an unstaffed halt for passengers only.

The main station buildings and a small goods yard and siding were constructed on the north side of the line, serving eastbound trains. There was a waiting shelter for passengers which was located on the westbound platform.

In July 2007, the up platform waiting room was removed brick by brick by Stainmore Railway Company volunteers. Materials were subsequently stored at Kirkby Stephen East station, and in 2015 began a new lease of life as part of the new water tower which was built at the railway's headquarters. This project also re-used stone from Mousegill Viaduct, which was in close proximity to Barras station on the South Durham & Lancashire Union Railway before being blown up as part of an Army training exercise in 1966.

== Services ==
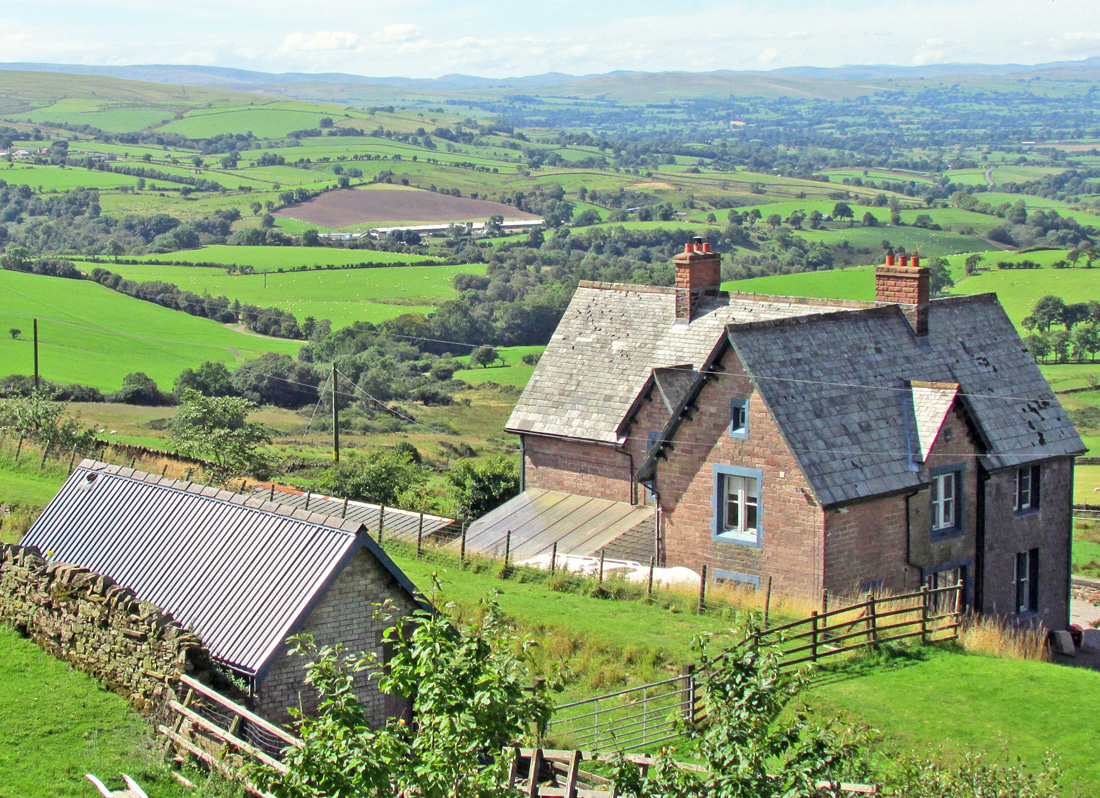
Barras station site in 2016 with the westbound waiting shelter in the foreground and station master's house beyond the lifted track bed

The British Railways North Eastern Region published passenger timetable for October 1950 showed that four trains called at the station in each direction on weekdays en route from Darlington to Kirkby Stephen.

Local freight trains also served the Barras goods yard and through freight trains from the northeast via Stainmore and Tebay to Barrow-in-Furness also passed through the station.

Heavy snow falls frequently interrupted operations on the Stainmore line. In February 1955 an eastbound steam locomotive and its goods train became stuck for four days in deep snow just north of the station. Its recovery was recorded in an official film Snowdrift at Bleath Gill.

== Bibliography ==
- Butt, R. V. J. (October 1995). The Directory of Railway Stations: details every public and private passenger station, halt, platform and stopping place, past and present (1st ed.). Sparkford: Patrick Stephens Ltd. ISBN 978-1-85260-508-7. OCLC 60251199. OL 11956311M.
- British Railways Pre-Grouping Atlas And Gazetteer. Ian Allan Publishing. 1997 [1958]. ISBN 0-7110-0320-3.
- McRae, Andrew (1997). British Railway Camping Coach Holidays: The 1930s & British Railways (London Midland Region). Vol. Scenes from the Past: 30 (Part One). Foxline. ISBN 1-870119-48-7.
- Quick, Michael (2022) [2001]. Railway passenger stations in Great Britain: a chronology (PDF). version 5.04. Railway & Canal Historical Society. Archived from the original (PDF) on 25 November 2022.
- Walton, Peter (1992). The Stainmore & Eden Valley Railways. Oxford Publishing Co. ISBN 0-86093-306-7.

Preceding station	Disused railways	Following station
Kirkby Stephen East	North Eastern Railway; South Durham & Lancashire Union Railway	Bowes
