= Barras, Cumbria =

Hamlet in Cumbria, England

Coordinates: 54.504°N 2.244°W

Barras
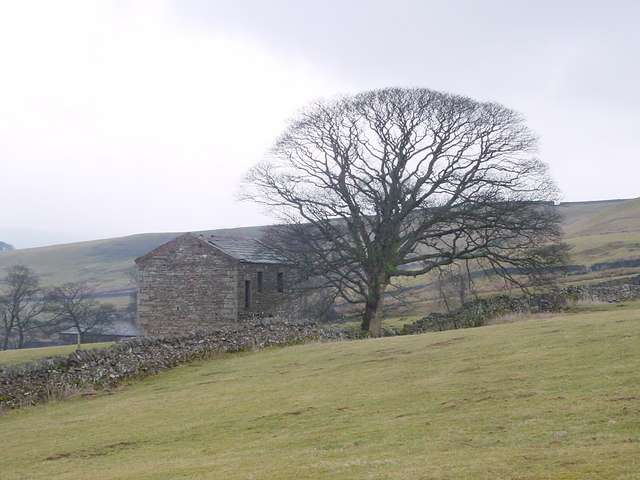
- Barn at Barras Farm

- Location in Eden, Cumbria Location within Cumbria
- OS grid reference: NY843120
- Civil parish: Stainmore
- Unitary authority: Westmorland and Furness
- Ceremonial county: Cumbria
- Region: North West
- Country: England
- Sovereign state: United Kingdom
- Post town: Kirkby Stephen
- Postcode district: CA17
- Dialling code: 01768
- Police: Cumbria
- Fire: Cumbria
- Ambulance: North West
- UK Parliament: Westmorland and Lonsdale

Barras is a hamlet close to the River Belah, about 4 miles (6 kilometres) south-east of Brough, Cumbria, England.

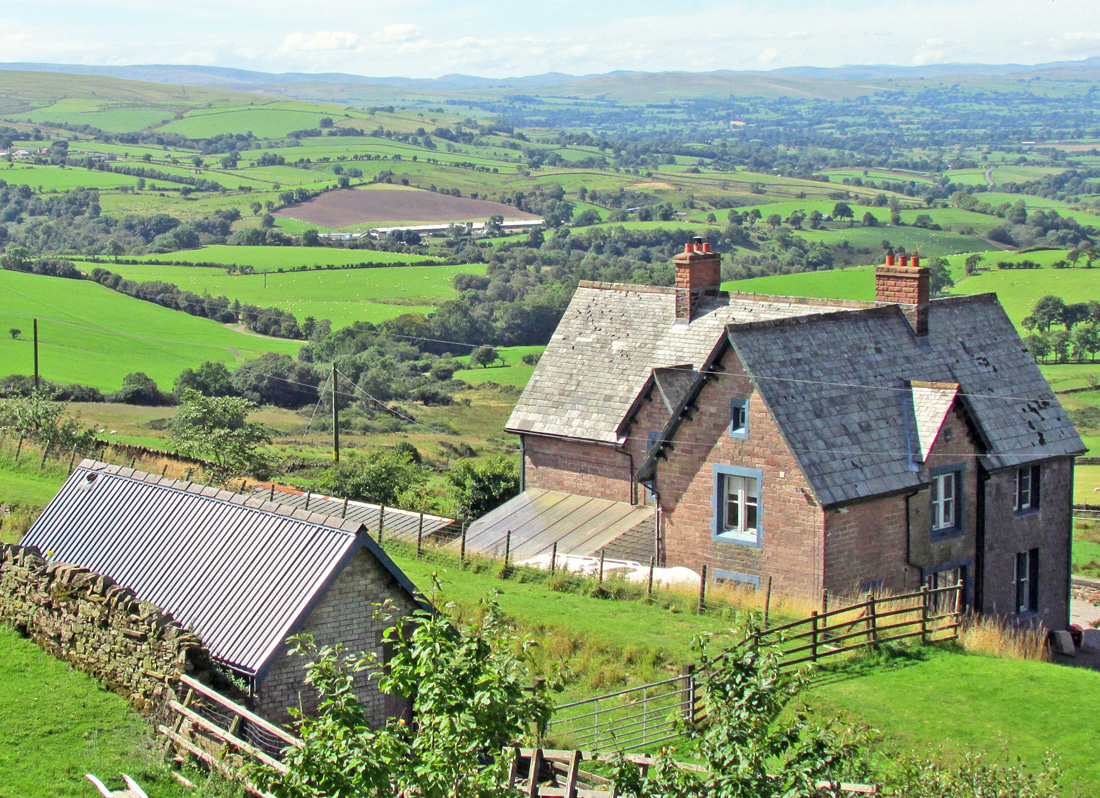
Barras railway station (closed) in 2016

Barras is situated at the eastern edge of the historic county of Westmorland.

The hamlet is located at approximately 1,100 feet (340 metres) above sea level.

From 1861 until 1962 it was served by Barras railway station on the Stainmore railway line between Kirkby Stephen and Barnard Castle.
