= Brough Sowerby =

Village and civil parish in Cumbria, England

Coordinates: 54.509°N 2.320°W

- Location within Cumbria
- Population: 137 (2011)
- OS grid reference: NY7912
- Civil parish: Brough Sowerby
- Unitary authority: Westmorland and Furness
- Ceremonial county: Cumbria
- Region: North West
- Country: England
- Sovereign state: United Kingdom
- Post town: KIRKBY STEPHEN
- Postcode district: CA17
- Dialling code: 01768
- Police: Cumbria
- Fire: Cumbria
- Ambulance: North West
- UK Parliament: Westmorland and Lonsdale

Brough Sowerby is a village and civil parish in the Westmorland and Furness district of Cumbria, England. It is located 22.3 miles southeast of the town of Penrith. According to the 2001 census it had a population of 127, increasing to 137 at the 2011 Census. The village is near the River Belah. 'A township in Brough parish, Westmoreland; 1½ mile S of Brough. Acres, 1,083. Real property with Kaber, £3,664. Pop., 140. Houses, 32.' There are quite a few Black Bull inns in the area surrounding Brough Sowerby, this comes from the old Scottish black cattle that were driven through the market town of Kirkby Stephen.

== Toponymy ==
The areas in Lancashire are recorded as "Sorbi" and "Sourebi" in the Domesday Book of 1086, and the ones in Yorkshire as "Sorebi", which is also in the Domesday Book. These places share the same meaning and derive from the same place, which is "the farm or village in marshy ground", from the Old Norse "saurr", mud, sour ground, with "byr", farm, settlement.

== Population ==
In 1801 the population was at 139, rising to a peak of 180 in 1821. The population fluctuated between 155 and 128 throughout the rest of the 19th century and between 78 (in 1971) and 127 (in 2001) during the 20th century.

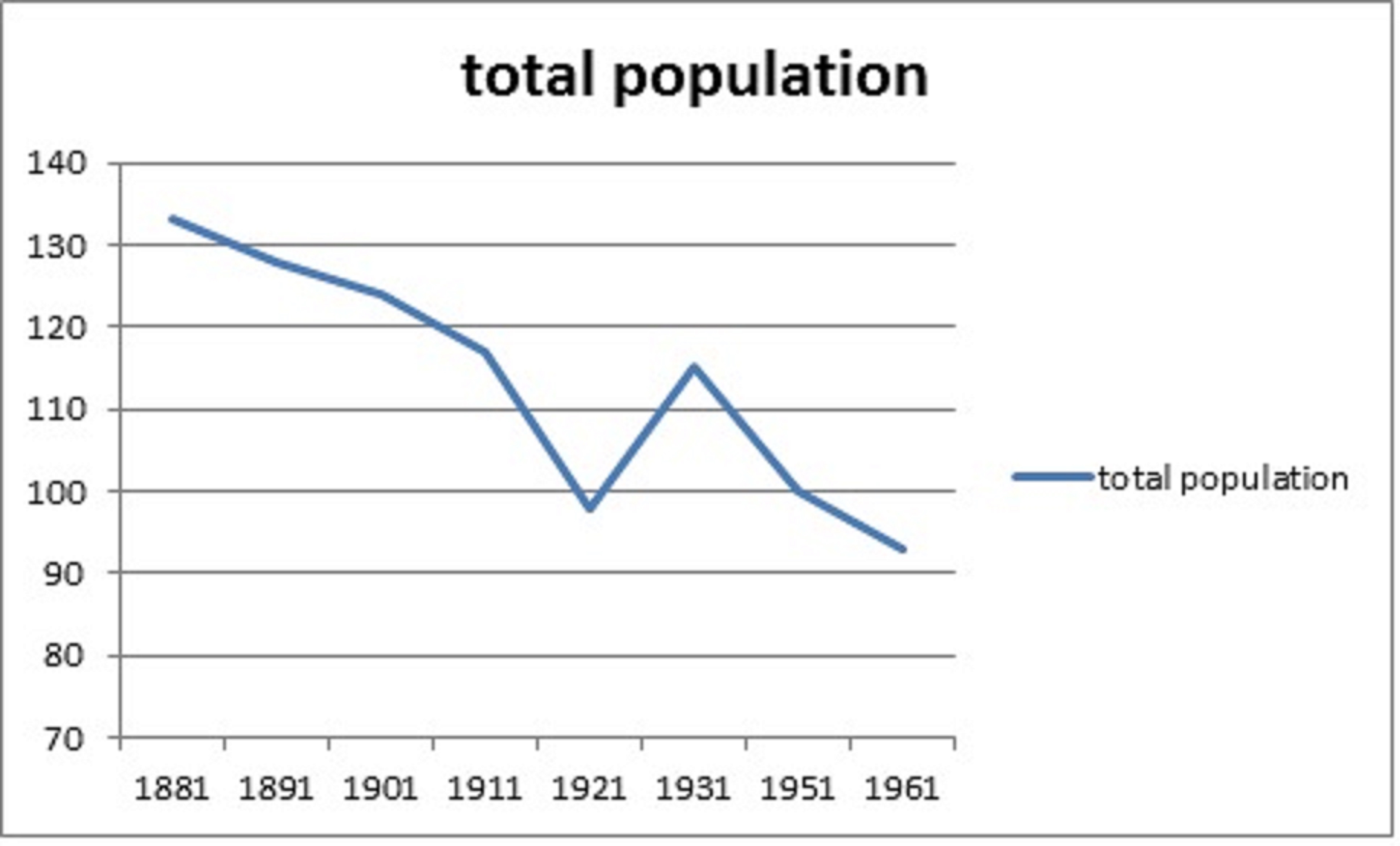
Population change from 1881-1961

== Industry and economic activity ==
In the earliest census of 1801 the population was clearly in the categories 'chiefly employed in agriculture', those 'chiefly employed in trade, manufacturers or handicraft', and others. A medieval corn mill, Joiners and wheelright, a clogger and a blacksmith were recorded in 1829. In the 21st century, the main occupations are farming, building and vegetable oil refining. Coaching inn, the Black Bull, was recorded in 1810; still there today in 2012. There are surprisingly many businesses currently located in Brough sowerby for such a small village. Most notably the disposal of waste oil is a service which is provided in Brough Sowerby by Bay oils Ltd, who are a family run company who have been working within the oil industry for over 25 years.

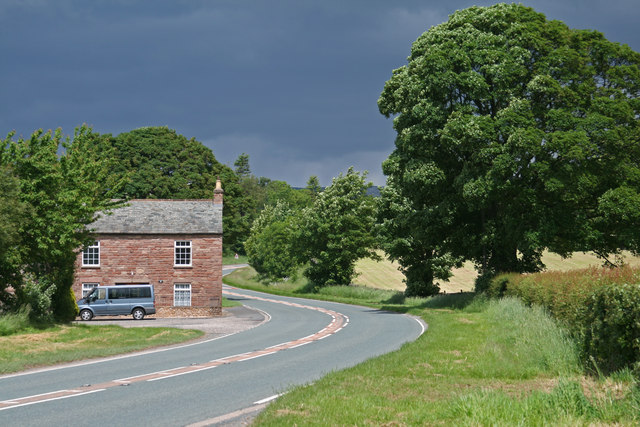
Local building

== Land ownership ==
It is part of the Westmorland or Appleby barony. Brough Sowerby was held successively by the Vetriponts, the Cliffords, and the earls of Thanet. The Wharton family started to accumulate freehold in Sowerby in late Tudor times. In 1747, the Lowther estate bought these holdings from the trustees of the Duke of Wharton. Mrs. Ewbanke, William Cleasby, of Kirkby Stephen; Christopher Bousfield, Thomas Davis, John Waistell, of Appleby, and several other small owners are the principal landowners.

== Housing needs ==
In September 2009 the Cumbria Rural Housing Trust who are commissioned by the Eden District Council, conducted various Housing Needs Surveys across the parishes of the Upper Eden area with the purpose of identifying the need for affordable housing. The information received from the survey responses from the Brough Sowerby Parish show that 7.69% of the responses said that either the whole household or someone living within the household, wished to move within the parish in the next 5 years but the housing is not available.

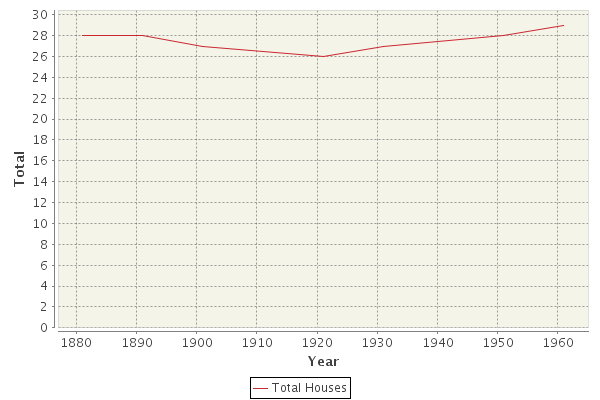
Total number of houses between 1881-1961
