= Tay Bridge =

Railway bridge across the River Tay, Scotland

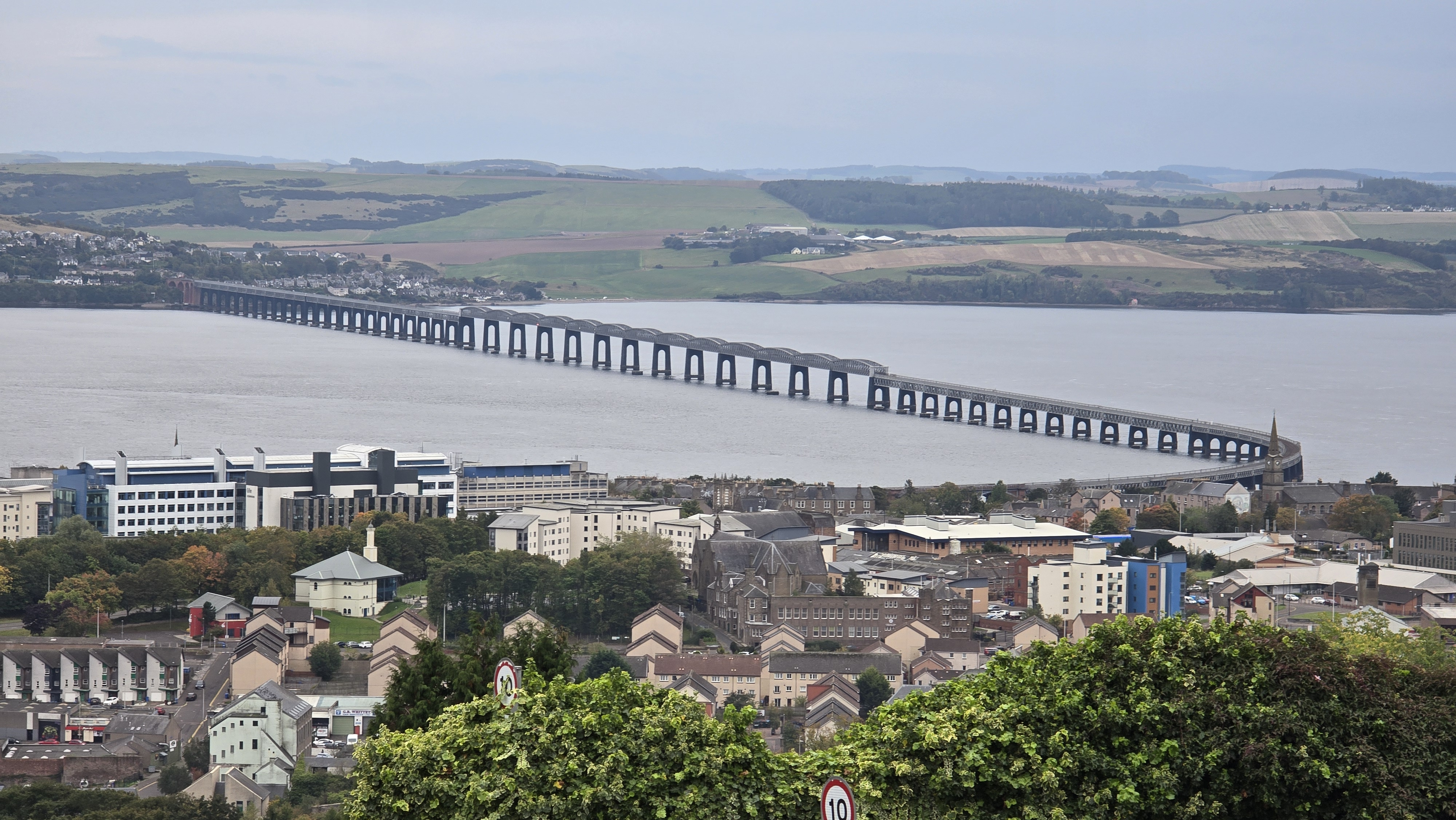
- Tay Bridge at Dundee, Scotland, seen from the Dundee Law hill
- Coordinates: 56.43889°N 2.98858°W
- OS grid reference: NO 39143 27850
- Crosses: Firth of Tay
- Locale: Dundee

Characteristics
- Total length: 10,711 feet (2.0286 mi; 3,265 m)

History
- Construction start: 22 July 1871 (1st); 6 July 1883 (2nd)
- Construction end: Early 1878 (1st); 1887 (2nd)
- Opened: 1 June 1878 (1st); 20 June 1887 (2nd)
- Closed: 28 December 1879 (1st)

Listed Building – Category A
- Official name: Tay Railway Bridge
- Designated: 29 June 1989
- Reference no.: LB25681

Location
- Interactive map of Tay Bridge

The Tay Bridge carries rail traffic across the Firth of Tay in Scotland between Dundee and the suburb of Wormit in Fife. Its span is 10,711 feet (2.0286 miles; 3,265 metres). It is the second bridge to occupy the site.

Plans for a bridge over the Tay to replace the train ferry service emerged in 1854, but the first Tay Bridge did not open until 1878. It was a lightweight lattice design of relatively low cost with a single track. On 28 December 1879, the bridge suddenly collapsed in high winds while a train was crossing, killing everybody on board. The incident is one of the worst bridge-related engineering disasters in history. An enquiry determined that the bridge was insufficiently engineered to cope with high winds.

It was replaced by a second bridge constructed of iron and steel, with a double track, parallel to the remains of the first bridge. Work commenced on 6 July 1883 and the bridge opened in 1887. The new bridge was subject to extensive testing by the Board of Trade, which resulted in a favourable report. In 2003, the bridge was strengthened and refurbished, winning a British Construction Industry Engineering Award to mark the scale and difficulty of the project.

== First bridge ==
=== Origins and concept ===
Proposals to build a bridge across the Tay date to 1854 but it was not until 15 July 1870 that the North British Railway (Tay Bridge and Railways) Act 1870 (33 & 34 Vict. c. cxxxv) received royal assent. On 22 July 1871, the foundation stone of the bridge was laid.

The bridge was designed by engineer Thomas Bouch, who received a knighthood following the bridge's completion. The bridge was a lattice-grid design, combining cast and wrought iron. The design had been used by Thomas W. Kennard in the Crumlin Viaduct in South Wales in 1858, after the use of cast iron in the Crystal Palace. The Crystal Palace was not as heavily loaded as a railway bridge. An earlier cast-iron design, the Dee bridge collapsed in 1847, having failed because of poor use of cast-iron girders. Gustave Eiffel used a similar design to create several large viaducts in the Massif Central in 1867.

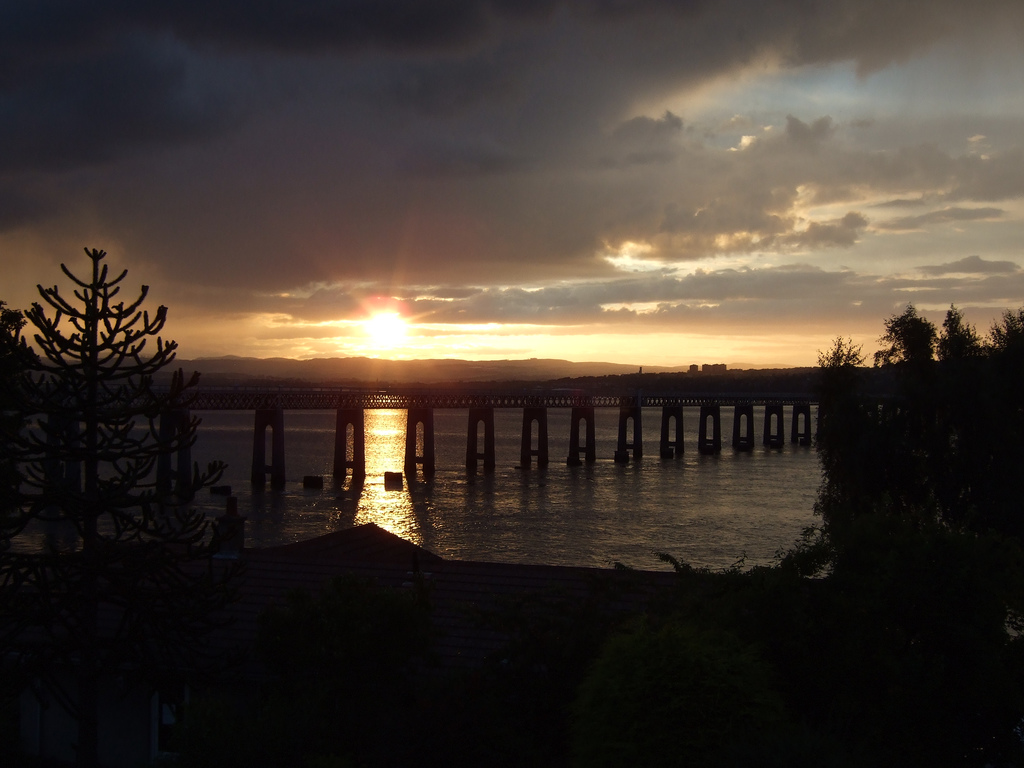
At dusk. One of the stumps of the original bridge is silhouetted against the sunlit Firth.

The original design was for lattice girders supported by brick piers resting on the bedrock, shown by trial borings to lie at no great depth under the river. At either end of the bridge, the single track ran on top of the bridge girder, most of which lay below the pier tops. At the centre section of the bridge (the high girders), the railway ran inside the bridge girder, which was above the pier tops to give clearance for the passage of sailing ships. To accommodate thermal expansion, there were non-rigid connections between girders and piers.

As the bridge extended out into the river, by December 1873, it became clear that the bedrock lay much deeper, too deep to act as a foundation for the bridge piers. Bouch redesigned the bridge to reduce the number of piers and increase the span of the girders. The pier foundations were no longer resting on bedrock; instead they were constructed by sinking brick-lined wrought-iron caissons onto the riverbed, removing sand until they rested on the consolidated gravel layer which had been misreported as rock, and then filling the caissons with concrete.

To reduce the weight that the ground underneath the caissons would have to support, the brick piers were replaced by open lattice iron skeleton piers. Each pier had multiple cast-iron columns taking the weight of the bridging girders, with wrought iron horizontal braces and diagonal tiebars linking the columns to give rigidity and stability. The basic concept was well known, having been used by Kennard in the Crumlin Viaduct in South Wales in 1858. Bouch had used the technique for viaducts, including the Belah Viaduct (1860) on the South Durham & Lancashire Union Railway line over Stainmore, but for the Tay Bridge, even with the largest practicable caissons, the pier dimensions were constrained by their size. Bouch's pier design set six columns in a hexagon maximising the pier width but not the number of diagonal braces directly resisting sideways forces.

Structure	Crumlin viaduct	Belah viaduct	Tay Bridge
Engineer (year of opening)	Kennard (1858)	Bouch (1860)	Bouch (1878)
Single span	120 ft (36.6 m)	60 ft (18.3 m)	245 ft (74.7 m))
Pier height	170 ft (51.8 m)	180 ft (54.9 m)	83 ft (25.3 m)
Pier width at top	30 ft (9.1 m)	22 ft (6.7 m)	19 ft 10 in (6.05 m)
Pier width at base	60 ft (18.3 m)	48 ft (14.6 m)	21 ft 10 in (6.65 m)
Columns per pier	14 (1-3-3-3-3-1)	6 (2-2-2)	6 (1-2-2-1)
Sections per column	10	11	7
Diagonal tiebars giving lateral bracing (per pier)	180	88	28
Fate	Demolished 1966-7	Demolished 1963	Failed in service 1879

=== Design details ===
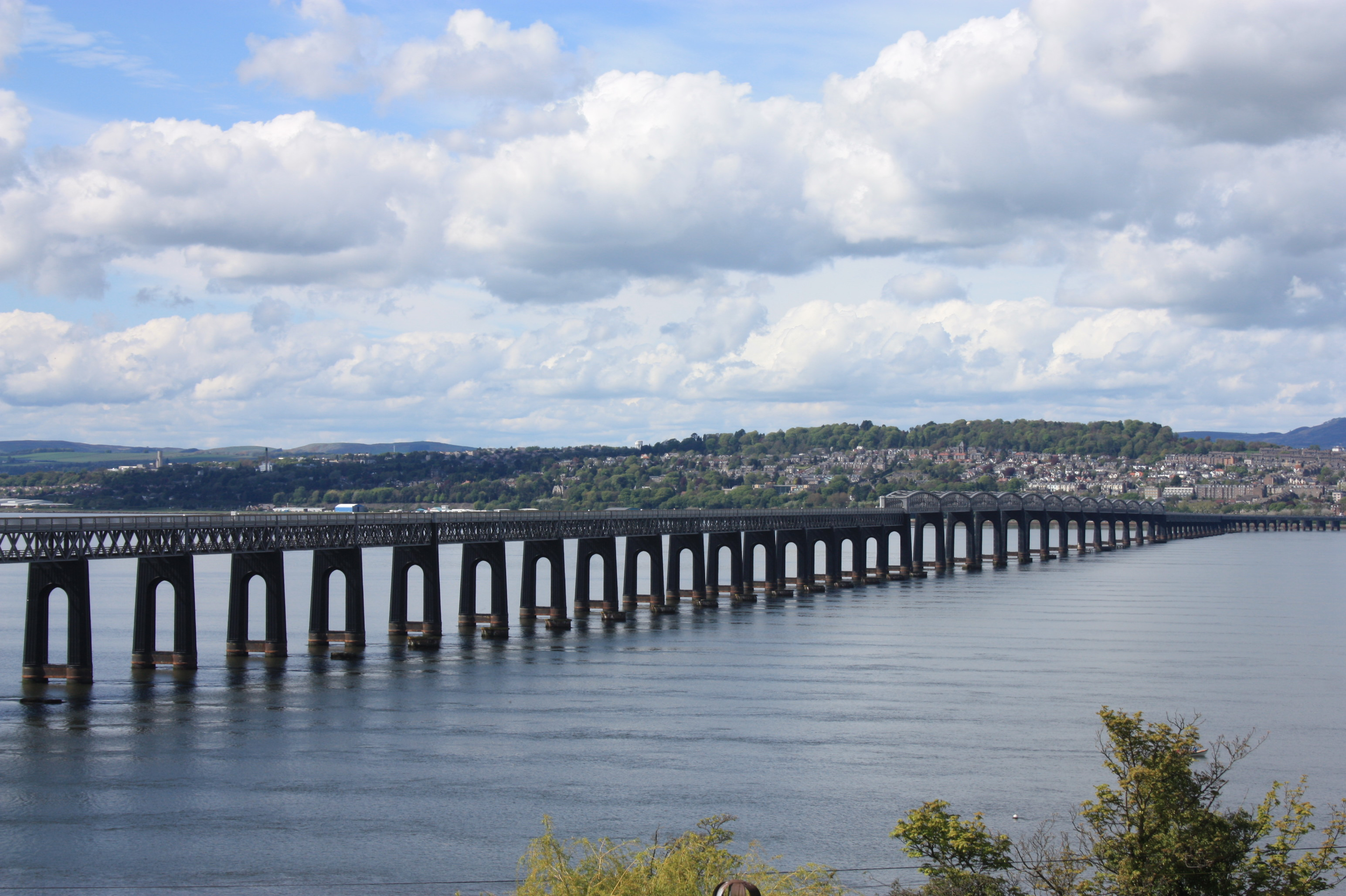
The second (current) Tay Rail Bridge from Wormit on the south bank

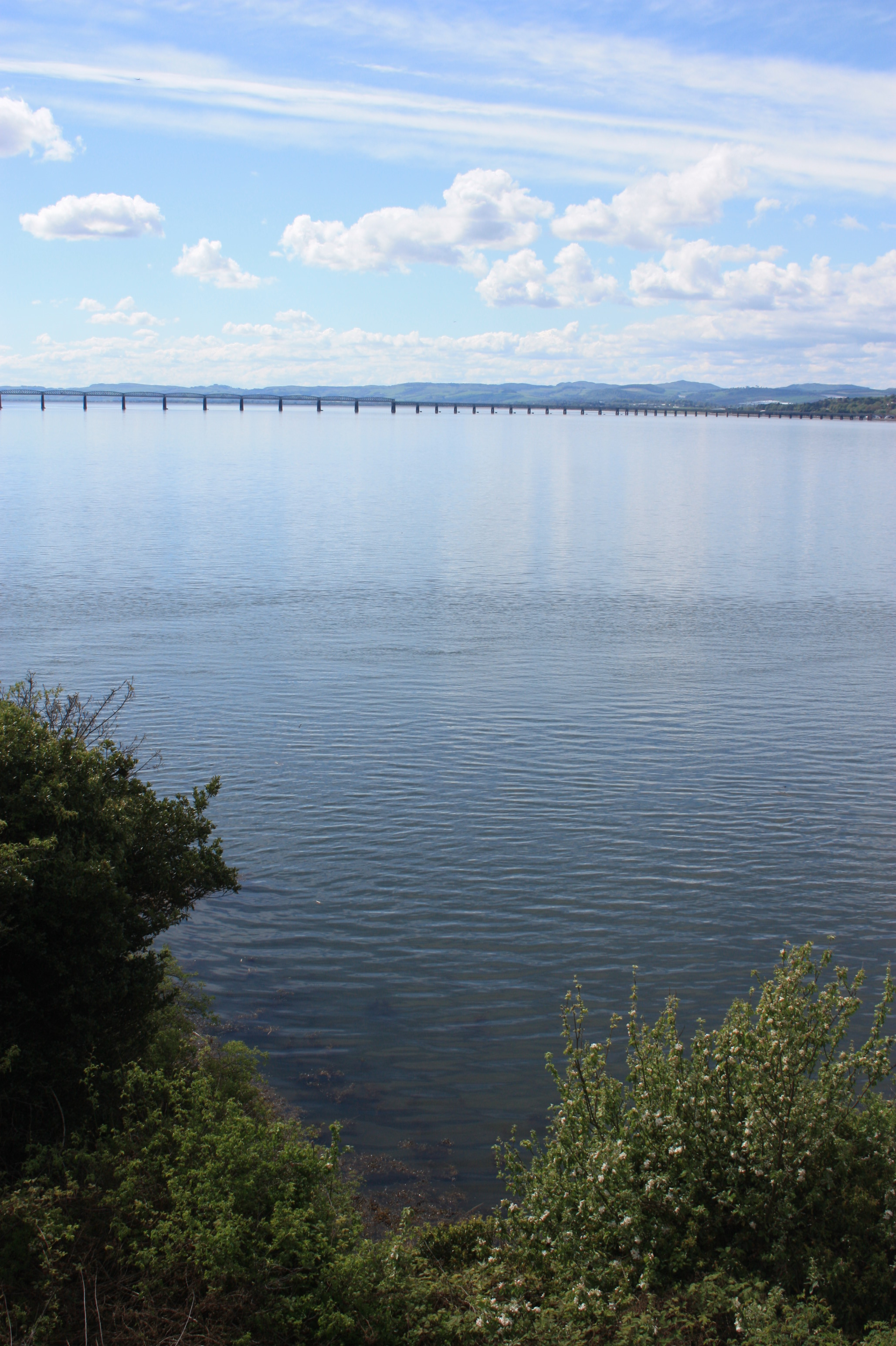
The current Tay Rail Bridge as seen across the Tay Estuary from Newport-on-Tay

The engineering details on the Tay Bridge were considerably simpler, lighter, and cheaper than on the earlier viaducts. The machined base of each column section docked securely into a machined enlarged section of the top of the section below. The joint was then secured by bolts through matching holes on lugs (Crumlin) or flanges (Belah) on the two sections. This 'spigot and faucet' configuration was used, apparently without machining, on some Tay Bridge pier columns, but on some the bolts were relied upon to ensure correct alignment. In the event, the joints were made using undersized bolts, of a smaller diameter than that which would just go through the hole. This made assembling the column easier, as the bolt holes would not need to align exactly before inserting the bolt. However, this allowed the two members, so joined, to move relative to each other under load, weakening the column.

On the Tay Bridge the diagonal bracing was by means of flat bars running from the top of one column-section diagonally down to the bottom of the adjacent column section. The top connection was to a lug that was an integral part of the column casting. The bottom connection was to two sling plates bolted to the base of the equivalent section on an adjacent column. The bar and sling plates all had matching longitudinal slots in them. The tie bar was placed between the sling plates with all three slots aligned and overlapping. A gib was driven through all three slots and secured. Two cotters, metal wedges, were then positioned to fill the rest of the slot overlap, and driven in hard to put the tie under tension. Horizontal bracing was provided by wrought iron channel iron. The various bolt heads were too close to each other, and to the column for easy tightening up with spanners; this coupled with lack of precision in the preparation of the channel iron braces led to various on site fitting expedients (one of them described by a witness to the enquiry as "about as slovenly a piece of work as ever I saw in my life".

On the Crumlin and Belah Viaducts, however, horizontal bracing was provided by substantial fitted cast-iron girders securely attached to the columns, with the diagonal braces then being attached to the girders. The chairman of the Court of Inquiry quoted at length from a contemporary book praising the detailed engineering of the Belah viaduct piers, and describing the viaduct as one of the lightest and cheapest of the kind that had ever been erected.

... It is a distinguishing feature in this viaduct that the cross, or distance girders of the piers encircle the columns, which are turned up at that point, the girders being bored out to fit the turned part with great accuracy. No cement of any kind was used in the whole structure, and the piers when completed, and the vertical and horizontal wrought-iron bracings keyed up, are nearly as rigid as though they were one solid piece...

.... The fitting was all done by machines, which were specially designed for the purpose, and finished the work with mathematical accuracy The flanges of the column were all faced up and their edges turned, and every column was stepped into the one below it with a lip of about 5/8 of an inch in depth, the lip and socket for it being actually turned and bored. That portion of the column against which the cross girders rested was also turned. The whole of these operations were performed at one time, the column being centred in a hollow mandril-lathe. After being turned the columns passed on to a drilling machine, in which all the holes in each flange were drilled out of the solid simultaneously. And as this was done with them all in the same machine, the holes of course, perfectly coincided when the columns were placed one on the other in the progress of erection. Similar care was taken with the cross-girders, which were bored out at the ends by machines designed for that purpose. Thus, when the pieces of the viaduct had to be put together at the place of erection there was literally not a tool required, and neither chipping or filing to retard the progress of the work.

Either, said the chairman, the Belah viaduct had been over-engineered, or the Tay Bridge had been under engineered.

=== Construction ===
Whilst Bouch was in the process of revising his design, the company which had been awarded the contract for the bridge's construction, Messrs De Bergue of Cardiff, went out of business. During June 1874, a replacement contract for the work was issued to Hopkin Gilkes and Company, successors to the Middlesbrough company which had previously provided the ironwork for the Belah viaduct. Gilkes had originally intended to produce all the bridge ironwork on Teesside, but in the event continued to use a foundry at Wormit to produce the cast-iron components, and to carry out limited post-casting machining operations.

The change in design increased cost and necessitated delay, intensified after two of the high girders fell when being lifted into place during the night of Friday, 3 February 1877.

The fallen girders had to be removed and new ones built. and the piers to be erected again; and this threatened seriously to interfere with the expectation of having the bridge finished for the passage of a train by September. Only eight months were now available for the erection and floating out of six, and the lifting of ten 245-foot [75 m] spans. Five and seven respectively of the 145-foot [44 m] spans had yet to go through the same process. Seven large and three small piers had yet to be built. The weight of iron which had to be put in its place was 2,700 long tons [3,000 short tons], and it seemed incredible that all this could be done in eight months. A good deal would depend on the weather but this was far from favourable.

Despite this the first engine crossed the bridge on 22 September 1877, and upon its completion in early 1878 the Tay Bridge was the longest in the world. While visiting the city, Ulysses S. Grant commented that it was "a big bridge for a small city".

=== Inspection and opening ===
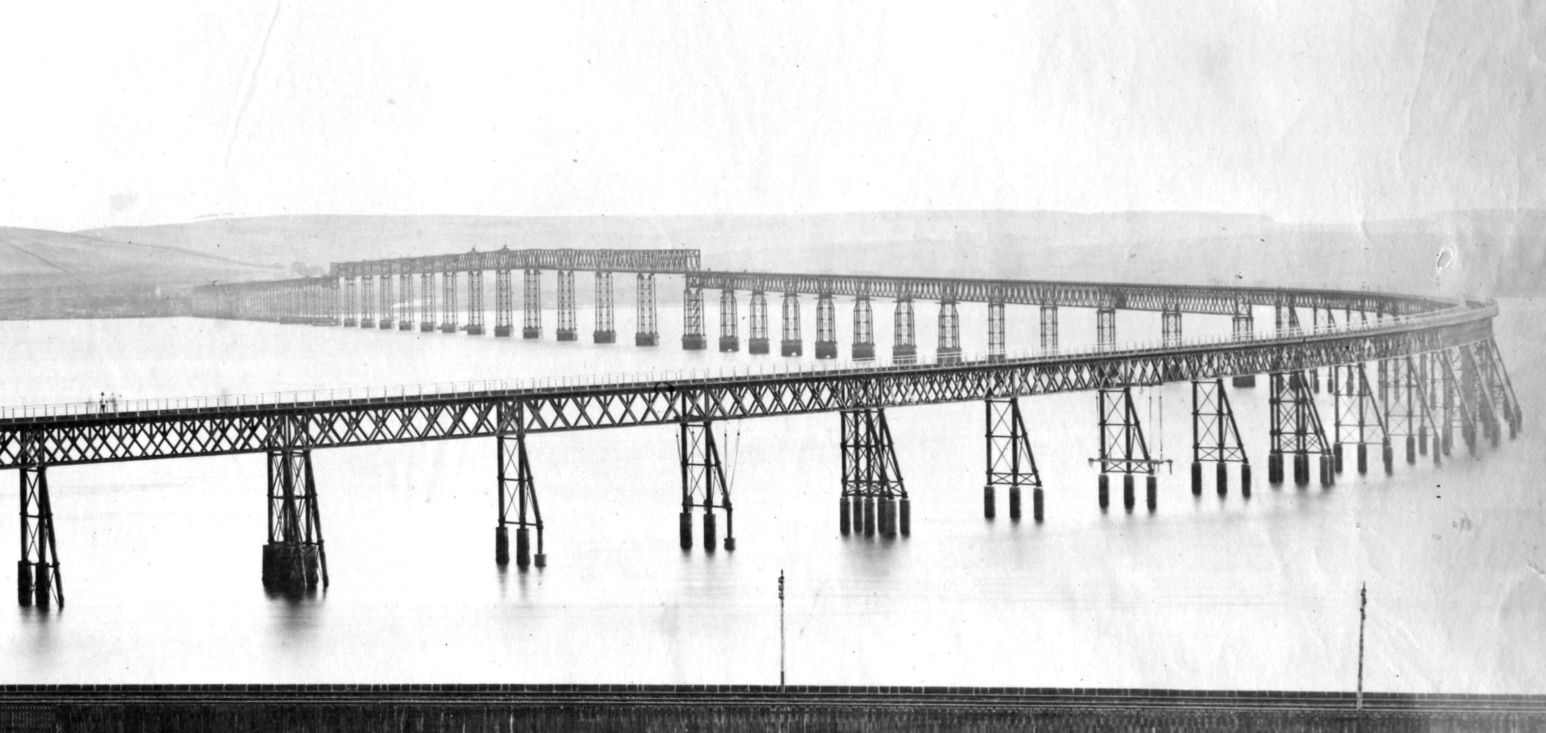
The original Tay Bridge before the 1879 collapse

Like all UK rail lines, the Tay Bridge was subject to a Board of Trade inspection before it could carry passenger trains. The inspection was conducted 25–27 February 1878 by Major General Hutchinson of the Railway Inspectorate, who measured the deflection of the 245 ft (75 m) bridge girders under a distributed load of 1.5 tons per foot (5 t/m) due to heavy locomotives, travelling at up to 40 mph (64 km/h), as less than 2 inches (51 mm). He reported that "these results are in my opinion to be regarded as satisfactory. The lateral oscillation [roughly, rhythmic side-to-side movement], as observed by the theodolite when the engines ran over at speed, was slight and the structure overall showed great stiffness".

Hutchinson did require some minor remedial work to be performed, and also issued a "recommendation" to impose a 25 mph (40 km/h) speed limit on traffic passing over the bridge. Subsequently, Hutchinson explained to the inquiry that he had suggested this speed limit because of the minimal taper on the piers. The inspection report added: "When again visiting the spot I should wish, if possible, to have an opportunity of observing the effects of high wind when a train of carriages is running over the bridge".

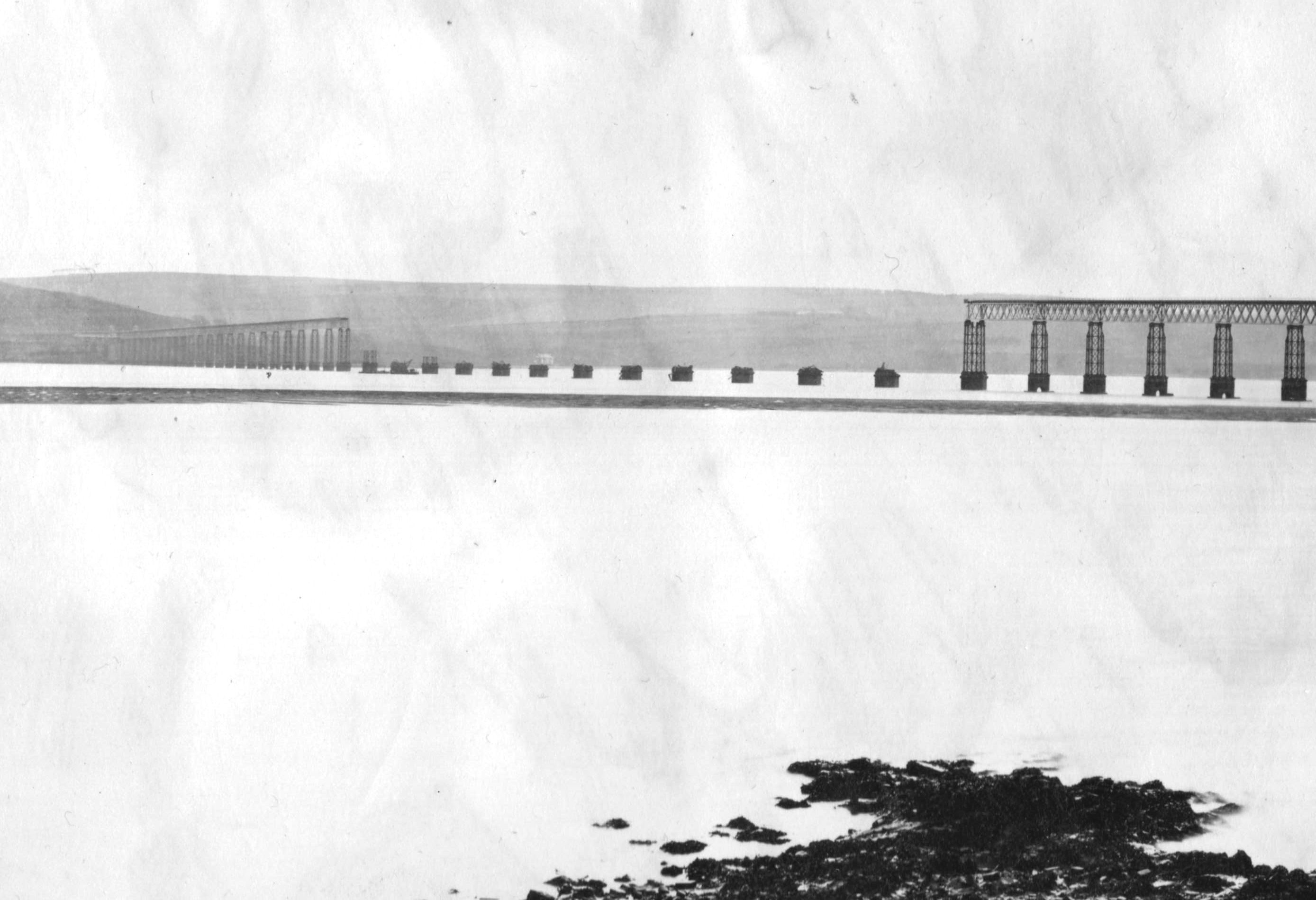
Tay bridge following the collapse

On 1 June 1878, the Tay Bridge was opened for passenger traffic, with formal opening ceremonies having taken place during the previous day, in the course of which Thomas Bouch was made a burgess of Dundee "in respect of his meritorious services as engineer of the bridge. ..." On 20 June 1879, Queen Victoria crossed the bridge during her return south from staying at Balmoral; Bouch was presented to her before she did so. On 26 June 1879, he was knighted by the Queen at Windsor Castle.

=== Catastrophic failure ===
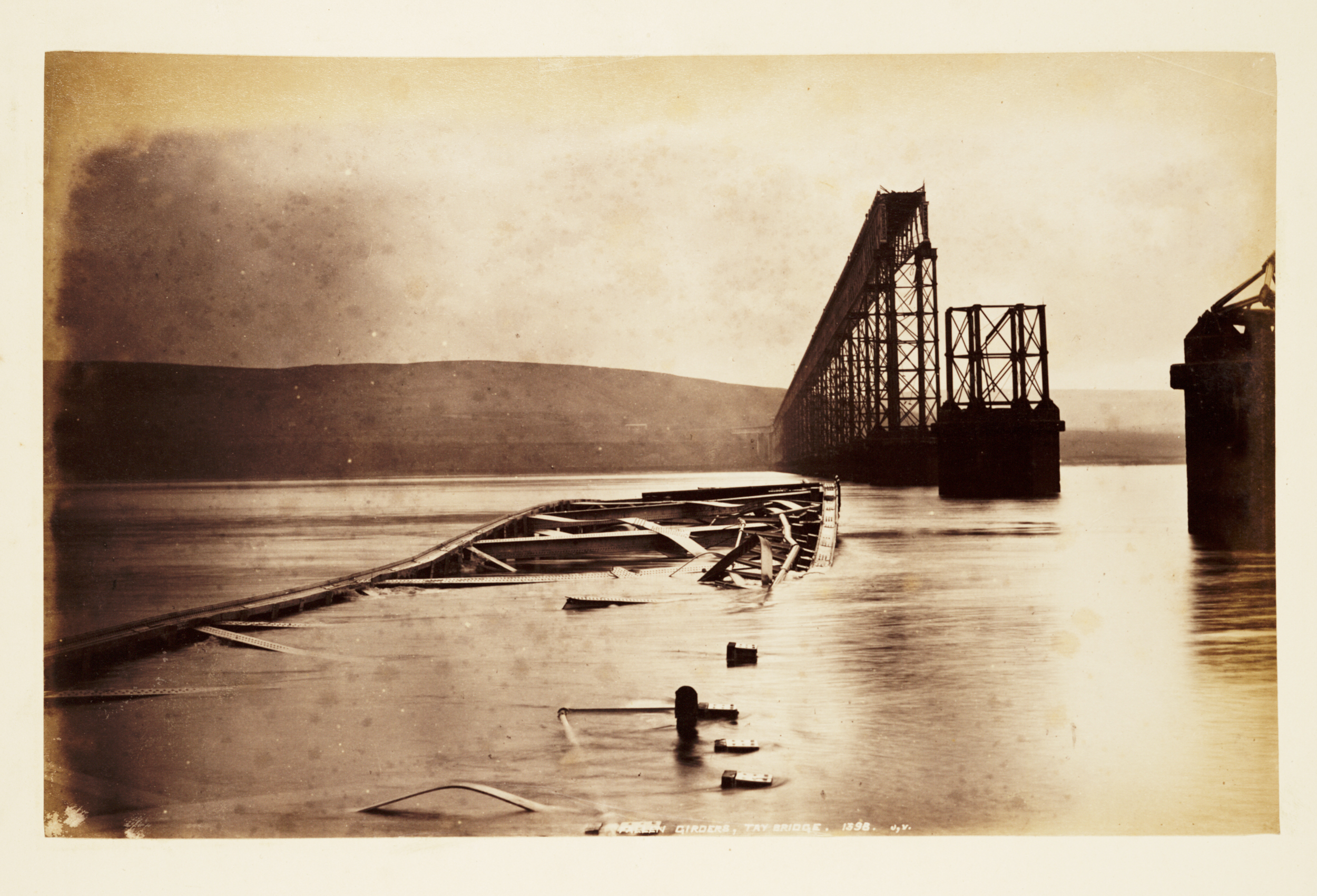
Fallen girders near the Tay Bridge

On the night of 28 December 1879 at 7:15 p.m., the bridge collapsed after its central spans gave way during high winter gales. A train with six carriages carrying seventy-five passengers and crew, crossing at the time of the collapse, plunged into the icy waters of the Tay. All seventy-five people on board were killed. The disaster stunned the whole country and sent shock waves through the Victorian engineering community. The ensuing enquiry revealed that the design of the bridge had not accommodated for high winds. At the time of the collapse, a gale estimated at force ten or eleven (Tropical Storm force winds: 55–72 mph (89–116 km/h) had been blowing down the Tay estuary at right angles to the bridge. The train engine (North British Railway no. 224) was salvaged from the river and subsequently restored for service on the railway. It gained the nickname "The Diver" as a result of its accident and difficult recovery.

The collapse of the bridge, despite opening only nineteen months earlier after being found safe by the Board of Trade, had a long-term effect on wider society. According to some commenters, it is still regarded as having been the most notorious bridge disaster to have ever occurred in the British Isles. The disaster was commemorated in "The Tay Bridge Disaster", one of the best-known verse efforts of William McGonagall. Today, the stumps of the original bridge piers are still visible above the surface of the Tay even at high tide.

In 2005, Scottish playwright Mike Gibb and composer Mairi Paton premiered their musical titled Five Pound and Twa Bairns in Dundee. It focuses on three fictional women from very different backgrounds who lose men in the disaster. The musical has had several further productions, including three separate sold-out runs at Dundee Rep Theatre.

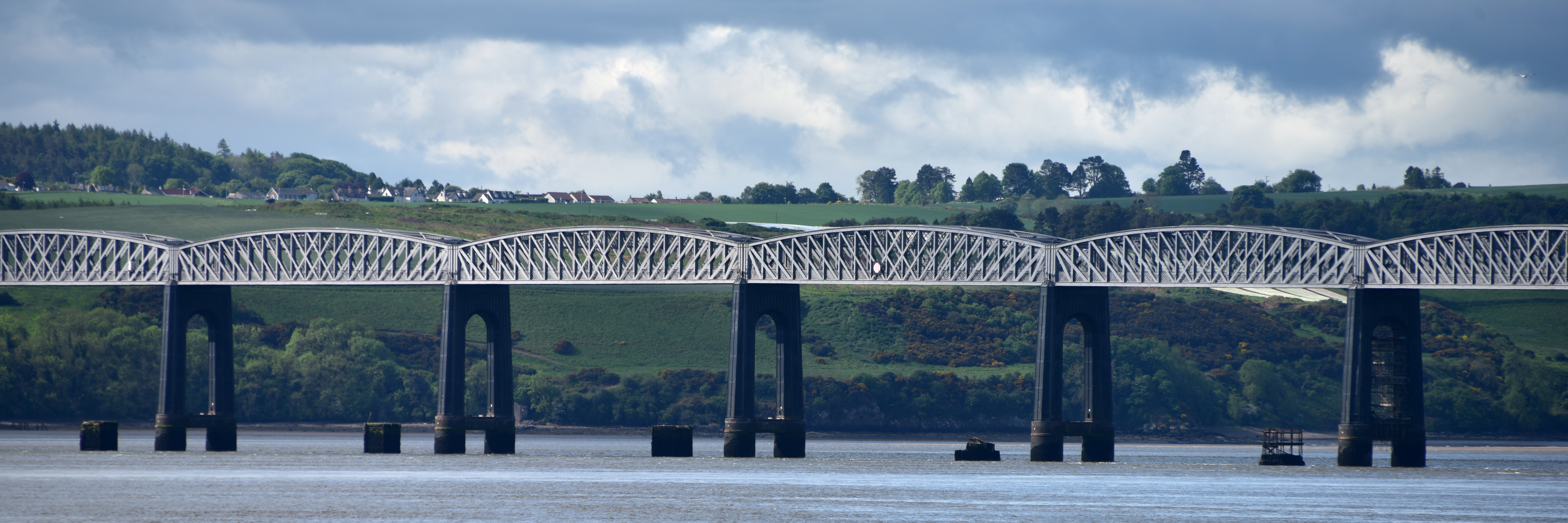
Northern segment of the second Tay Bridge, showing stumps of the original bridge's piers poking above the Tay

== Second bridge ==
=== Proposals ===
Almost immediately following the Tay Bridge failure, the North British Railway company began to develop plans for its reconstruction or replacement. During 1880, barely six months after the accident, the North British Railway (Tay Bridge) Bill for a construction of a new bridge was submitted to Parliament. The bill was reviewed by a special committee, chaired by Sir Lopes Massey Lopes, 3rd Baronet; Lopes drew attention to the substantial pressure for safety factors to be considered in light of the loss of the earlier bridge, including the need to examine the suitability of the location. In response to this inquiry, Mr Walker, the general manager of the North British Railway, stated his opinion that there was no more suitable site than what had been chosen, emphasising the relatively large interchange of traffic in the area and the importance of making the line as direct as practically possible. Additionally, a number of local witnesses, who included several leading merchants from Dundee, spoke favourably of the proposed location.

Plans for the reconstructed bridge were submitted by civil engineer Sir James Brunlees. His proposed design would have involved doubling the piers of the first bridge by installing the new columns on the east side of each of the existing piers, while arched brickwork would have been used to join the old and new elements alike. On top of these foundations, a brick decking would be laid that was wide enough to carry two sets of girders as well as a double-track layout. Brunlees proposed that the permanent way should be laid on the upper booms of the girders. The addition of bowstring girders, positioned 20 feet (6.1 m) high over the fairway, was considered to have much less exposure to the wind and greater lateral stiffness than the girders of the first bridge. The girders would also have been doubled, to be capable of resisting 200 pounds (91 kg) to the square foot of wind pressure, while the piers as designed were to be capable of resisting a pressure of 900 lb per square foot. Overall, Brunlees' proposed structure would have possessed greater strength for resisting lateral pressure over the original. This proposal had an estimated total cost of £356,323. While it was carefully considered, the Board of Trade regarded the practice of connecting the old bridge to a new design to be dangerous. It rejected both the proposed design and the overall bill.

North British Railway (New Tay Viaduct) Act 1881
- Act of Parliament
- Parliament of the United Kingdom
- Long title: An Act to provide for the restoration of the Railway communication across the Tay, near Dundee; and for other purposes.
- Citation: 44 & 45 Vict. c. cxxxvii

Dates
- Royal assent: 18 July 1881

Text of statute as originally enacted

The North British Railway, placing great importance on the connection between Fife and Forfarshire, was committed to developing a viable design. During August 1880, the noted railway engineer William Henry Barlow, of Barlow & Sons, London, was consulted on the matter. Following experiments upon the first bridge's remains, Barlow gave his opinion that the intact portions should be abandoned in favour of a new structure spanning between the two shores. Adopting this as the basis of their next submission, a new bill was raised and put before a select committee of the House of Commons on 10 May 1881. With little alteration or suggestions issued, this was soon passed, becoming the North British Railway (New Tay Viaduct) Act 1881 (44 & 45 Vict. c. cxxxvii). During November 1881, a contract for the new bridge's construction was awarded to Messrs William Arrol & Co of Glasgow. For the new bridge's design, Messrs Barlow elected to refrain from using any untested engineering principles, instead choosing to strictly adhere to established methodology.

=== Design details ===
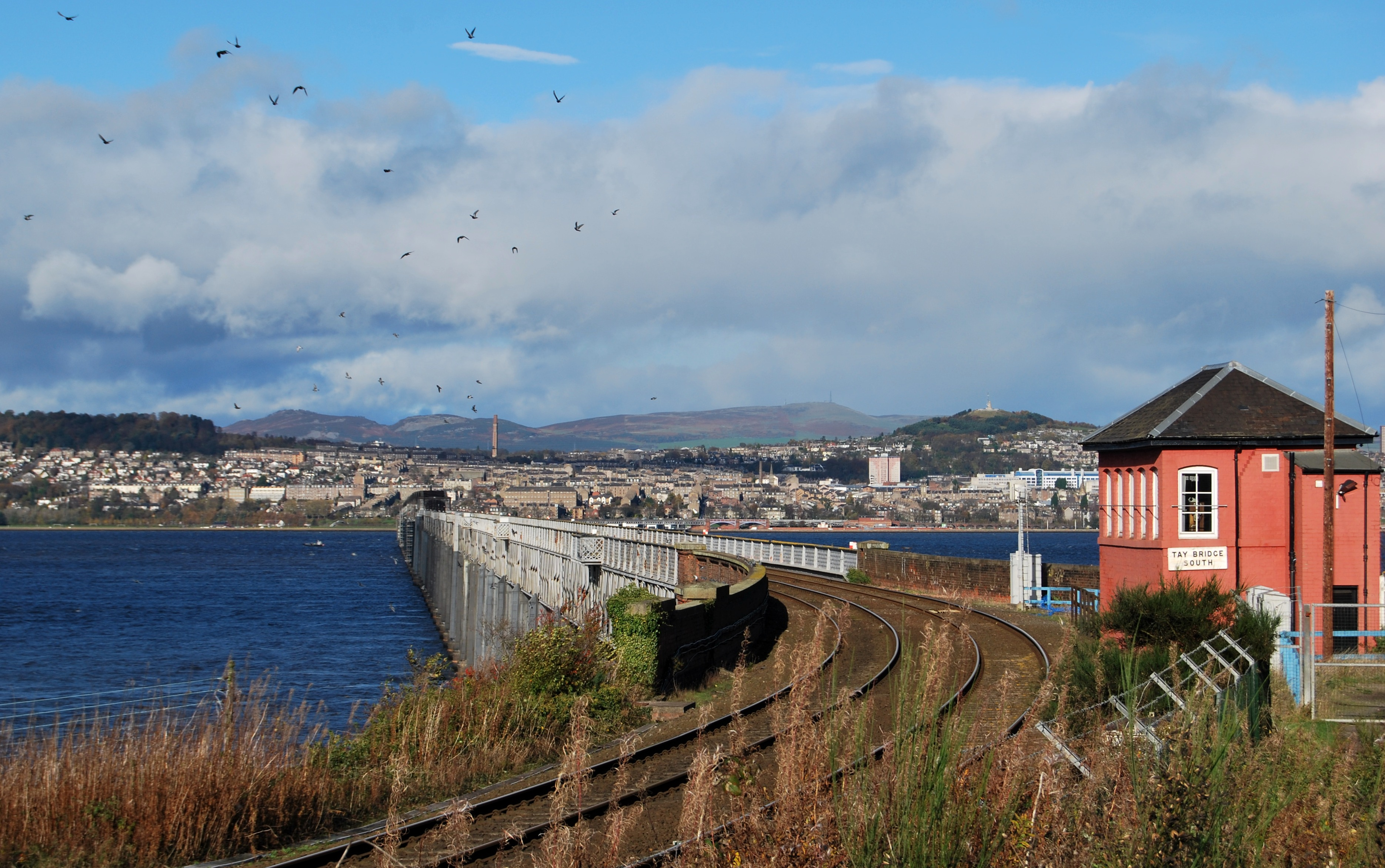
Tay Bridge and Signal Box Wormit

Video showing view from northbound passenger train crossing bridge towards Dundee. Camera pointing primarily eastwards. (Contains some flickering).

Video showing train approaching the Dundee end of the bridge.

The second Tay Bridge is a straightforward pier-and-lattice girder bridge; aside from its considerable length, it lacks any distinguishing characteristics. It has an overall length of 10,780 feet (3,290 m), which is covered by a total of 85 spans. These spans are ordinary brick arches, backed by cement concrete and set on top of piers which are supported by pairs of columns. Wanting to avoid a repeat of the fate of the First Tay Bridge, a principal intention of the design is stability, followed in importance by measures to minimise the bridge's weight and the adoption of aesthetically pleasing shaping where possible without compromising on structural strength.

The piers, which are primarily built from brick and concrete, are enclosed by a wrought iron caisson up to the low-water mark, above which a brick exterior is used, which cannot be infiltrated by water. The submerged portions are cased with blue vitrified brick. Above the high-water mark, each pair of piers has a connecting masonry section, terminating at the superstructure's base. Due to the high proportion of masonry on the piers, they were extremely heavy, which meant that Messrs Barlow worked to minimise the structure's weight without the piers being weakened. As such, a graceful iron superstructure was adopted.

Above the brickwork, two firmly braced octagonal columns continued upwards to meet the inner members in the form of an arch. Other members were used to provide a bed for the girders to provide for substantial pier that took much of its weight away from the basal area. Since the Second Tay Bridge's completion, the lattice girder arrangement has become a commonplace feature, near-universally adopted for bridge construction. The configuration provides for a high levels of compression strain despite the girders being comparatively light. The decking is composed of steel and is surrounded both sides of the bridge by a closely knit latticework, which functions as a wind screen as well as somewhat protecting the workers.

=== Construction ===
On 9 March 1882, the work on the second bridge commenced, located 20 yards (18 m) upstream of, and parallel to, the original bridge. The first portions of the bridge to be erected were built upon the southern shore; work proceeded for some time before construction activities were initiated on the northern shore. Despite this, the majority of the bridge was erected simultaneously at both ends, continuing until the centre girders were connected and the junction was completed. Only some of the girders of the old bridge were reused for the new structure, and none were used without being subjected to considerable testing beforehand. It is believed that fourteen men died during the bridge's construction, most by drowning.

Large quantities of materials were used in the construction of the bridge. In terms of wrought iron, 16,300 tons were used for the piers and girders; if the 118 girders from the previous bridge are also included, the total weight is believed to amount to roughly 19,000 tons. 3,500 tons of steel was also used, while the cast iron elements of the piers weighs 2,500 tons, for a combined 25,000 tons of iron and steel having been used. Around 10 million bricks, possessing a combined weight of 37,500 tons, were used to build both the approaches to the bridge and the cylinders. The total weight of the concrete used is 70,000 tons. Additionally, the bridge contains around 3,000,000 rivets.

The estimated cost for the second bridge was £640,000 equivalent to £68,760,141.7 in 2025 ; while this figure was overrun, it did not prove to have been overly optimistic. When the construction work is broken down, the founding of the piers was calculated as having cost £282,000, the installation of the girders and parapets £268,000, while £90,000 was involved in producing the approaches and arches. Some additional costs of roughly £16,000 had been incurred to improve the approach to the bridge from Newport; the branch line was reconstructed for a distance of half a mile eastward. When combined with the £350,000 cost of the first Tay Bridge, the North British Railway had spent roughly a million pounds to bridge the Tay.

=== Operational use ===
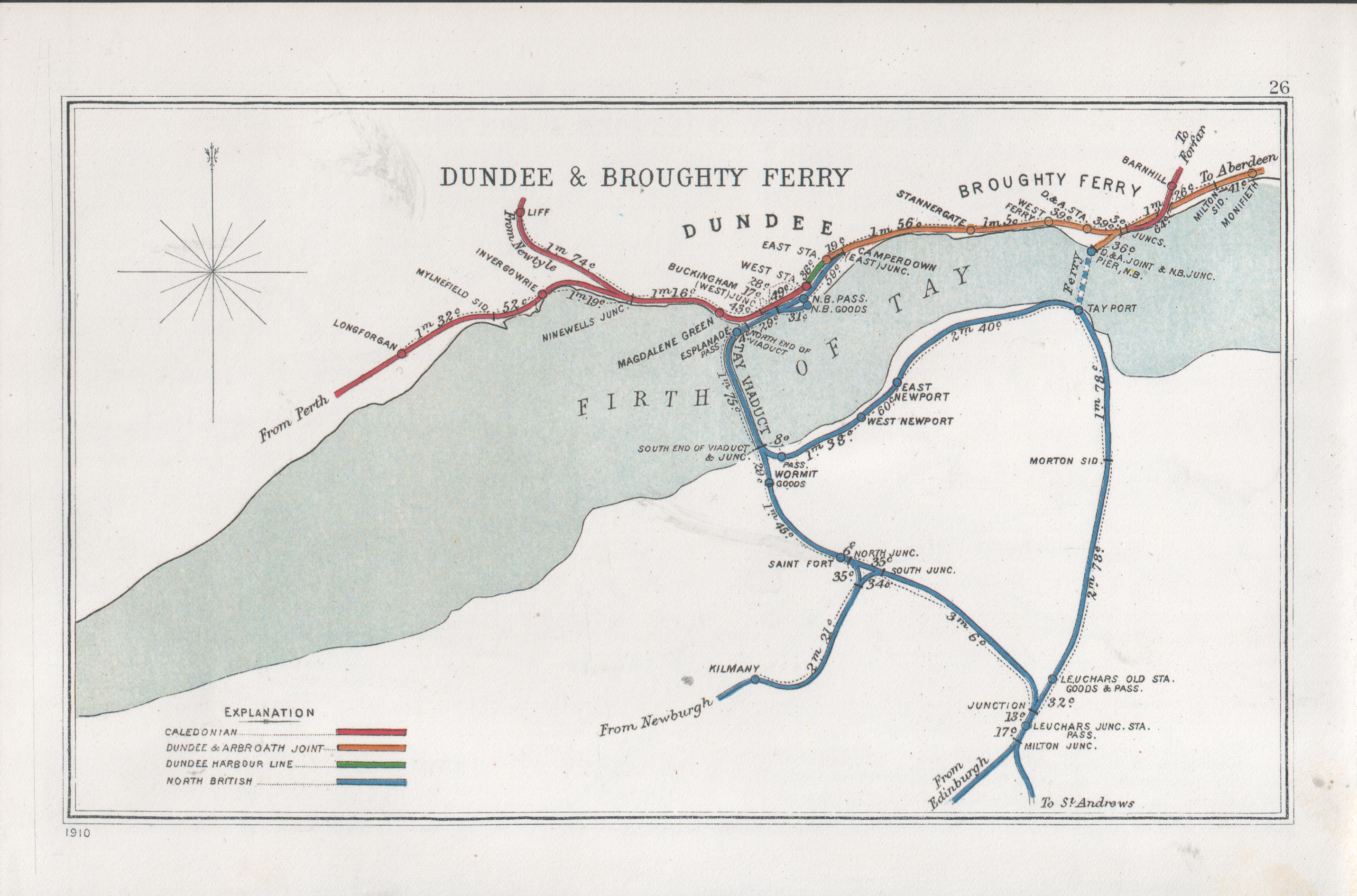
A 1910 Railway Clearing House Junction Diagram showing the Tay Bridge and connecting lines, also the ferry connecting Tayport with Broughty Ferry

Prior to entering service, the completed structure was subjected to an extensive examination by inspectors working for the Board of Trade. Being keen to avoid a repeat of the disaster of the first Tay Bridge, the second bridge was subjected to stringent testing, which in some cases simulated conditions that were far in excess of any ever likely to be encountered during the entirety of its service life. According to the reports submitted, the results from this testing were satisfying, clearing the way for operational use. On 11 June 1887, the first passenger-carrying trains passed along the second Tay Bridge. On 20 June 1887, which also happened to be the 50th anniversary of Queen Victoria's accession, the bridge was opened for use by general traffic.

The second Tay Bridge has remained in use to the present day. To protect the structure from sustaining damage, the double-heading of locomotives is restricted on trains that traverse the bridge; it has been stipulated that some combinations of consecutive locomotives must be separated by at least 60 feet (18 m) using barrier or reach wagons.

During 2003, a £20.85 million strengthening and refurbishment project on the bridge won the British Construction Industry Civil Engineering Award, in consideration of the staggering scale and logistics involved. More than 1,000 metric tons (1,100 short tons) of bird droppings were scraped off the ironwork lattice of the bridge using hand tools, and bagged into 25-kilogram (55 lb) sacks. At the same time, hundreds of thousands of rivets were removed and replaced, all of which was being done by workers who were in exposed conditions while high over a firth with fast-running tides.

== See also ==
- David Kirkaldy
- Harry Watts
- Tommy Burns
- History of Dundee
- List of bridge disasters
- List of structural failures and collapses
- List of bridges in Scotland
- Structural engineering
- Structural failure
- William McGonagall
