= Thomas Bouch =

British railway engineer (1822–1880)

Sir Thomas Bouch
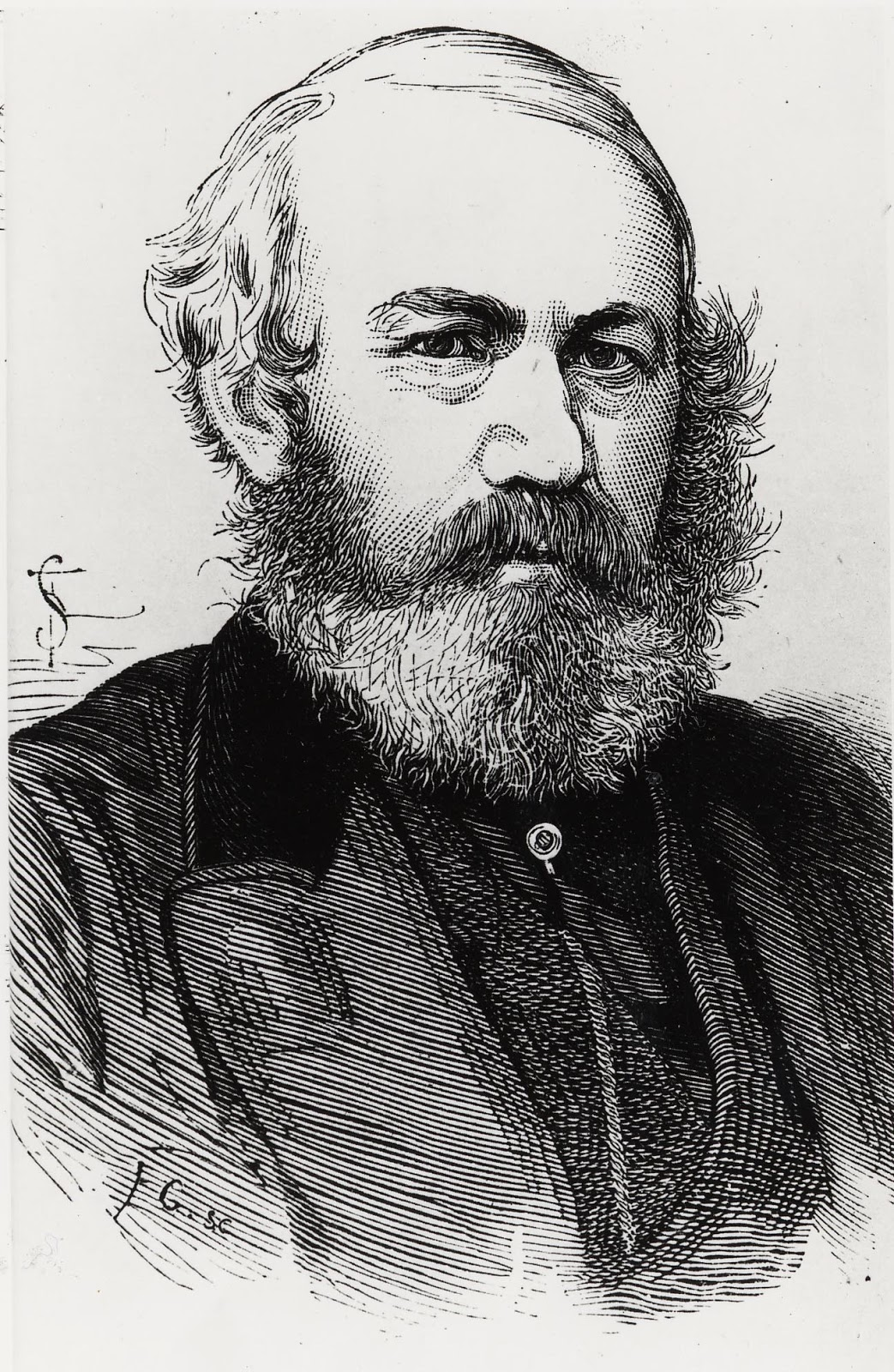
- Born: 25 February 1822; Thursby, Cumberland, England
- Died: 30 October 1880 (aged 58); Moffat, Scotland
- Engineering career
- Discipline: Civil engineer Structural engineer
- Institutions: Institution of Civil Engineers (Associate 1850, Member 1858)
- Projects: Waverley Station, Tay Rail Bridge

Sir Thomas Bouch (/ˈbaʊtʃ/; 22 February 1822 – 30 October 1880) was a British railway engineer. He was born in Thursby, near Carlisle, Cumberland, and lived in Edinburgh. As manager of the Edinburgh and Northern Railway he introduced the first roll-on/roll-off train ferry service in the world. Subsequently as a consulting engineer, he helped develop the caisson and popularised the use of lattice girders in railway bridges. He was knighted after the successful completion of the first Tay Railway Bridge, but his reputation was destroyed by the subsequent Tay Bridge disaster, in which 75 people are believed to have died as a result of defects in design, construction and maintenance, for all of which Bouch was held responsible. He died within 18 months of being knighted.

== Early career ==
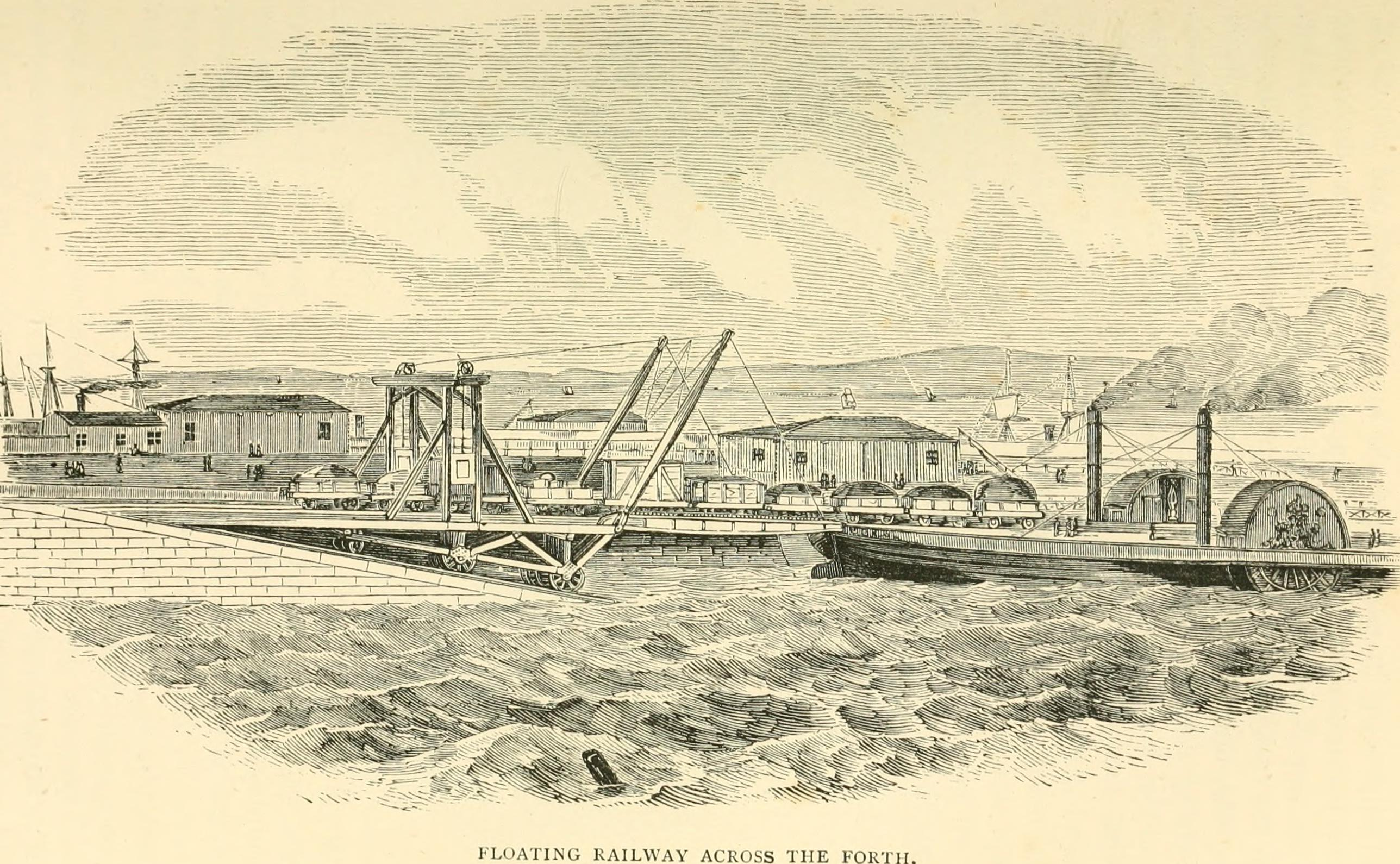
Bouch's pioneering ferry ramp

Bouch's father (a retired sea-captain) kept the Ship Inn at Thursby and Thomas was educated locally (Thursby and then Carlisle) before at the age of 17 beginning his civil engineering career as assistant to one of the engineers constructing the Lancaster and Carlisle Railway. After a short spell working in Leeds (1844–45) he was for four years one of the Resident Engineers on the Stockton and Darlington Railway, leaving in 1849 to become manager and engineer of the Edinburgh and Northern Railway, one of the precursors of the North British Railway. He introduced the first roll-on roll-off train ferries in the world, across the Firth of Forth from Granton to Burntisland in Fife (3 February 1850.) Others had had similar ideas, but Bouch put them into effect, and did so with an attention to detail (such as design of the ferry slip) which led a subsequent President of the Institution of Civil Engineers to settle any dispute over priority of invention with the observation that "there was little merit in a simple conception of this kind, compared with a work practically carried out in all its details, and brought to perfection."

== Railway and bridge designer ==
Bouch then set up on his own as a railway engineer, working chiefly in Scotland and Northern England. Lines he designed include four connecting lines all built by separate companies, which together allowed a direct connection between the West Cumbrian haematite mines and the area served by the Stockton and Darlington (which was behind them):

- the Darlington and Barnard Castle Railway (20 miles, completed 1856)
- the South Durham and Lancashire Union Railway (from a junction near West Auckland via Barnard Castle, over Stainmore via Kirkby Stephen to a junction with the West Coast Main Line at Tebay (50 miles, completed 1861 (Barnard Castle – Tebay) 1863 (remainder), total cost £666,879) This included his viaduct over the Gaunless.)
- the Eden Valley Railway (Kirkby Stephen to Penrith, 22 miles, completed 1862, cost £204,803)
- the Cockermouth, Keswick and Penrith Railway (31 miles (including 135 bridges), completed 1864, constructed for £267,000)

His response to a toast at a dinner after the cutting of the first sod on the Eden Railway gave his philosophy on the engineering of those lines:

The works were all of a light and inexpensive character, and if he gave them a first-class railway, - one upon which any speed attainable by a locomotive engine could be run with perfect safety and ease - if he gave it without any extravagance, then he should only have done his duty, but if he failed then he should deserve all the obloquy and discredit attaching to the failure of light works. … Mr Whitwell had spoken of his character as a maker of cheap railways, but in giving a cheap Eden Valley railway he had relied entirely upon the easy district, and not on inferiority of the works. The line would be carried out in the most permanent and substantial manner possible.

He made considerable use of lattice girder bridges, both with conventional masonry piers and with iron lattice piers; the most notable examples of the latter being on the Stainmore line: the Deepdale and Belah Viaducts. A contemporary treatise on iron bridges praised the detailed engineering of the Belah viaduct piers (and described the viaduct as one of the lightest and cheapest of the kind that had ever been erected.)

Elsewhere, Bouch's forte was cheapness, and an ability to construct branch lines at a capital cost that might allow them to pay their way, especially if operated frugally (In 1854 Bouch advised the directors of the Peebles Railway that the company should work the line themselves, as they could do so much more economically than a large undertaking.) Examples included branches to St Andrews, to Leven, and to Peebles, the Peebles line being described in his obituary as "long the pattern for cheap construction". This could leave over-optimistic clients with a railway designed and built to a price and not making enough money to support proper maintenance (and hence laying up problems for itself as an accident on the St Andrews Railway showed).

Bouch did the initial survey for the Edinburgh Suburban and Southside Junction Railway, laid out tramway systems in Edinburgh, Glasgow, Dundee and London, and designed the Redheugh viaduct a road bridge across the Tyne at the same height as and not far upstream of Stephenson's High Level Bridge. He also designed Hownes Gill Viaduct in Consett, County Durham, which at 700 feet (210 m) long and using a 12-arch design constructed in brick, carried the Stanhope and Tyne Railway 175 feet (53 m) above Hownsgill. Today it forms part of the Sea to Sea Cycle Route.

Bouch returned repeatedly to the problem of bridging the two great East Coast firths. Eventually authorisation was given to bridge both the Tay and the Forth; in both cases Bouch was the engineer selected to design the bridge.

== Tay Bridge ==
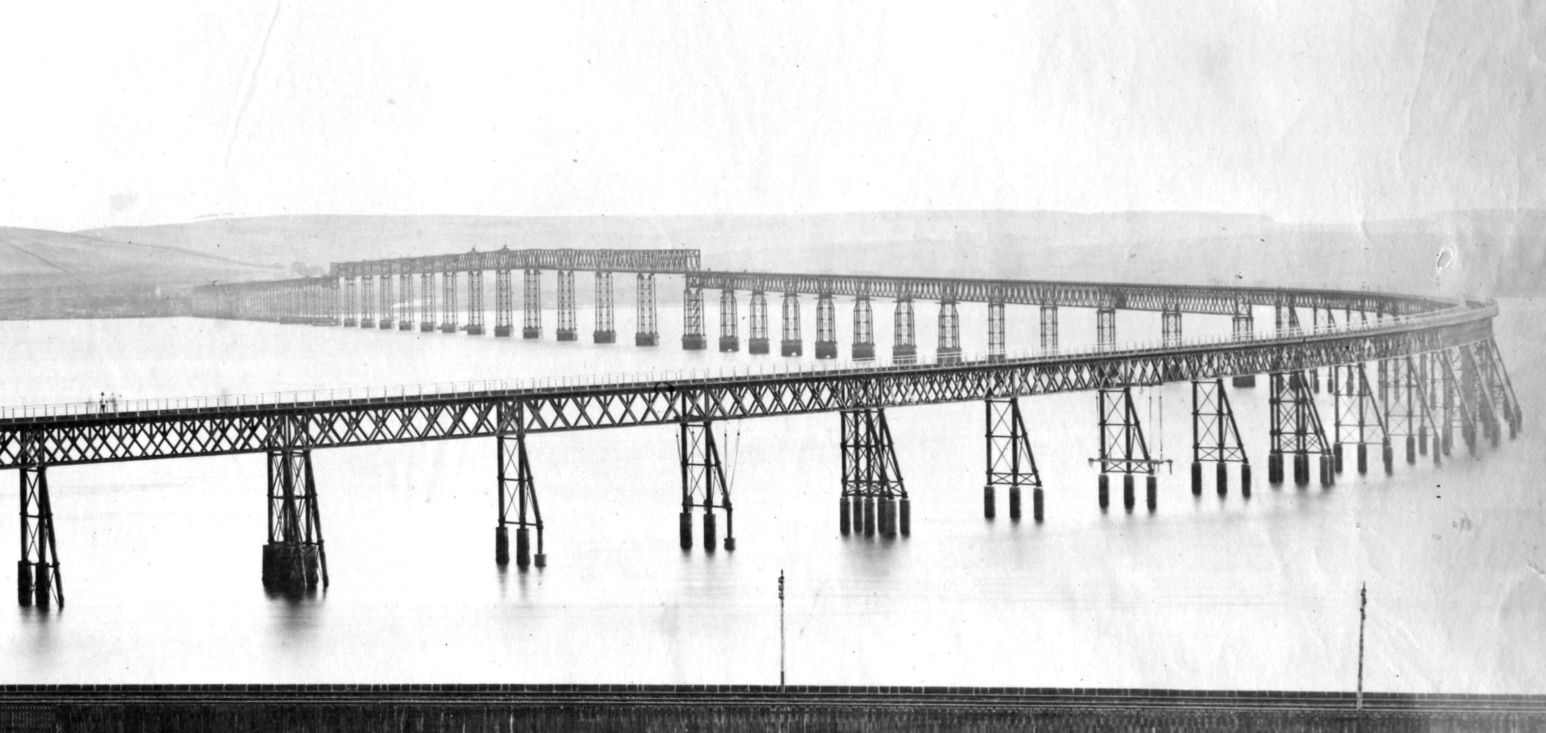
Original Tay Bridge from the north

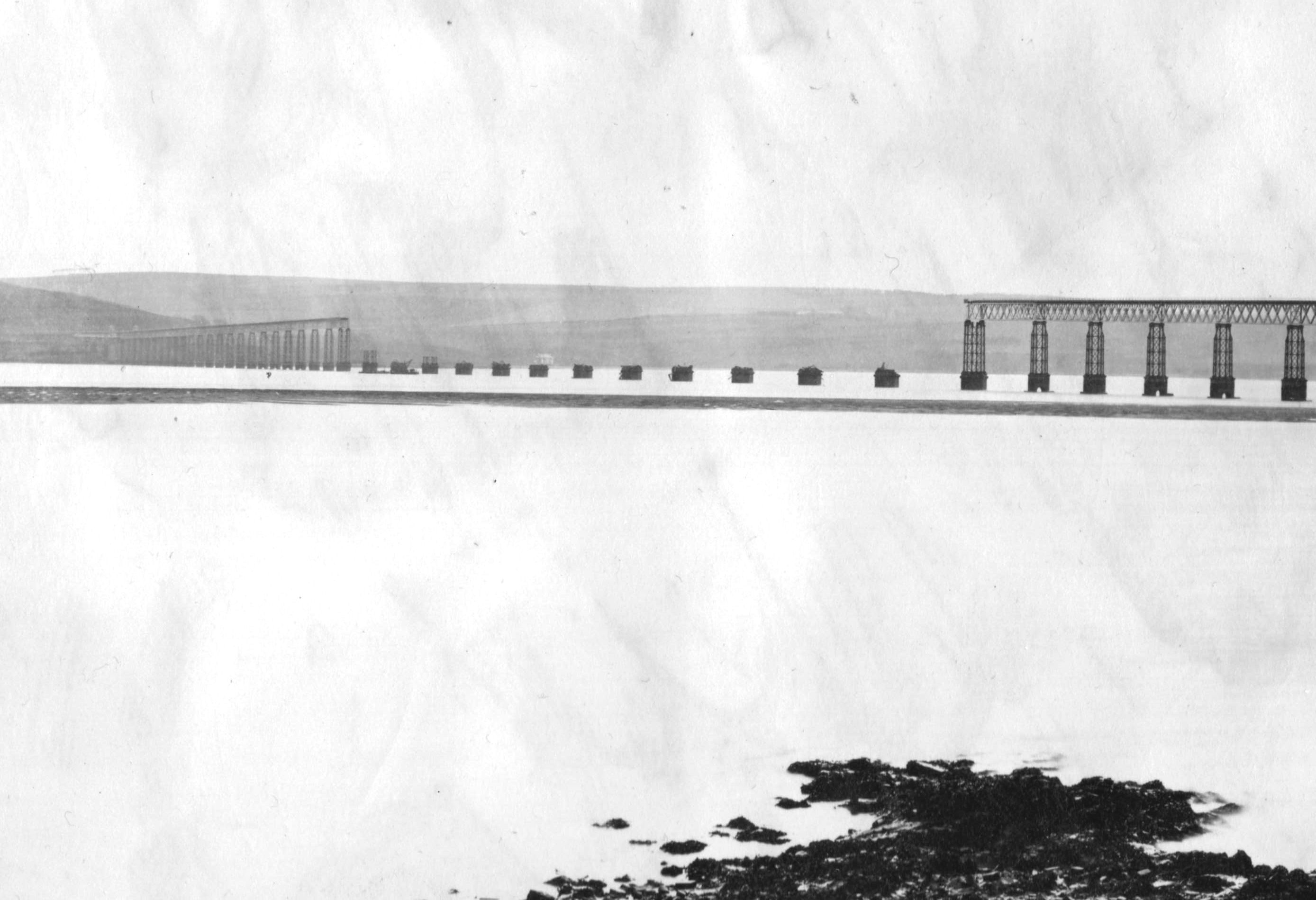
Fallen Tay Bridge from the north

Bouch designed the first Tay Rail Bridge while working for the North British Railway, and the official opening took place in May 1878. Queen Victoria travelled over it in late June 1879, and she awarded him a knighthood in recognition of his achievement. The bridge collapsed on 28 December 1879, in the Tay Bridge disaster, when it was hit by strong side winds. A train was travelling over it at the time, and 75 people died.

The subsequent public inquiry revealed that the contractors to the railway company sacrificed safety and durability to save costs. Sloppy work practices, such as poor casting of the metal, and the re-use of girders dropped into the estuary during construction, were factors in the bridge's collapse.

The minority report of the inquiry concluded that the bridge was "badly designed, badly built, and badly maintained". The entire "high girders" section, in which trains ran inside the girders rather than on top of them, fell during the accident, taking the train with it. Analysis of the archives has shown that the design, which featured cast-iron columns with integral lugs holding the tie bars, was a critical mistake, because cast iron is brittle under tension. Many similar bridges had been built using cast-iron columns and wrought iron tie bars, but none used that particular design detail. Gustave Eiffel built many such bridges in France in the 1860s, some surviving and still carrying railway traffic.

Being the engineer, Thomas Bouch was blamed for the collapse of the Tay bridge. His assistant, Charles Meik, conveyed the impression that he "was aptly named", implying that he had no real influence over the design and construction.

=== Aftermath of the disaster ===
==== South Esk Viaduct ====
After the inquiry, Bouch rapidly removed and reinforced similar lugs on the new bridge he had built, the South Esk Viaduct, at Montrose, but after another inspection, the bridge was demolished and replaced.

==== Tay Bridge ====
The remains of the original Tay bridge were demolished and replaced by an entirely new design by William Henry Barlow and his son Crawford Barlow. Some of the wrought iron girders were re-used in the new double track bridge by cutting them in half and re-welding to form wider structures for the track. The brick and masonry piers from the old bridge were left as breakwaters for the new piers, which were monocoques of wrought iron and steel.

==== Forth Bridge ====
Bouch's design for a suspension bridge to take a railway across the Firth of Forth, had been accepted and the foundation stone laid, but the project was cancelled following the Tay Bridge disaster. One of the piers still remains at the site. A different design, a cantilever bridge, was drawn up by Sir Benjamin Baker and Sir John Fowler. The Forth Bridge was completed in 1890.

== Other works ==
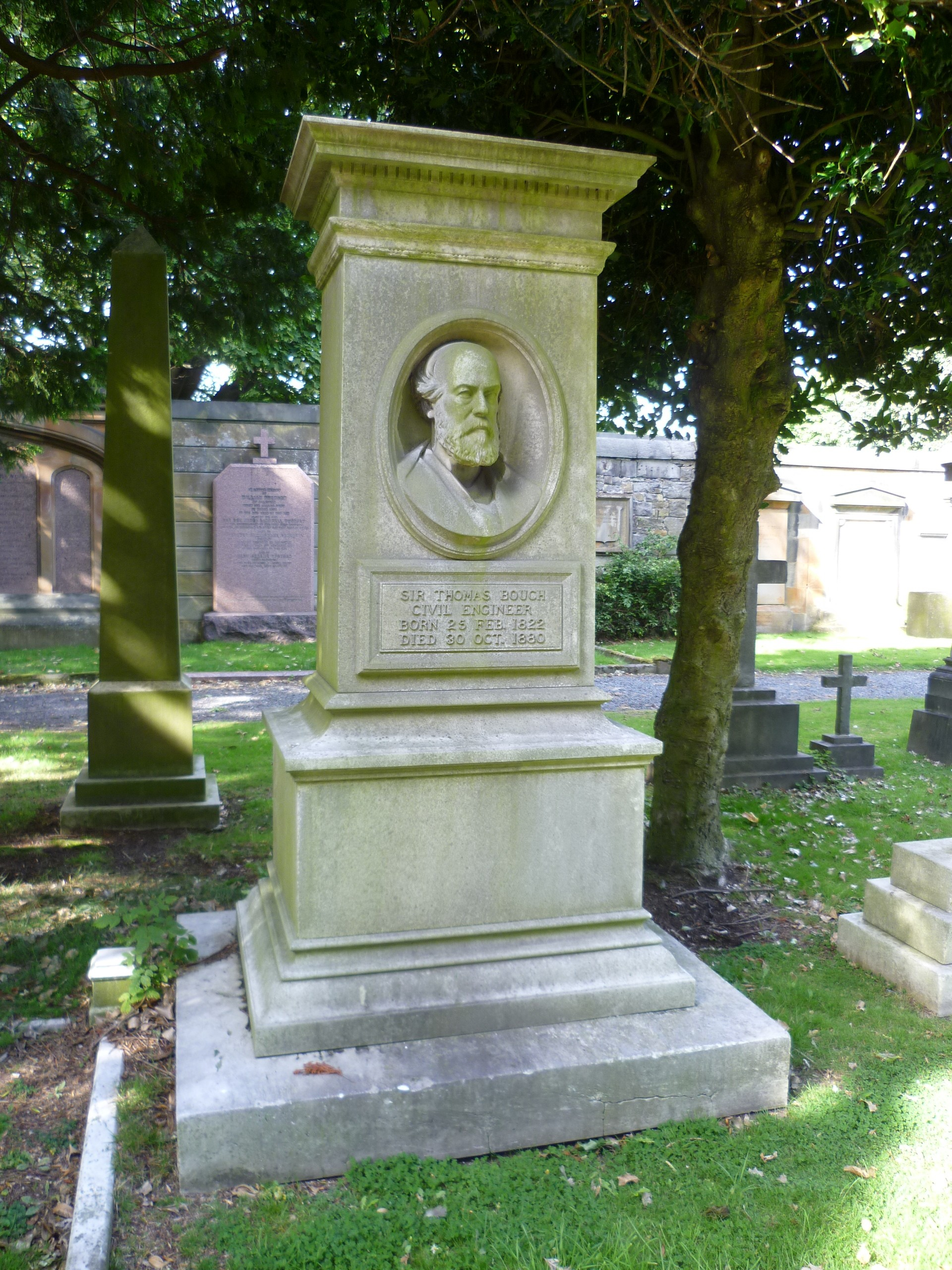
Bouch's tomb in the Dean Cemetery, Edinburgh

Bouch also seems to have been involved in the design of pleasure piers. He designed Portobello Pier in 1869, which opened in 1871. The structure rusted badly and by 1917 was uneconomic to repair and was demolished.

== Family ==
Thomas was a brother of William Bouch, the railway engine designer. Thomas married Margaret Forrest in Longtown, Cumberland, in early 1856. There were three children: Fanny, born 1854; Elizabeth Ann, born 1856; William, born 1859.

== Death ==
Thomas Bouch bought a country house in Moffat, "his health", already not good, "more rapidly gave way... under the shock and distress of mind" caused by the disaster. However he kept offices in Edinburgh, at 111 George Street, his Edinburgh address being 6 Oxford Terrace, near Dean Bridge.

He died at his house in Moffat on 30 October 1880 a few months after the public inquiry into the disaster finished. He is buried very close by, in Dean Cemetery. "In his death", said the journal of the Institution of Civil Engineers, "the profession has to lament one who, though perhaps carrying his works nearer to the margin of safety than many others would have done, displayed boldness, originality and resource in a high degree, and bore a distinguished part in the later development of the railway system".
