= Portobello Pier =

Coordinates: 55.9559°N 3.1079°W

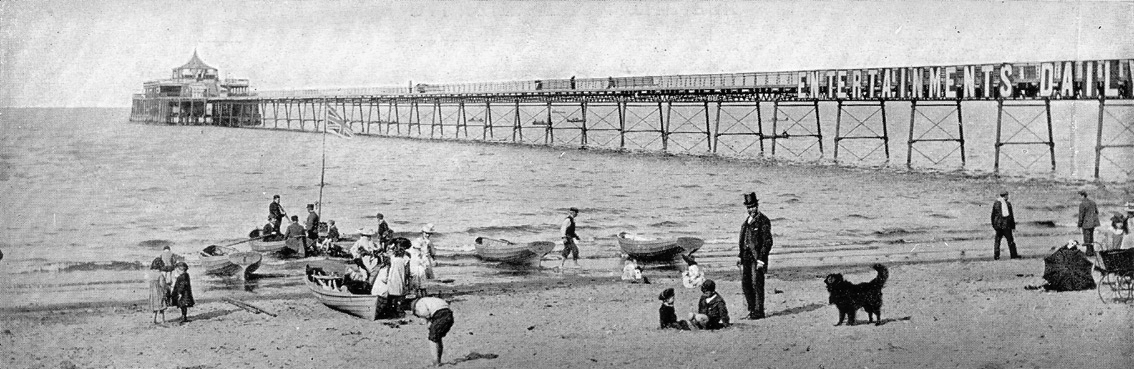
- Interactive map of the Portobello Pier area

General information
- Status: Demolished
- Location: Portobello, Edinburgh
- Completed: 1871
- Opened: 23 May 1871
- Demolished: 1917
- Cost: £10,000

Dimensions
- Other dimensions: 1,250 feet (length)

Design and construction
- Architect: Thomas Bouch

Portobello Pier was a pleasure pier opened in Portobello, Edinburgh, Scotland. Designed by Thomas Bouch, it was 1,250 feet (380 m) long and 22 feet (6.70 m) wide, and included a tea room, camera obscura, and a concert hall. The final construction costs were £10,000.

== History ==
Portobello Pier Act 1869
- Act of Parliament
- Parliament of the United Kingdom
- Long title: An Act to authorize the construction of a Pier at Portobello in the county of Edinburgh.
- Citation: 32 & 33 Vict. c. clvi

Dates
- Royal assent: 9 August 1869

Text of statute as originally enacted

Parliament passed the Portobello Pier Act 1869 (32 & 33 Vict. c. clvi), an act for the erection of a pier at Portobello with the view of developing and promoting the town "as a place of pleasure and enjoyment to its inhabitants and to the many visitors from Edinburgh and from afar". It opened on 23 May 1871. In August of that year, on the holiday marking the hundredth birthday of Sir Walter Scott, over 2,500 people visited the pier at a cost of one penny. The success of the pier saw day-trippers come by train from all over southern Scotland to Portobello. Pleasure boat excursions to the Isle of May, Elie, North Berwick, and Bass Rock were also offered. However, the fact that the pier was open on a Sunday caused controversy. In 1892, the pier changed ownership when the North British Railway Company bought the Galloway Company, maintaining steamer services from the pier until the Forth fleet was requisitioned by the government for World War I, leading to the closure of the pier.

Along with falling into disuse, the pier was also damaged by storms and the iron supports of the pier corroded, which led to its demolition in 1917.

== Attempted revivals ==
In 1933, plans were drawn up by a group of private entrepreneurs to build a new pier which would have connected the existing promenade with three gangways opposite Bath Street, Melville Street, and Wellington Street respectively. The plans included an enclosed bathing pond, enclosed boating and sand space, restaurants, shops, and a concert hall as well as facilities for pleasure steamer services. Construction was planned at an estimated cost of £60,000, but proposals were rejected by the town council. The plans were eventually abandoned due to World War II.

In 2015, a proposal was made to build a new pier on the original site. Big Things on the Beach Trust and Architecture firm, Smith Scott Mullan Associates, presented plans for a multi-function pier with performance and live events space, a cafe, meeting rooms, and facilities for sports clubs.
