= Belah Viaduct =

Railway viaduct in Cumbria, England

Coordinates: 54.4890°N 2.2498°W

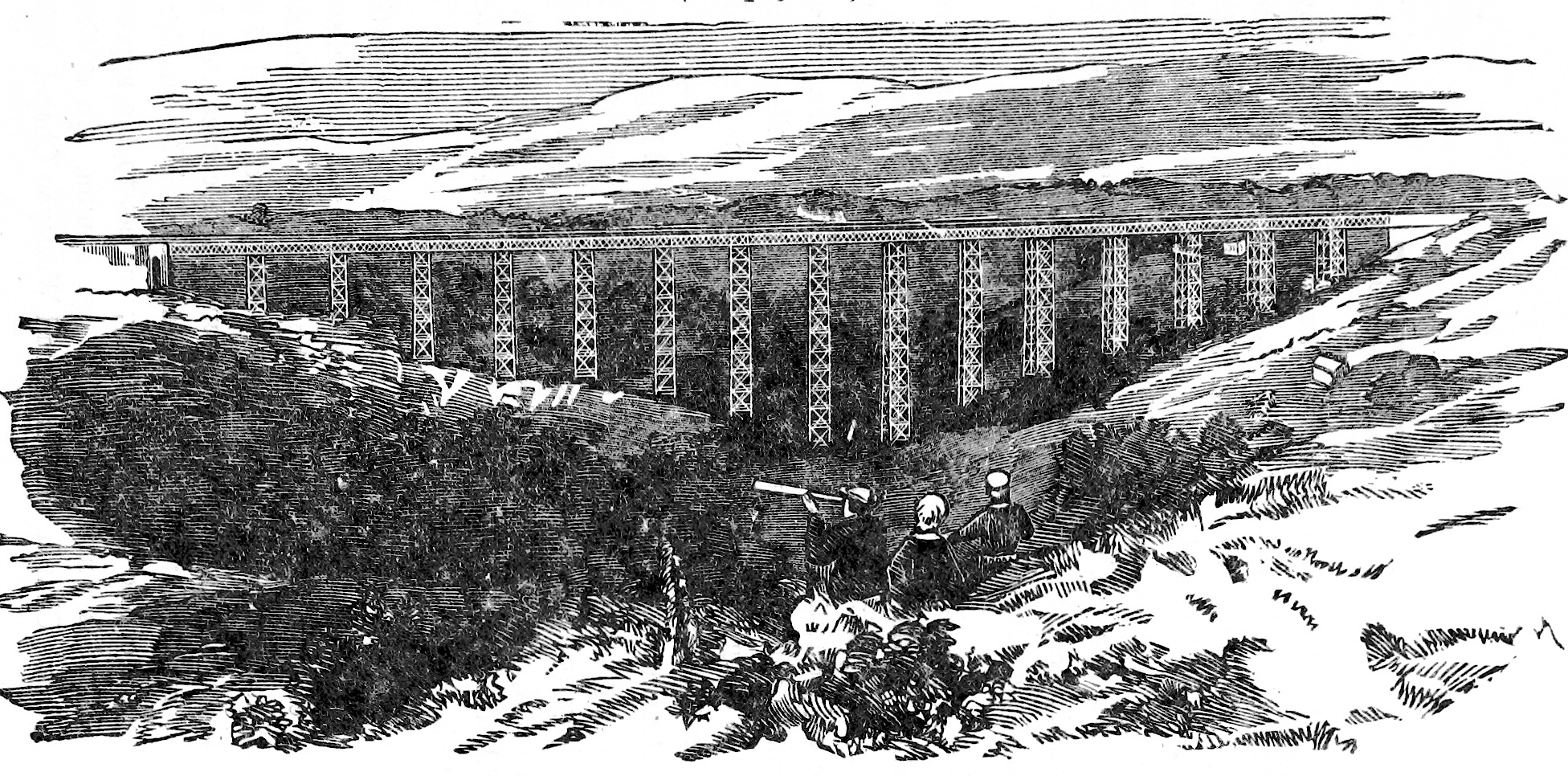
The Belah Viaduct in 1884

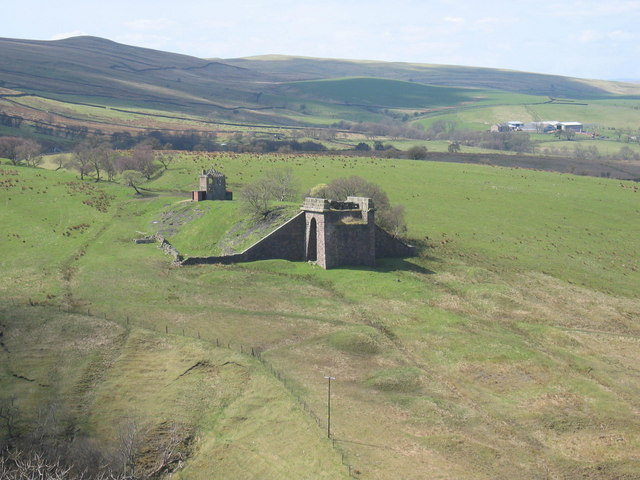
The signal box and southwest abutment of the demolished Belah Viaduct, in 2006

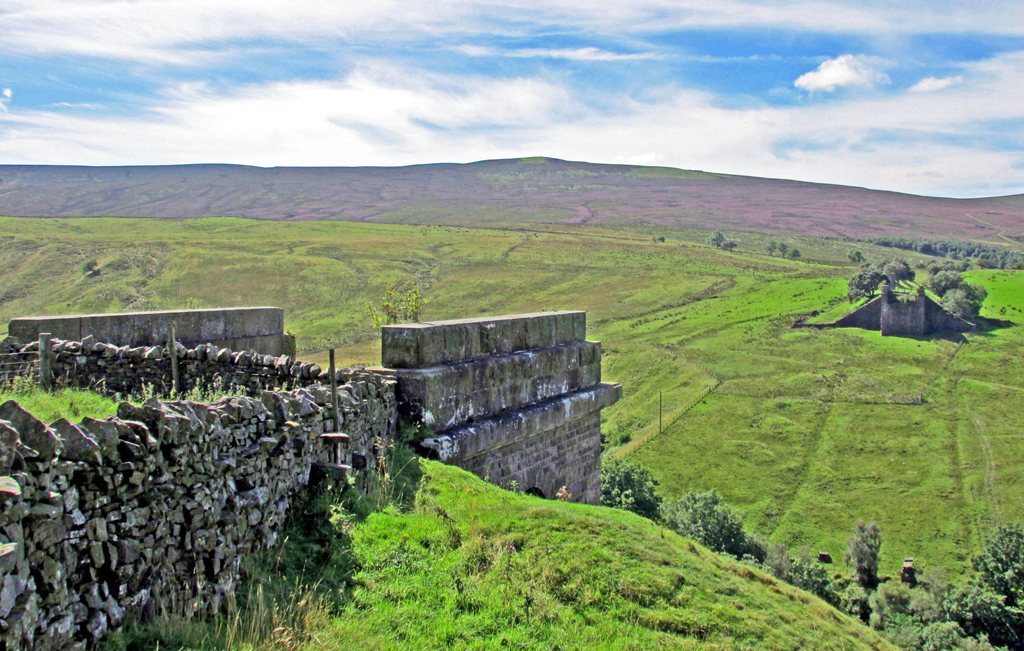
The northeast abutment of the viaduct looking across the Belah valley towards the SW abutment in 2016

The Belah Viaduct was a railway viaduct on the South Durham and Lancashire Union Railway, crossing the River Belah, in Cumbria, England, about 1 mile (1.6 km) south of the village of Barras and 4 miles (6.4 km) east north east of Kirkby Stephen. It was completed in 1860 and was demolished in 1963.

The viaduct was designed by Thomas Bouch and the ironwork was supplied and erected by Gilkes Wilson; both Bouch and Gilkes Wilson were also responsible for the later Tay Bridge. It had 'double' Warren truss girders on cast iron columns, and was constructed at a cost of £31,630. The foundation stone was laid in November 1857.

The first locomotive crossed the viaduct in November 1860, and the line opened on 7 August 1861.

It was 347 yards (317 m) long, 24 feet (7.3 m) wide, with 16 spans, and at 196 feet (60 m) it was the highest bridge in England when it was built (but 4 feet (1.2 m) lower than the Crumlin Viaduct in Wales).

Post-WWII, weight limitations on the aging viaduct and its limited maintenance led to a ban on double heading across both Belah and Deepdale Viaducts. As two light locomotives were still needed to haul trains up the inclines of the Tebay line, one worked as a banker at the rear. This also caused problems if the breakdown crane from Darlington was needed. This 45 ton crane itself had a weight of 156 tons. Hauling it across the viaducts required it to be spaced from the locomotive by at least three empty wagons, to distribute the load.

In 1956 the viaduct was completely repainted, which "might have implied to some that BR valued the line as a long-term proposition", but the closure of the line was announced in 1959 and the final passenger train ran on 20 January 1962. The iron structure of the viaduct was demolished in the summer of 1963. The stone abutments at each side of the Belah valley still remain.

== Commemorative verses ==
Charles Davis wrote a verse about the viaduct, which was buried in the central column of the eighth pier on 6 September 1859 and found during demolition. The lines quoted in Dow's Dictionary of Railway Quotations are:

See! now Beelah's beauteous sights begin!
Whose curling stream shall ever flow within,
And underneath this splendid monster Bridge,
Shall floods henceforth descend from every Ridge;
And thousands wonder at the glorious sight,
When trains will run aloft both day and night;
For ages past, no human tongue could tell
Of such a structure o'er thy monster gill.
Time will roll on, and mortals may increase
When those who see it now, we hope will rest in peace.

Dow's Dictionary includes another verse, cited only as having been quoted in The Railway Magazine vol XLVI, 1920:

To future ages these lines will tell
Who built the structure o'er the dell.
Gilkes Wilson, with his eighty men,
Raised Belah's Viaduct o'er the glen.
