= River Belah =

River in Cumbria, England

Coordinates: 54°30′23″N 2°21′23″W

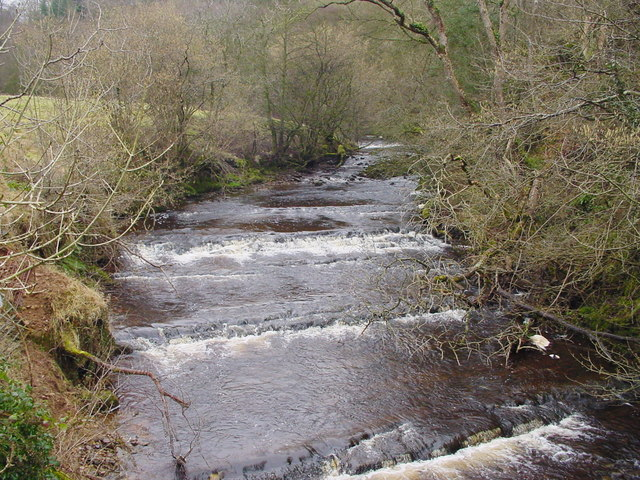
- River Belah from Oxenthwaite Bridge
- Etymology: Old English - Roaring River

Location
- Country: England
- State: Cumbria

Physical characteristics
- Source
  - location: Millstone Rigg
- Mouth: Blands Wath
  - location: Great Musgrave
- Length: 13.3 mi (21.4 km)
- Basin size: 17 mi^{2} (44 km^{2})

Basin features
- River system: River Eden

The River Belah is a river in the county of Cumbria in England. Its name derives from the Old English word Belge and means the "Roaring River".

The Belah is formed by the confluence of several small streams or sikes draining most of north and south Stainmore close to the border with County Durham and Yorkshire. It flows north west off the hillside as Bleaberry Beck and tumbles over many waterfalls before meeting the Stow Gill Becks and becoming the Belah. It then flows in a north westerly direction past Oxenthwaite where the river is swollen by Argill Beck at Field Head and the Powbrand Beck near Thorney Scale. Having washed by Brough Sowerby, the Belah combines its waters with those of the River Eden near to the village of Great Musgrave.

The Stainmore Railway crossed the river on the huge iron-girder lattice Belah Viaduct, before it was demolished in 1964. It was the highest bridge in England, (Note: The Crumlin Viaduct in Wales was a few feet taller, at 200 feet (61 m)) at 196 feet (60 m) high.

== Ecology ==
The Belah is designated as having a moderate ecological status by the environment agency. The flow of the river has been sped up by dredging and widening and the river is prone to siltation and bank erosion.
