= Civil parishes in Cumbria =

A map of Cumbria, showing the districts: (1) Cumberland; (2) Westmorland and Furness.

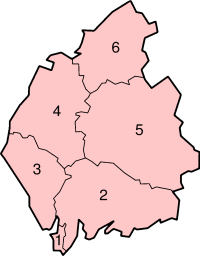
A map of Cumbria, showing the pre-2023 districts: (1) Barrow-in-Furness; (2) South Lakeland; (3) Copeland; (4) Allerdale; (5) Eden; and (6) Carlisle.

A civil parish in England is the lowest unit of local government. There are 284 civil parishes in the ceremonial county of Cumbria, with most of the county being parished. At the 2001 census, there were 359,692 people living in those 284 parishes, accounting for 73.8 per cent of the county's population.

The extent of modern civil parishes are largely geographically based on historic Church of England parish boundaries, which were ecclesiastical divisions that had acquired civil administration powers managed by the Vestry committee.

== History ==
The Highways Act 1555 made parishes responsible for the upkeep of roads. Every adult inhabitant of the parish was obliged to work four days a year on the roads, providing their own tools, carts and horses; the work was overseen by an unpaid local appointee, the Surveyor of Highways.

The poor were looked after by the monasteries, until their dissolution. In 1572, magistrates were given power to 'survey the poor' and impose taxes for their relief. This system was made more formal by the Poor Law Act 1601, which made parishes responsible for administering the Poor Law; overseers were appointed to charge a rate to support the poor of the parish. The 19th century saw an increase in the responsibility of parishes, although the Poor Law powers were transferred to Poor Law Unions. The Public Health Act 1872 grouped parishes into Rural Sanitary Districts, based on the Poor Law Unions; these subsequently formed the basis for Rural Districts.

Parishes were run by vestries, meeting annually to appoint officials, and were generally identical to ecclesiastical parishes, although some townships in large parishes administered the Poor Law themselves; under the Divided Parishes and Poor Law Amendment Act 1882, all extra-parochial areas and townships that levied a separate rate became independent civil parishes.

Civil parishes in their modern sense date from the Local Government Act 1894, which abolished vestries; established elected parish councils in all rural parishes with more than 300 electors; grouped rural parishes into Rural Districts; and aligned parish boundaries with county and borough boundaries. Urban civil parishes continued to exist, and were generally coterminous with the Urban District, Municipal Borough or County Borough in which they were situated; many large towns contained a number of parishes, and these were usually merged into one. Parish councils were not formed in urban areas, and the only function of the parish was to elect guardians to Poor Law Unions; with the abolition of the Poor Law system in 1930 the parishes had only a nominal existence.

The Local Government Act 1972 retained civil parishes in rural areas, and many former Urban Districts and Municipal Boroughs that were being abolished, were replaced by new successor parishes; urban areas that were considered too large to be single parishes became unparished areas.

== The current position ==
Recent governments have encouraged the formation of town and parish councils in unparished areas, and the Local Government and Rating Act 1997 gave local residents the right to demand the creation of a new civil parish.

A parish council can become a town council unilaterally, simply by resolution; and a civil parish can also gain city status, but only if that is granted by the Crown. The chairman of a town or city council is called a mayor. The Local Government and Public Involvement in Health Act 2007 introduced alternative names: a parish council can now choose to be called a community; village; or neighbourhood council.

Civil parishes with town status

== List of civil parishes and unparished areas ==
Image	Name	Status	Population	District	Former District (1974-2023)	Former local authority (pre 1974)	Refs
	Above Derwent	Civil parish	1,207	Cumberland	Allerdale	Cockermouth; Rural District	
	Aikton	Civil parish	480	Cumberland	Allerdale	Wigton; Rural District	
	Allhallows	Civil parish	548	Cumberland	Allerdale	Wigton; Rural District	
	Allonby	Civil parish	462	Cumberland	Allerdale	Wigton; Rural District	
	Aspatria	Town	2,718	Cumberland	Allerdale	Wigton; Rural District	
	Bassenthwaite	Civil parish	412	Cumberland	Allerdale	Cockermouth; Rural District	
	Bewaldeth and Snittlegarth	Civil parish	40	Cumberland	Allerdale	Cockermouth; Rural District	
	Blennerhasset and Torpenhow	Civil parish	437	Cumberland	Allerdale	Wigton; Rural District	
	Blindbothel	Civil parish	148	Cumberland	Allerdale	Cockermouth; Rural District	
	Blindcrake	Civil parish	287	Cumberland	Allerdale	Cockermouth; Rural District	
	Boltons	Civil parish	585	Cumberland	Allerdale	Wigton; Rural District	
	Borrowdale	Civil parish	438	Cumberland	Allerdale	Cockermouth; Rural District	
	Bothel and Threapland	Civil parish	438	Cumberland	Allerdale	Cockermouth; Rural District	
	Bowness	Civil parish	1,221	Cumberland	Allerdale	Wigton; Rural District	
	Bridekirk	Civil parish	636	Cumberland	Allerdale	Cockermouth; Rural District	
	Brigham	Civil parish	1,065	Cumberland	Allerdale	Cockermouth; Rural District	
	Bromfield	Civil parish	530	Cumberland	Allerdale	Wigton; Rural District	
	Broughton	Community	1,727	Cumberland	Allerdale	Cockermouth; Rural District	
	Broughton Moor	Civil parish	726	Cumberland	Allerdale	Cockermouth; Rural District	
	Buttermere	Civil parish	127	Cumberland	Allerdale	Cockermouth; Rural District	
	Caldbeck	Civil parish	714	Cumberland	Allerdale	Wigton; Rural District	
	Camerton	Civil parish	172	Cumberland	Allerdale	Cockermouth; Rural District	
	Cockermouth	Town	7,877	Cumberland	Allerdale	Cockermouth; Urban District	
	Crosscanonby	Civil parish	1,054	Cumberland	Allerdale	Cockermouth; Rural District	
	Dean	Civil parish	1,077	Cumberland	Allerdale	Cockermouth; Rural District	
	Dearham	Civil parish	2,028	Cumberland	Allerdale	Cockermouth; Rural District	
	Dundraw	Civil parish	167	Cumberland	Allerdale	Wigton; Rural District	
	Embleton	Civil parish	297	Cumberland	Allerdale	Cockermouth; Rural District	
	Gilcrux	Civil parish	303	Cumberland	Allerdale	Cockermouth; Rural District	
	Great Clifton	Civil parish	1,101	Cumberland	Allerdale	Cockermouth; Rural District	
	Greysouthen	Civil parish	508	Cumberland	Allerdale	Cockermouth; Rural District	
	Hayton and Mealo	Civil parish	229	Cumberland	Allerdale	Wigton; Rural District	
	Holme Abbey	Civil parish	776	Cumberland	Allerdale	Wigton; Rural District	
	Holme East Waver	Civil parish	306	Cumberland	Allerdale	Wigton; Rural District	
	Holme Low	Civil parish	373	Cumberland	Allerdale	Wigton; Rural District	
	Holme St Cuthbert	Civil parish	421	Cumberland	Allerdale	Wigton; Rural District	
	Ireby and Uldale	Civil parish	428	Cumberland	Allerdale	Wigton; Rural District	
	Keswick	Town	4,984	Cumberland	Allerdale	Keswick; Urban District	
	Kirkbampton	Civil parish	471	Cumberland	Allerdale	Wigton; Rural District	
	Kirkbride	Civil parish	519	Cumberland	Allerdale	Wigton; Rural District	
	Little Clifton	Civil parish	391	Cumberland	Allerdale	Cockermouth; Rural District	
	Lorton	Civil parish	250	Cumberland	Allerdale	Cockermouth; Rural District	
	Loweswater	Civil parish	209	Cumberland	Allerdale	Cockermouth; Rural District	
	Maryport	Town	11,275	Cumberland	Allerdale	Maryport Urban District	
	Oughterside and Allerby	Civil parish	626	Cumberland	Allerdale	Cockermouth; Rural District	
	Papcastle	Civil parish	406	Cumberland	Allerdale	Cockermouth; Rural District	
	Plumbland	Civil parish	367	Cumberland	Allerdale	Cockermouth; Rural District	
	Seaton	Civil parish	4,861	Cumberland	Allerdale	Cockermouth; Rural District	
	Sebergham	Civil parish	361	Cumberland	Allerdale	Wigton; Rural District	
	Setmurthy	Civil parish	108	Cumberland	Allerdale	Cockermouth; Rural District	
	Silloth-on-Solway	Town	2,932	Cumberland	Allerdale	Wigton; Rural District	
	Lands common to Holme Abbey, Holme Low and Holme St Cuthbert	Common lands	0	Cumberland	Allerdale	Wigton; Rural District	
	St John's Castlerigg and Wythburn	Civil parish	407	Cumberland	Allerdale	Cockermouth; Rural District	
	Thursby	Civil parish	1,185	Cumberland	Allerdale	Wigton; Rural District	
	Underskiddaw	Civil parish	282	Cumberland	Allerdale	Cockermouth; Rural District	
	Waverton	Civil parish	326	Cumberland	Allerdale	Wigton; Rural District	
	Westnewton	Civil parish	247	Cumberland	Allerdale	Wigton; Rural District	
	Westward	Civil parish	814	Cumberland	Allerdale	Wigton; Rural District	
	Wigton	Town	5,360	Cumberland	Allerdale	Wigton; Rural District	
	Winscales	Civil parish	186	Cumberland	Allerdale	Cockermouth; Rural District	
	Woodside	Civil parish	516	Cumberland	Allerdale	Wigton; Rural District	
	Workington	Town	24,295	Cumberland	Allerdale	Workington; Municipal Borough	
	Wythop	Civil parish	51	Cumberland	Allerdale	Cockermouth; Rural District	
	Barrow	Town	59,181	Westmorland and Furness	Barrow-in-Furness	Barrow in Furness; County Borough	
	Askam and Ireleth	Civil parish	3,632	Westmorland and Furness	Barrow-in-Furness	Dalton in Furness Urban District	
	Dalton Town with Newton	Town	8,394	Westmorland and Furness	Barrow-in-Furness	Dalton in Furness Urban District	
	Lindal and Marton	Civil parish	773	Westmorland and Furness	Barrow-in-Furness	Dalton in Furness Urban District	
	Arthuret	Civil parish	2,434	Cumberland	Carlisle	Border; Rural District	
	Askerton	Civil parish	162	Cumberland	Carlisle	Border; Rural District	
	Beaumont	Civil parish	447	Cumberland	Carlisle	Border; Rural District	
	Bewcastle	Civil parish	411	Cumberland	Carlisle	Border; Rural District	
	Brampton	Civil parish	4,361	Cumberland	Carlisle	Border; Rural District	
	Burgh by Sands	Civil parish	1,143	Cumberland	Carlisle	Border; Rural District	
	Burtholme	Civil parish	184	Cumberland	Carlisle	Border; Rural District	
	Carlatton	Civil parish	29	Cumberland	Carlisle	Border; Rural District	
	Carlisle	Unparished area	68,735	Cumberland	Carlisle	Carlisle; County Borough	
	Castle Carrock	Civil parish	309	Cumberland	Carlisle	Border; Rural District	
	Cummersdale	Civil parish	486	Cumberland	Carlisle	Border; Rural District	
	Cumrew	Civil parish	85	Cumberland	Carlisle	Border; Rural District	
	Cumwhitton	Civil parish	293	Cumberland	Carlisle	Border; Rural District	
	Dalston	Civil parish	2,643	Cumberland	Carlisle	Border; Rural District	
	Farlam	Civil parish	590	Cumberland	Carlisle	Border; Rural District	
	Hayton	Civil parish	2,180	Cumberland	Carlisle	Border; Rural District	
	Hethersgill	Civil parish	382	Cumberland	Carlisle	Border; Rural District	
	Irthington	Civil parish	712	Cumberland	Carlisle	Border; Rural District	
	Kingmoor	Civil parish	407	Cumberland	Carlisle	Border; Rural District	
	Kingwater	Civil parish	164	Cumberland	Carlisle	Border; Rural District	
	Kirkandrews (also known as Kirkandrews-on-Esk)	Civil parish	447	Cumberland	Carlisle	Border; Rural District	
	Kirklinton Middle	Civil parish	369	Cumberland	Carlisle	Border; Rural District	
	Midgeholme	Civil parish	67	Cumberland	Carlisle	Border; Rural District	
	Nether Denton	Civil parish	318	Cumberland	Carlisle	Border; Rural District	
	Nicholforest	Civil parish	386	Cumberland	Carlisle	Border; Rural District	
	Orton	Civil parish	383	Cumberland	Carlisle	Border; Rural District	
	Rockcliffe	Civil parish	733	Cumberland	Carlisle	Border; Rural District	
	Scaleby	Civil parish	349	Cumberland	Carlisle	Border; Rural District	
	Solport	Civil parish	168	Cumberland	Carlisle	Border; Rural District	
	St Cuthbert Without	Civil parish	2,043	Cumberland	Carlisle	Border; Rural District	
	Stanwix Rural	Civil parish	3,043	Cumberland	Carlisle	Border; Rural District	
	Stapleton	Civil parish	221	Cumberland	Carlisle	Border; Rural District	
	Upper Denton	Civil parish	92	Cumberland	Carlisle	Border; Rural District	
	Walton	Civil parish	278	Cumberland	Carlisle	Border; Rural District	
	Waterhead	Civil parish	124	Cumberland	Carlisle	Border; Rural District	
	Westlinton	Civil parish	359	Cumberland	Carlisle	Border; Rural District	
	Wetheral	Civil parish	5,203	Cumberland	Carlisle	Border; Rural District	
	Arlecdon and Frizington	Civil parish	3,678	Cumberland	Copeland	Ennerdale; Rural District	
	Beckermet	Civil parish	2,310	Cumberland	Copeland	Ennerdale; Rural District	
	Bootle	Civil parish	745	Cumberland	Copeland	Millom; Rural District	
	Cleator Moor	Town	6,939	Cumberland	Copeland	Ennerdale; Rural District	
	Distington	Civil parish	2,247	Cumberland	Copeland	Ennerdale; Rural District	
	Drigg and Carleton	Civil parish	450	Cumberland	Copeland	Millom; Rural District	
	Egremont	Town	7,444	Cumberland	Copeland	Ennerdale; Rural District	
	Ennerdale and Kinniside	Civil parish	240	Cumberland	Copeland	Ennerdale; Rural District	
	Eskdale	Civil parish	264	Cumberland	Copeland	Millom; Rural District	
	Gosforth	Civil parish	1,230	Cumberland	Copeland	Ennerdale; Rural District	
	Haile	Civil parish	237	Cumberland	Copeland	Ennerdale; Rural District	
	Irton with Santon	Civil parish	373	Cumberland	Copeland	Millom; Rural District	
	Lamplugh	Civil parish	763	Cumberland	Copeland	Ennerdale; Rural District	
	Lowca	Civil parish	773	Cumberland	Copeland	Ennerdale; Rural District	
	Lowside Quarter	Civil parish	379	Cumberland	Copeland	Ennerdale; Rural District	
	Millom	Town	7,132	Cumberland	Copeland	Millom; Rural District	
	Millom Without	Civil parish	1,638	Cumberland	Copeland	Millom; Rural District	
	Moresby	Civil parish	1,280	Cumberland	Copeland	Ennerdale; Rural District	
	Muncaster	Civil parish	335	Cumberland	Copeland	Millom; Rural District	
	Parton	Civil parish	924	Cumberland	Copeland	Ennerdale; Rural District	
	Ponsonby	Civil parish	92	Cumberland	Copeland	Ennerdale; Rural District	
	Seascale	Civil parish	1,747	Cumberland	Copeland	Millom; Rural District	
	St Bees	Civil parish	1,717	Cumberland	Copeland	Ennerdale; Rural District	
	Ulpha	Civil parish	159	Cumberland	Copeland	Millom; Rural District	
	Waberthwaite	Civil parish	274	Cumberland	Copeland	Millom; Rural District	
	Wasdale	Civil parish	79	Cumberland	Copeland	Ennerdale; Rural District	
	Weddicar	Civil parish	442	Cumberland	Copeland	Ennerdale; Rural District	
	Whicham	Civil parish	395	Cumberland	Copeland	Millom; Rural District	
	Whitehaven	Town	25,032	Cumberland	Copeland	Whitehaven; Municipal Borough	
	Ainstable	Civil parish	532	Westmorland and Furness	Eden	Penrith; Rural District	
	Alston Moor	Civil parish	2,156	Westmorland and Furness	Eden	Alston with Garrigill; Rural District	
	Appleby-in-Westmorland	Town	2,862	Westmorland and Furness	Eden	Appleby; Municipal Borough	
	Asby	Civil parish	280	Westmorland and Furness	Eden	North Westmorland; Rural District	
	Askham	Civil parish	360	Westmorland and Furness	Eden	North Westmorland; Rural District	
	Bampton	Civil parish	283	Westmorland and Furness	Eden	North Westmorland; Rural District	
	Barton and Pooley Bridge	Civil parish	232	Westmorland and Furness	Eden	North Westmorland; Rural District	
	Bolton	Civil parish	416	Westmorland and Furness	Eden	North Westmorland; Rural District	
	Brough	Civil parish	680	Westmorland and Furness	Eden	North Westmorland; Rural District	
	Brough Sowerby	Civil parish	127	Westmorland and Furness	Eden	North Westmorland; Rural District	
	Brougham	Civil parish	279	Westmorland and Furness	Eden	North Westmorland; Rural District	
	Castle Sowerby	Civil parish	337	Westmorland and Furness	Eden	Penrith; Rural District	
	Catterlen	Civil parish	471	Westmorland and Furness	Eden	Penrith; Rural District	
	Cliburn	Civil parish	204	Westmorland and Furness	Eden	North Westmorland; Rural District	
	Clifton	Civil parish	461	Westmorland and Furness	Eden	North Westmorland; Rural District	
	Colby	Civil parish	120	Westmorland and Furness	Eden	North Westmorland; Rural District	
	Crackenthorpe	Civil parish	77	Westmorland and Furness	Eden	North Westmorland; Rural District	
	Crosby Garrett	Civil parish	112	Westmorland and Furness	Eden	North Westmorland; Rural District	
	Crosby Ravensworth	Civil parish	538	Westmorland and Furness	Eden	North Westmorland; Rural District	
	Culgaith	Civil parish	721	Westmorland and Furness	Eden	Penrith; Rural District	
	Dacre	Civil parish	1,326	Westmorland and Furness	Eden	Penrith; Rural District	
	Dufton	Civil parish	169	Westmorland and Furness	Eden	North Westmorland; Rural District	
	Glassonby	Civil parish	314	Westmorland and Furness	Eden	Penrith; Rural District	
	Great Salkeld	Civil parish	445	Westmorland and Furness	Eden	Penrith; Rural District	
	Great Strickland	Civil parish	246	Westmorland and Furness	Eden	North Westmorland; Rural District	
	Greystoke	Civil parish	733	Westmorland and Furness	Eden	Penrith; Rural District	
	Hartley	Civil parish	133	Westmorland and Furness	Eden	North Westmorland; Rural District	
	Helbeck	Civil parish	19	Westmorland and Furness	Eden	North Westmorland; Rural District	
	Hesket	Civil parish	2,363	Westmorland and Furness	Eden	Penrith; Rural District	
	Hoff	Civil parish	189	Westmorland and Furness	Eden	North Westmorland; Rural District	
	Hunsonby	Civil parish	383	Westmorland and Furness	Eden	Penrith; Rural District	
	Hutton	Civil parish	326	Westmorland and Furness	Eden	Penrith; Rural District	
	Kaber	Civil parish	89	Westmorland and Furness	Eden	North Westmorland; Rural District	
	King's Meaburn	Civil parish	105	Westmorland and Furness	Eden	North Westmorland; Rural District	
	Kirkby Stephen	Civil parish	1,832	Westmorland and Furness	Eden	North Westmorland; Rural District	
	Kirkby Thore	Civil parish	731	Westmorland and Furness	Eden	North Westmorland; Rural District	
	Kirkoswald	Civil parish	870	Westmorland and Furness	Eden	Penrith; Rural District	
	Langwathby	Civil parish	748	Westmorland and Furness	Eden	Penrith; Rural District	
	Lazonby	Civil parish	980	Westmorland and Furness	Eden	Penrith; Rural District	
	Little Strickland	Civil parish	96	Westmorland and Furness	Eden	North Westmorland; Rural District	
	Long Marton	Civil parish	704	Westmorland and Furness	Eden	North Westmorland; Rural District	
	Lowther	Civil parish	402	Westmorland and Furness	Eden	North Westmorland; Rural District	
	Mallerstang	Civil parish	87	Westmorland and Furness	Eden	North Westmorland; Rural District	
	Martindale	Civil parish	49	Westmorland and Furness	Eden	North Westmorland; Rural District	
	Matterdale	Civil parish	526	Westmorland and Furness	Eden	Penrith; Rural District	
	Melmerby	Civil parish		Westmorland and Furness	Eden	Penrith; Rural District	
	Milburn	Civil parish	171	Westmorland and Furness	Eden	North Westmorland; Rural District	
	Morland	Civil parish	380	Westmorland and Furness	Eden	North Westmorland; Rural District	
	Mungrisdale	Civil parish	284	Westmorland and Furness	Eden	Penrith; Rural District	
	Murton	Civil parish	330	Westmorland and Furness	Eden	North Westmorland; Rural District	
	Musgrave	Civil parish	152	Westmorland and Furness	Eden	North Westmorland; Rural District	
	Nateby	Civil parish	110	Westmorland and Furness	Eden	North Westmorland; Rural District	
	Newbiggin	Civil parish	96	Westmorland and Furness	Eden	North Westmorland; Rural District	
	Newby	Civil parish	164	Westmorland and Furness	Eden	North Westmorland; Rural District	
	Ormside	Civil parish	133	Westmorland and Furness	Eden	North Westmorland; Rural District	
	Orton	Civil parish	594	Westmorland and Furness	Eden	North Westmorland; Rural District	
	Ousby	Civil parish	362	Westmorland and Furness	Eden	Penrith; Rural District	
	Patterdale	Civil parish	460	Westmorland and Furness	Eden	Lakes; Urban District	
	Penrith	Town	14,756	Westmorland and Furness	Eden	Penrith Urban District	
	Ravenstonedale	Civil parish	570	Westmorland and Furness	Eden	North Westmorland; Rural District	
	Shap	Civil parish	1,221	Westmorland and Furness	Eden	North Westmorland; Rural District	
	Shap Rural	Civil parish	119	Westmorland and Furness	Eden	North Westmorland; Rural District	
	Skelton	Civil parish	1,059	Westmorland and Furness	Eden	Penrith; Rural District	
	Sleagill	Civil parish	100	Westmorland and Furness	Eden	North Westmorland; Rural District	
	Sockbridge and Tirril	Civil parish	397	Westmorland and Furness	Eden	North Westmorland; Rural District	
	Soulby	Civil parish	186	Westmorland and Furness	Eden	North Westmorland; Rural District	
	Stainmore	Civil parish	253	Westmorland and Furness	Eden	North Westmorland; Rural District	
	Tebay	Civil parish	728	Westmorland and Furness	Eden	North Westmorland; Rural District	
	Temple Sowerby	Civil parish	333	Westmorland and Furness	Eden	North Westmorland; Rural District	
	Threlkeld	Civil parish	454	Westmorland and Furness	Eden	Penrith; Rural District	
	Waitby	Civil parish	60	Westmorland and Furness	Eden	North Westmorland; Rural District	
	Warcop	Civil parish	491	Westmorland and Furness	Eden	North Westmorland; Rural District	
	Wharton	Civil parish	31	Westmorland and Furness	Eden	North Westmorland; Rural District	
	Winton	Civil parish	213	Westmorland and Furness	Eden	North Westmorland; Rural District	
	Yanwath and Eamont Bridge	Civil parish	457	Westmorland and Furness	Eden	North Westmorland; Rural District	
	Aldingham	Civil parish	1,187	Westmorland and Furness	South Lakeland	North Lonsdale; Rural District	
	Angerton	Civil parish	14	Westmorland and Furness	South Lakeland	North Lonsdale; Rural District	
	Arnside	Civil parish	2,301	Westmorland and Furness	South Lakeland	South Westmorland; Rural District	
	Barbon	Civil parish	263	Westmorland and Furness	South Lakeland	South Westmorland; Rural District	
	Beetham	Civil parish	1,724	Westmorland and Furness	South Lakeland	South Westmorland; Rural District	
	Blawith and Subberthwaite	Civil parish	189	Westmorland and Furness	South Lakeland	North Lonsdale; Rural District	
	Broughton East	Civil parish	173	Westmorland and Furness	South Lakeland	North Lonsdale; Rural District	
	Broughton West	Civil parish	954	Westmorland and Furness	South Lakeland	North Lonsdale; Rural District	
	Burton-in-Kendal	Civil parish	1,411	Westmorland and Furness	South Lakeland	South Westmorland; Rural District	
	Cartmel Fell	Civil parish	309	Westmorland and Furness	South Lakeland	North Lonsdale; Rural District	
	Casterton	Civil parish	500	Westmorland and Furness	South Lakeland	South Westmorland; Rural District	
	Claife	Civil parish	392	Westmorland and Furness	South Lakeland	North Lonsdale; Rural District	
	Colton	Civil parish	765	Westmorland and Furness	South Lakeland	North Lonsdale; Rural District	
	Coniston	Civil parish	1,058	Westmorland and Furness	South Lakeland	North Lonsdale; Rural District	
	Crook	Civil parish	340	Westmorland and Furness	South Lakeland	South Westmorland; Rural District	
	Crosthwaite and Lyth	Civil parish	562	Westmorland and Furness	South Lakeland	South Westmorland; Rural District	
	Dent	Civil parish	675	Westmorland and Furness	South Lakeland	Sedbergh; Rural District	
	Docker	Civil parish	299	Westmorland and Furness	South Lakeland	South Westmorland; Rural District	
	Dunnerdale-with-Seathwaite	Civil parish	129	Westmorland and Furness	South Lakeland	North Lonsdale; Rural District	
	Egton with Newland	Civil parish	898	Westmorland and Furness	South Lakeland	North Lonsdale; Rural District	
	Firbank	Civil parish	97	Westmorland and Furness	South Lakeland	South Westmorland; Rural District	
	Garsdale	Civil parish	202	Westmorland and Furness	South Lakeland	Sedbergh; Rural District	
	Grange-over-Sands	Town	4,042	Westmorland and Furness	South Lakeland	Grange Urban District	
	Grayrigg	Civil parish	223	Westmorland and Furness	South Lakeland	South Westmorland; Rural District	
	Haverthwaite	Civil parish	728	Westmorland and Furness	South Lakeland	North Lonsdale; Rural District	
	Hawkshead	Civil parish	589	Westmorland and Furness	South Lakeland	North Lonsdale; Rural District	
	Helsington	Civil parish	288	Westmorland and Furness	South Lakeland	South Westmorland; Rural District	
	Heversham	Civil parish	647	Westmorland and Furness	South Lakeland	South Westmorland; Rural District	
	Hincaster	Civil parish	195	Westmorland and Furness	South Lakeland	South Westmorland; Rural District	
	Holme	Civil parish	1,167	Westmorland and Furness	South Lakeland	South Westmorland; Rural District	
	Hugill	Civil parish	416	Westmorland and Furness	South Lakeland	South Westmorland; Rural District	
	Hutton Roof	Civil parish	193	Westmorland and Furness	South Lakeland	South Westmorland; Rural District	
	Kendal	Town	27,505	Westmorland and Furness	South Lakeland	Kendal; Municipal Borough	
	Kentmere	Civil parish	95	Westmorland and Furness	South Lakeland	South Westmorland; Rural District	
	Killington	Civil parish	152	Westmorland and Furness	South Lakeland	South Westmorland; Rural District	
	Kirkby Ireleth	Civil parish	1,247	Westmorland and Furness	South Lakeland	North Lonsdale; Rural District	
	Kirkby Lonsdale	Town	1,771	Westmorland and Furness	South Lakeland	South Westmorland; Rural District	
	Lakes	Civil parish	5,127	Westmorland and Furness	South Lakeland	Lakes Urban District	
	Lambrigg	Civil parish	90	Westmorland and Furness	South Lakeland	South Westmorland; Rural District	
	Levens	Civil parish	1,007	Westmorland and Furness	South Lakeland	South Westmorland; Rural District	
	Lindale and Newton-in-Cartmel	Civil parish	824	Westmorland and Furness	South Lakeland	North Lonsdale; Rural District	
	Longsleddale	Civil parish	73	Westmorland and Furness	South Lakeland	South Westmorland; Rural District	
	Lower Allithwaite	Civil parish	1,758	Westmorland and Furness	South Lakeland	North Lonsdale; Rural District	
	Lower Holker	Civil parish	1,808	Westmorland and Furness	South Lakeland	North Lonsdale; Rural District	
	Lowick	Civil parish	224	Westmorland and Furness	South Lakeland	North Lonsdale; Rural District	
	Lupton	Civil parish	165	Westmorland and Furness	South Lakeland	South Westmorland; Rural District	
	Mansergh	Civil parish	141	Westmorland and Furness	South Lakeland	South Westmorland; Rural District	
	Mansriggs	Civil parish	42	Westmorland and Furness	South Lakeland	North Lonsdale; Rural District	
	Middleton	Civil parish	109	Westmorland and Furness	South Lakeland	South Westmorland; Rural District	
	Milnthorpe	Civil parish	2,106	Westmorland and Furness	South Lakeland	South Westmorland; Rural District	
	Natland	Civil parish	747	Westmorland and Furness	South Lakeland	South Westmorland; Rural District	
	Nether Staveley	Civil parish	677	Westmorland and Furness	South Lakeland	South Westmorland; Rural District	
	New Hutton	Civil parish	313	Westmorland and Furness	South Lakeland	South Westmorland; Rural District	
	Old Hutton and Holmescales	Civil parish	357	Westmorland and Furness	South Lakeland	South Westmorland; Rural District	
	Osmotherley	Civil parish	234	Westmorland and Furness	South Lakeland	North Lonsdale; Rural District	
	Over Staveley	Civil parish	516	Westmorland and Furness	South Lakeland	South Westmorland; Rural District	
	Pennington	Civil parish	1,794	Westmorland and Furness	South Lakeland	North Lonsdale; Rural District	
	Preston Patrick	Civil parish	438	Westmorland and Furness	South Lakeland	South Westmorland; Rural District	
	Preston Richard	Civil parish	1,307	Westmorland and Furness	South Lakeland	South Westmorland; Rural District	
	Satterthwaite	Civil parish	257	Westmorland and Furness	South Lakeland	North Lonsdale; Rural District	
	Sedbergh	Civil parish	2,705	Westmorland and Furness	South Lakeland	Sedbergh; Rural District	
	Sedgwick	Civil parish	380	Westmorland and Furness	South Lakeland	South Westmorland; Rural District	
	Selside and Fawcett Forest	Civil parish	317	Westmorland and Furness	South Lakeland	South Westmorland; Rural District	
	Skelsmergh and Scalthwaiterigg	Civil parish	374	Westmorland and Furness	South Lakeland	South Westmorland; Rural District	
	Skelwith	Civil parish	185	Westmorland and Furness	South Lakeland	North Lonsdale; Rural District	
	Stainton	Civil parish	301	Westmorland and Furness	South Lakeland	South Westmorland; Rural District	
	Staveley-in-Cartmel	Civil parish	428	Westmorland and Furness	South Lakeland	North Lonsdale; Rural District	
	Strickland Ketel	Civil parish	1,093	Westmorland and Furness	South Lakeland	South Westmorland; Rural District	
	Strickland Roger	Civil parish	544	Westmorland and Furness	South Lakeland	South Westmorland; Rural District	
	Torver	Civil parish	135	Westmorland and Furness	South Lakeland	North Lonsdale; Rural District	
	Ulverston	Town	11,524	Westmorland and Furness	South Lakeland	Ulverston; Urban District	
	Underbarrow and Bradleyfield	Civil parish	351	Westmorland and Furness	South Lakeland	South Westmorland; Rural District	
	Urswick	Civil parish	1,467	Westmorland and Furness	South Lakeland	North Lonsdale; Rural District	
	Whinfell	Civil parish	152	Westmorland and Furness	South Lakeland	South Westmorland; Rural District	
	Windermere and Bowness	Town	8,245	Westmorland and Furness	South Lakeland	Windermere Urban District	
	Witherslack, Meathop and Ulpha	Civil parish	625	Westmorland and Furness	South Lakeland	South Westmorland; Rural District	

== Ancient parishes and townships and their relationships to modern civil and ecclesiastical organisation ==
=== Cumberland ===
Wards of Cumberland

==== Allerdale Above Derwent ward ====
Ancient parish	Medieval townships	Civil parishes covering this area from 1866 on	Churches
Arlecdon	Arlecdon; Frizington; Whillimoor	Arlecdon [renamed Arlecdon & Frizington 1934] (1866-)	Arlecdon St Michael (ancient-); Frizington St Paul (1867-)
Beckermet St Bridget	Beckermet St Bridget	Beckermet St Bridget (1866-2011); Beckermet (2011-)	Beckermet St Bridget (ancient-); Calder Bridge St Bridget (1842-)
Beckermet St John	Beckermet St John	Beckermet St John (1866-2011); Beckermet (2011-)	Beckermet St John the Baptist (ancient-); Thornhill Mission Church (1932-)
Brigham	Blindbothel; Brackenthwaite; Brigham; Buttermere; Cockermouth; Eaglesfield; Embleton; Greysouthen; Lorton; Mosser; Setmurthy; Whinfell; Wythop	Blindbothel (1866-); Brackenthwaite (1866-1934); Brigham (1866-); Buttermere (1866-); Cockermouth (1866-); Dean (1934-) (Eaglesfield area); Eaglesfield (1866-1934); Embleton (1866-); Greysouthen (1866-); Lorton (1866-); Mosser (1866-1934); Setmurthy (1866-); Whinfell (1866-1934); Wythop (1866-)	Brigham St Bridget (ancient-); Brackenthwaite St Mary Magdalene (medieval-C16th); Buttermere St James (medieval-); Cockermouth All Saints (medieval-); Cockermouth St Helen (medieval); Cockermouth St Leonard (medieval); Cockermouth Christ Church (1865-); Eaglesfield St Philip (1891-); Embleton St Cuthbert (medieval-); Lorton St Cuthbert (medieval-); Mosser St Michael (medieval-); Setmurthy St Barnabas (medieval-); Wythop Old Chapel (C16th-19th); Wythop St Margaret (1865-)
Bootle	Bootle	Bootle (1866-)	Bootle St Michael (ancient-)
Cleator	Cleator	Cleator [renamed Cleator Moor 1934] (1866-)	Cleator St Leonard (ancient-); Cleator Moor St John the Evangelist (1872-2017); Wath Brow Mission Church (1881-2010)
Corney	Corney	Corney (1866-1934); Waberthwaite (1934-)	Corney St John the Baptist (ancient-)
Crosthwaite (part)	Borrowdale; Braithwaite; Coledale or Portinscale; Newlands or Rogersett; Thornthwaite	Above Derwent (1866-); Borrowdale (1866-)	Borrowdale St Andrew (C16th-); Braithwaite St Herbert (1900-); Grange Holy Trinity (1861-); Newlands Church (1571-); Thornthwaite St Mary (medieval-)
Dean	Branthwaite; Dean; Ullock, Pardshaw & Deanscales	Dean (1866-)	Dean St Oswald (ancient-)
Distington	Distington	Distington (1866-)	Distington Holy Spirit (ancient-)
Drigg and Carleton	Drigg & Carleton	Drigg & Carleton (1866-)	Drigg St Peter (ancient-)
Egremont	Egremont	Egremont (1866-)	Egremont SS Mary & Michael (medieval-); Bigrigg St John the Evangelist (1877-)
Gosforth	Boonwood & Seascale; Gosforth; High Bolton; Low Bolton	Gosforth (1866-); Seascale (1897-)	Gosforth St Mary (ancient-); Seascale St Cuthbert (1881-)
Haile	Haile; Wilton	Haile (1866-)	Haile Parish Church (ancient-)
Harrington	Harrington	Harrington (1866-1974); Lowca (1974-); (part of) Workington (1974-) (majority)	Harrington St Mary (ancient-)
Irton	Irton; Santon with Melthwaite	Irton with Santon (1866-)	Irton St Paul (ancient-)
Lamplugh	Kelton; Lamplugh; Murton; Winder	Lamplugh (1866-)	Lamplugh St Michael (ancient-); Kirkland Mission Church (1886-)
Millom	Birker and Austhwaite; Chapel Sucken; Millom Above; Millom Below; Thwaites; Ulpha	Birker & Austhwaite (1866-1934); Eskdale (1934-) (Birker & Austhwaite area); Millom (1866-); Millom Rural (renamed Millom Without 1934) (1894-); Ulpha (1866-)	Millom Holy Trinity (ancient-); Haverigg St Luke (1891-); Kirksanton Christ Church (1891-1950); Millom St George (1877-); Thwaites St Anne (1715-); Ulpha St John the Baptist (C16th-)
Moresby	Moresby; Parton	Moresby (1866-); Parton (1866-)	Moresby St Bridget (ancient-); Moresby Parks Mission Church (1902-2007)
Muncaster	Birkby; Muncaster	Muncaster (1866-)	Muncaster St Michael (ancient-)
Ponsonby	Ponsonby	Ponsonby (1866-)	Ponsonby Parish Church (medieval-)
St Bees	Eskdale; Ennerdale; Hensingham; Kinniside; Loweswater; Lowside Quarter; Nether Wasdale; Preston Quarter; Rottington; Sandwith; St Bees; Wasdale Head; Weddicar; Whitehaven	Ennerdale & Kinniside (1866-); Eskdale & Wasdale (1866-1934); Eskdale (1934-); Hensingham (1866-1934); Loweswater (1866-); Lowside Quarter (1866-); Nether Wasdale [renamed Wasdale 2000] (1866-); Preston Quarter (1866-1896); Rottington (1866-1974); Sandwith (1866-1934); St Bees (1866-); Weddicar (1866-); Whitehaven (1866-)	St Bees SS Mary & Bega (ancient-); Ennerdale Bridge St Mary (medieval-); Eskdale St Catherine (medieval-); Eskdale St Bega (1890-); Hensingham St John the Evangelist (1791-); Kells St Peter (1908-); Loweswater St Bartholomew (medieval-); Mirehouse St Andrew (1955-); Nether Wasdale St Michael (C16th-); Wasdale Head St Olaf (C16th-); Whitehaven St Nicholas (medieval-); Whitehaven Holy Trinity (1714-1949); Whitehaven St James (1752-); Whitehaven Christ Church (1847-1977)
Waberthwaite	Waberthwaite	Waberthwaite (1866-)	Waberthwaite St John the Baptist (ancient-)
Whicham	Whicham	Whicham (1866-)	Whicham St Mary (medieval-)
Whitbeck	Whitbeck	Whitbeck (1866-1934); Whicham (1934-)	Whitbeck St Mary (medieval-)
Workington	Great Clifton; Little Clifton; Stainburn; Winscales; Workington	Great Clifton (1866-); Little Clifton (1866-); Stainburn (1866-1934); Winscales (1866-); Workington (1866-); Workington Rural (1894-1934)	Workington St Michael (ancient-); Clifton St Luke (medieval-); Workington St Mary (1889-); Workington St John the Evangelist (1823-)
Cloffocks (extra-parochial)		Cloffocks (1866-1934); Workington (1934-)	
Low Keekle (extra-parochial)		Low Keekle (1866-1881); Hensingham (1881-1934); Weddicar (1934-)	Keekle Mission Church (1875-2013)
Salter & Eskett (extra-parochial)		Salter & Eskett (1866-1934); Lamplugh (1934-)	
Ancient parish	Medieval townships	Civil parishes covering this area from 1866 on	Churches

==== Allerdale Below Derwent ward ====
Ancient parish	Medieval townships	Civil parishes covering this area from 1866 on	Churches
Allhallows	Allhallows	Allhallows (1866-)	Allhallows All Saints (ancient-)
Aspatria	Aspatria & Brayton; Hayton & Mealo; Oughterside & Allerby	Aspatria & Brayton [renamed Aspatria 1934] (1866-); Hayton & Mealo (1866-); Oughterside & Allerby (1866-)	Aspatria St Kentigern (ancient-); Hayton St James (1868-)
Bassenthwaite	Highside; Lowside	Bassenthwaite (1866-)	Bassenthwaite St Bega (ancient-); Bassenthwaite St John (medieval-)
Bolton(s)	Bolton High; Bolton Low	Bolton High (1866-1887); Bolton Low (1866-1887); Boltons (1887-)	Bolton All Saints (ancient-)
Bridekirk	Bridekirk; Dovenby; Great Broughton; Little Broughton; Papcastle; Ribton; Tallentire	Bridekirk (1866-); Broughton (1898-); Broughton Moor (1898-); Camerton (1934-) (Ribton area); Dovenby (1866-1934); Great Broughton (1866-1898); Little Broughton (1866-1898); Papcastle (1866-); Ribton (1866-1934); Tallentire (1866-1934)	Bridekirk St Bridget (ancient-); Broughton Christ Church (1856-); Broughton Moor St Columba (1905-2019); Great Broughton St Lawrence (C17th); Papcastle Mission Church (1875-2002)
Bromfield (part)	Allonby; Bromfield; Langrigg & Mealrigg; Westnewton	Allonby (1894-); Bromfield (1866-); Langrigg & Mealrigg (1866-1934); West Newton & Allonby (1866-1894); Westnewton (1894-)	Bromfield St Kentigern (ancient-); Allonby Christ Church (1744-); Westnewton St Matthew (1857-)
Caldbeck	Caldbeck Haltcliff; High Caldbeck; Low Caldbeck; Mosedale	Caldbeck (1866-); Mosedale (1866-1934); Mungrisdale (1934-) (Mosedale area)	Caldbeck St Kentigern (ancient-)
Camerton	Camerton; Flimby (parish by 1829); Seaton	Camerton (1866-); Flimby (1866-1974); Maryport (1974-) (Flimby area); Seaton (1866-)	Camerton St Peter (ancient-); Flimby St Nicholas (medieval-); Seaton St Paul (1881-); West Seaton Holy Trinity (1893-2015)
Crosscanonby	Birkby; Crosby; Crosscanonby; Netherhall	Crosscanonby (1866-); Maryport (1928-) (Netherhall area); Netherhall (1894-1928)	Crosscanonby St John the Evangelist (ancient-); Maryport St Mary (1760-); Maryport Christ Church (1872-2013)
Crosthwaite (part)	Keswick; St John's in the Vale; Underskiddaw; Wythburn	Keswick (1866-); St John's, Castlerigg & Wythburn (1866-); Underskiddaw (1866-)	Crosthwaite St Kentigern (ancient-); Keswick St John the Evangelist (1838-); St-John's-in-the-Vale St John (C16th-); Underskiddaw Mission Church (1829-); Wythburn Church (C16th-)
Dearham	Dearham; Ellenborough & Ewanrigg	Dearham (1866-); Ellenborough & Ewanrigg (1866-1928); Maryport (1928-) (E&E area)	Dearham St Kentigern (ancient-); Netherton All Souls (1886-)
Gilcrux	Gilcrux	Gilcrux (1866-)	Gilcrux St Mary (ancient-)
Holme Cultram	Holme Abbey; Holme East Waver; Holme Low; Holme St Cuthbert; Skinburness Marsh	Holme Abbey (1866-); Holme East Waver (1866-); Holme Low (1866-); Holme St Cuthbert (1866-); Silloth-on-Solway (1934-)	Abbeytown St Mary (ancient-); Causewayhead St Paul (1845-2016); Newton Arlosh St John the Evangelist (medieval; 1843-); Rowks St Cuthbert (1845-); Silloth Christ Church (1870-)
Ireby	High Ireby; Low Ireby	High Ireby (1866-1934); Low Ireby (1866-1934); Ireby & Uldale (1934-)	Ireby Old Church (ancient-1971); Ireby St James (1845-)
Isel	Blindcrake, Isel & Redmain; Isel Old Park; Sunderland	Blindcrake (1934-); Blindcrake, Isel & Redmain (1866-1934); Isel Old Park (1866-1934); Sunderland (1866-1934)	Isel St Michael (ancient-)
Plumbland	Plumbland	Plumbland (1866-)	Plumbland St Cuthbert (medieval-)
Torpenhow	Bewaldeth & Snittlegarth; Blennerhasset & Kirkland; Bothel & Threapland; Torpenhow & Whitrigg	Bewaldeth & Snittlegarth (1866-); Blennerhasset & Kirkland (1866-1934); Blennerhasset & Torpenhow (1934-); Bothel & Threapland (1866-); Torpenhow & Whitrigg (1866-1934)	Torpenhow St Michael (medieval-)
Uldale	Uldale	Uldale (1866-1934); Ireby & Uldale (1934-)	Uldale St James (medieval-); Uldale St John the Evangelist (1869-1963)
Westward	Brocklebanks & Stoneraise; Rosley & Woodside	Westward (1866-)	Westward Old St Hilda (medieval); Westward St Hilda (1560-); Rosley Holy Trinity (1840-)
Briery Cottages (extra-parochial)		Briery Cottages (1866-1894); Keswick (1894-)	
Skiddaw (extra-parochial)		Skiddaw (1866-1934); Underskiddaw (1934-)	
Ancient parish	Medieval townships	Civil parishes covering this area from 1866 on	Churches

==== Cumberland ward ====
Ancient parish	Medieval townships	Civil parishes covering this area from 1866 on	Churches
Aikton	Aikton; Biglands & Gamelsby; Wampool; Wiggonby	Aikton (1866-)	Aikton St Andrew (ancient-)
Beaumont	Beaumont	Beaumont (1866-)	Beaumont St Mary (ancient-)
Bowness on Solway	Anthorn; Bowness; Drumburgh; Fingland	Bowness (1866-)	Bowness St Michael (ancient-)
Bromfield (part)	Blencogo; Dundraw	Blencogo (1866-1934); Bromfield (1934-) (Blencogo area); Dundraw (1866-)	
Burgh by Sands	Boustead Hill; Burgh Head; Burgh West End; Longburgh; Moorhouse	Burgh-by-Sands (1866-)	Burgh-by-Sands St Michael (ancient-)
Carlisle St Cuthbert	Botcherby; Botchergate; Brisco; Carleton; Harraby; High Blackwell; Low Blackwell; St Cuthbert Within; Upperby	Botchergate (1894-1904); Carlisle (1904-); St Cuthbert Within (1866-1904); St Cuthbert Without (1866-)	Carlisle St Cuthbert (ancient-); Carlisle Christ Church (1828-1938); Carlisle St Stephen (1865-1964); Carlisle St John the Evangelist (1867-); Carlisle St Andrew (1890-); Carlisle St Herbert (1932-); Harraby St Elisabeth (1954-); Upperby St John the Baptist (1840-)
Carlisle St Mary (most)	Caldewgate; Cummersdale; Rickergate; St Mary Within; Wreay	Belle Vue (1894-1912); Caldewgate (1866-1904); Carlisle (1904-); Cummersdale (1866-); Rickergate (1866-1904); St Cuthbert Without (1934-) (Wreay area); St Mary Within (1866-1904); Wreay (1866-1934)	Carlisle Cathedral of St Mary (ancient-); Carlisle Holy Trinity Chapel (medieval); Carlisle St Alban (medieval-1549); Carlisle Holy Trinity Church (1830-2022); Carlisle St James (1867-); Carlisle St Paul (1869-1979); Carlisle Church of St Mary (1870-1954); Carlisle St Barnabas (1899-); Carlisle St Aidan (1899-); Carlisle St Luke (1958-); Cummersdale St James (1927-2023); Wreay St Mary (medieval-)
Dalston	Buckabank; Cumdivock; Dalston; Hawksdale; Ivegill or Highhead; Raughton & Gaitsgill	Dalston (1866-)	Dalston St Michael (ancient-); Cumdivock St John the Evangelist (1870-); Gaitsgill St Jude (1869-1970); Highhead Chapel (medieval-1974); Ivegill Christ Church (1868-); Raughton Head All Saints (medieval-)
Grinsdale	Grinsdale	Grinsdale (1866-1934); Beaumont (1934-)	Grinsdale St Kentigern (medieval-2001)
Kirkandrews on Eden	Kirkandrews on Eden	Beaumont (1934-); Kirkandrews on Eden (1866-1934)	Kirkandrews-on-Eden St Andrew (ancient-1692)
Kirkbampton	Great Bampton; Little Bampton; Oughterby	Kirkbampton (1866-)	Kirkbampton St Peter (ancient-)
Kirkbride	Kirkbride	Kirkbride (1866-)	Kirkbride St Bridget (ancient-)
Orton (Cumberland)	Baldwinholme; Great Orton	Orton (1866-)	Orton St Giles (ancient-)
Rockcliffe	Rockcliffe Castletown; Rockcliffe Churchtown	Rockcliffe (1866-)	Rockcliffe St Mary (medieval-)
Sebergham	High Bound; Low Bound	Sebergham (1866-)	Sebergham St Mary (medieval-); Welton St James (1874-)
Thursby	Crofton; High & Low Thursby; Parton & Micklethwaite	Thursby (1866-)	Thursby St Andrew (medieval-)
Warwick	Aglionby; Warwick	Warwick (1866-1934); Wetheral (1934-)	Warwick-on-Eden St Leonard (medieval-2017)
Wetheral	Cotehill & Cumwhinton; Scotby; Warwick Bridge & Great Corby; Wetheral	Wetheral (1866-)	Wetheral Holy Trinity (medieval-); Cotehill St John the Evangelist (1868-); Scotby All Saints (1854-); Warwick Bridge St Paul (1845-)
Wigton	Oulton; Waverton; Wigton; Woodside Quarter	Oulton (1866-1934); Waverton (1866-); Wigton (1866-1887, 1894-); Wigton cum Woodside (1887-94); Woodside (1866-1887, 1894-)	Wigton St Mary (medieval-); Waverton Christ Church (1865-2023)
Eaglesfield Abbey (extra-parochial)		Carlisle (1904-); Eaglesfield Abbey (1866-1904)	
Ancient parish	Medieval townships	Civil parishes covering this area from 1866 on	Churches

==== Eskdale ward ====
Ancient parish	Medieval townships	Civil parishes covering this area from 1866 on	Churches
Arthuret	Brackenhill; Lineside; Longtown; Netherby	Arthuret (1866-)	Arthuret St Michael (ancient-)
Bewcastle	Bailey; Bellbank; Bewcastle; Nixons	Bewcastle (1866-)	Bewcastle St Cuthbert (ancient-)
Brampton	Brampton; Easby; Naworth	Brampton (1866-); Easby (1866-1883); Naworth (1866-1883)	Brampton Old Church (ancient-1978); Brampton St Martin (1788-)
Castle Carrock	Castle Carrock	Castle Carrock (1866-)	Castle Carrock St Peter (ancient-)
Crosby on Eden	Brunstock; High Crosby; Low Crosby; Walby	Crosby-upon-Eden (1866-1934); Stanwix (1934-1966); Stanwix Rural (1966-); Wetheral (1934-)	Crosby-on-Eden St John the Evangelist (medieval-)
Cumrew	Cumrew Inside; Cumrew Outside	Cumrew (1866-)	Cumrew St Mary (ancient-)
Cumwhitton	Cumwhitton; Northsceugh with Moorthwaite	Cumwhitton (1866-)	Cumwhitton St Mary (ancient-)
Easton [till late C14]		(part of) Arthuret (1866-)	Easton Parish Church (medieval)
Farlam	East Farlam; West Farlam	Farlam (1866-)	Farlam St Thomas a Becket (medieval-); Tindale Mission Church (?-)
Hayton	Fenton & Faugh; Hayton; Little Corby; Talkin	Hayton (1866-)	Hayton St Mary Magdalene (ancient-); Talkin Chapel (1842-)
Irthington	Irthington; Laversdale; Newby; Newtown	Irthington (1866-)	Irthington St Kentigern (ancient-)
Kirkandrews on Esk	Kirkandrews Middle; Kirkandrews Moat; Kirkandrews Nether; Nicholforest	Kirkandrews (1934-); Kirkandrews Middle (1866-1934); Kirkandrews Moat (1866-1934); Kirkandrews Nether (1866-1934); Nicholforest (1866-)	Kirkandrews-on-Esk St Andrew (medieval-C16th, 1637-); Nicholforest St Nicholas (C17th-)
Kirkcambeck [till late C14]		(part of) Lanercost (1866-)	Kirkcambeck St Kentigern (medieval-C20th)
Kirklinton	Blackford; Hethersgill; Kirklinton Middle Quarter; Westlinton	Hethersgill (1866-); Kirklinton Middle (1866-); Westlinton (1866-)	Kirklinton St Cuthbert (ancient-); Hethersgill St Mary (1876-); Blackford St John the Baptist (1871-)
Lanercost	Askerton; Banks; Burtholme; Kingwater; Waterhead	Askerton (1866-); Burtholme (1866-); Kingwater (1866-); Waterhead (1866-)	Lanercost St Mary Magdalene (ancient-); Gilsland St Mary Magdalene (1852-); Lees Hill Mission Church
Nether Denton	Nether Denton	Nether Denton (1866-)	Nether Denton St Cuthbert (ancient-)
Scaleby	East Scaleby; West Scaleby	Scaleby (1866-)	Scaleby All Saints (medieval-)
Stanwix	Cargo; Etterby; Houghton; Linstock; Rickerby; Stainton; Stanwix; Tarraby	Stanwix (renamed Stanwix Rural 1966) (1866-)	Stanwix St Michael (ancient-); Belah St Mark (1951-); Houghton St John the Evangelist (1839-); Linstock St Peter (medieval)
Stapleton	Bellbank; Solport; Stapleton; Trough	Bellbank (1866-1934); Solport (1866-); Stapleton (1866-); Trough (1866-1934)	Stapleton St Mary (medieval-)
Upper Denton	Upper Denton	Upper Denton (1866-)	Upper Denton Parish Church (medieval-1970s)
Walton	High Walton; Low Walton	Walton (1866-)	Walton St Mary (medieval-)
Carlatton (extra-parochial)		Carlatton (1866-)	
Geltsdale (extra-parochial)		Castle Carrock (2003-); Geltsdale (1866-2003)	
Kingmoor (extra-parochial)		Kingmoor (1866-)	Kingmoor St Peter (1930-)
Midgeholme (extra-parochial)		Midgeholme (1883-)	
Ancient parish	Medieval townships	Civil parishes covering this area from 1866 on	Churches

==== Leath ward ====
Ancient parish	Medieval townships	Civil parishes covering this area from 1866 on	Churches
Addingham	Gamblesby; Glassonby; Hunsonby & Winskill; Little Salkeld	Gamblesby (1866-1934); Glassonby (1866-); Hunsonby & Winskill (1866-1934); Little Salkeld (1866-1934); Hunsonby (1934-)	Addingham Old St Michael (medieval); Addingham St Michael (C16th-); Gamblesby St John the Evangelist (1868-2002); Hunsonby Mission Church (1905-1975); Little Salkeld Mission Church (C19th-1970)
Ainstable	Ainstable	Ainstable (1866-)	Ainstable St Michael (ancient-)
Alston Moor	Alston	Alston with Garrigill [renamed Alston Moor 1974] (1866-)	Alston St Augustine (ancient-); Garrigill St John (medieval-); Nenthead St James (1845-)
Carlisle St Mary (part)	Middlesceugh & Braithwaite	Middlesceugh & Braithwaite (1866-1934); Skelton (1934-)	
Castle Sowerby	Bustabeck; Howbound; Rowbound; Southernby; Stockdalewath	Castle Sowerby (1866-)	Castle Sowerby St Kentigern (ancient-); Raughton Head All Saints (1678-)
Croglin	Croglin; Newbiggin	(small part of) Ainstable (1934-); Croglin (1866-1934); (part of) Cumrew (1934-)	Croglin St John the Baptist (medieval-2012)
Dacre	Dacre; Great Blencow; Newbiggin; Soulby; Stainton	Dacre (1866-)	Dacre St Andrew (ancient-)
Edenhall	Edenhall	Edenhall (1866-1934); Langwathby (1934-)	Edenhall St Cuthbert (ancient-)
Great Salkeld	Great Salkeld	Great Salkeld (1866-)	Great Salkeld St Cuthbert (medieval-)
Greystoke	Berrier & Murrah; Bowscale; Greystoke; Hutton John; Hutton Roof; Hutton Soil; Johnby; Little Blencow; Matterdale; Motherby & Gill; Mungrisdale; Threlkeld; Watermillock	Berrier & Murrah (1866-1934); Bowscale (1866-1934); Greystoke (1866-); Hutton (1934-); Hutton John (1866-1934); Hutton Roof (1866-1934); Hutton Soil (1866-1934); Matterdale (1866-); Mungrisdale (1866-); Threlkeld (1866-); Watermillock (1866-1934)	Greystoke St Andrew (ancient-); Matterdale Church (C16th-); Mungrisdale St Kentigern (medieval-); Penruddock All Saints (1902-); Threlkeld St Mary (medieval-); Watermillock All Saints (medieval-)
Hesket in the Forest	Calthwaite; High and Low Hesket; Itonfield; Petteril Crooks; Plumpton Street	Hesket in the Forest (1866-1934); Hesket (1934-)	Hesket St Mary (medieval-); Armathwaite Christ & St Mary (medieval-); Calthwaite All Saints (1913-)
Hutton in the Forest	Hutton in the Forest; Thomas Close	Hutton-in-the-Forest (1866-1934); Skelton (1934-)	Hutton St James (ancient-)
Kirkland	Culgaith; Kirkland & Blencarn; Skirwith	Culgaith (1866-); Kirkland & Blencarn (1866-1934); Skirwith (1866-1934)	Kirkland St Lawrence (ancient-); Culgaith All Saints (medieval-); Skirwith St John the Evangelist (1856-)
Kirkoswald	Kirkoswald; Staffield	Kirkoswald (1866-); Staffield (1866-1934)	Kirkoswald St Oswald (ancient-)
Langwathby	Langwathby	Langwathby (1866-)	Langwathby St Peter (ancient-)
Lazonby	Lazonby; Plumpton Wall	Hesket (1934-) (Plumpton Wall area); Lazonby (1866-); Plumpton Wall (1866-1934)	Lazonby St Nicholas (ancient-); Plumpton Wall St John the Evangelist (1767-)
Melmerby	Melmerby	Melmerby (1866-1934, 2019-); Ousby (1934-2019)	Melmerby St John the Baptist (medieval-)
Newton Reigny	Catterlen; Newton Reigny	Catterlen (1866-); Newton Reigny (1866-1934)	Newton Reigny St John (medieval-)
Ousby	Ousby	Ousby (1866-)	Ousby St Luke (medieval-)
Penrith	Penrith	Penrith (1866-)	Penrith St Andrew (ancient-); Penrith Christ Church (1850-)
Renwick	Renwick	Renwick (1866-1934); Kirkoswald (1934-)	Renwick All Saints (medieval-)
Skelton	Lamonby; Skelton; Unthank	Skelton (1866-)	Skelton St Michael (medieval-)
Ancient parish	Medieval townships	Civil parishes covering this area from 1866 on	Churches

==== Medieval parishes and chapelries ====
The following lists parishes by ward and includes chapelries in italics.

Ward	Parishes
Allerdale Above Derwent	Arlecdon • Beckermet St Bridget • Beckermet St John • Brigham (Brackenthwaite • Buttermere • Cockermouth All Saints • Cockermouth St Helen • Cockermouth St Leonard • Embleton • Lorton • Mosser • Setmurthy) • Bootle • Cleator • Corney • Dean • Distington • Drigg • Egremont • Gosforth • Haile • Harrington • Irton • Lamplugh • Millom • Moresby • Muncaster • Ponsonby • St Bees (Ennerdale Bridge • Eskdale • Loweswater • Whitehaven) • Thornthwaite^{1} • Waberthwaite • Whicham • Whitbeck • Workington (Clifton)
Allerdale Below Derwent	Allhallows • Aspatria • Bassenthwaite (Bassenthwaite St John) • Bolton • Bridekirk • Bromfield • Caldbeck • Camerton (Flimby) • Crosscanonby • Crosthwaite • Dearham • Gilcrux • Holme Cultram (Newton Arlosh) • Ireby • Isel • Plumbland • Torpenhow • Uldale • Westward
Cumberland	Aikton • Beaumont • Bowness • Burgh-by-Sands • Carlisle St Cuthbert • Carlisle St Mary (Carlisle Holy Trinity • Carlisle St Alban • Wreay) • Dalston (Highhead • Raughton Head) • Grinsdale • Kirkandrews-on-Eden • Kirkbampton • Kirkbride • Orton • Rockcliffe • Sebergham • Thursby • Warwick-on-Eden • Wetheral • Wigton
Eskdale	Arthuret • Bewcastle • Brampton • Castle Carrock • Crosby-on-Eden • Cumrew • Cumwhitton • Easton • Farlam • Hayton • Irthington • Kirkandrews-on-Esk • Kirkcambeck • Kirklinton • Lanercost • Nether Denton • Scaleby • Stanwix (Linstock) • Stapleton • Upper Denton • Walton
Leath	Addingham • Ainstable • Alston (Garrigill) • Castle Sowerby • Croglin • Dacre • Edenhall • Great Salkeld • Greystoke (Mungrisdale • Threlkeld • Watermillock) • Hesket-in-the-Forest (Armathwaite) • Hutton-in-the-Forest • Kirkland (Culgaith) • Kirkoswald • Langwathby • Lazonby • Melmerby • Newton Reigny • Ousby • Penrith • Renwick • Skelton

^{1}chapelry to Crosthwaite in Allerdale Below Derwent ward

=== Westmorland ===
==== East ward ====
Ancient parish	Medieval townships	Civil parishes covering this area from 1866 on	Churches
Appleby St Lawrence (from c. 1150)	Boroughgate; Burrells; Colby; Drybeck; Hoff & Hoff Row; Scattergate	(part of) Appleby-in-Westmorland (1894-); Appleby St Lawrence (1866-1894); Colby (1894-); Hoff (1894-)	Appleby St Lawrence (medieval-); Colby Mission Church (C19-20th)
Appleby St Michael	Bongate; Crackenthorpe; Hilton; Murton	(part of) Appleby-in-Westmorland (1894-); Appleby St Michael (1866-1894); Bongate (1894-1908); Crackenthorpe (1894-); Murton (1894-)	Appleby St Michael (ancient-1974); Murton-cum-Hilton St John the Baptist (1856-)
Asby	Asby Coatsforth; Asby Winderwath; Little Asby	Asby (1866-)	Asby St Peter (ancient-); Little Asby St Leonard (medieval)
Brough (from C16th)	Brough Sowerby; Church Brough; Hillbeck; Market Brough; Stainmore	Brough (1866-); Brough Sowerby (1866-); Hillbeck [renamed Helbeck 1974] (1866-); Stainmore (1866-)	Brough St Michael (ancient-); Market Brough SS Mary & Gabriel (C16-17th); Stainmore St Mary (1861-1972); Stainmore St Stephen (1608-)
Crosby Garrett	Crosby Garrett; Little Musgrave	Crosby Garrett (1866-); Little Musgrave (1866-1894); Musgrave (1894-) (Little Musgrave area)	Crosby Garrett St Andrew (ancient-)
Dufton	Dufton	Dufton (1866-)	Dufton St Cuthbert (ancient-)
Great Musgrave	Great Musgrave	Great Musgrave (1866-1894); Musgrave (1894-)	Great Musgrave St Theobald (medieval-)
Kirkby Stephen	Hartley; Kaber; Kirkby Stephen; Mallerstang; Nateby; Smardale; Soulby; Waitby; Wharton; Winton	Hartley (1866-); Kaber (1866-); Kirkby Stephen (1866-); Mallerstang (1866-); Nateby (1866-); Smardale (1866-1895); Soulby (1866-); Waitby (1866-); Wharton (1866-); Winton (1866-)	Kirkby Stephen Parish Church (ancient-); Mallerstang St Mary (medieval-); Soulby St Luke (C17th-2005)
Kirkby Thore	Kirkby Thore; Milburn; Temple Sowerby	Kirkby Thore (1866-); Milburn (1866-); Temple Sowerby (1866-)	Kirkby Thore St Michael (ancient-); Milburn St Cuthbert (medieval-); Temple Sowerby St James (medieval-)
Long Marton	Brampton; Knock; Long Marton	Long Marton (1866-)	Long Marton SS Margaret & James (ancient-); Knock Mission Church (1905-?)
Newbiggin	Newbiggin	Newbiggin (1866-)	Newbiggin St Edmund (medieval-)
Ormside	Great Ormside; Little Ormside	Ormside (1866-)	Ormside St James (medieval-)
Orton (Westmorland)	Bretherdale; Langdale; Orton; Raisbeck; Tebay	Orton (1866-); Tebay (1897-)	Orton All Saints (ancient-); Tebay St James (1880-)
Ravenstonedale	Ravenstonedale	Ravenstonedale (1866-)	Ravenstonedale St Oswald (medieval-); Newbiggin-on-Lune St Aidan (1892-1984)
Birkbeck Fells (extra-parochial)		(part of) Crosby Ravensworth (1866-); (part of) Orton (1866-)	
Ancient parish	Medieval townships	Civil parishes covering this area from 1866 on	Churches

==== Kendal ward ====
Ancient parish	Medieval townships	Civil parishes covering this area from 1866 on	Churches
Beetham	Beetham; Farleton; Haverbrack; Meathop & Ulpha; Witherslack	Arnside (1897-); Beetham (1866-); Farleton (1866-1934); Haverbrack (1866-1934); Meathop & Ulpha (1866-2015); Witherslack (1866-2015); Witherslack, Meathop & Ulpha (2015-)	Beetham St Michael (ancient-); Arnside St James (1864-); Storth All Saints/Village Church (1897-); Witherslack St Paul (C16th-)
Bowness on Windermere (from 1348)	Ambleside Below Stock; Applethwaite; Troutbeck; Undermillbeck (part)	Ambleside (1866-1974) (Ambleside Below Stock area); Applethwaite (1866-1894); Bowness-on-Windemere (1894-1905, 1934-1974); Crook (1934-) (part of Undermillbeck area); Lakes (1974-) (Ambleside Below Stock and Troutbeck areas); Troutbeck (1866-1974); Undermillbeck (1866-1934); Windermere [renamed Windermere and Bowness 2020] (1894-)	Bowness St Martin (medieval-); Ambleside St Mary (1854-); Applethwaite St Catherine (medieval-C18th); Troutbeck Jesus Church (medieval-); Windermere St John the Evangelist (1886-1995); Windermere St Mary (1847-)
Burton (part)	Old Hutton & Holmescales (part); Preston Patrick	(part of) Old Hutton & Holmescales (1866-); Preston Patrick (1866-)	Preston Patrick St Patrick (medieval-)
Grasmere (from C16th)	Ambleside Above Stock; Grasmere; Langdales; Rydal & Loughrigg	Ambleside (1866-1974) (Ambleside Above Stock area); Grasmere (1866-1974); Lakes (1974-); Langdale (1866-1974); Rydal & Loughrigg (1866-1974)	Grasmere St Oswald (ancient-); Ambleside St Anne (medieval-1984); Great Langdale Holy Trinity (C16th-); Little Langdale Mission Church (C19th-); Rydal St Mary (1823-)
Heversham	Crosscrake; Crosthwaite; Heversham with Milnthorpe; Hincaster; Levens; Preston Richard; Sedgwick; Stainton	Crosthwaite & Lyth (1866-); Heversham (1866-); Hincaster (1866-); Levens (1866-); Milnthorpe (1896-); Preston Richard (1866-); Sedgwick (1866-); Stainton (1866-)	Heversham St Peter (ancient-); Crosscrake St Thomas (medieval, 1773-); Crosthwaite St Mary (medieval-); Levens St John the Evangelist (1827-); Milnthorpe St Thomas (1837-)
Kendal	Burneside; Crook; Docker; Fawcett Forest; Grayrigg; Helsington; Hugill; Kirkby Kendal; Kentmere; Kirkland; Lambrigg; Longsleddale; Natland; Nether Graveship; Nether Staveley; New Hutton; Old Hutton and Holmescales (part); Over Staveley; Patton; Scalthwaiterigg, Hay & Hutton-in-the-Hay; Skelsmergh; Strickland Ketel; Strickland Roger; Underbarrow & Bradleyfield; Undermillbeck (Winster area); Whinfell; Whitwell and Selside	Crook (1866-); Dillicar (1866-1986); Docker (1866-); Fawcett Forest (1866-2020); Grayrigg (1866-); Helsington (1866-); Hugill (1866-); Kendal (1866-); Kentmere (1866-); Kirkland (1866-1908); Lambrigg (1866-); Longsleddale (1866-); Natland (1866-); Nether Graveship (1866-1908); Nether Staveley (1866-); New Hutton (1866-); (part of) Old Hutton & Holmescales (1866-); Over Staveley (1866-); Patton (1866-1986); Scalthwaiterigg, Hay & Hutton-in-the-Hay (1866-1897); Scalthwaiterigg (1897-2015); Selside & Fawcett Forest (2020-); Skelsmergh (1866-2015); Skelsmergh & Scalthwaiterigg (2015-); Strickland Ketel (1866-); Strickland Roger (1866-); Underbarrow & Bradleyfield (1866-); Whinfell (1866-); Whitwell & Selside (1866-2020)	Kendal Holy Trinity (ancient-); Burneside St Oswald (medieval-); Crook St Catherine (medieval-); Grayrigg St John the Evangelist (medieval-); Helsington St John the Evangelist (1726-); Ings St Anne (1635-); Kendal All Hallows (medieval; 1866-2002); Kendal St Thomas (1837-); Kendal St George (1755-); Kentmere St Cuthbert (medieval-); Longsleddale St Mary (C16th-); Natland St Mark (medieval; 1735-); New Hutton St Stephen (1739-); Old Hutton St John the Baptist (medieval-); Over Staveley St James (1865-); Over Staveley St Margaret (medieval-C18th); Selside St Thomas (C17th-); Skelsmergh St John the Baptist (C16-17th, 1871-); Underbarrow All Saints (C16th-); Winster Holy Trinity (medieval-)
Ancient parish	Medieval townships	Civil parishes covering this area from 1866 on	Churches

==== Lonsdale ward ====
Ancient parish	Medieval townships	Civil parishes covering this area from 1866 on	Churches
Burton (part)	Burton; Dalton (in Lancs); Holme	Burton-in-Kendal (1866-); Dalton (1866-1986) (in Lancashire until 1895); Holme (1866-)	Burton St James (ancient-); Holme Holy Trinity (1839-)
Kendal (part)	Dillicar	Dillicar (1866-1986); Grayrigg (1986-)	
Kirkby Lonsdale	Barbon; Casterton; Firbank; Hutton Roof; Killington; Kirkby Lonsdale; Lupton; Mansergh; Middleton	Barbon (1866-); Casterton (1866-); Firbank (1866-); Hutton Roof (1866-); Killington (1866-); Kirkby Lonsdale (1866-); Lupton (1866-); Mansergh (1866-); Middleton (1866-)	Kirkby Lonsdale St Mary (ancient-); Barbon St Bartholomew (medieval-); Casterton St Columba (medieval-C17th); Casterton Holy Trinity (1831-); Firbank St John the Evangelist (1841-); Hutton Roof St John the Divine (medieval-); Killington All Saints (medieval-); Lupton All Saints (1868-); Mansergh St Peter (1726-); Middleton Holy Ghost (C17th-)

==== West ward ====
Ancient parish	Medieval townships	Civil parishes covering this area from 1866 on	Churches
Askham	Askham; Helton	Askham (1866-)	Askham St Peter (medieval-)
Bampton	Bampton	Bampton (1866-)	Bampton St Patrick (medieval-)
Barton	High Barton; Low Winder; Martindale; Patterdale with Hartsop; Sockbridge; Yanwath & Eamont Bridge	Barton [renamed Barton & Pooley Bridge 2019] (1894-); High Barton (1866-1894); Low Winder (1866-1894); Martindale (1866-); Patterdale [aka Petterdale with Hartsop] (1866-); Sockbridge [later Sockbridge & Tirril] (1866-); Yanwath & Eamont Bridge (1866-)	Barton St Michael (ancient-); Eamont Bridge St John (1871-1932); Martindale St Martin (medieval-); Martindale St Peter (1880-); Patterdale St Patrick (medieval-); Pooley Bridge St Paul (1867-)
Brougham	Brougham	Brougham (1866-)	Brougham St Ninian (ancient-1977); Brougham St Wilfrid (medieval-2023)
Cliburn	Cliburn	Cliburn (1866-)	Cliburn St Cuthbert (ancient-)
Clifton	Clifton	Clifton (1866-)	Clifton St Cuthbert (ancient-)
Crosby Ravensworth	Crosby Ravensworth; Maulds Meaburn; Reagill	Crosby Ravensworth (1866-)	Crosby Ravensworth St Lawrence (ancient-)
Lowther	Hackthorpe; Lowther; Melkinthorpe; Whale	Lowther (1866-)	Lowther St Michael (ancient-2024)
Morland	Bolton; Great Strickland; Kings Meaburn; Little Strickland; Morland; Newby; Sleagill; Thrimby	Bolton (1866-); Great Strickland (1866-); King's Meaburn (1866-); Little Strickland (1866-); Morland (1866-); Newby (1866-); Sleagill (1866-); Thrimby (1866-2019)	Morland St Laurence (ancient-); Bolton All Saints (medieval-); Great Strickland St Barnabas (1872-); Little Strickland St Mary (1814-); Thrimby Chapel (C16th-1814)
Shap	Mardale; Shap; Swindale	Shap (1866-1904); Shap Rural (1904-); Shap Urban [later Shap] (1904-)	Shap St Michael (ancient-); Mardale Holy Trinity (C16th-1937); Swindale Chapel (C17th-1937)
Warcop	Bleatarn; Burton; Sandford; Warcop	Warcop (1866-)	Warcop St Columba (medieval-); Bleatarn Chapel (1865-)
Ancient parish	Medieval townships	Civil parishes covering this area from 1866 on	Churches and ecclesiastical parishes

==== Medieval parishes and chapelries ====
The following lists parishes by ward and includes chapelries in italics.

Ward	Parishes
East	Appleby St Lawrence • Appleby St Michael • Asby (Little Asby) • Crosby Garrett • Dufton • Great Musgrave • Kirkby Stephen (Brough • Mallerstang) • Kirkby Thore (Milburn • Temple Sowerby) • Long Marton • Newbiggin • Ormside • Orton • Ravenstonedale
Kendal	Beetham • Heversham (Crosscrake • Crosthwaite) • Kendal (Ambleside • Applethwaite • Bowness • Burneside • Crook • Grasmere • Grayrigg • Kendal All Hallows • Kentmere • Natland • Old Hutton • Over Staveley • Troutbeck • Winster) • Preston Patrick^{1}
Lonsdale	Burton • Kirkby Lonsdale (Barbon • Casterton • Hutton Roof • Killington)
West	Askham • Bampton • Barton (Martindale • Patterdale) • Brougham (Brougham St Wilfrid) • Cliburn • Clifton • Crosby Ravensworth • Lowther • Morland (Bolton) • Shap • Warcop
Lonsdale (Lancs)	Aldingham • Cartmel • Dalton-in-Furness (Hawkshead • Ireleth) • Kirkby Ireleth (Broughton-in-Furness • Woodland) • Pennington • Ulverston (Lowick) • Urswick

^{1}chapelry to Burton in Lonsdale ward

=== Lancashire (Lonsdale hundred) ===
Ancient parish	Medieval townships	Civil parishes covering this area from 1866 on	Churches and ecclesiastical parishes
Aldingham	Aldingham; Gleaston; Leece with Dendron	Aldingham (1866-)	Aldingham St Cuthbert (ancient-); Dendron St Matthew (1644-)
Cartmel	Broughton East; Cartmel Fell; Lower Allithwaite; Lower Holker; Staveley; Upper Allithwaite; Upper Holker	Broughton East (1866-); Cartmel Fell (1866-); Grange-over-Sands (1894-); (part of) Haverthwaite (1927-); Lower Allithwaite (1866-); Lower Holker (1866-); Staveley-in-Cartmel (1866-); Upper Allithwaite [renamed Lindale & Newton-in-Cartmel 2018] (1866-); Upper Holker (1866-1949)	Cartmel SS Mary & Michael (ancient-); Allithwaite St Mary (1865-); Broughton St Peter (1731-); Cartmel Fell St Anthony (c. 1504-); Flookburgh St John the Baptist (C16th-); Grange-over-Sands St Paul (1852-); Grange Fell Church (1898-); Lindale St Paul (1627-2019); Staveley St Mary (C17th-)
Dalton in Furness	Claife; Colton (own parish by C17th); Dalton Proper; Hawcoat; Hawkshead & Monk Coniston with Skelwith (as Colton); Ireleth; Lindal & Marton; Satterthwaite; Yarlside	Askam & Ireleth (1987-); Barrow-in-Furness (1867-); Claife (1866-); Colton (1866-); Coniston (1894-) (Monk Coniston area); Dalton-in-Furness (1866-1987); Dalton Town with Newton (1987-); (part of) Haverthwaite (1927-); Hawkshead (1894-); Hawkshead & Monk Coniston with Skelwith (1866-1894); Lindal & Marton (1987-); Satterthwaite (1866-); Skelwith (1894-)	Dalton-in-Furness St Mary (ancient-); Barrow St George (1861-); Barrow St James (1869-); Barrow St Paul (1871-); Barrow St Matthew (1878-2015); Barrow St Mark (1878-); Barrow St Luke (1878-2012); Barrow St John the Evangelist (1878-); Barrow St Perran (1894-2014); Barrow St Francis (1937-); Barrow St Aidan (1952-); Brathay Holy Trinity (1836-); Colton Holy Trinity (C16th-); Dalton-in-Furness St Margaret (1904-1981); Far Sawrey St Peter (1866-); Finsthwaite St Peter (1724-); Haverthwaite St Anne (1824-); Hawkshead St Michael (medieval-); Ireleth St Helen (medieval); Ireleth St Peter (1637-); Lindal St Peter (1875-); Low Wray St Margaret (1845-2007); Newton St Barnabas (1900-1977); Rampside St Michael (1621-2016); Rusland St Paul (1745-); Satterthwaite All Saints (C16th-); Walney St Mary (1568-)
Kirkby Ireleth	Broughton West; Dunnerdale with Seathwaite; Heathwaite; Low Quarter; Middle Quarter; Woodland	Broughton-in-Furness [later Broughton West] (1866-); Dunnerdale-with-Seathwaite (1866-); Kirkby Ireleth (1866-)	Kirkby Ireleth St Cuthbert (ancient-); Broughton-in-Furness St Mary Magdalene (medieval-); Broughton Mills Holy Innocents (1887-); Grizebeck Good Shepherd (1898-2012); Seathwaite Holy Trinity (C16th-); Woodland St John the Evangelist (medieval-)
Pennington	Pennington	Pennington (1866-)	Pennington St Michael (medieval-); Swarthmoor St Leonard (1883-C20th)
Ulverston	Blawith; Church Coniston; Egton with Newland; Lowick; Mansriggs; Osmotherley; Subberthwaite; Torver; Ulverston	Blawith (1866-1986); Blawith & Subberthwaite (1986-); Church Coniston (1866-1894); Coniston (1894-); Egton with Newland (1866-); Lowick (1866-); Mansriggs (1866-); Osmotherley (1866-); Subberthwaite (1866-1986); Torver (1866-); Ulverston (1866-)	Ulverston St Mary (ancient-); Blawith St John the Baptist (1577-1988); Coniston St Andrew (1578-); Lowick St Luke (medieval-); Osmotherley St John the Evangelist (1874-); Penny Bridge St Mary (C18th-); Sandside St Jude (1874-2006); Torver St Luke (C16th-); Ulverston Holy Trinity (1832-1975)
Urswick	Bardsea; Great Urswick; Little Urswick	Urswick (1866-)	Urswick SS Mary & Michael (ancient-); Bardsea Holy Trinity (1843-)
Angerton (extra-parochial)		Angerton (1866-)	
Ancient medieval parish	Townships	Civil parishes, 1866	Churches and ecclesiastical parishes

=== West Riding of Yorkshire (Ewecross wapentake) ===
Ancient parish	Medieval townships	Civil parishes covering this area from 1866 on	Churches and ecclesiastical parishes
Sedbergh	Dent; Garsdale; Sedbergh	Dent (1866-); Garsdale (1866-); Sedbergh (1866-)	Sedbergh St Andrew (medieval-); Cautley St Mark (1847-); Cowgill St John the Evangelist (1837-); Dent St Andrew (medieval-); Garsdale St John the Baptist (C16th-); Howgill Holy Trinity (C17th-); Vale of Lune St Gregory (1860s-1984)

=== Map of ancient parishes ===
Ancient parishes of Cumbria

== Growth and decline of church numbers over time ==
	Added	Closed	Total at end of period
Medieval parish churches	Addingham Old, Aikton, Appleby St Lawrence, Appleby St Michael, Arlecdon, Arthuret, Asby, Askham, Bampton, Beaumont, Beckermet St Bridget, Beckermet St John, Bewcastle, Bootle, Bowness-on-Solway, Brampton Old, Brough, Brougham St Ninian, Burgh-by-Sands, Caldbeck, Carlisle Cathedral, Carlisle St Cuthbert, Castle Carrock, Castle Sowerby, Cleator, Cliburn, Clifton, Corney, Crosby Garrett, Crosby-on-Eden, Crosby Ravensworth, Cumrew, Cumwhitton, Dalston, Drigg, Dufton, Easton, Egremont, Farlam, Gosforth, Great Musgrave, Grinsdale, Haile, Hayton, Irton, Irthington, Kirkandrews-on-Eden, Kirkandrews-on-Esk, Kirkbampton, Kirkby Stephen, Kirkby Thore, Kirkcambeck, Kirklinton, Lamplugh, Lanercost, Long Marton, Lowther, Moresby, Morland, Muncaster, Nether Denton, Newbiggin, Ormside, Orton (Cumberland), Orton (Westmorland), Ponsonby, Ravenstonedale, Rockcliffe, St Bees, Scaleby, Sebergham, Shap, Stanwix, Stapleton, Upper Denton, Waberthwaite, Walton, Warcop, Warwick, Wetheral, Whicham, Whitbeck	Addingham Old, Easton	
Medieval chapels	Bleatarn, Bolton, Brougham St Wilfrid, Carlisle Holy Trinity, Carlisle St Alban, Ennerdale, Eskdale St Catherine, Highhead, Linstock, Little Asby, Mallerstang, Milburn, Nether Wasdale, Raughton Head, Temple Sowerby, Westward Old, Whitehaven St Nicholas, Wreay	Carlisle Holy Trinity, Cockermouth St Helen, Cockermouth St Leonard, Ireleth St Helen, Linstock, Little Asby, Westward Old	
16th century	Addingham St Michael, Mardale, Thrimby, Walney, Wasdale Head, Westward New	Brackenthwaite, Carlisle St Alban	
17th century	Nicholforest, Soulby, Stainmore St Stephen, Swindale	Casterton St Columba, Great Broughton, Kirkandrews-on-Eden	
18th century	Brampton New, Hensingham, Whitehaven Holy Trinity, Whitehaven St James	Applethwaite, Staveley St Margaret	
1800-1830	Carlisle Christ Church, Little Strickland	Thrimby	
1830s	Carlisle Holy Trinity, Houghton		
1840s	Calder Bridge, Holme Eden, Rosley, Talkin, Upperby, Whitehaven Christ Church		
1850s	Colby, Gilsland, Murton-with-Hilton, Scotby	Wythop Old	
1860s	Barrow St George, Barrow St James, Carlisle St James, Carlisle St John, Carlisle St Paul, Carlisle St Stephen, Cotehill, Frizington, Gaitsgill, Ivegill, Stainmore St Mary		
1870s	Barrow St John, Barrow St Luke, Barrow St Mark, Barrow St Matthew, Barrow St Paul, Blackford, Carlisle St Mary's Church, Cleator Moor, Cumdivock, Eamont Bridge, Great Strickland, Hethersgill, Keekle, Welton		
1880s	Bigrigg, Kirkland, Seascale, Tebay		
1890s	Barrow St Perran, Carlisle St Aidan, Carlisle St Andrew, Carlisle St Barnabas, Eskdale St Bega, Newbiggin-on-Lune, Wath Brow		
1900s	Knock, Moresby Parks		
1910s			
1920s	Cummersdale		
1930s	Barrow St Francis, Carlisle St Herbert, Kells, Kingmoor, Thornhill	Carlisle Christ Church, Eamont Bridge, Swindale, Mardale	
1940s		Whitehaven Holy Trinity	
1950s	Barrow St Aidan, Belah St Mark, Carlisle St Luke, Harraby, Mirehouse	Carlisle St Mary's Church, Colby, Kirkcambeck, Kirksanton, Swarthmoor	
1960s		Carlisle St Stephen, Uldale St John	
1970s		Appleby St Michael, Brougham St Ninian, Brampton Old, Carlisle St Paul, Gaitsgill, Highhead, Hunsonby, Ireby Old, Knock, Little Salkeld, Newton, Stainmore St Mary, Ulverston Holy Trinity, Upper Denton, Whitehaven Christ Church	
1980s		Ambleside St Anne, Blawith, Dalton St Margaret, Newbiggin-on-Lune, Vale of Lune	
1990s		Windermere St John	
2000s		Gamblesby, Grinsdale, Kendal All Hallows, Low Wray, Moresby Parks, Papcastle, Sandsfield, Sandside, Soulby	
2010s		Barrow St Luke, Barrow St Matthew, Barrow St Perran, Broughton Moor, Causewayhead, Grizebeck, Keekle, Lindale, Maryport Christ Church, Rampside, Warwick, Wath Brow, West Seaton	
2020s		Brougham St Wilfrid, Carlisle Holy Trinity, Cummersdale, Lowther, Waverton	

== See also ==
- List of civil parishes in England
- Map of churches and chapels in 1829
