= Stainburn =

Stainburn may refer to:

- Stainburn, Cumbria, United Kingdom
- Stainburn, North Yorkshire, United Kingdom
