= St Mary & St Michael, Egremont =

Coordinates: 54.4807°N 3.5276°W

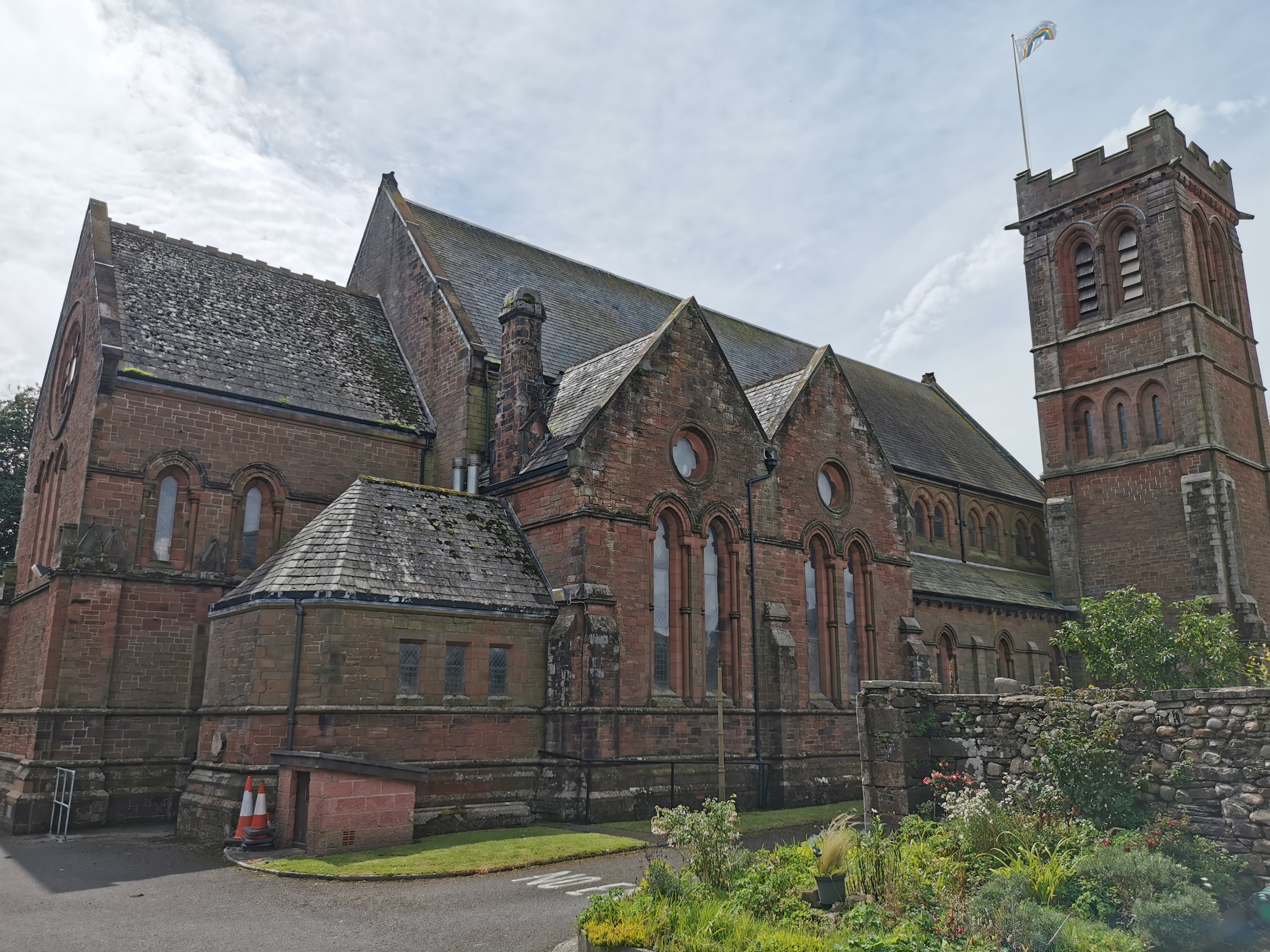
- St Mary & St Michael, Egremont

- Location in Cumbria
- OS grid reference: NY 0111810565
- Location: Egremont, Cumbria
- Country: England
- Denomination: Anglican

History
- Status: Parish church
- Dedication: St Mary & St Michael

Administration
- Province: York
- Diocese: Carlisle
- Archdeaconry: West Cumberland
- Deanery: Calder
- Parish: Egremont

Clergy
- Vicar: Rev'd Melanie Appleby

St Mary & St Michael is in Egremont, Cumbria, England. It is an active Anglican parish church in the deanery of Calder, and the diocese of Carlisle. Its benefice of Egremont with Bigrigg & Haile. The church is a Grade II listed building.

== History ==
St Mary & St Michael's Church was built in 1881, to a design by T.L Banks of Whitehaven, replacing an earlier 12th century church. A recess in the west wall houses the baptistry, donated by the Freemasons of Egremont in 1883, contains seven stained-glass windows. In 1901 the tower was raised 42 feet by Oliver & Dodgshun (Carlisle) and contains a set of eight bells presented by Lord Leconfield.

== Architecture ==
The church has hammer-dressed, snecked, sandstone blocks with quoins; moulded plinth, strings, eaves cornice, and pilaster buttresses. It has a graduated slate roof with outshoots to either side of the chancel with stone copings, kneelers, and apex crosses. There is an embattled tower to north-west corner, nave with aisles, short transept, and chancel. The 4-stage tower has a panelled door to ground floor with a pointed arch-head of 4 orders with foliate capitals to jamb-shafts. There is a similar 2-order door in the gabled porch on south side. The lancet windows, some in chancel and north nave aisle re-used are late 12th century; the corbels are of similar date to north aisle. The interior has pointed arches throughout with a 5-bay nave arcade carried on columns with foliate capitals. The nave roof is carried on corbels. The transept arms are separated from nave by a 2-bay arcade carried on tall quatrefoil pier. There are 2-seater sedilia, pillar piscina, and shelf, under wall arcade in chancel. The pulpit is Caen stone with alabaster figures, supported on marble shafts. The font has a sculpture of a kneeling angel holding a large scallop shell, copied from a design by Thorvaldsen in the Lutheran Cathedral in Copenhagen. Above the altar is a carved reredos, and above that a large stained glass window. The glass in the rose window was replaced with a modern design by Christine Boyce in 1992.

== Churchyard ==
The churchyard extension has 2 Commonwealth War Graves from the First and Second World War
