= Kingwater =

Civil parish in Cumbria, England

Coordinates: 55.04°N 2.65°W

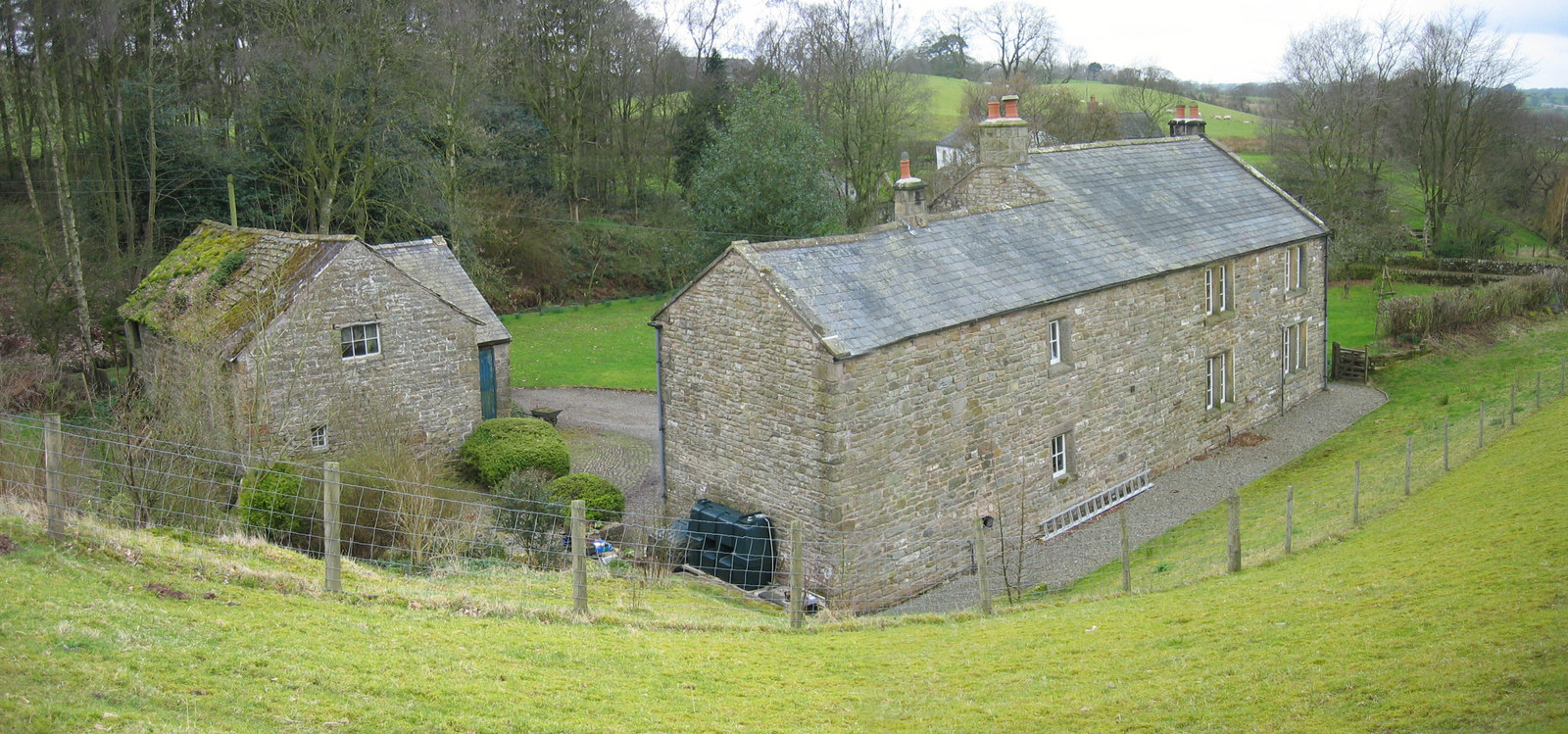
Clockey Mill, a grade II listed 18th-century former Corn Mill in the parish

Kingwater is a civil parish in Cumberland district, Cumbria, England. At the 2011 census it had a population of 170.

The parish is bordered to the north west by Askerton, to the north by Tarset, to the north east by Henshaw, to the south east by Thirlwall (these three being in Northumberland), to the south by Waterhead and Burtholme and to the south west by Walton.

There is a parish council, the lowest tier of local government.

The parish is described by its parish council as having "several farms, dwellings and small hamlets" but "no school, no pub, no church or village hall".

In 1874 Kingwater was one of four townships within the parish of Lanercost.

== Listed buildings ==
As of 2017 there are 6 listed buildings in the parish, all at grade II.
