= St Paul's, Frizington =

Coordinates: 54.5387°N 3.4965°W

St Paul, Frizington
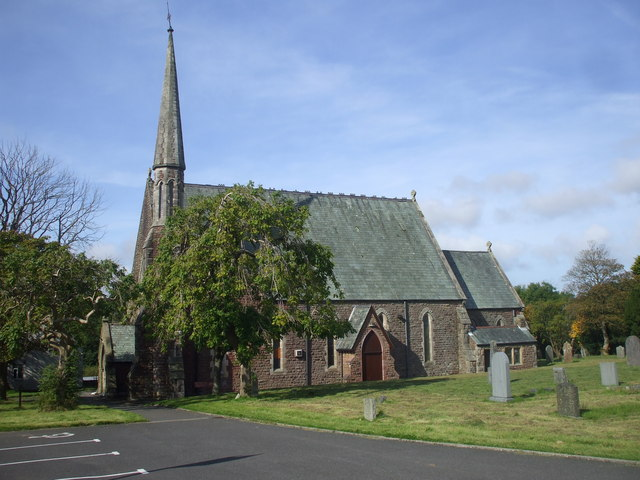
- St Paul, Frizington

- Location in Cumbria
- OS grid reference: NY 0327416975
- Location: Frizington, Cumbria
- Country: England
- Denomination: Anglican
- Website: https://crosslacon.net/our-churches/st-pauls-frizington/

History
- Status: Parish church
- Dedication: St Paul

Administration
- Province: York
- Diocese: Carlisle
- Archdeaconry: West Cumberland
- Deanery: Calder
- Parish: Frizington

Clergy
- Vicar: Rev Nicki Pennington

St Paul's is in Frizington, Cumbria, England. It is an active Anglican parish church in the deanery of Calder, and the diocese of Carlisle. Its benefice is Crosslacon. The church is not a Listed Building.

== History ==
St Paul's church was Built in 1867 and consecrated in 1868. It is in the early English style of architecture built of local red sandstone. The Church was altered in 2000 and now comprises The Lingla Centre Cafe.

== Architecture ==
Built of the local red sandstone with a slate roof and an octagonal belfry. The interior space comprises a large nave, chancel and south aisle. In 2000 the internal space was sub-divided with a breeze block wall. The east side still contains the space for worship with the original altar but the pews have gone. The north window is stained glass. There is an octagonal marble font. The pipe organ has 27 pipes. On the west side there are now modern facilities that include a lift to the inserted first floor, professional kitchen, meeting room, WCs and a café. There are some similarities with the alterations at St Mary, Ennerdale.

== Churchyard ==
The church has a large churchyard, that land was purchased and extended in 1928 - 1929. There are 7 casualties buried here from the First & Second World War.
