= St Bega, Eskdale =

Coordinates: 54.3897°N 3.3235°W

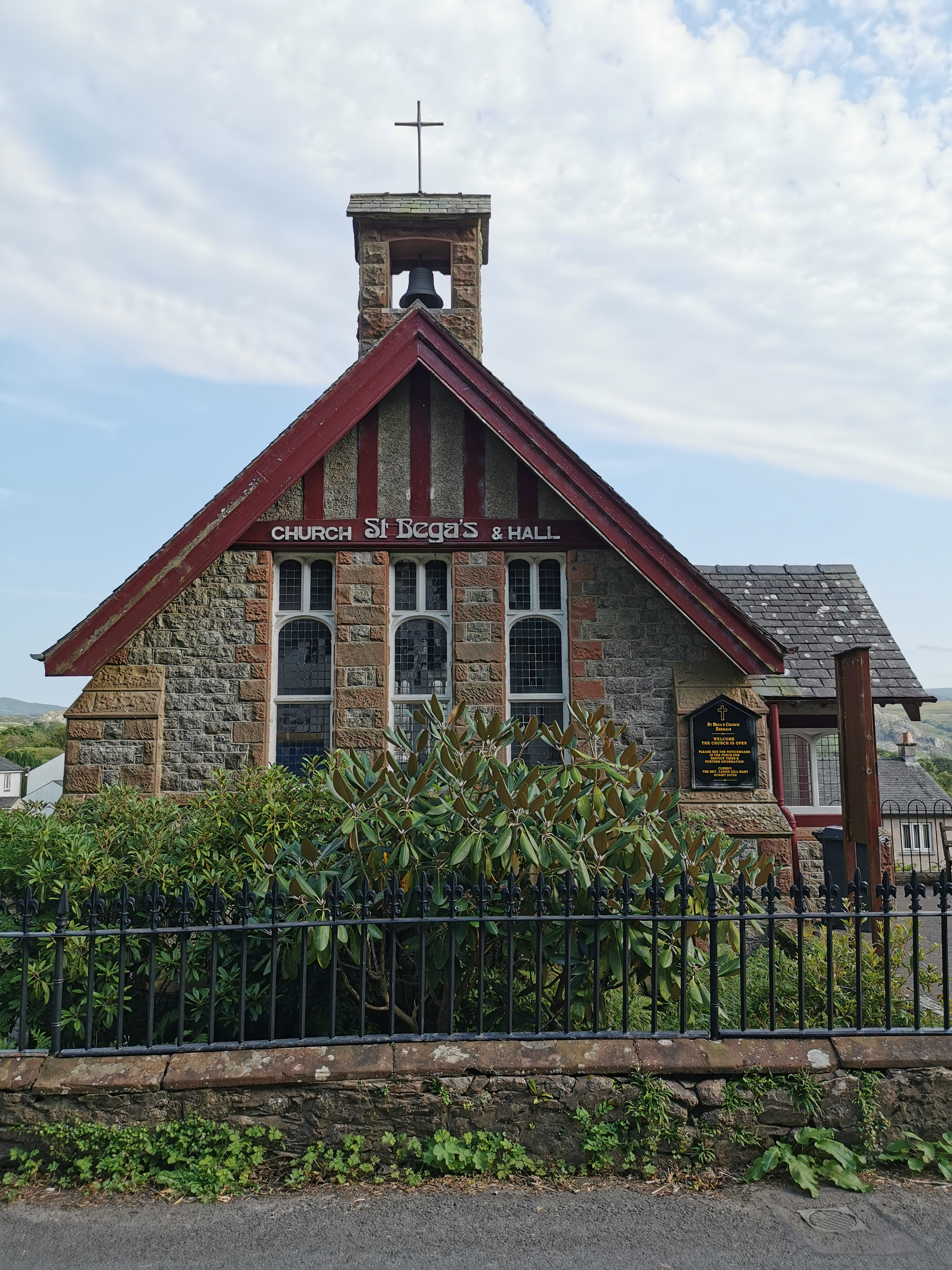
- St Bega, Eskdale

- Location in Cumbria
- OS grid reference: NY1415400166
- Location: St Bega, Eskdale, Cumbria
- Country: England
- Denomination: Anglican

History
- Status: Parish church
- Dedication: St Bega

Administration
- Province: York
- Diocese: Carlisle
- Archdeaconry: West Cumberland
- Deanery: Calder
- Parish: Eskdale

Clergy
- Vicar: Revd Gill Hart

St Bega is in Eskdale, Cumbria, England. It is an active Anglican parish church in the deanery of Calder, and the diocese of Carlisle. Its benefice is Black Combe, Drigg, Eskdale, Irton, Muncaster and Waberthwaite. The church is not a listed building.

== History ==
St Bega's Church was built as a Chapel of Ease by Lord Rea in 1890. The Church school was originally underneath the church. In 1967, the school moved to a modern building on Longrigg Lane. The ground floor is now used as a village hall and above remains the church.

== Architecture ==
The church was built from the local red and grey sandstone, topped with a slate roof. The church has a bellcote with one bell. The interior space comprises a Nave. The windows are all opaque and pews are moveable. The terracotta, triquetra font, from an earlier church, has triquetras and floral carvings. The church has no churchyard.
