= St John the Baptist, Corney =

Coordinates: 54.3096°N 3.3656°W

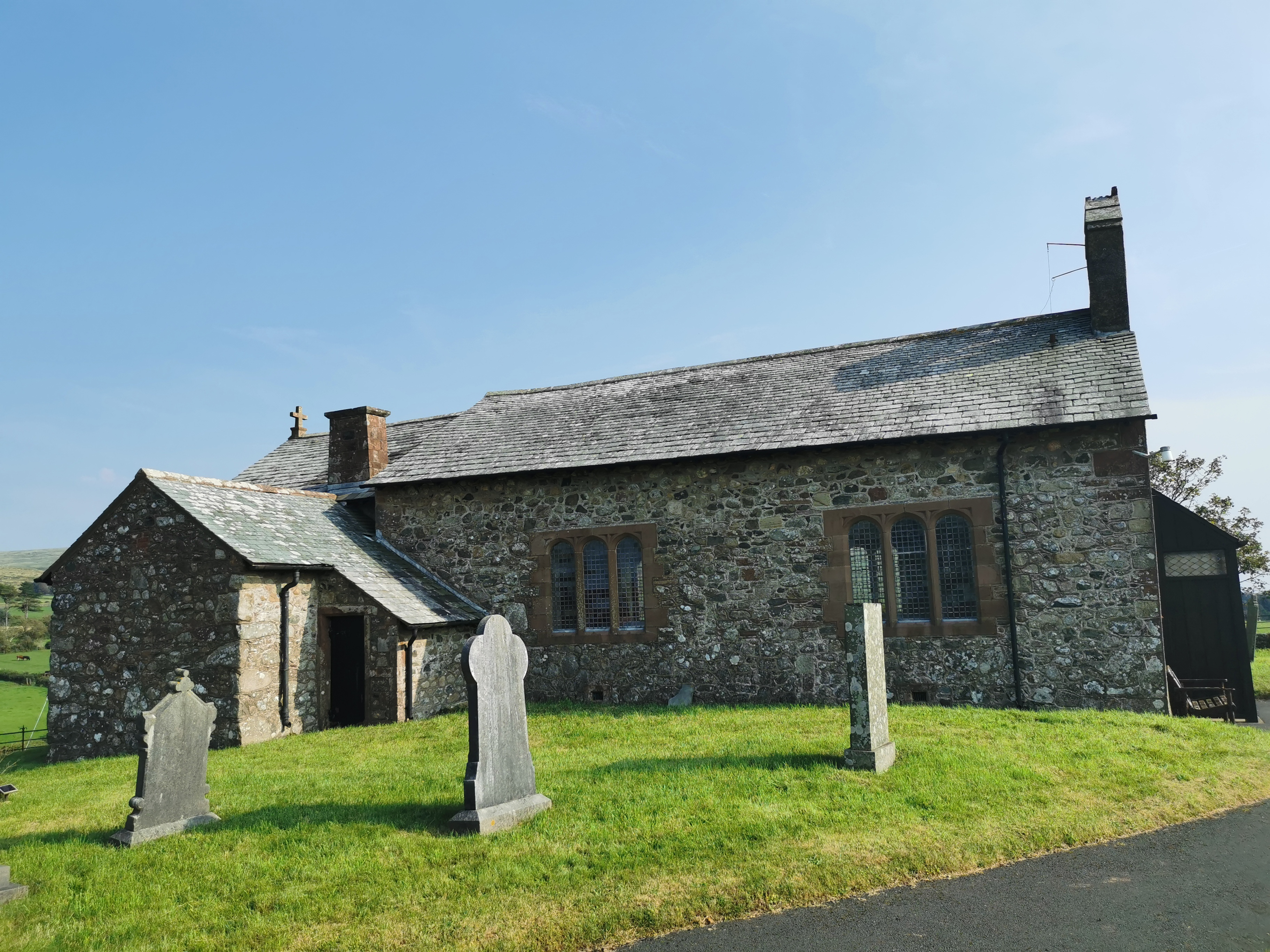
- St John the Baptist, Corney

- Location in Cumbria
- OS grid reference: SD1124391315
- Location: St John the Baptist, Corney, Cumbria
- Country: England
- Denomination: Anglican
- Website: http://www.blackcombechurches.co.uk/Corney.php

History
- Status: Parish church
- Dedication: St John the Baptist

Administration
- Province: York
- Diocese: Carlisle
- Archdeaconry: West Cumberland
- Deanery: Calder
- Parish: The Black Combe Churches

Clergy
- Vicar: Revd Gill Hart

St John the Baptist, is in Corney, Cumbria, England. It is an Anglican parish church in the deanery of Calder, and the diocese of Carlisle. Its benefice is Black Combe, Drigg, Eskdale, Irton, Muncaster and Waberthwaite. The church is not a listed building.

== History ==
Corney St John is thought to have been built in the 12th Century, and was restored in 1882. It formerly belonged to the Abbey of St. Mary, York, which presented to the living in 1536, but is now a rectory in the patronage of the earl of Lonsdale, the advowson being purchased of John, first baron Muncaster, in 1803. According to Mannix and Whelan (1847) the church was "a plain edifice with a belfry containing two bells" and the vestry was added in 1847.

== Architecture ==
Built of the local red and grey sandstone with a slate roof. Church has a bellcote with two bells. The interior space comprises a Nave. The windows are all opaque and pews are fixed. The round grey font, has of the farther and of the son and of the holy spirit carved around.

The churchyard has approximately 100 grave stones including 1 Commonwealth War Grave

The churchyard also has a sundial dated 1822 a gift of Edward Troughton.
