= Border Rural District =

Former local government area in the UK

Coordinates: 54.895°N 2.934°W

Border was a rural district of Cumberland, England from 1934 to 1974.

It was formed by a County Review Order in 1934, by a merger of Longtown Rural District, most of Brampton Rural District and nearly all of Carlisle Rural District, as well as a part of Penrith Rural District. It entirely surrounded the County Borough of Carlisle.

In 1974 it was abolished under the Local Government Act 1972, going on to form an enlarged City of Carlisle district with Carlisle.
