= St Peter, Drigg =

Coordinates: 54.2247°N 3.2557°W

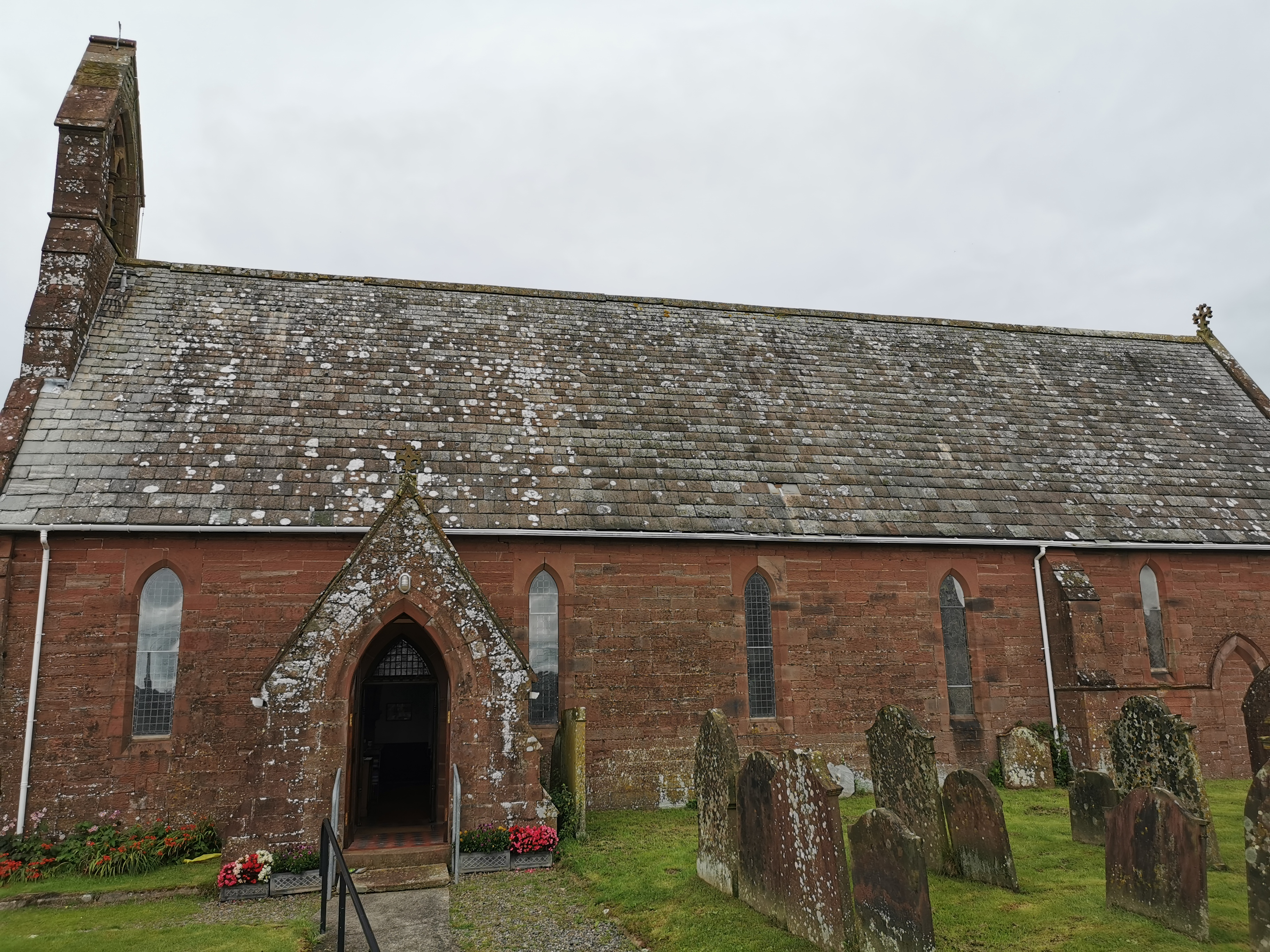
- St Peter, Drigg

- Location in Cumbria
- OS grid reference: SD0704099205
- Location: St Peter, Drigg, Cumbria
- Country: England
- Denomination: Anglican

History
- Status: Parish church
- Dedication: St Peter

Administration
- Province: York
- Diocese: Carlisle
- Archdeaconry: West Cumberland
- Deanery: Calder
- Parish: Drigg

Clergy
- Vicar: Revd Gill Hart

St Peter, Drigg is in Drigg, Cumbria, England. It is an active Anglican parish church in the deanery of Calder, and the diocese of Carlisle. Its benefice is Black Combe, Drigg, Eskdale, Irton, Muncaster and Waberthwaite. The church is not a listed building.

== History ==
St Peter's church was founded by Augustinian monks in the 13th century. It was rebuilt and consecrated in 1850 using the old church's original stone and wood.

== Architecture ==
Built of the local red sandstone with a slate roof and bellcote with two bells. The interior space comprises a large Nave with a North Aisle and Chancel. The arcade of pillars and octagonal font remain from 1292. The nave has a tall single lancet in the west wall with a plaque below.

The stained glass windows are by various artists including the East window being by William Wailes. The 31 pipe organ has a plaque with the inscription "To the glory of god and to commemorate the 60th year of the reign of her most gracious majesty Queen Victoria." 1897. The pews are a dark wood and fixed.

The churchyard has approximately 200 grave stones including 1 Commonwealth War Grave
