= North Lonsdale Rural District =

Former local government area in the UK

Coordinates: 54.291°N 3.062°W

North Lonsdale was a rural district in the county of Lancashire, England from 1894 to 1974. It was created in 1894 as the Ulverston Rural District, and was renamed in 1960.

It covered all of North Lonsdale (the exclave of Lancashire north of Morecambe Bay), apart from the towns of Barrow-in-Furness, Dalton-in-Furness, Grange and Ulverston.

It was abolished in 1974 under the Local Government Act 1972. It was combined with Grange and Ulverston, along with districts from other counties, to form the district of South Lakeland in Cumbria.
