= Wigton Rural District =

Historical rural district

Coordinates: 54.825°N 3.161°W

Wigton was a rural district in Cumberland, England from 1894 to 1974.

It was created by the Local Government Act 1894 based on Wigton rural sanitary district. Wigton was originally an urban district but became a civil parish in the Wigton RD in 1934.

It was abolished by the Local Government Act 1972 on 1 April 1974 and has since formed part of the Allerdale district of Cumbria.
