= Laversdale =

Village in Cumbria, England

Coordinates: 54.954°N 2.818°W

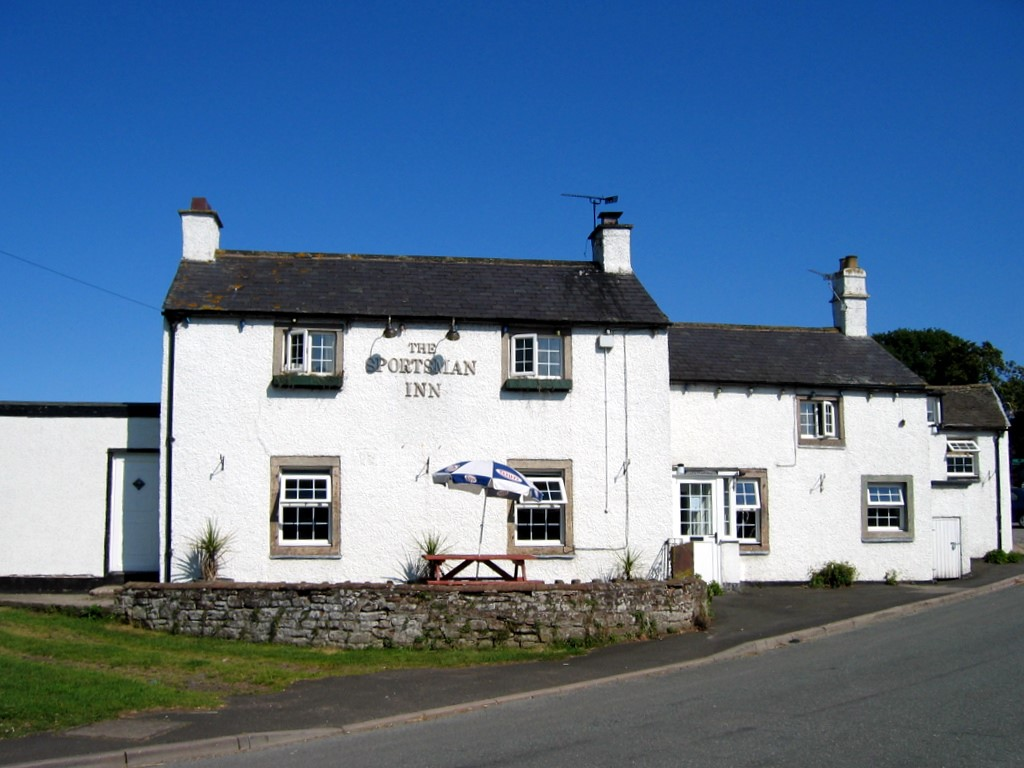
- The Sportsman Inn public house, Laversdale

- Location in the former Carlisle district, Cumbria Location within Cumbria
- OS grid reference: NY476624
- Civil parish: Irthington
- Unitary authority: Cumberland
- Ceremonial county: Cumbria
- Region: North West
- Country: England
- Sovereign state: United Kingdom
- Post town: CARLISLE
- Postcode district: CA6
- Dialling code: 01228
- Police: Cumbria
- Fire: Cumbria
- Ambulance: North West
- UK Parliament: Carlisle

Laversdale is a village in Cumbria, England, situated to the north of Carlisle Lake District Airport. In 1870-72 the township had a population of 428. One of its more distinctive buildings is a thatched tithe barn, now a private house. The manor of Laversdale traditionally lies within the parish and bailiwick of Irthington in the Barony of Gilsland, and covers 3200 acres. It was held by the Earl of Carlisle until the 1980s.

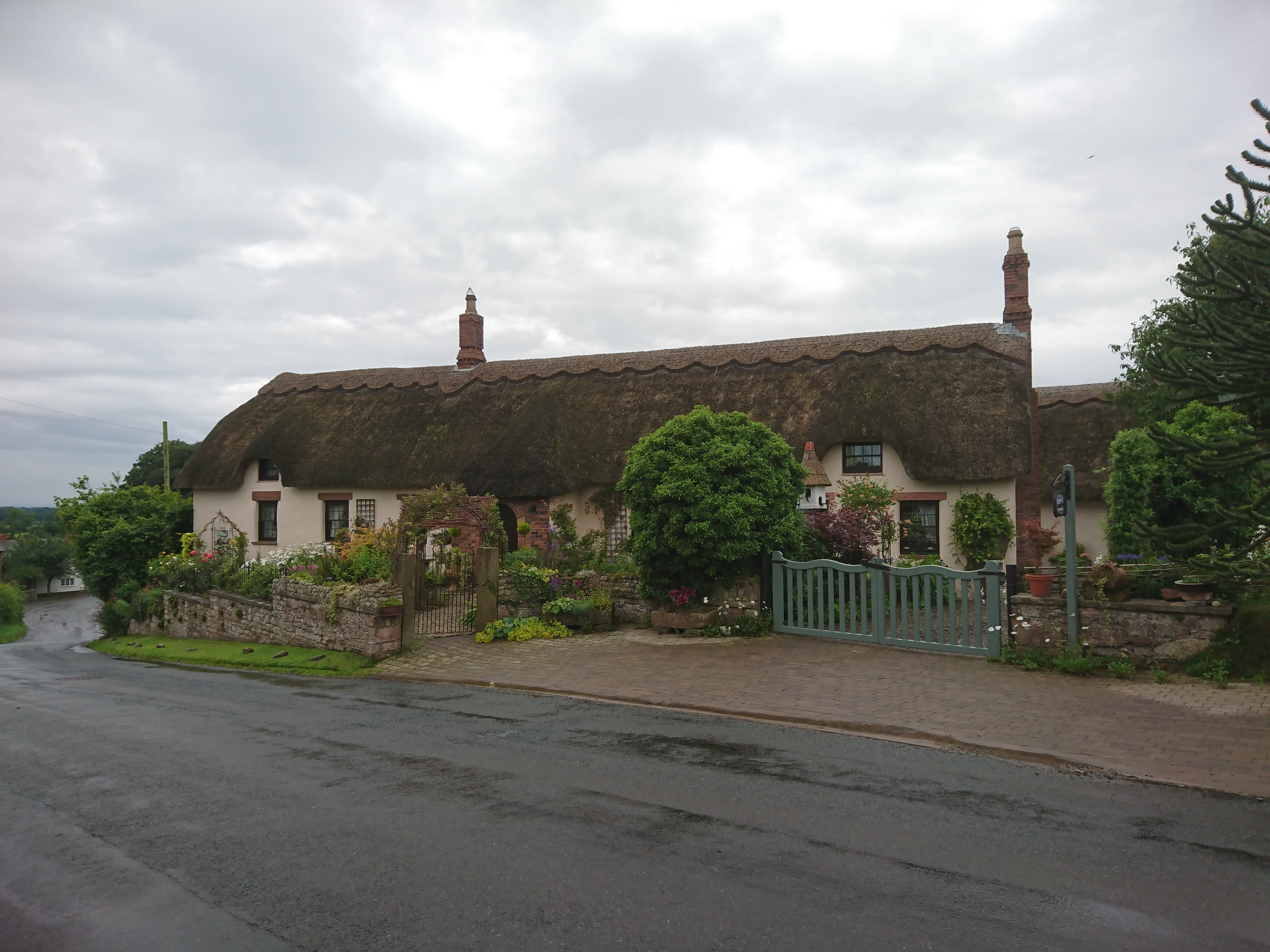
Laversdale Tithe Barn

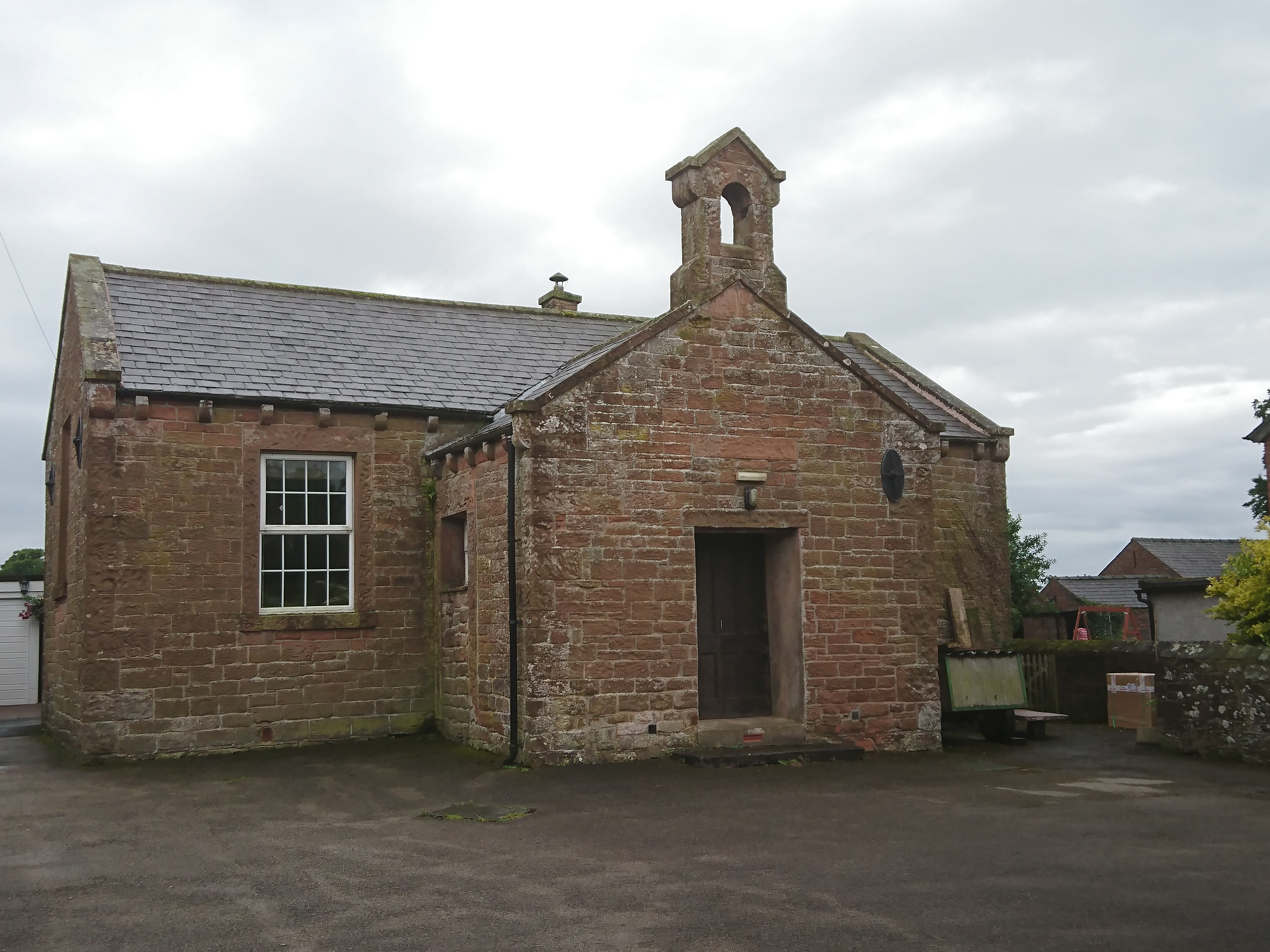
Laversdale Village Hall

A turf section of Hadrian's Wall passes through the old manor boundaries just to the south of the village. Milecastle 60 would have been placed here although its exact location is uncertain. In 1851 a Roman altar was ploughed up near the likely spot. Dedicated to Cocidius, it was erected by the Sixth Legion.

There are no shops or other amenities in Laversdale following the closure of the village pub (The Sportsman Inn). The parish church is St. Kentigern's, in Irthington.
