= Millom Rural District =

Former local government area in the UK

Coordinates: 54.209°N 3.270°W

Millom was a rural district in Cumberland in England from 1934 to 1974.

It was formed by a County Review Order in 1934 by the merger of the Millom urban district with most of the Bootle Rural District.

It continued in existence until 1 April 1974, when it was merged by the Local Government Act 1972 to form the Copeland district of Cumbria.
