= Solport =

Civil parish in Cumbria, England

Coordinates: 55.034°N 2.837°W

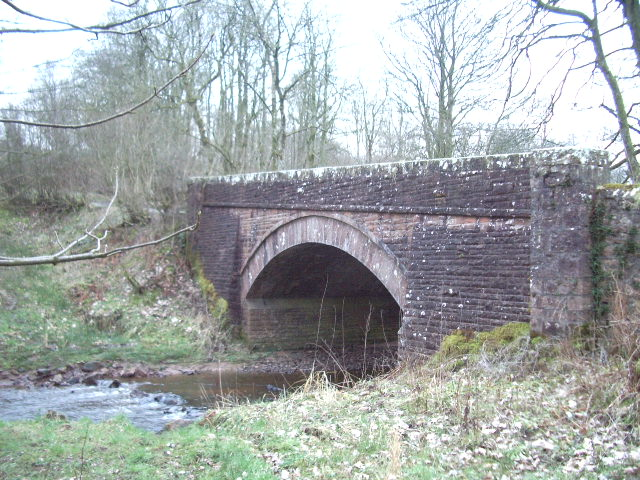
Solport Bridge over Rae Burn

Solport is a civil parish in Cumberland district, Cumbria, England. In the 2011 UK Census it had a population of 166.

It shares a parish council with the adjacent parish of Stapleton.

== Toponymy ==
The name Solport is Brittonic in origin and derived from *sulu, probably meaning "a view" or "prospect" (Welsh syllu, Breton selle), suffixed with -pert, "bush, thicket" (Welsh perth).

== Listed buildings ==
There are two listed buildings in the parish, both at grade II: a house with barn, and a former Quaker meeting house.
