= Sedbergh Rural District =

Former local government area in England

Coordinates: 54.312°N 2.880°W

Sedbergh Rural District was a rural district in the West Riding of Yorkshire in England from 1894 to its abolition in 1974. The district consisted of the three parishes of Sedbergh, Garsdale and Dent. In 1974 the district became part of the South Lakeland district in the new non-metropolitan county of Cumbria.
