= St John's, Castlerigg and Wythburn =

Civil parish in Cumbria, England

Coordinates: 54.513°N 3.0451°W

St John's Castlerigg and Wythburn
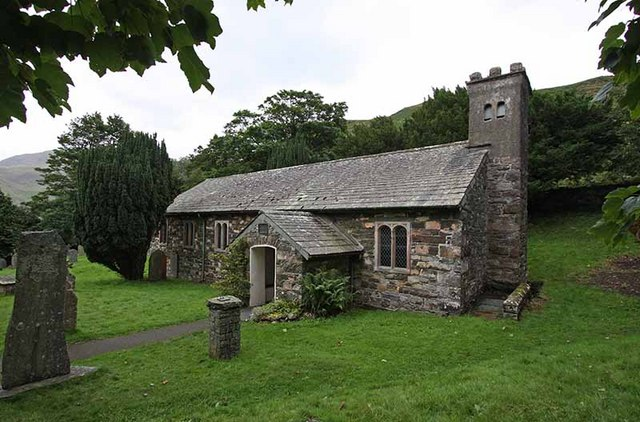
- St John's in the Vale church

- Location within Cumbria
- Population: 422 (2011 census)
- Civil parish: St John's Castlerigg and Wythburn
- Unitary authority: Cumberland
- Ceremonial county: Cumbria
- Region: North West
- Country: England
- Sovereign state: United Kingdom
- Police: Cumbria
- Fire: Cumbria
- Ambulance: North West

St John's, Castlerigg and Wythburn is a civil parish in Cumberland district, Cumbria, England. In the 2011 census it was recorded as having a population of 422. There is a parish council; its archives 1894–1995 are held at the Cumbria Archive Service in Carlisle. In 2004 a parish plan was drawn up and approved by the parish council.

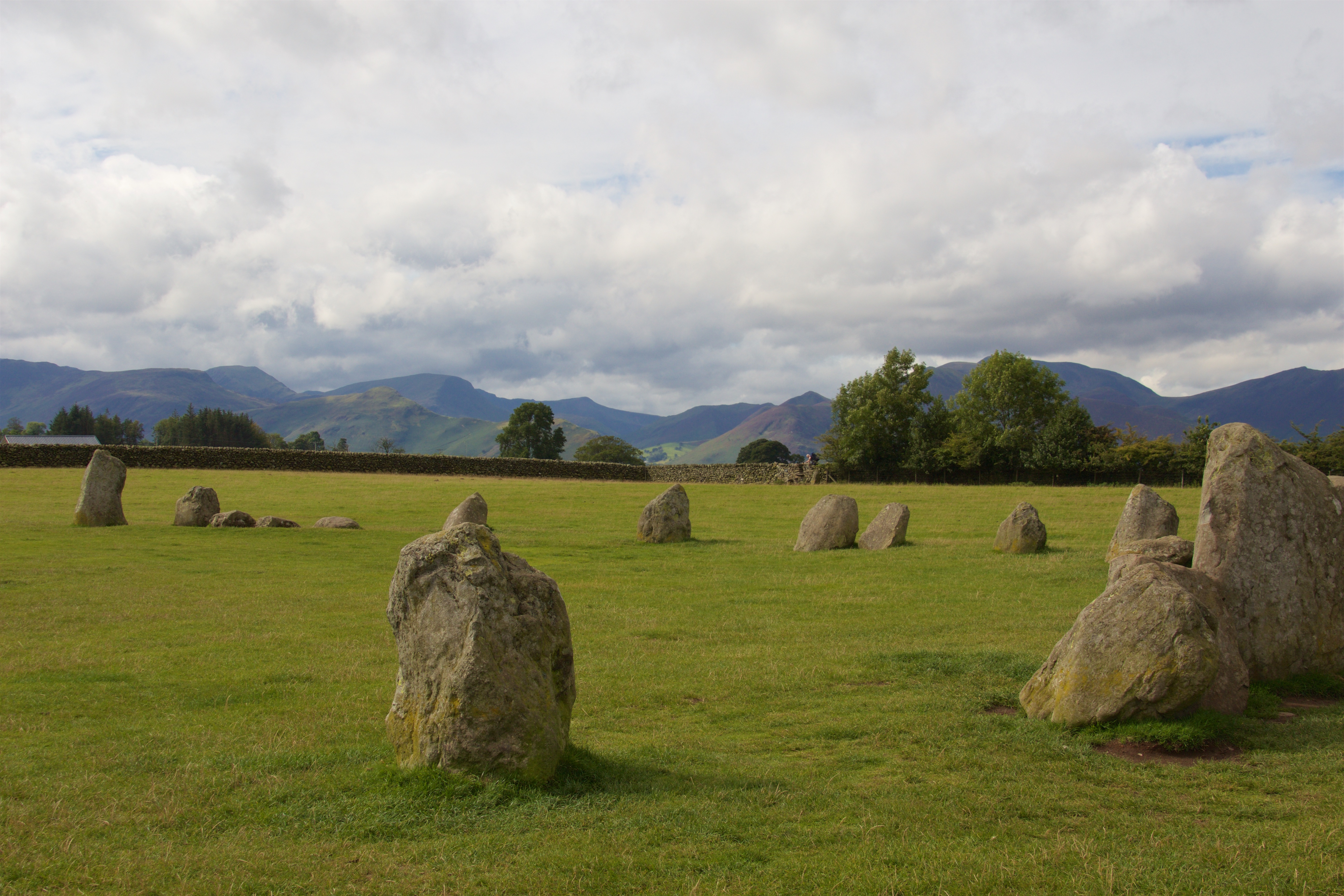
Castlerigg stone circle

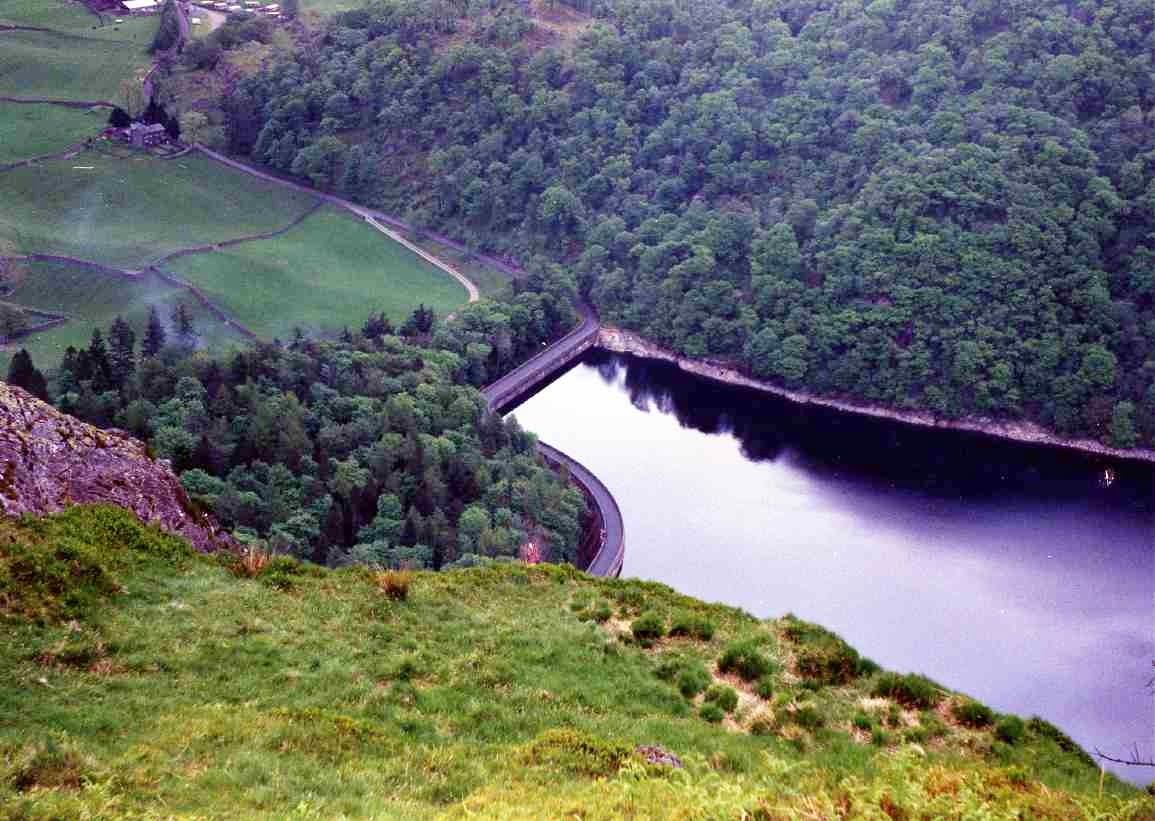
Thirlmere dam, which drowned the village of Wythburn

The parish covers an area on either side of the A591 road from Dunmail Raise in the south to the outskirts of Keswick in the north, and extends to include the valley of St John's in the Vale in the north east. The neighbouring parishes, listed anti-clockwise, are Lakes in Westmorland and Furness district to the south; Patterdale, Matterdale and Threlkeld also in Westmorland and Furness to the east, the border following the mountain ridge and crossing the summit of Helvellyn; Underskiddaw and Keswick to the north; and Borrowdale to the west.

There are 23 Grade II listed buildings or structures in the parish including Wythburn Church and St John's Church, St John's in the Vale, and 10 scheduled monuments including Castlerigg stone circle.

The village of Wythburn was drowned in the construction of Thirlmere reservoir, completed in 1894, although its church survives.

The parish has also been known as Castlerigg St John's and Wythburn, and with various variations in the presence or absence of comma, full stop after "St", and apostrophe.
