= South Westmorland Rural District =

Former local government area in the UK

Coordinates: 54.373°N 2.719°W

South Westmorland
- Rural district
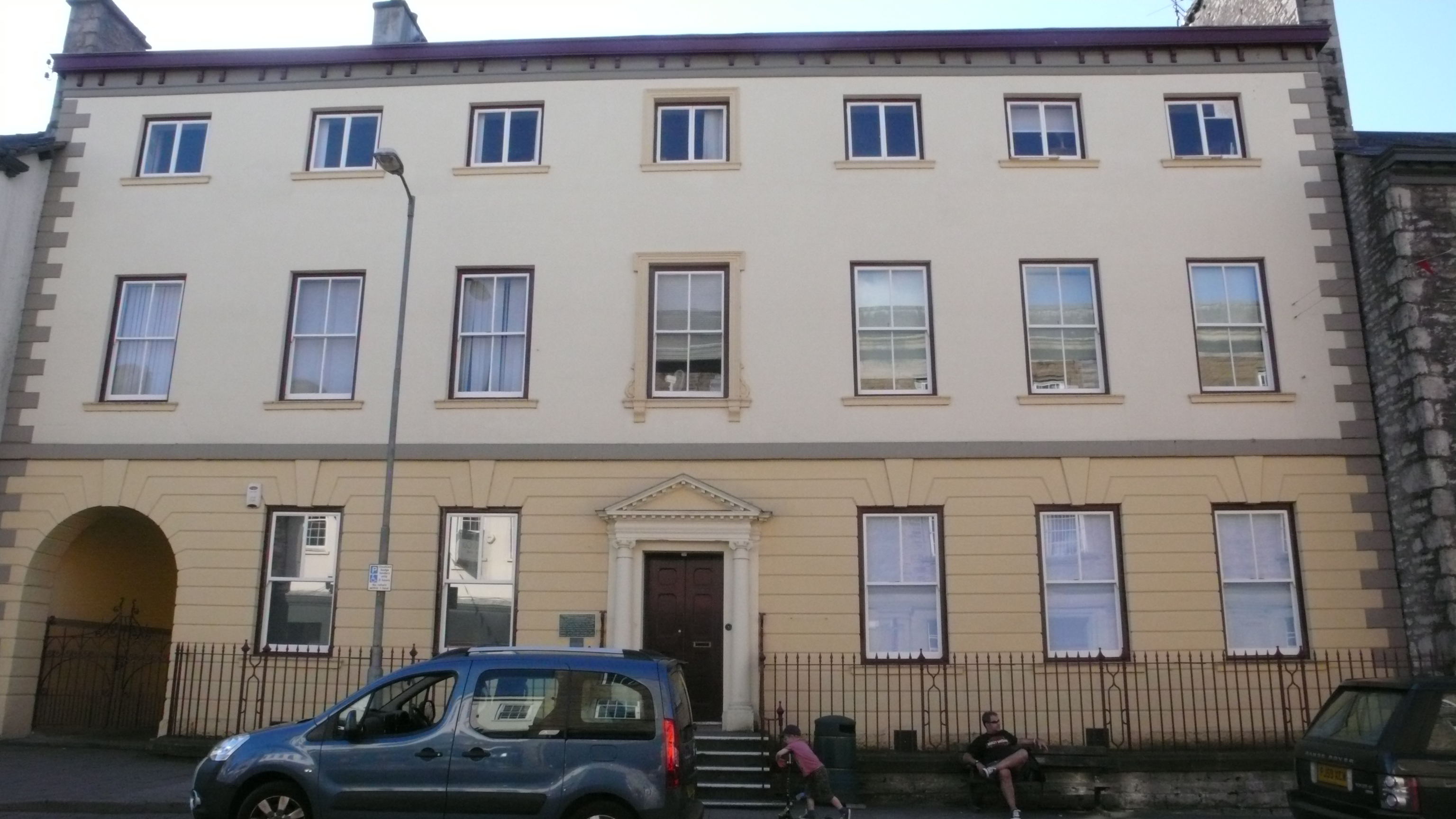
- Stricklandgate House, 92 Stricklandgate, Kendal: council's headquarters
- Area
  - 1911: 170,810 acres (691.2 km^{2})
  - 1961: 151,007 acres (611.1 km^{2})
- Population
  - 1901: 19,281
  - 1971: 19,135
- History
  - Created: 28 December 1894
  - Abolished: 31 March 1974
  - Succeeded by: South Lakeland
  - HQ: Kendal

South Westmorland was a rural district in Westmorland, England from 1894 to 1974. It saw various boundary changes during its existence, particularly in 1935, when it absorbed Kirkby Lonsdale urban district, whilst parts merged with Ambleside and Grasmere Urban Districts to form Lakes Urban District at the same time. The district was abolished in 1974 under the Local Government Act 1972, with the area becoming part of the South Lakeland district of Cumbria.

== History ==
The district had its origins in the Kendal Poor Law Union, which had been created in 1836, covering Kendal itself and a large rural area surrounding the town. In 1872 sanitary districts were established, giving public health and local government responsibilities for rural areas to the existing boards of guardians of poor law unions. The Kendal Rural Sanitary District therefore covered the area of the poor law union except for Bowness on Windermere, Grasmere, Kendal, Kirkby Lonsdale, and Windermere, which each had urban authorities and so became their own urban sanitary districts. Ambleside was subsequently made its own urban sanitary district in 1884, removing it from the Kendal Rural Sanitary District. The Kendal Rural Sanitary District was administered from the workhouse in Kendal, which had been built in 1769 at 1A Windermere Road.

Under the Local Government Act 1894, rural sanitary districts became rural districts from 28 December 1894. Had the Kendal Rural Sanitary District followed the usual naming pattern, it would have become "Kendal Rural District". However, at the new council's first meeting, on 29 December 1894 at the workhouse, the council chose instead to call the district "South Westmorland Rural District". John Holme of Milnthorpe was appointed the first chairman of the council, having been the chairman of the board of guardians for the previous fourteen years.

In 1935 the district boundaries were changed. It gained Kirkby Lonsdale, which ceased to be a separate urban district. At the same time it ceded the parishes of Langdales, Rydal and Loughrigg, and Troutbeck to the new Lakes Urban District, created from those parishes plus the Ambleside and Grasmere Urban Districts and the parish of Patterdale from West Ward Rural District.

== Premises ==
In its early years, the council met at Kendal Town Hall, with staff based at various offices around Kendal.

By 1951 the council was based at Stricklandgate House at 92 Stricklandgate in Kendal, where it would remain until its abolition in 1974.

== Abolition ==
South Westmorland Rural District was abolished under the Local Government Act 1972, with the area becoming part of the new district of South Lakeland on 1 April 1974. Stricklandgate House was subsequently used as the headquarters of South Lakeland District Council until 1991.
