= Stainburn, Cumbria =

Coordinates: 54.645619°N 3.5213006°W

Stainburn
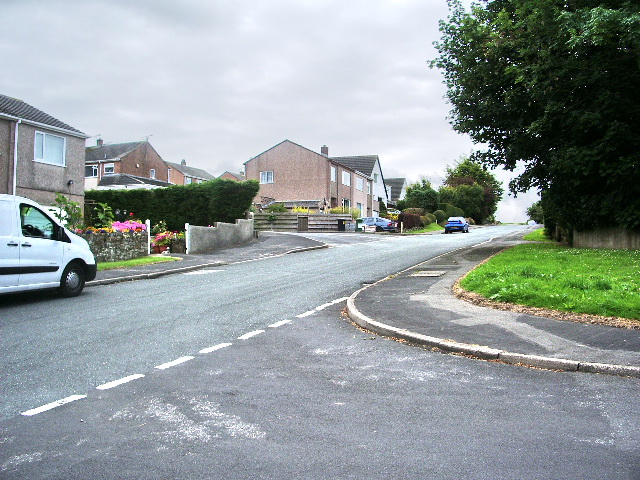
- Moor Road

- Location in Allerdale, Cumbria Location within Cumbria
- Area: 0.465 km^{2} (0.180 sq mi)
- Population: 1,705 (2018 estimate)
  - Density: 3,667/km^{2} (9,500/sq mi)
- Civil parish: Workington
- Unitary authority: Cumberland
- Ceremonial county: Cumbria
- Region: North West
- Country: England
- Sovereign state: United Kingdom
- Police: Cumbria
- Fire: Cumbria
- Ambulance: North West

Stainburn is a settlement and former civil parish about 7 miles from Whitehaven, now in the parish of Workington, in the county of Cumbria, England. In 2018 the built-up area had an estimated population of 1705. Stainburn was also a ward, in 2011 the ward had a population of 1694. Stainburn was on the A66 road until 20 December 2002 when it was bypassed.

== Amenities ==
Stainburn has a pub called The Briery ran by acclaimed Scottish chef Mark Greenaway on Stainburn Road. There was formerly a chapel that was probably about a quarter of a mile from the village but there are no remains.

== History ==
The name "Stainburn" means 'Stony stream'. Stainburn was formerly a township in the parish of Workington, from 1866 Stainburn was a civil parish in its own right until 1 April 1934 when it was abolished and merged with Workington and Winscales parishes. In 1931, the last census before the parish was abolished, Stainburn had a population of 246.
