= Waterhead, Cumberland =

Civil parish in Cumbria, England

Coordinates: 54.99°N 2.63°W

Waterhead
- Civil parish
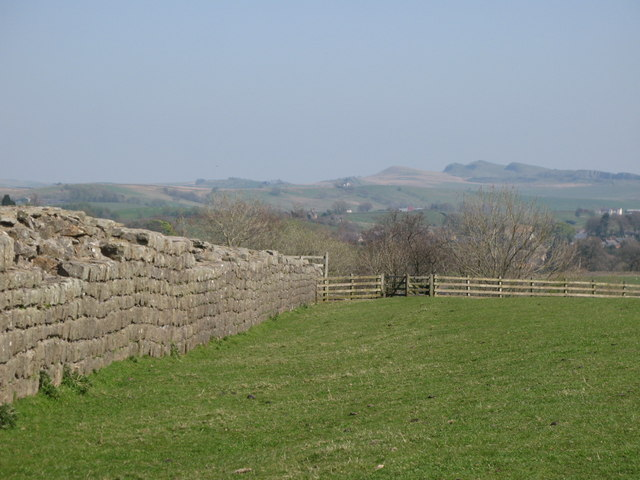
- Hadrian's Wall in the parish, west of Milecastle 49

- Location within Cumbria
- Population: 110 (2021)
- Civil parish: Waterhead
- Ceremonial county: Cumbria
- Region: North West
- Country: England
- Sovereign state: United Kingdom
- Police: Cumbria
- Fire: Cumbria
- Ambulance: North West
- UK Parliament: Carlisle

Waterhead is a civil parish in the Cumberland district, Cumbria, England. At the 2021 census it had a population of 110.

The east and south boundaries of the parish are largely formed by the River Irthing. The area of the parish is 1,838.88 hectares (7.1000 sq mi). Part of the village of Gilsland lies in the parish, while some of the village is in Northumberland.

A section of Hadrian's Wall, with Birdoswald Roman fort, and the related Hadrian's Wall Path both lie within the parish, near its southern border.

There is a parish council, the lowest tier of local government.

The B6318 road from Langholm to Gilsland passes through the parish.

== Listed buildings ==
As of 2017 the parish contains eight listed buildings, all at grade II.
