= Penrith Rural District =

Former rural district in Cumberland, England

Coordinates: 54.68°N 2.80°W

- History
  - Created: 1894
  - Abolished: 1974
  - Succeeded by: Eden District Council
- Status: Rural District
  - HQ: Mansion House, Penrith

Penrith was a rural district within the administrative county of Cumberland, England that existed from 1894 to 1974 with slight boundary changes in 1934.

The district largely corresponded to the ancient Leath Ward of Cumberland but excluding the parishes of Penrith and Alston with Garrigill. The area had been a rural sanitary district prior to the Local Government Act 1894. Penrith itself was covered by Penrith Urban District, which the Rural District surrounded on the west, north and east.

The council was based at offices known as Mansion House in Penrith which were used by its successor authority Eden District Council.

Within the district's boundaries was a small part of the Lake District National Park.

The district was abolished by the Local Government Act 1972 on 1 April 1974, being merged with other districts to form the Eden district.

At its demise in 1974 the district was divided into the civil parishes of:

- Ainstable
- Castle Sowerby
- Catterlen (including Newton Reigny)
- Culgaith (including Kirkland, Skirwirth and Blencarn)
- Dacre
- Glassonby (including Gamblesby)
- Great Salkeld
- Greystoke
- Hesket (formerly Hesket-in-the-Forest and Plumpton parishes)
- Hunsonby (formerly Hunsonby & Winskill and Little Salkeld parishes)
- Hutton
- Kirkoswald (formerly the parishes of Kirkoswald, Staffield and Renwick)
- Langwathby (including Edenhall)
- Lazonby
- Matterdale
- Mungrisdale
- Ousby
- Skelton
- Threlkeld

The name Penrith Rural was resurrected as a new electoral division of Cumbria in the 1990s but did not include any of the area once administered by the Penrith RDC and does in fact covered an area of the ancient county of Westmorland. The division was abolished in 2023 with the creation of the unitary authority of Westmorland and Furness.
