= Calder, Cumbria =

Hamlet in Cumbria, England

Coordinates: 54.4177°N 3.4886°W

Calder
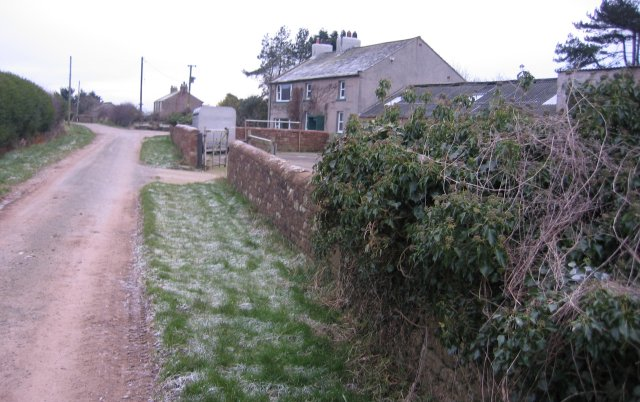
- Calder Farm

- Location in Copeland Borough Location within Cumbria
- OS grid reference: NY0303
- Civil parish: Ponsonby
- Unitary authority: Cumberland
- Ceremonial county: Cumbria
- Region: North West
- Country: England
- Sovereign state: United Kingdom
- Post town: SEASCALE
- Postcode district: CA20
- Dialling code: 019467
- Police: Cumbria
- Fire: Cumbria
- Ambulance: North West
- UK Parliament: Whitehaven and Workington

Calder is a small hamlet in Cumbria, England.

It is overlooked by the Sellafield nuclear plant—Calder Hall Nuclear Power Station was the world's first major nuclear power station when it opened in 1956.
