= Stapleton (surname) =

Stapleton is an English surname dating back to the times of the Anglo-Saxon tribes of Britain. It is a habitation name; examples of habitations are found in Cumbria, Gloucestershire, Herefordshire, Leicestershire, Shropshire, Somerset, and Yorkshire. The name is derived from the Old English words stapol meaning post and ton meaning settlement.

Notable people and characters with the surname include:

== Arts and entertainment ==
- Chris Stapleton (born 1978), American singer-songwriter
- Cyril Stapleton (1914–1974), British violinist and bandleader
- Fergal Stapleton (born 1961), Irish artist
- Jacinta Stapleton (born 1979), Australian actress
- Jean Stapleton (1923–2013), American actress
- Liam Stapleton (born 1996), Australian radio presenter
- Maureen Stapleton (1925–2006), American actress
- Nicola Stapleton (born 1974), English actress
- Oliver Stapleton (born 1948), English cinematographer
- Peter Stapleton (1954–2020), New Zealand musician
- Robyn Stapleton, Scottish singer
- Steven Stapleton (born 1957), British musician
- Sullivan Stapleton (born 1977), Australian actor

== Business ==
- Bob Stapleton (born 1958), American entrepreneur
- Patrick J. Stapleton III (active from 1997), member of the Pennsylvania Liquor Control Board, son of Patrick J. Stapleton, Jr.
- Thomas Stapleton (antiquary) (1805–1849), English landowner
- Walker Stapleton (born 1974), American businessman and state treasurer

== Military ==
- Deryck Stapleton (1918–2018), British bomber pilot and Air Vice Marshal
- Gerald Stapleton (1920–2010), British fighter pilot
- Sir Miles Stapleton (1408–1466), English knight
- Sir Miles Stapleton of Bedale or of Cotherstone (1320?–1364), English knight

== Politics and government ==
- Benjamin F. Stapleton (1869–1950), American politician
- Charles W. Stapleton (1853–1935), American lawyer and politician
- Craig Roberts Stapleton (born 1945), U.S. ambassador
- John Stapleton (MP) (1816–1891), English MP for Berwick-upon-Tweed
- Patrick J. Stapleton Jr. (1924–2001), U.S. politician in Pennsylvania, father of Patrick J. Stapleton III
- Philip Stapleton (1603–1647), English politician
- Richard F. Stapleton (1831–?), American politician
- Sheryl Williams Stapleton (born 1958), American politician
- Thomas J. Stapleton (born 1947), Democratic member of the Pennsylvania House of Representatives
- Walker Stapleton (born 1974), American politician
- Walter King Stapleton (born 1934), American federal judge
- William Stapleton (MP for Carlisle), MP for Carlisle
- Sir William Stapleton, 1st Baronet, also see List of colonial governors of Nevis
- Sir William Stapleton, 4th Baronet (c. 1698 – 1740), English politician, son of the governor

== Scholars ==
- Henry Ernest Stapleton (1878–1962), English chemist and historian of alchemy and chemistry

== Sports ==
=== Baseball ===
- Dave Stapleton (infielder) (born 1954), baseball player who played with the Boston Red Sox 1980–86
- Dave Stapleton (pitcher) (born 1961), baseball player who played with the Milwaukee Brewers 1987–88

=== Football (soccer) ===
- Frank Stapleton (born 1956), Irish association and Manchester United football player
- Jessie Stapleton (born 2005), Irish association football player
- Laurence Stapleton, English footballer
- Paul Stapleton, English football executive
- Rory Stapleton, Irish Gaelic football player

=== Football (American) ===
- Clay Stapleton (1921–2014), American football player and coach
- Darnell Stapleton (born 1985), American football player

=== Ice hockey ===
- Mike Stapleton (born 1966), American ice hockey player
- Pat Stapleton (ice hockey) (1940–2020), Canadian ice hockey player
- Tim Stapleton (born 1982), American ice hockey player

=== Other sports ===
- Brett Stapleton (born 1987), Australian rugby union player
- Craig Stapleton (rugby league) (born 1978), Australian rugby league footballer
- Eddie Stapleton (1930–2005), Australian rugby union player
- Harold Stapleton (1915–2015), Australian cricketer
- Jim Stapleton (1863–1949), Irish hurler
- Paddy Stapleton (born 1985), Irish hurler
- Thomas Stapleton (hurler) (born 1988), Irish hurler
- Timmy Stapleton, Irish hurler
- Tom Stapleton (footballer) (1907–1977), Australian rules footballer
- Tom Stapleton (hurler), Irish athlete
- Xavian Stapleton (born 1996), American basketball player

== Journalism ==
- John Stapleton (English journalist) (1946–2025), English journalist and broadcaster
- John Stapleton (Australian journalist) (born 1952), Australian journalist
- Sally Stapleton (born 1957), American photojournalist

== Religion ==
- Ruth Carter Stapleton (1929–1983), American Christian evangelist
- Theobald Stapleton (1589–1647), Irish Roman Catholic priest
- Thomas Stapleton (theologian) (1535–1598), English Catholic controversialist

== Other fields ==
- Augustus Stapleton (1800–1880), British biographer and political pamphleteer

== Disambiguation pages ==
- Craig Stapleton (disambiguation), several persons
- Dave Stapleton (disambiguation), several persons
- John Stapleton (disambiguation), several persons
- Patrick Stapleton (disambiguation), several persons
- Thomas Stapleton (disambiguation), several persons
- William Stapleton (disambiguation), several persons

== Fictional characters ==
- Rita Stapleton, a heroine on the CBS soap opera The Guiding Light during the 1970s and early '80s
- Jack and Beryl Stapleton, characters from The Hound of the Baskervilles
- The Stapleton family, the main characters in a series of historical novels by Thomas Fleming
