= Thomas de la More =

15th-century English royal official

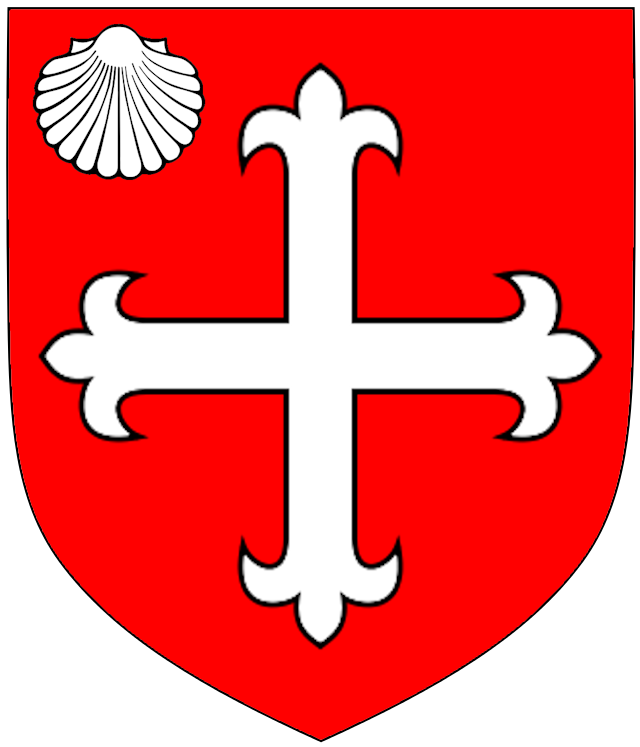
- Arms of de la More, blazoned A cross flory, with a scallop in dexter chief.

Sheriff of Cumberland
- In office 1430, 1443–1446, 1447–1448, 1452–1453

MP for Cumberland
- In office 1420, 1429, 1450, 1455

Escheator of Cumberland
- In office 1431–1435

Justice of the peace
- In office 1447–1448, 1448–1452, 1452–death

Personal details
- Born: c. 1395
- Died: 1459, 1460 or 1461
- Resting place: Brampton Old Church chancel 54.564668°N 2.455868°W
- Spouses: Maud Sandford (or Idione); Margaret
- Children: Margaret; Isabel
- Occupation: Royal official; Member of Parliament

Thomas de la More (also Dalamore or Delamore; 1395 – 1459 / 1460 / 1 June 1461) was a fifteenth-century sheriff of Cumberland. Little is known of his early years, but he was a royal official in Cumberland and Westmorland for all his adult life, serving as member of parliament, escheator and justice of the peace on multiple occasions. Although never wealthy, de la More was a man of social and political significance in the area and regularly acted on behalf of his fellow gentry. He entered the circle of Richard Neville, Earl of Salisbury at some point in the 1440s. He was frequently appointed sheriff of Cumberland. Because of this, and his close connection to the Percy family's rivals, the Nevilles, he eventually became involved in the struggle for local supremacy in the 1450s that broke out between the two families. Between 1453 and 1454, his men were beaten and threatened by Thomas Percy, Lord Egremont. In 1455, de la More petitioned the King, accusing Egremont of rampaging through Cumberland, assaulting de la More and threatening his life. He claimed this prevented him, as sheriff, from collecting money for the Treasury, although the damage to the land from Scottish incursions was more to blame. De la More played no active part in the Wars of the Roses, which broke out the same year.

De la More is known to have married, although how often and to whom is debated; his wife or wives were either called Maud, Idione or Margaret, and either Maud or Margaret may have survived him. He left two daughters, Margaret and Isabel, who both married into local families of significant rank. De la More died sometime between 1459 and 1461 and was probably buried in a family vault in Brampton Old Church, Cumberland.

== Early life and marriage ==
The earlier history of the family is obscure, although they are known to have settled in the county Cumberland, in the north of England, during the reign of King Henry III (1216–1272), and may have held the manor of Kirkdale in 1280. A John More was verderer of Inglewood Forest and died in 1377. Another John, of Cumcatch, Cumberland, represented the county at the 1404 parliament and helped negotiate the truce with Scotland three years later. The medievalist Carole Rawcliffe has suggested that Thomas was "almost certainly related to [the latter] John, who may just possibly have been [his] father". Continuing the uncertainty, little is also known of Thomas's early life. According to his own testimony, he was born in 1395. The parliamentary historian J. C. Wedgwood originally suggested that he may have been the son of a namesake who attended the 1420 parliament. Rawcliffe, however, has demonstrated that Wedgwood "mistakenly assumed that two different men, father and son, must have sat for Cumberland in 1420 and 1450, whereas they were one and the same". A William More, who died in 1434, also represented the county at the 1407 parliament and was probably a relation of John; Rawcliffe states that William was a kinsman of de la More.

According to the medievalist Peter Booth, de la More probably trained as a lawyer. In 1415, he was discovered leading secret raiding parties across the Scottish border and was arrested by officers of the Warden of the East March for breaking the truce. At some point, de la More came into lands in Cumcatch, which he augmented by purchasing property in Branthwaite and taking out a 20-year lease on the manors of West Farlam and Sebergham, suburbs of Carlisle, from the Crown.

=== Family ===
De la More's domestic situation is confused, with the names and even the number of his wives disputed. Wedgwood and Rawcliffe both agree that he married into the powerful Sandford family, and further, says Rawcliffe, that his wife brought him the manor of Little Asby by jointure in 1419. (Note: Jointure was a method of providing for widows after the husband's death. In a form of prenuptial agreement, he would settle designated lands upon himself and his wife, to be held jointly, so that if he predeceased her, she would continue to enjoy the profits after his death. Jointures were usually entailed so that on her death, the jointure would descend to their children.) Rawcliffe calls her Maud, but Wedgwood names her Idione Sandford. (Note: Also spelt Ideone or Idonea, this was the name of William Sandford's mother, who had died in 1420.) Either way, this union would have made de la More brother-in-law to Robert Sandford of Askham, Westmorland, MP for Appleby in 1413, and an important member of the local gentry. Wiliam Sandford had also been a connection of the Neville family, and de la More's wife could count both Henry Percy, Earl of Northumberland and Ralph Neville, Earl of Westmorland among her feoffees. (Note: In late medieval England, a feoffee was a trusted friend, colleague or servant to whom one enfeoffed certain lands intending to avoid feudal dues. This effectively granted them legal seisin of the lands while keeping the use—or benefits—to oneself. The historian K. B. McFarlane compares the mechanism to the creation of a trust, which "could make a great landowner appear to die a landless man ... [if] he had conveyed the seisin to feoffees—members of a trust, an undying corporation which never suffered a minority and could not be given in marriage".)

Rawcliffe also proposes that he married again, this time to a woman now known only as Margaret, who jointly administered his effects after his death. Most recently, Payling has intimated that he married only once, or that, at least, a wife who survived him until 1464 was also called Maud. De la More had two daughters, Margaret and Isabel.

== Royal office and parliamentary service ==
King Henry VI was six months old when his father died in 1422. Young Henry began his personal rule in 1437 and to demonstrate his coming of age, he issued a royal pardon. This was available to whoever sued for one, and de la More duly availed himself. (Note: General pardons were issued by the King rather than requested by a plaintiff and excused almost every offence there was a statute for. These ranged from treason, murder, and rape to marrying without a royal license, trespass or buying land without permission. It was, argues Storey, "quicker and much cheaper to obtain" a pardon in this way than it was to negotiate a lengthy legal process towards the same end. At least 1,866 people requested and received a pardon in 1437; Storey notes that they included the Abbot of St Albans, John Whethamstede, and concludes that "it is obvious that not all of those who purchased a copy would have been doing so in order to evade the penalties of criminal activities".) This does not necessarily indicate that de la More had committed a crime; the economic historian Christopher Dyer notes that general pardons such as that issued in 1437 were often requested as a form of insurance against malicious accusations.

Later indictment records from the local King's Bench show that by 1429, de la More had sheltered one Robert Bell, a yeoman of Patterdale, from the law. Bell was a member of a local family who appeared frequently in the local assize records for crimes including trespass, assault, theft and killings. The Robert Bell case resulted in an arbitration taking place between de la More and Bell towards Bell's victim, Sir John Greystoke, although the nature of Bell's offence is unknown.

By the 15th century, the role of country gentry had crystallized around exercising royal authority locally, effectively its delegates. By then it was customary for the Crown to look to this class to fill local administrative and judicial posts, the most important of these being sheriff and justice of the peace. It was in offices such as these that de la More's full-time public career began. He was variously appointed royal escheator for 1431 to 1432 for both Cumberland and Westmorland, and Sheriff of Cumberland for 1443–1444, 1447–1448 and 1452–1453. De la More was also an elector of the county—effectively a voter—in 1437, 1442, 1447 and 1449. This was an important position, as elections often took place under pressure from both the Crown and local nobility, and the gentry were a highly political class. The historian K. B. McFarlane comments that "they were willing to be guided by those who had claims on their support; but it was foolish to attempt to drive them with too tight a rein", and neither Crown nor local aristocracy could guarantee their preferred candidate's election.

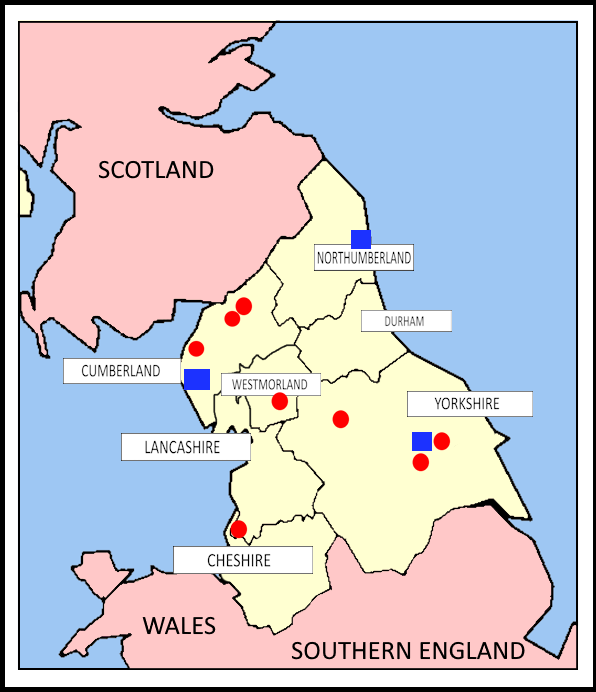
Map of Northern England in the 15th century, including places of significance in de la More's career (marked as circles; important aristocratic or regional centres indicated as rectangles). (Clickable image: use cursor to identify.)

De la More was elected Member of Parliament (MP) for Cumberland four times, in 1420, 1429, 1450 and 1455. His second election involved de la More in what Rawcliffe has called "a flagrant breach of the law", and which demonstrates the power a sheriff had over an election: they were "perhaps best placed to influence an election, either in their own interest or that of another party". His fellow candidate, Sir William Leigh, was not favoured by the then-sheriff Christopher Moresby, who replaced Leigh with his own choice of candidate, Sir Thomas Parr, at the first opportunity. This was done without consulting the county court as was required. That Moresby could commit this political chicanery was due to the original writs of summons being superseded by another that arrived too late for the election. He had only to write Parr's and de la More's names on the new writ before returning it. The subsequent investigation into Moresby extended into de la More's own first term as sheriff. (Note: The period 1427–1429 was, argues the historian Susan E. James, one of "fraudulent sheriffs, ineligible electors and falsely-returned knights" in Cumberland elections, with a concomitant rise in election disputes of which Parr's was just one. Elections such as Parr's eventually led to the Electors of Knights of the Shires Act 1429 (8 Hen. 6. c. 7) later the same year.) The most powerful and influential aristocratic families in the region were the Nevilles, based in Carlisle, and the Percys in Cockermouth; the historian Henry Summerson has suggested that this election is an early indicator of rivalry between them, as Leigh may have been a Percy retainer. This thesis, however, has been challenged by Simon Payling, who argues that Leigh lacked full Percy backing, and that in any case, that there is no independent evidence for the existence of such rivalry between the two families at this point.

De la More took the 1434 oath not to harbour criminals and disturbers of the King's Peace; those who took the oath promised "that they would neither use their wealth and influence to undertake criminal activities nor maintain lesser men" who did. This indicates, argues the prosopographer Gilbert Bogner, that de la More was a propertied man, effectively at knightly level, and a "prominent" member of the gentry. The historian R. A. Griffiths suggests that men such as de la More were "socially prominent or politically powerful" in their regions. De la More performed legal services for his neighbours also. For example, he was executor to his colleague Sir Robert Lowther's will in 1430, and sat on an assize assessing William Stapleton's claim to an estate in Black Hall. He also presented oral evidence to his kinsman William de la More's inquisition post mortem (IPM) (Note: Professor Michael Hicks describes inquisitions post mortem ("after death") as "the product of sworn enquiries by local jurors into the landholdings after the death of feudal tenants". They sat on the orders of the Crown, effectively as a means for the King to ensure he was not dispossessed of land he had previously granted the tenant. They also allowed the King, more broadly, to keep track of his feudal rights.) and acted as a mainpernor (Note: A mainpernor acted as a guarantor to someone undergoing legal proceedings, which allowed them to be released on the mainpernor's bond. A form of bail, it differed in that an individual released on bail could be seized at any moment, whereas one released under mainprise could not, and, indeed, could sue if he was.) to others. In the tax of 1436, his annual income was valued at £20, and although this was probably an underestimate, he was not among the wealthiest of the gentry elite. This figure was, however, well over the £5 annual income which Dyer has established to have been considered by the Crown as "marking a significant social benchmark". (Note: Dyer posits that a gentleman was worth at least £10 a year, and an esquire twice that, although the terms were relatively imprecise and could be used somewhat interchangeably.) Booth has argued that men of de la More's rank did not usually achieve the position of sheriff; escheator, he suggests, was usually the highest rank they could expect to reach. It was not his wealth, though, suggests Payling, that led to his important position in Cumberland society: "he owed that to his place in the service of Richard Neville, Earl of Salisbury". Salisbury was Warden of the West Marches—effectively the King's guardian of the border with Scotland—and one of the most powerful men in the country. As sheriff, de la More was thus placed in close contact with the earl, as the warden and the sheriff had to work together.

When de la More attended the 1450 parliament, it was his first in over 20 years. Writs of summons were issued on 5 September, and at the Cumberland hustings of 17 October, he was returned as Salisbury's candidate. In what appears to have been a political compromise, de la More's co-candidate, Thomas Crackenthorpe, had been in the service of the Earl of Northumberland for several years. De la More did not stand for the next parliament, summoned for 6 March 1453, but as sheriff, he had to oversee the election. As a close connection of Salisbury's, "it would be surprising if de la More did not play a significant part in thwarting Percy interests" on that occasion, argues Payling. That there was felt to be some irregularity on de la More's part is clear; the writs had arrived in time only to hold the election a week after parliament had already assembled. The result was contested, a parliamentary commission was appointed to investigate and de la More subsequently presented 154 attestors to certify the result, far more than any other for the county that century. (Note: It was unrepresentative of the norm, as the average number of attestors was 32.) This may have been a show of the Nevilles' strength, intended to quell Percy influence; also suggestive of the role that local partisan politics played, the lead attestor was Salisbury's son, Sir Thomas Neville. Both men elected, John Skelton and Roland Vaux, were also retainers of Salisbury's.

=== Relations with the Earl of Salisbury ===
From de la More's 1454 petition: "Thomas de la more Squiyr late shiref of þe counte of cumb[er]land ..."

De la More was certainly in the Earl of Salisbury's service by 1452, and had probably been so since 1443, when he was recorded as having witnessed an arbitration between Thomas, Lord Clifford and William Stapleton at Middleham Castle. Cumberland society had become increasingly militarised. A truce with Scotland had been in force since 1450, but it was frequently broken by both sides. During More's shrievalty, the Carlisle Justices were unable to hold their sessions in 1452, and that same year, John Skelton was captured for ransom by the Scots. Sufficient damage was being done that from the late 1440s the government had recognised the erosion of the tax base in the county. By 1454, Salisbury's sons—John and Thomas—were engaged in a bitter feud with the Earl of Northumberland's sons, Thomas Percy, Lord Egremont and Sir Richard. At the same time, King Henry had become mentally incapacitated and unable to govern. The House of Lords had appointed the King's cousin—and Salisbury's brother-in-law—Richard, Duke of York, as protector during the King's illness. York, in turn, made Salisbury his Lord Chancellor in April 1454. De la More now had a close connection to one of the most important officers of state. He was one of a select circle of Salisbury's retainers whom the new chancellor allowed to sue for debt in chancery. (Note: This was a privilege traditionally only granted to clerks and other court officials.) Favourable treatment such as this led the medievalist R. L. Storey to describe de la More as Salisbury's "protégé".

The King recovered in January 1455, and York and Salisbury lost their offices. National politics, already split along partisan lines, turned into outright war, a period now known as the Wars of the Roses. York and Salisbury, possibly fearing their enemies would turn the King against them, launched a preemptive strike. They ambushed and defeated Henry VI at the First Battle of St Albans on 22 May. Among the dead were personal enemies of York and the Nevilles: the Duke of Somerset and the Earl of Northumberland, respectively. The King was returned to York's keeping, and the next month he held another Parliament. Simon Payling, writing for the History of Parliament Trust, notes that when de la More stood for this Parliament and was again elected, there was no compromise such as had characterised previous hustings. Indeed, Percy servants were notable by their absence.

During York's Parliament, the King again issued a general pardon, and again de la More accepted on 10 October 1455. Both of de la More's pardons, suggests Rawcliffe, were "no doubt to cover himself from charges of malpractice in office". In the latter document, he is listed as "of Comberkath, Cumberland, esq., alias gent., alias late (Note: In this context, "late" means ex–, rather than in 21st-century usage of being dead; the Middle English Compendium gives examples of its use with "until lately holding office" or "until recently".) of London". The latter designation may have been the result of de la More's attendance at York's parliament between 1455 and 1456.

=== Confrontation with Lord Egremont and petition to the King ===
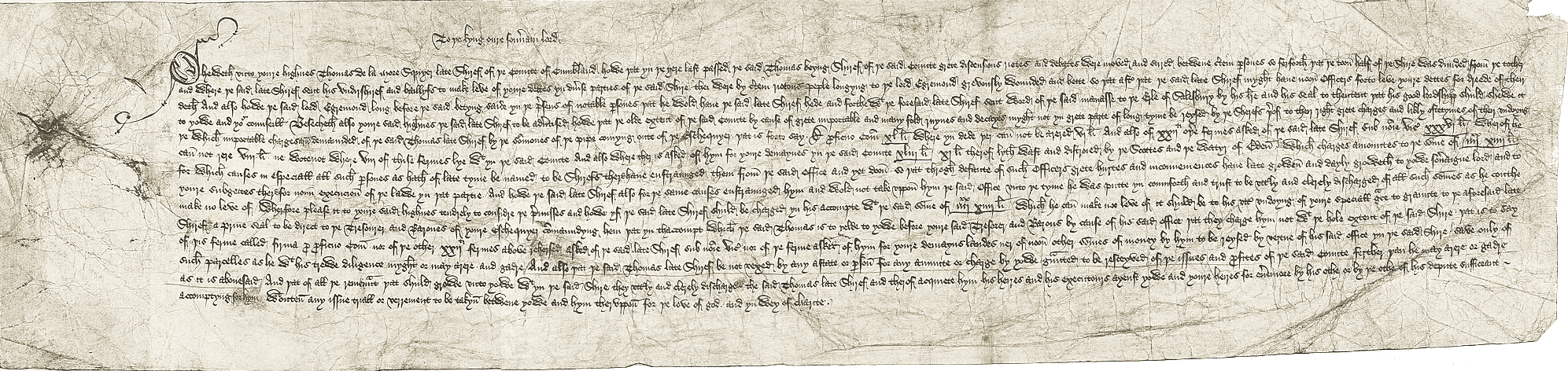
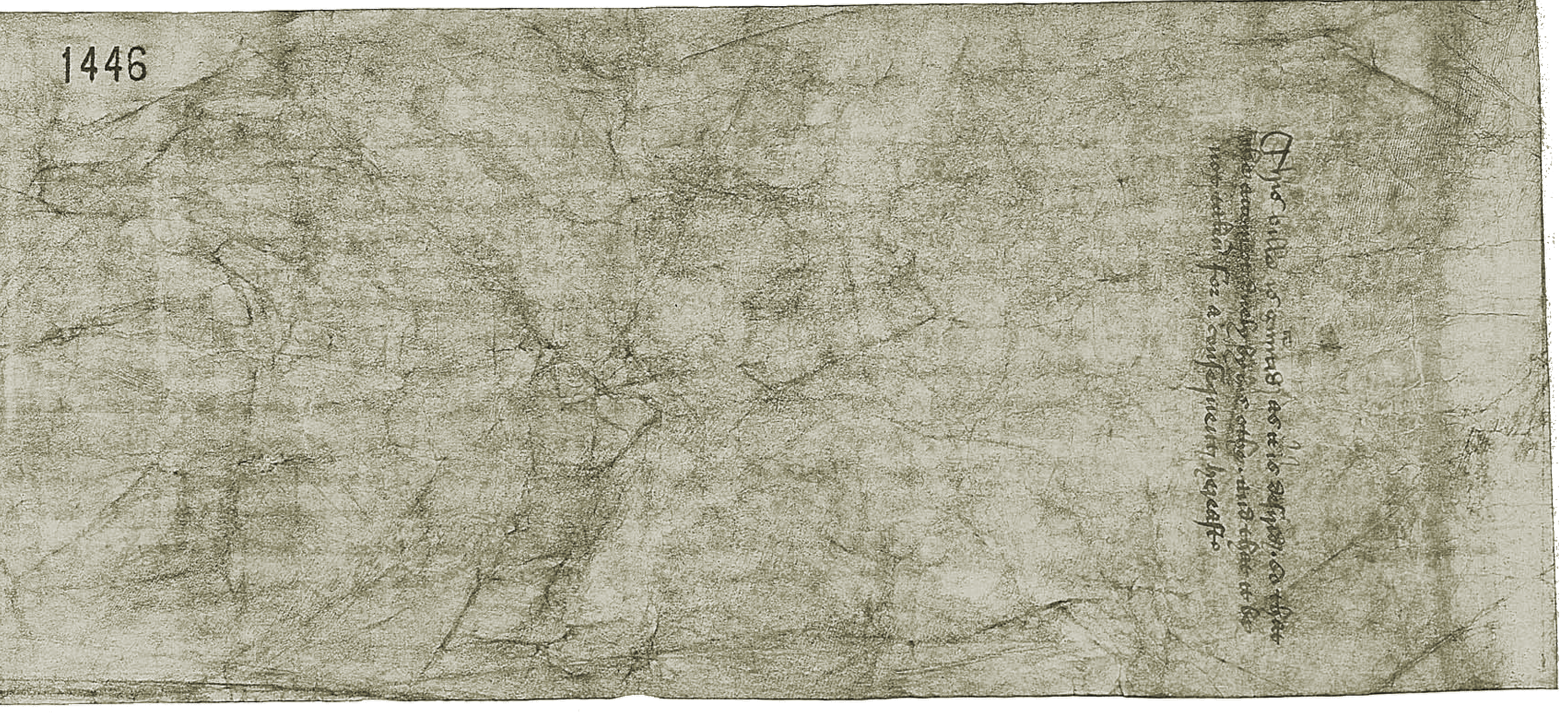
- The petition is held at the National Archives in Kew, classified as SC 8/29/1446. It has been transcribed and published by the literary scholar J. H. Fisher in his Anthology of Chancery English.

Due to the families both owning land in the region, the Percy–Neville feud spilt over from Yorkshire into North West England. With lawlessness and disorder in Cumberland beyond royal control, Egremont was free to attack royal officers. As sheriff in 1453, this attack directly affected de la More. After his term expired, he involved Salisbury, who was still chancellor, in his case. De la More, in his petition, stated that he sent word of Egremont's menaces to Salisbury by sealed letter, with the intent that Salisbury would show the letter to the King and his council. (Note: De la More's exact phrasing was that he "sent word of þe said manasse to þe Erle of Salesbury by his lettre and his seal to thentent þat his good lordshipp shuld shewe it to yowe and your counseill".) In July 1454, he petitioned the King, by way of Salisbury in chancery, that during de la More's last period as sheriff, Lord Egremont had prevented him from carrying out his official duties. Egremont, with "certein riotous Peple", de la More complained, had assaulted him, his deputies and his servants, and had threatened to have him beheaded. Egremont's violence, continued de la More, meant that "the one half of the shire was divided from the other" and that his tenure as sheriff was punctuated with "great dissensions, riots and debates". De la More acted in the knowledge that Salisbury would take the opportunity to demonstrate his good lordship to a servant. (Note: Late medieval feudalism—known by historians as bastard feudalism—was predicated on mutual benefit to both a lord and those he retained. In the same way as a lord could summon his retainers to do him service, a retainer could conversely expect his lord to support him in his cause, if necessary, with force.) Conversely, argues the historian Mark Ormrod, he may have believed the King would be more likely to act on the petition if it came to him from Henry's own chancellor rather than an ex-sheriff. In context, argues Booth, the incident was part of the wider political struggle for dominance in the West March between the Percy and Neville families. Egremont was unable to challenge de la More's claims. By the time of the petition, Egremont and other Percys had been defeated by the Nevilles in a confrontation at Stamford Bridge, outside of York, and Egremont had been summarily despatched to London's Newgate Prison in chains. (Note: Egremont eventually escaped from Newgate in November 1456.) Booth suggests that, since this petition was presented "obviously some time" after the events took place, it is probable that de la More had previously sent word to Salisbury about it, and now that Salisbury was in power, it was useful to him as reinforcement of Salisbury's case against the Percy brothers.

De la More's petition is effectively in two sections. First, he iterated his complaints against Egremont. Second—and more importantly—he requested a royal pardon for not presenting his full shrieval dues to the Exchequer. Although in the first section, he suggested that this was due to Egremont's threats, he expanded on the cause in the second. The money was not there to be collected, he said, and this was predominantly due to Scottish raids which had "lyth wast and destroyed" the countryside. De la More was keen that he be respited the amount he had been unable to raise. This was granted on the condition that it would not set a precedent and that de la More swear to his losses under oath. (Note: This was, the medievalist Ian Rowney suggests, "a good result ... with many opportunities for being fined and few for profit, a sheriff considered himself fortunate if he were only marginally out of pocket at the end of his term of office".) Booth argues that de la More's preferential treatment at the Exchequer is an example of his feudal relationship with Salisbury. This favouritism was advantageous to de la More, as the Crown's creditors were finding it increasingly difficult to receive repayment. (Note: York himself was owed £26,000, and he fared better than many in his repayments.) Sheriffs of Cumberland had been petitioning for many years over the difficulty of collecting the fee farm, (Note: Since at least 1437, when John Broughton complained that although he had been ordered to "resist the malice of the Scots the king's enemies", he stated that he could not answer at the Exchequer "because of the frequent attacks of the Scots, the king's enemies, coming in those parts". Likewise, Roland Vaux, de la More's immediate predecessor, also argued that "dissensions, riots and debates moved within the shire" prevented him from submitting £70.) and De la More appears to have based his petition on that of his predecessor as sheriff, Thomas Curwen. In 1450, Curwen also petitioned the Crown regarding his failure to acquit before the Exchequer. The similarity in language and expression between the two documents makes it is likely that de la More was influenced by the precedent.

== Later career and death ==
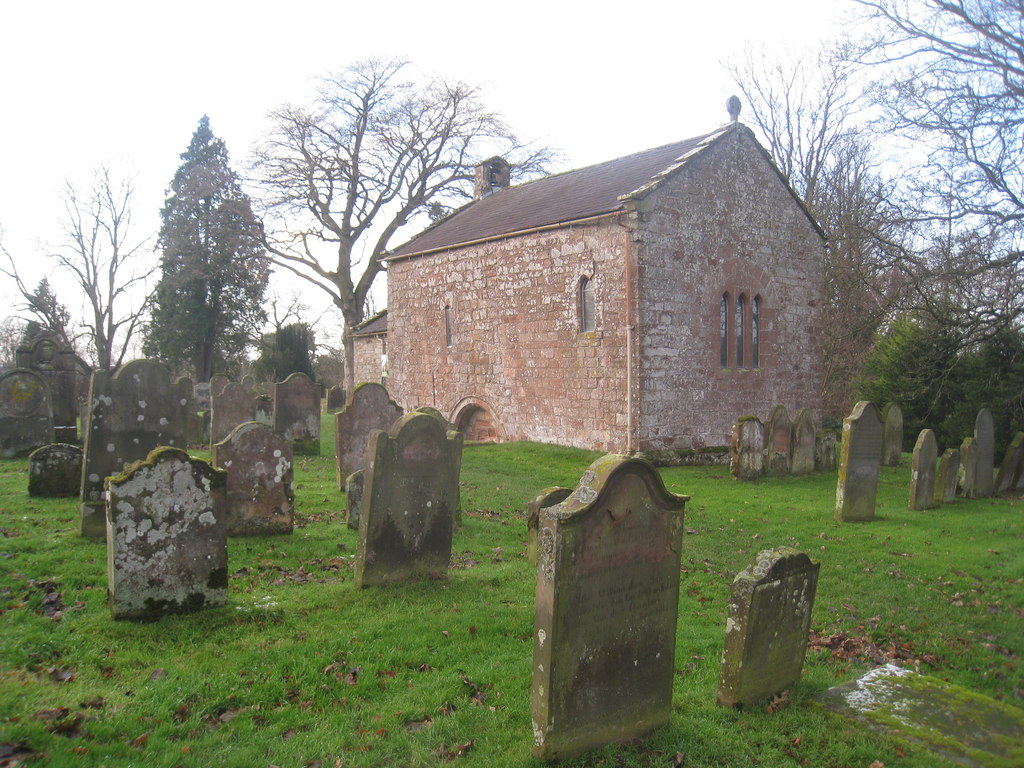
De la More's probable burial place in the chancel of Brampton Old Church. Situated in the graveyard, the chancel is all that remains of the medieval church.

De la More continued in royal service almost up to his death. The 1450s, says Payling, were an uncomfortable period for de la More. Rawcliffe, in agreement, describes it as "a particularly strenuous time" for him. He went on multiple embassies to Scotland regarding the truce, sat on the local Bench as a justice and attended Parliament twice. Meanwhile, factionalism in local Cumberland politics was on the increase following the anti-Yorkist Parliament of Devils in 1459, and both Salisbury, his son Thomas and de la More lost their places on the commission of the peace. His appointment as a keeper of the truce with Scotland in 1457 was one of his last appearances in public office. The precise date of his death is unknown, although several possibilities have been suggested. Wedgwood posits that it must have been around 1460, as de la More is not mentioned in either the 1458 or 1462 pardon rolls. Rawcliffe suggests 1461, surmising that it must have been "well before" April 1463. Payling provides a date of 1 June 1459 ("before he had to commit himself to the Nevilles" in the oncoming civil wars), the date given in a 1501 document. Either way, he probably outlived his Cumberland enemy, Lord Egremont. At the outbreak of the Wars of the Roses, Egremont remained loyal to Henry VI and, acting as the King's personal bodyguard, was slain at the Battle of Northampton in June 1460.

Before he died, de la More was suing another shrieval predecessor—who was also his brother-in-law—Hugh Lowther, for £9. Lowther was subsequently outlawed after he failed to make restitution to de la More's estate. De la More left no will, and appears to never have been knighted, as he is referred to in the records as either gentleman, esquire—for example, during his suit against Lowther—or armiger. De la More's armorial was A cross flory, with a scallop in dexter chief.

De la More's daughters were his heiresses. Margaret married Richard Hansard of Lincolnshire; Hansard's family had connections in the north, holding estates in County Durham. Hansard died on 30 December 1460 fighting for York and Salisbury at the Battle of Wakefield, where the Yorkists went down to a crushing defeat. Isabel was subsequently recorded, in her own IPM, as being "a natural idiot, incapable of managing herself or her property". This did not prevent her marriage to William Vaux of Catterlen (died c. 1481), whose cousin Roland Vaux—another county MP and sheriff—was also a Neville man and a colleague of de la More's. Roland jointly administered de la More's estate with Margaret. (Note: Like de la More, Vaux was close enough to Salisbury also to be permitted the privilege of prosecuting his debts in chancery.) Isabel and William's son, John Vaux, was later retained by Salisbury's son, Richard, Earl of Warwick. De la More was probably buried in the chancel in the graveyard of Brampton Old Church, where his family had a vault. De la More's altar-tomb face now adorns the north wall of the entry porch. (Note: This was initially situated elsewhere, but had been moved to its current location by 1874.)
