= Stapylton =

Stapylton may refer to:

== People ==
- Stapylton baronets, two extinct English baronetcies created for persons with the surname Stapylton
- Granville Chetwynd-Stapylton (1823–1915), British Army officer, became colonel of the Duke of Cornwall's Light Infantry
- John Stapylton Habgood, PC (born 1927), British retired Anglican bishop, academic, and life peer
- Robert Hunt Stapylton Dudley Lydston Newman, 1st Baron Mamhead (1871–1945), known as Sir Robert Newman, British politician
- John Stapylton Grey Pemberton (1860–1940), Member of Parliament, Vice-Chancellor of Durham University 1918–1919
- Brian Stapylton (1657–1727), of Myton in Yorkshire, English Member of Parliament
- Henry Stapylton (died 1679), English politician who sat in the House of Commons in 1648 and 1660
- John Stapylton (1683–1733), of Myton in Yorkshire, English Member of Parliament
- Philip Stapylton (1603–1647), of Warter-on-the Wolds in Yorkshire, English Member of Parliament
- Robert Stapylton (died 1669), English courtier, dramatic poet and translator
- John Stapylton-Smith (born 1961), retired New Zealand javelin thrower

== Places ==
- Stapylton County, one of the 141 Cadastral divisions of New South Wales
- Stapylton, Queensland, locality in the City of Gold Coast, Queensland, Australia

== See also ==
- Stapleton (disambiguation)
- Stapleton (surname)
