= Thomas Stapleton =

Thomas or Tom Stapleton may refer to:

- Thomas Stapleton (theologian) (1535–1598), English Catholic controversialist
- Thomas Stapleton (antiquary) (1805–1849), English landowner
- Tom Stapleton (footballer) (1907–1977), Australian rules footballer
- Thomas Stapleton (paediatrician) (1920-2007), British physician who worked in Australia
- Thomas J. Stapleton (born 1947), Democratic member of the Pennsylvania House of Representatives
- Thomas Stapleton (hurler) (born 1988), Irish hurler
- Tom Stapleton (hurler), Irish athlete in the 1880s

== See also ==
- Stapleton baronets
