= 1971 Stanley Cup Final =

1971 ice hockey championship series

| | 1 | 2 | 3 | 4 | 5 | 6 | 7 | Total |
|---|---|---|---|---|---|---|---|---|
| Montreal Canadiens | 1* | 3 | 4 | 5 | 0 | 4 | 3 | 4 |
| Chicago Black Hawks | 2* | 5 | 2 | 2 | 2 | 3 | 2 | 3 |
- * – Denotes overtime period(s)
- Location(s): Chicago: Chicago Stadium (1, 2, 5, 7); Montreal: Montreal Forum (3, 4, 6)
- Coaches: Montreal: Al MacNeil; Chicago: Bill Reay
- Captains: Montreal: Jean Beliveau; Chicago: Vacant
- Dates: May 4–18, 1971
- MVP: Ken Dryden (Canadiens)
- Series-winning goal: Henri Richard (2:34, third)
- Hall of Famers: Canadiens: Jean Beliveau (1972); Yvan Cournoyer (1982); Ken Dryden (1983); Jacques Laperriere (1987); Guy Lapointe (1993); Jacques Lemaire (1984); Frank Mahovlich (1981); Henri Richard (1979); Serge Savard (1986; did not play); Rogie Vachon (2016; did not play); Black Hawks: Tony Esposito (1988); Bobby Hull (1983); Stan Mikita (1983); Officials: Josh Ashley (1981); Neil Armstrong (1991); John D'Amico (1993); Matt Pavelich (1987)
- Networks: CBC (Canada); SRC (Canada, French); CBS (United States) (games 3, 6, and 7)
- Announcers: (CBC): Danny Gallivan and Dick Irvin Jr. (SRC): Rene Lecavalier and Gilles Tremblay (CBS): Dan Kelly, Jim Gordon, and Phil Esposito

The 1971 Stanley Cup Final was the championship series of the National Hockey League's (NHL) 1970–71 season, and the culmination of the 1971 Stanley Cup playoffs. It was contested between the Chicago Black Hawks and the Montreal Canadiens. The Black Hawks made their first appearance in the finals since 1965, while the Canadiens had last played in and won the final in 1969. The Canadiens won the series, four games to three.

== Paths to the Finals ==
The playoff system changed this year to allow cross-over between the divisions during the playoffs.

Chicago defeated the Philadelphia Flyers 4–0 and the New York Rangers 4–3 to advance to the final.

Montreal defeated the defending champion Boston Bruins 4–3 and the Minnesota North Stars 4–2. This set up the first "Original Six" Finals since the 1967 Stanley Cup Final.

== Game summaries ==
Brothers Frank and Peter Mahovlich starred for the Canadiens, scoring nine goals in the seven-game final series. Ken Dryden debuted for the Canadiens, while this was Jean Beliveau's last Finals appearance. He ended his career with ten championships. Serge Savard, who had broken his leg during the regular season, missed the entire postseason for Montreal. This was only the second time that the road team won a game seven in Finals history. The only previous time it happened was when the Toronto Maple Leafs defeated the Detroit Red Wings 2–1 in game seven in the 1945 Stanley Cup Final in Detroit. Montreal also won the series despite losing the first two games on the road; none happened again until 2009, when the Pittsburgh Penguins defeated the Red Wings in game seven by the same 2–1 score after losing the first two games to the Red Wings. The next seven-game Stanley Cup Final did not occur until the 1987 Stanley Cup Final with the Edmonton Oilers and the Philadelphia Flyers.

=== Game one ===
| May 4 | Montreal Canadiens | 1–2 | 2OT | Chicago Black Hawks | Chicago Stadium | Recap |

Despite Ken Dryden making 56 saves in net for Montreal in game one, Chicago would emerge victorious, with Jim Pappin scoring the game-winning goal in double overtime to give the Black Hawks a 2–1 victory and a 1–0 lead in the series.

Scoring summary
| Period | Team | Goal | Assist(s) | Time | Score |
|---|---|---|---|---|---|
| 1st | None | | | | |
| 2nd | MTL | Jacques Lemaire (7) – pp | J. C. Tremblay (12) and Pete Mahovlich (5) | 12:29 | 1–0 MTL |
| 3rd | CHI | Bobby Hull (9) – pp | Jim Pappin (3) and Pat Stapleton (13) | 07:54 | 1–1 |
| OT | None | | | | |
| 2OT | CHI | Jim Pappin (7) | Stan Mikita (10) and Bill White (3) | 01:11 | 2–1 CHI |
Penalty summary
| Period | Team | Player | Penalty | Time | PIM |
| 1st | CHI | Keith Magnuson | Elbowing | 01:53 | 2:00 |
| 1st | CHI | Dan Maloney | Elbowing | 04:52 | 2:00 |
| 1st | MTL | Yvan Cournoyer | Hooking | 05:27 | 2:00 |
| 1st | MTL | Frank Mahovlich | Hooking | 08:36 | 2:00 |
| 1st | MTL | Jean Beliveau | Holding | 11:26 | 2:00 |
| 2nd | CHI | Eric Nesterenko | Tripping | 10:47 | 2:00 |
| 2nd | MTL | Marc Tardif | Slashing | 13:27 | 2:00 |
| 3rd | MTL | Jacques Lemaire | Interference | 06:25 | 2:00 |
| 3rd | CHI | Rick Foley | Elbowing | 12:00 | 2:00 |
| OT | MTL | Guy Lapointe | Holding | 02:21 | 2:00 |
| OT | CHI | Bill White | Hooking | 08:37 | 2:00 |
| 2OT | None | | | | |

Shots by period
| Team | 1 | 2 | 3 | OT | 2OT | Total |
|---|---|---|---|---|---|---|
| Montreal | 12 | 12 | 7 | 6 | 0 | 37 |
| Chicago | 18 | 11 | 17 | 10 | 2 | 58 |

=== Game two ===
| May 4 | Montreal Canadiens | 3–5 | Chicago Black Hawks | Chicago Stadium | Recap |

Lou Angotti recorded four points for Chicago in game two, and Chicago took a 2–0 series lead.

Scoring summary
| Period | Team | Goal | Assist(s) | Time | Score |
|---|---|---|---|---|---|
| 1st | CHI | Bobby Hull (10) – pp | Chico Maki (5) and Lou Angotti (2) | 04:39 | 1–0 CHI |
| 1st | MTL | Jacques Lemaire (8) – pp | J. C. Tremblay (13) | 09:06 | 1–1 |
| 1st | MTL | Pete Mahovlich (6) | J. C. Tremblay (14) and Jacques Laperriere (7) | 17:58 | 2–1 MTL |
| 2nd | CHI | Chico Maki (5) | Lou Angotti (3) and Bobby Hull (9) | 11:58 | 2–2 |
| 2nd | CHI | Jim Pappin (8) | Danny O'Shea (5) and Rick Foley (1) | 13:50 | 3–2 CHI |
| 3rd | CHI | Lou Angotti (2) | Unassisted | 07:27 | 4–2 CHI |
| 3rd | MTL | Frank Mahovlich (11) | Unassisted | 08:56 | 4–3 CHI |
| 3rd | CHI | Lou Angotti (3) | Unassisted | 16:47 | 5–3 CHI |
Penalty summary
| Period | Team | Player | Penalty | Time | PIM |
| 1st | MTL | Jean Beliveau | Holding | 04:18 | 2:00 |
| 1st | CHI | Dan Maloney | Holding | 07:20 | 2:00 |
| 1st | CHI | Stan Mikita | High-sticking | 19:28 | 2:00 |
| 1st | MTL | John Ferguson | High-sticking | 19:28 | 2:00 |
| 2nd | CHI | Keith Magnuson | Cross-checking | 02:09 | 2:00 |
| 2nd | CHI | Pit Martin | Elbowing | 16:39 | 2:00 |
| 2nd | MTL | Rejean Houle | Elbowing | 16:39 | 2:00 |
| 3rd | CHI | Stan Mikita | Elbowing | 11:11 | 2:00 |
| 3rd | MTL | Terry Harper | High-sticking | 11:11 | 2:00 |

Shots by period
| Team | 1 | 2 | 3 | Total |
|---|---|---|---|---|
| Montreal | 10 | 11 | 6 | 27 |
| Chicago | 11 | 12 | 12 | 35 |

=== Game three ===
| May 9 | Chicago Black Hawks | 2–4 | Montreal Canadiens | Montreal Forum | Recap |

After Chicago took a 2–0 lead after the first period, Frank Mahovlich netted two goals for Montreal, and Yvan Cournoyer scored the game-winning goal in the third to give the Canadiens a 4–2 lead to the cut the series lead in half.

Scoring summary
| Period | Team | Goal | Assist(s) | Time | Score |
|---|---|---|---|---|---|
| 1st | CHI | Cliff Koroll (6) – pp | Bobby Hull (10) and Stan Mikita (11) | 04:26 | 1–0 CHI |
| 1st | CHI | Bobby Hull (11) | Jim Pappin (4) and Pit Martin (6) | 13:38 | 2–0 CHI |
| 2nd | MTL | Pete Mahovlich (7) | Bobby Hull (10) and Stan Mikita (11) | 05:56 | 2–1 CHI |
| 2nd | MTL | Frank Mahovlich (12) – pp | Jean Beliveau (14) and Yvan Cournoyer (11) | 17:34 | 2–2 |
| 3rd | MTL | Yvan Cournoyer (7) | Terry Harper (5) | 06:23 | 3–2 MTL |
| 3rd | MTL | Frank Mahovlich (13) – pp | Guy Lapointe (4) | 17:34 | 4–2 MTL |
Penalty summary
| Period | Team | Player | Penalty | Time | PIM |
| 1st | MTL | Pete Mahovlich | Elbowing | 03:39 | 2:00 |
| 1st | CHI | Bill White | Holding | 10:55 | 2:00 |
| 1st | CHI | Chico Maki | Cross-checking | 16:57 | 2:00 |
| 2nd | CHI | Lou Angotti | Kneeing | 03:26 | 2:00 |
| 2nd | CHI | Stan Mikita | High-sticking | 04:43 | 2:00 |
| 2nd | MTL | Yvan Cournoyer | High-sticking | 04:43 | 2:00 |
| 2nd | CHI | Pit Martin | Tripping | 07:03 | 2:00 |
| 2nd | MTL | Guy Lapointe | Tripping | 07:15 | 2:00 |
| 2nd | CHI | Bill White | Tripping | 08:13 | 2:00 |
| 2nd | CHI | Keith Magnuson | Fighting – major | 10:06 | 5:00 |
| 2nd | MTL | Jacques Lemaire | Roughing | 10:06 | 2:00 |
| 2nd | MTL | Jacques Lemaire | Fighting – major | 10:06 | 5:00 |
| 2nd | MTL | Leon Rochefort | Elbowing | 11:00 | 2:00 |
| 2nd | CHI | Jim Pappin | Slashing – double minor | 13:44 | 4:00 |
| 2nd | MTL | Phil Roberto | Slashing | 13:44 | 2:00 |
| 2nd | CHI | Bobby Hull | Hooking | 16:03 | 2:00 |
| 3rd | CHI | Danny O'Shea | Holding | 03:22 | 2:00 |
| 3rd | MTL | Rejean Houle | Tripping | 08:27 | 2:00 |
| 3rd | CHI | Bobby Hull | Hooking | 10:26 | 2:00 |
| 3rd | CHI | Lou Angotti | Fighting – major | 16:04 | 5:00 |
| 3rd | MTL | J. C. Tremblay | Fighting – major | 16:04 | 5:00 |
| 3rd | CHI | Paul Shmyr | Boarding | 18:39 | 2:00 |

Shots by period
| Team | 1 | 2 | 3 | Total |
|---|---|---|---|---|
| Chicago | 10 | 11 | 6 | 27 |
| Montreal | 11 | 12 | 12 | 35 |

=== Game four ===
| May 11 | Chicago Black Hawks | 2–5 | Montreal Canadiens | Montreal Forum | Recap |

Yvan Cournoyer recorded 3 points for Montreal in game four, giving the Canadiens a 5–2 victory to tie the series.

Scoring summary
| Period | Team | Goal | Assist(s) | Time | Score |
|---|---|---|---|---|---|
| 1st | MTL | Pete Mahovlich (8) | Terry Harper (6) and Jacques Laperriere (8) | 01:00 | 1–0 MTL |
| 1st | CHI | Stan Mikita (5) – pp | Cliff Koroll (7) and Pat Stapleton (14) | 03:09 | 1–1 |
| 1st | MTL | Jean Beliveau (6) – pp | Yvan Cournoyer (12) and Frank Mahovlich (10) | 06:55 | 2–1 MTL |
| 1st | MTL | Guy Lapointe (4) | Rejean Houle (3) and Henri Richard (7) | 16:33 | 3–1 MTL |
| 2nd | MTL | Yvan Cournoyer (8) | Unassisted | 09:07 | 4–1 MTL |
| 2nd | CHI | Dennis Hull (5) | Stan Mikita (12) | 12:30 | 4–2 MTL |
| 2nd | MTL | Yvan Cournoyer (9) – pp | Frank Mahovlich (11) and Pete Mahovlich (12) | 15:53 | 5–2 MTL |
| 3rd | None | | | | |
Penalty summary
| Period | Team | Player | Penalty | Time | PIM |
| 1st | MTL | Jean Beliveau | Tripping | 04:18 | 2:00 |
| 1st | CHI | Cliff Koroll | High-sticking | 07:20 | 2:00 |
| 1st | MTL | Jacques Laperriere | Interference | 14:41 | 2:00 |
| 1st | CHI | Rick Foley | Holding | 15:52 | 2:00 |
| 2nd | MTL | Yvan Cournoyer | Tripping | 04:18 | 2:00 |
| 2nd | CHI | Gerry Pinder | High-sticking | 09:28 | 2:00 |
| 2nd | MTL | Leon Rochefort | Charging | 09:28 | 2:00 |
| 2nd | CHI | Chico Maki | Elbowing | 15:32 | 2:00 |
| 3rd | CHI | Bill White | Tripping | 01:39 | 2:00 |
| 3rd | CHI | Lou Angotti | Slashing | 03:20 | 2:00 |
| 3rd | MTL | Pete Mahovlich | Elbowing | 03:20 | 2:00 |
| 3rd | MTL | Marc Tardif | Interference | 12:20 | 2:00 |
| 3rd | CHI | Keith Magnuson | Fighting – major | 16:08 | 5:00 |
| 3rd | CHI | Keith Magnuson | Misconduct | 16:08 | 10:00 |
| 3rd | CHI | Danny O'Shea | Fighting – major | 16:08 | 5:00 |
| 3rd | CHI | Paul Shmyr | Fighting – major | 16:08 | 5:00 |
| 3rd | CHI | Paul Shmyr | Misconduct | 16:08 | 10:00 |
| 3rd | MTL | Guy Lapointe | Fighting – major | 16:08 | 5:00 |
| 3rd | MTL | Guy Lapointe | Misconduct | 16:08 | 10:00 |
| 3rd | MTL | Phil Roberto | Fighting – major | 16:08 | 5:00 |
| 3rd | MTL | Marc Tardif | Fighting – major | 16:08 | 5:00 |
| 3rd | MTL | Marc Tardif | Misconduct | 16:08 | 10:00 |
| 3rd | CHI | Jerry Korab | High-sticking | 17:05 | 2:00 |
| 3rd | CHI | Jerry Korab | Spearing | 17:05 | 2:00 |
| 3rd | CHI | Jerry Korab | Misconduct | 17:05 | 10:00 |
| 3rd | MTL | Frank Mahovlich | High-sticking | 17:05 | 2:00 |

Shots by period
| Team | 1 | 2 | 3 | Total |
|---|---|---|---|---|
| Chicago | 10 | 17 | 5 | 32 |
| Montreal | 16 | 12 | 4 | 32 |

=== Game five ===
| May 13 | Montreal Canadiens | 0–2 | Chicago Black Hawks | Chicago Stadium | Recap |

Dennis Hull both Cliff Koroll scored for Chicago, and Tony Esposito made 31 saves to record his second shutout of the postseason. The victory gave Chicago a 3–2 series lead.

Scoring summary
| Period | Team | Goal | Assist(s) | Time | Score |
|---|---|---|---|---|---|
| 1st | CHI | Dennis Hull (6) – pp | Cliff Koroll (8) and Bobby Hull (11) | 10:57 | 1–0 CHI |
| 2nd | CHI | Cliff Koroll (7) | Dennis Hull (6) and Stan Mikita (13) | 11:26 | 2–0 CHI |
| 3rd | None | | | | |
Penalty summary
| Period | Team | Player | Penalty | Time | PIM |
| 1st | CHI | Eric Nesterenko | Holding | 04:42 | 2:00 |
| 1st | MTL | John Ferguson | High-sticking | 06:58 | 2:00 |
| 1st | CHI | Cliff Koroll | Holding | 07:41 | 2:00 |
| 1st | MTL | Henri Richard | Hooking | 10:25 | 2:00 |
| 1st | CHI | Jim Pappin | High-sticking | 14:02 | 2:00 |
| 1st | MTL | Pete Mahovlich | High-sticking | 14:02 | 2:00 |
| 1st | CHI | Bobby Hull | Elbowing | 16:45 | 2:00 |
| 1st | MTL | Terry Harper | Elbowing | 16:45 | 2:00 |
| 1st | CHI | Bill White | Holding | 18:49 | 2:00 |
| 2nd | CHI | Keith Magnuson | Interference | 04:18 | 2:00 |
| 2nd | CHI | Pete Mahovlich | Tripping | 12:57 | 2:00 |
| 3rd | CHI | Bobby Hull | Elbowing | 05:20 | 2:00 |
| 3rd | MTL | Rejean Houle | Holding | 05:20 | 2:00 |
| 3rd | CHI | Danny O'Shea | Fighting – major | 16:50 | 5:00 |
| 3rd | MTL | Phil Roberto | Fighting – major | 16:50 | 5:00 |

Shots by period
| Team | 1 | 2 | 3 | Total |
|---|---|---|---|---|
| Montreal | 10 | 12 | 9 | 31 |
| Chicago | 9 | 7 | 6 | 22 |

=== Game six ===
| May 16 | Chicago Black Hawks | 3–4 | Montreal Canadiens | Montreal Forum | Recap |

Scoring summary
| Period | Team | Goal | Assist(s) | Time | Score |
|---|---|---|---|---|---|
| 1st | CHI | Jim Pappin (9) | Unassisted | 11:25 | 1–0 CHI |
| 1st | MTL | Yvan Cournoyer (10) | Jean Beliveau (15) and Frank Mahovlich (12) | 13:38 | 1–1 |
| 2nd | MTL | Pete Mahovlich (9) | Rejean Houle (4) and John Ferguson (6) | 05:04 | 2–1 MTL |
| 2nd | CHI | Chico Maki (6) | Bill White (4) and Bobby Hull (12) | 13:38 | 2–2 |
| 2nd | CHI | Jim Pappin (10) | Doug Jarrett (6) and Bobby Hull (13) | 13:38 | 3–2 CHI |
| 3rd | MTL | Frank Mahovlich (14) | Jean Beliveau (16) | 05:10 | 3–3 |
| 3rd | MTL | Pete Mahovlich (10) – sh | Frank Mahovlich (13) | 08:56 | 4–3 MTL |
Penalty summary
| Period | Team | Player | Penalty | Time | PIM |
| 1st | MTL | Pete Mahovlich | High-sticking | 03:44 | 2:00 |
| 1st | CHI | Tony Esposito | Tripping | 04:43 | Penalty shot |
| 1st | MTL | Leon Rochefort | Cross-checking | 05:12 | 2:00 |
| 1st | CHI | Jim Pappin | High-sticking | 07:34 | 2:00 |
| 1st | MTL | Pierre Bouchard | Elbowing | 07:34 | 2:00 |
| 1st | CHI | Keith Magnuson | High-sticking | 09:41 | 2:00 |
| 1st | MTL | Pete Mahovlich | High-sticking | 09:41 | 2:00 |
| 1st | CHI | Eric Nesterenko | Cross-checking | 15:55 | 2:00 |
| 1st | MTL | Terry Harper | Hooking | 15:55 | 2:00 |
| 2nd | MTL | John Ferguson | Charging | 08:50 | 2:00 |
| 3rd | MTL | Rejean Houle | Holding | 08:46 | 2:00 |
| 3rd | CHI | Keith Magnuson | Elbowing | 11:55 | 2:00 |

Shots by period
| Team | 1 | 2 | 3 | Total |
|---|---|---|---|---|
| Chicago | 11 | 14 | 5 | 30 |
| Montreal | 5 | 6 | 5 | 16 |

=== Game seven ===
| May 18 | Montreal Canadiens | 3–2 | Chicago Black Hawks | Chicago Stadium | Recap |

After trailing 2–0 to Chicago in game seven, Jacques Lemaire took a shot from centre ice that miraculously escaped goaltender Tony Esposito cutting the Black Hawks' lead to 2–1. Henri Richard tied the game just before the end of the second period, and scored again 02:34 into the third, giving the Habs the lead. Ken Dryden kept Chicago off the board for the rest of the game, making 31 saves. Montreal won their third Stanley Cup in four years. It was the final game for Canadiens superstar and captain Jean Beliveau who retired after the season. The Canadiens were the last road team to win a Game 7 of a Stanley Cup Final until the Pittsburgh Penguins in 2009. It was Al MacNeil's final game as Montreal coach — after he had benched Richard for Game 5, The Pocket Rocket declared "[MacNeil] is the worst coach I ever played for!" Although Richard retracted his "angry comment", as he called it, MacNeil still resigned.

Scoring summary
| Period | Team | Goal | Assist(s) | Time | Score |
|---|---|---|---|---|---|
| 1st | CHI | Dennis Hull (7) – pp | Cliff Koroll (9) and Bobby Hull (14) | 19:12 | 1–0 CHI |
| 2nd | CHI | Danny O'Shea (2) | Pit Martin (7) | 07:33 | 2–0 CHI |
| 2nd | MTL | Jacques Lemaire (9) | Jacques Laperriere (9) | 14:18 | 2–1 CHI |
| 2nd | MTL | Henri Richard (4) | Jacques Lemaire (10) | 18:20 | 2–2 |
| 3rd | MTL | Henri Richard (5) | Rejean Houle (5) and Guy Lapointe (5) | 02:34 | 3–2 MTL |
Penalty summary
| Period | Team | Player | Penalty | Time | PIM |
| 1st | MTL | Terry Harper | Holding | 01:22 | 2:00 |
| 1st | CHI | Keith Magnuson | Roughing | 04:09 | 2:00 |
| 1st | MTL | Jacques Lemaire | Roughing | 04:09 | 2:00 |
| 1st | CHI | Dennis Hull | Tripping | 07:55 | 2:00 |
| 1st | MTL | Rejean Houle | Holding | 17:35 | 2:00 |
| 2nd | CHI | Keith Magnuson | Tripping | 01:49 | 2:00 |
| 2nd | CHI | Eric Nesterenko | Roughing | 03:20 | 2:00 |
| 2nd | MTL | Pete Mahovlich | Roughing | 03:20 | 2:00 |
| 2nd | CHI | Bench (served by Lou Angotti) | Too many men on the ice | 04:14 | 2:00 |
| 2nd | CHI | Keith Magnuson | Charging | 12:32 | 2:00 |
| 2nd | MTL | J. C. Tremblay | Hooking | 13:07 | 2:00 |
| 2nd | CHI | Doug Jarrett | Holding | 17:54 | 2:00 |
| 2nd | MTL | John Ferguson | Holding | 18:11 | 2:00 |
| 3rd | MTL | Terry Harper | Hooking | 05:32 | 2:00 |
| 3rd | MTL | Pete Mahovlich | Hooking | 07:37 | 2:00 |

Shots by period
| Team | 1 | 2 | 3 | Total |
|---|---|---|---|---|
| Montreal | 6 | 9 | 10 | 25 |
| Chicago | 12 | 9 | 12 | 33 |

== Coaching controversies ==
Both clubs would suffer public controversies regarding coaching performances, specifically accusations of mishandling star players during the series.

Chicago head coach Billy Reay would be attacked in the media by Hawks star forward Bobby Hull for his excessive employment of two little used forwards, Lou Angotti and Eric Nesterenko, as well as the injured defenceman Keith Magnuson in game seven. With a 2–0 Black Hawks lead, both Hull and Hawks star centre Stan Mikita were left on the bench for extended periods in favor of Angotti and Nesterenko, including two four-on-four situations. The wide open matchup should have favoured the frustrated Hull, who had been successfully shadowed in the series by Canadiens rookie Rejean Houle. The first two Canadien goals were tallied with the two backliners on the ice and the hobbled Magnuson was beaten one on one by speedy Montreal centre Henri Richard for the ultimate game winner.

The Canadiens suffered their own coaching controversy earlier in the series when head coach Al MacNeil benched alternate captain Henri Richard in game five. Following the 2–0 loss, Richard ripped MacNeil in the media calling him incompetent and "the worst coach I ever played for." Accusation of favoring English-speaking players plagued MacNeil and turned the public against him. Following death threats, MacNeil and his family were assigned body guards for the final home game in Montreal. MacNeil resigned as coach after the final and was replaced by Scotty Bowman.

== Stanley Cup engraving ==
The 1971 Stanley Cup was presented to Canadiens captain Jean Beliveau by NHL President Clarence Campbell following the Canadiens 3–2 win over the Black Hawks in game seven.

The following Canadiens players and staff had their names engraved on the Stanley Cup

1970–71 Montreal Canadiens

=== Players ===
Centres

- 4 Jean Beliveau (Captain)
- 16 Henri Richard (A)
- 20 Peter Mahovlich
- 24 Bobby Sheehan
- 25 Jacques Lemaire

Wingers

- 11 Marc Tardif
- 14 Rejean Houle
- 12 Yvan Cournoyer
- 15 Claude Larose
- 17 Phil Roberto
- 21 Leon Rochefort
- 22 John Ferguson Sr. (A)
- 24 Chuck Lefley
- 27 Frank Mahovlich (A)

Defencemen

- 2 Jacques Laperriere
- 3 Jean-Claude J. C. Tremblay
- 5 Guy Lapointe
- 18 Serge Savard†
- 19 Terry Harper (A)
- 23 Bob Murdoch
- 26 Pierre Bouchard

Goaltenders

- 29 Ken Dryden
- 1 Rogatien Vachon
- 30 Phil Myre†
- †Serge Savard played 37 regular season games, but missed the rest of season injured. †Phil Myre played 30 games, dressed for 70 games, but was not dressed in the playoffs. Both players were included in the team picture. They were not engraved on the Stanley Cup, because they did not play in the playoffs.
- #8 Larry Pleau was included on the team, but did not qualify. He played only 19 regular season games played, and did not dress in the playoffs. so his name was not included on the Stanley Cup. He would get his name on the Stanley Cup as an Asst. Manager with New York Rangers in 1994.

=== Coaching and administrative staff ===
- J. David Molson (President/Owner), William Molson (Vice President/Owner)
- Peter Molson (Vice Presidents/Owners), Sam Pollock (Vice President/General Manager)
- Ron Caron (Asst. General Manager), Al MacNeil (Head Coach)
- Yvon Belanger (Trainer)
- Phil Langlois (Asst. Trainer), Eddy Palchak (Asst Trainer)

=== Stanley Cup engraving ===
- Al MacNeil (coach) was engraved on the Stanley Cup as .COACH. MAC NEIL missing his first name "Al". MacNeil was spelled AL MACNEIL COACH on the Replica Cup. MacNeil became the first rookie coach to win the Stanley Cup as a mid-season replacement. MacNeil replaced Claude Ruel after 23 games. MacNeil was also the 11th NHL Rookie Coach to win the Stanley Cup. MacNeil only coached the last 55 regular season games for Montreal.
- Phil Roberto was misspelled P ROBRTO missing an "E". Roberto's name was corrected to P. ROBERTO on the Replica Cup created during the 1992–93 season.
- Ken Dryden would win the Conn Smythe Trophy (Playoff MVP) and Stanley Cup in 1971 and won the Calder Trophy (Rookie of the Year) in 1972. 5th player to win the Stanley Cup before winning Rookie of the Year. He is the only player to win Playoff MVP before winning Rookie of the Year.

== See also ==
- 1970–71 NHL season

== Notes ==
| Preceded by Boston Bruins; 1970 | Montreal Canadiens; Stanley Cup champions 1971 | Succeeded by Boston Bruins; 1972 |
