= William Stapleton =

William Stapleton may refer to:

- William Stapleton (died 1432), MP for Cumberland (UK Parliament constituency)
- William Stapleton (d. 1457) (c. 1390–1457), English regional commander
- William Stapleton (d. 1544) (c. 1495–1544), English politician
- Sir William Stapleton, 1st Baronet, Irish colonial administrator and planter
- Sir William Stapleton, 4th Baronet (c. 1698–1740), his son, English politician, MP for Oxfordshire
- William Stapleton (British Army officer) (died 1826), British general
