= Chronicon Petroburgense =

English historical chronicle

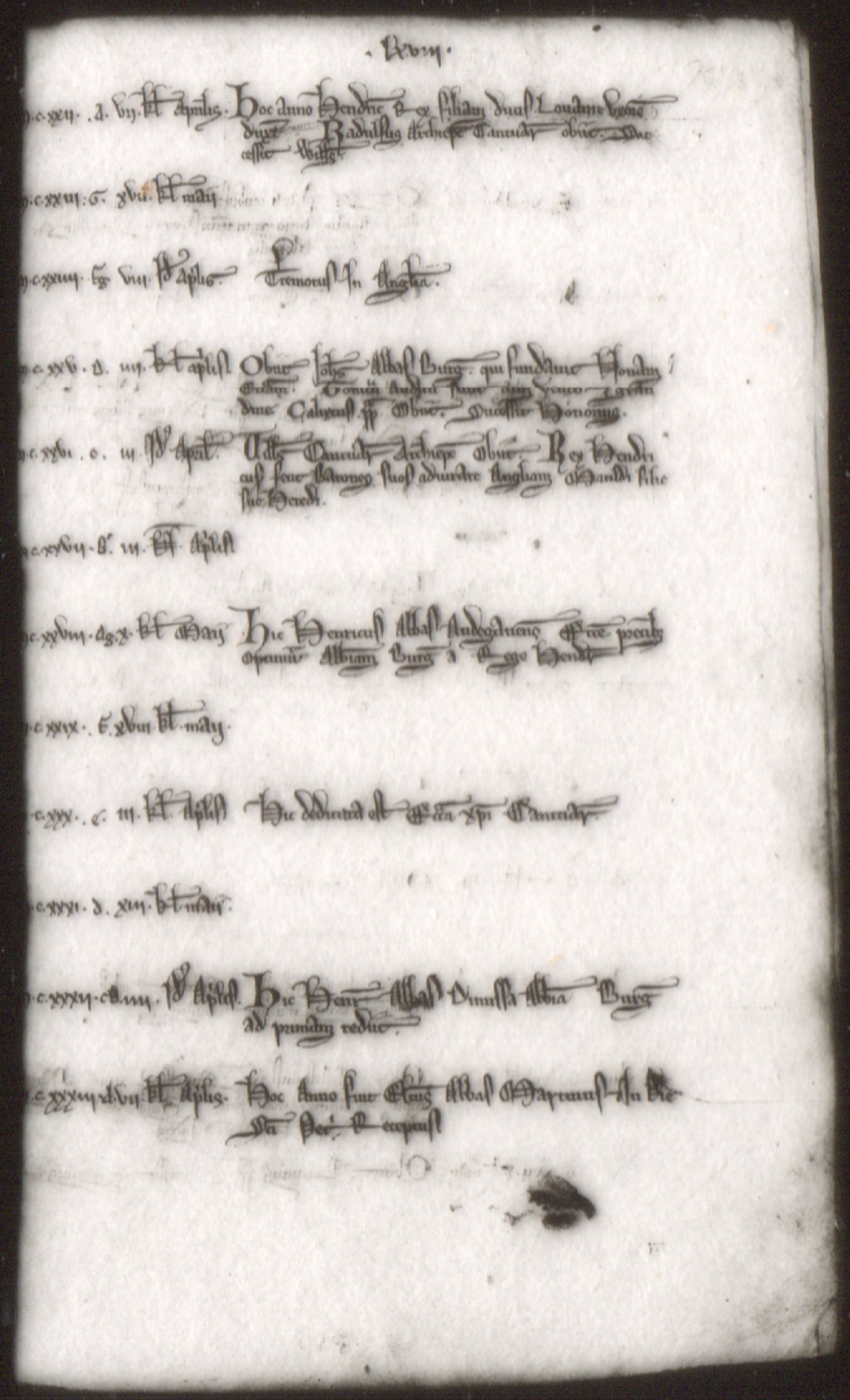
First page of the Chronicon Petroburgense, in the manuscript book Liber Niger from Peterborough Abbey

The Chronicon Petroburgense, or Peterborough Chronicle, is a 13th-century chronicle written in Medieval Latin at Peterborough Abbey, England, covering events from 1122 to 1294. It was probably written by William of Woodford, a sacrist and later abbot of Peterborough (1296–1299). It survives as part of a Peterborough cartulary known as the "Liber Niger", or "Black Book", where it appears on folios 75–80 and 85–136. (Note: The Peterborough Liber Niger is Society of Antiquaries ms. 60. While Martin groups her descriptions of cartularies and registers – "[collections of] incoming and outgoing correspondence and other administrative material [produced] during the incumbency of individual abbots" – separately, she describes the Liber Niger first in her section for cartularies. The Liber Niger is described as a "chartulary" in the relevant Victoria County History volume.) The chronicle was edited by Thomas Stapleton and published by the Camden Society in 1849, with an appendix containing a transcription of the first 20 folios of the Liber Niger. In his introduction to Stapleton's edition, John Bruce wrote that the Chronicon contained "valuable contributions to legal and constitutional history [that were] universally recognised".

== Bibliography ==
- Martin, J. (1978), The Cartularies and Registers of Peterborough Abbey, Northamptonshire Record Society, ISBN 0-901275-39-5
- Cox, J.C. (1906), "Religious houses", in Serjeantson, R.M.; Adkins, W.R.D. (eds.), A History of the County of Northampton, vol. 2, Victoria County History, Constable, OCLC 59512197
- Stapleton, T., ed. (1849), Chronicon Petroburgense, Camden Society, OCLC 604801475
