= John Bruce (antiquary) =

English antiquary

John Bruce (1802–1869) was an English antiquary, closely associated with the Camden Society.

== Life ==
He was born London, in a Scottish family. He was educated at private schools in England, and at Aberdeen Grammar School. Trained for the law, he did not practise after 1840.

Following historical and antiquarian interests, Bruce took a prominent part in the foundation of the Camden Society, held office in it as treasurer and director, and contributed to its publications. In 1861 he was appointed by the Society of Antiquaries of London a trustee of Sir John Soane's Museum.

Bruce had been a widower for some years before his death, which occurred suddenly in London, 28 October 1869.

== Works ==
For the Camden Society Bruce edited:

- The Historie of the Arrivall of Edward IV 1838 (the first volume of the society's works)
- Annals of the First Four Years of Queen Elizabeth, 1810
- Correspondence of Robert Dudley, Earl of Leycester, 1844
- Verney Papers, 1845;
- Letters of Queen Elizabeth and James VI, 1849
- Letters and Papers of the Verney Family, 1853
- Charles I in 1646, 1856
- Liber Famelicus of James Whitelocke, 1858
- Correspondence of James VI with Cecil, 1861
- Wills from Doctors Commons, with John Gough Nichols, 1863
- Accounts and Papers relating to Mary Queen of Scots, with Allan James Crosby, 1867
- Journal of a Voyage ... by Sir Kenelm Digby, 1868

and also wrote:

- Inquiry into the Genuineness of a Letter dated 3 Feb. 1613, 1864, in the Miscellany vol. 7
- Notes of the Treaty of Ripon, 1869
- introduction to Chronicon Petroburgense, 1849
- preface to Proceedings principally in the County of Kent ... from the collections of Sir E. Dering, 1861

He was for some time treasurer and vice-president of the Society of Antiquaries, and contributed papers to Archæologia. He also printed two letters relating to the affairs of the society in 1852.

Bruce wrote occasionally in the Edinburgh Review and other periodicals, and was for some years editor of the Gentleman's Magazine. For the Berkshire Ashmolean Society he edited a volume of Original Letters relating to Archbishop Laud's Benefactions, 1811, and for the Parker Society the Works of R. Hutchinson, 1842, and with Thomas Thomason Perowne the Correspondence of Archbishop Parker, 1853. In 1857 he contributed an edition of William Cowper's poems to the Aldine edition of poets. He edited the Calendars of State Papers, Domestic Series, Charles I, 1625–1639, 12 vols. published under the direction of the Master of the Rolls, 1858–1871, the last volume being completed by W. D. Hamilton, and in 1867 printed privately papers relating to William Ruthven, 1st Earl of Gowrie.

Bruce's manuscripts bequeathed to the British Museum (and now in the British Library) were: Catalogue of State Papers in the State Paper Office and the British Museum, and Class-catalogues of manuscripts in the British Museum, now British Library Add MS 28197–28202, and a classified list of the letters of William Cowper, Add MS 29716.
