= Craig Stapleton =

Craig Stapleton may refer to:

- Craig Roberts Stapleton (born 1945), U.S. ambassador
- Craig Stapleton (rugby league) (born 1978), Australian rugby league footballer
