= The Staple =

Medieval European system of trade and taxation

The Staple was a key institution in medieval England that designated towns for the overseas export of key commodities like wool, allowing the Crown to monitor and regulate overseas trade and collect customs duties efficiently. It was part of a general Stapel system used in medieval trade.

At the designated towns, often referred to as staple towns or "Ports of the Staple", accredited merchants were required to submit their goods to inspection and were obliged to pay a levy such as the wool subsidy, to the Crown on goods for export to the continent of Europe. These merchants were later to become organised as Merchants of the Staple.

The English system remained in place for nearly two centuries, though it would decline in importance as exports of finished cloth were substituted for exports of raw wool. With the fall of Calais to the French, in 1558, the staple moved again to Bruges. From 1617, wool exports were stopped entirely, and only domestic staples would remain in England.

== Overseas Staple Port ==
Under the Staple, the designated port was often overseas. It was at Dordrecht in 1338, and at Bruges in 1343. For a time after 1353, staple ports were established in England, under the Statute of the Staple: thus various English localities named "Stapleton" or "Stapleford".

However, from 1363, Calais was designated the staple port for wool and leather exports. All wool sold overseas was taken first to Calais, then under English control. Under this system, Calais itself was called "the Staple". The trade was dominated by the Merchants of the Staple who, from 1363, had been granted the exclusive right to trade raw wool in Calais.

== Sources ==
- Jenckes, Adaline L (1908). The origin, the organisation and the location of The Staple of England. Philadelphia.
- Unwin, George (1918). "The estate of merchants, 1336-1365, IV - 1355-65". Finance and trade under Edward III. Manchester.
- Weever, John (1631). "Within the Diocese of Rochester: Deptford". Antient Funeral Monuments (1979 ed.). London.
