= Phil Roberto =

Canadian ice hockey player (1949–2025)

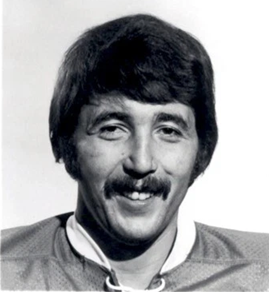
- Roberto in 1978 photo
- Born: January 1, 1949 Niagara Falls, Ontario, Canada
- Died: April 30, 2025 (aged 76) Niagara Falls, Ontario, Canada
- Height: 6 ft 1 in (185 cm)
- Weight: 190 lb (86 kg; 13 st 8 lb)
- Position: Right wing
- Shot: Right
- Played for: Montreal Canadiens; St. Louis Blues; Detroit Red Wings; Kansas City Scouts; Colorado Rockies; Cleveland Barons; Birmingham Bulls
- Playing career: 1969–1978

Phillip Joseph Roberto (January 1, 1949 – April 30, 2025) was a Canadian professional ice hockey forward. He played in the National Hockey League (NHL) for the Montreal Canadiens, St. Louis Blues, Detroit Red Wings, Kansas City Scouts, Colorado Rockies, and Cleveland Barons between 1969 and 1978. He also played in the World Hockey Association (WHA) for the Birmingham Bulls.

== NHL career ==
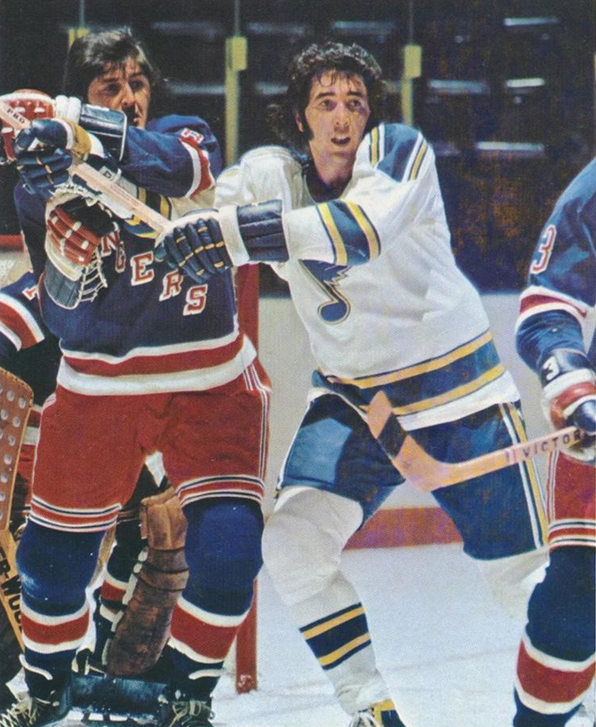
Roberto (right) in action for St. Louis Blues against Steve Vickers (left) in 1971

Roberto won the Stanley Cup with Montreal in 1971. That same year, Roberto assisted Canadiens legend Jean Béliveau's landmark 500th goal.

In 385 NHL games, Roberto recorded 75 goals and 106 assists for a total of 181 points.

Roberto's 1973-74 hockey card depicts him fighting with New York Islanders goalie Billy Smith, marking the first time a player was shown in a fight on a card.

== Coaching career ==
Roberto coached the ECHL's Birmingham Bulls from 1993-96. He then served as general manager of the CHL/ECHL's Columbus (Ga.) Cottonmouths for several seasons before coaching the team for the latter half of the 2002-03 season.

== Death ==
Roberto died on April 30, 2025, at the age of 76.

== Career statistics ==
=== Regular season and playoffs ===
			Regular season					Playoffs
Season	Team	League	GP	G	A	Pts	PIM	GP	G	A	Pts	PIM
1965–66	Niagara Falls Flyers	OHA	2	2	0	2	0	6	1	1	2	6
1965–66	Niagara Falls Canucks	OHA-B	—	—	—	—	—	—	—	—	—	—
1966–67	Niagara Falls Flyers	OHA	14	1	0	1	6	—	—	—	—	—
1966–67	Niagara Falls Canucks	OHA-B	—	—	—	—	—	—	—	—	—	—
1967–68	Niagara Falls Flyers	OHA	53	19	20	39	92	19	13	14	27	71
1968–69	Niagara Falls Flyers	OHA	52	29	65	94	152	14	7	15	22	38
1969–70	Montreal Canadiens	NHL	8	0	1	1	8	—	—	—	—	—
1969–70	Montreal Voyageurs	AHL	54	20	19	39	160	8	3	1	4	19
1970–71	Montreal Canadiens	NHL	39	14	7	21	76	15	0	1	1	36
1970–71	Montreal Voyageurs	AHL	32	19	22	41	127	—	—	—	—	—
1971–72	Montreal Canadiens	NHL	27	3	2	5	22	—	—	—	—	—
1971–72	St. Louis Blues	NHL	49	12	13	25	76	11	7	6	13	29
1972–73	St. Louis Blues	NHL	77	20	22	42	99	5	2	1	3	4
1973–74	St. Louis Blues	NHL	15	1	1	2	10	—	—	—	—	—
1973–74	Denver Spurs	WHL	8	5	4	9	40	—	—	—	—	—
1974–75	St. Louis Blues	NHL	7	0	2	2	2	—	—	—	—	—
1974–75	Denver Spurs	CHL	8	3	2	5	12	—	—	—	—	—
1974–75	Detroit Red Wings	NHL	46	13	27	40	30	—	—	—	—	—
1975–76	Detroit Red Wings	NHL	37	1	7	8	68	—	—	—	—	—
1975–76	Kansas City Scouts	NHL	37	7	15	22	42	—	—	—	—	—
1976–77	Colorado Rockies	NHL	22	1	5	6	23	—	—	—	—	—
1976–77	Cleveland Barons	NHL	21	3	4	7	8	—	—	—	—	—
1977–78	Birmingham Bulls	WHA	53	8	20	28	91	4	1	0	1	20
WHA totals			53	8	20	28	91	4	1	0	1	20
NHL totals			385	75	106	181	464	31	9	8	17	69
