= Stapleton, Cumbria =

Village and civil parish in Cumbria, England

Coordinates: 55.0337°N 2.7785°W

Stapleton
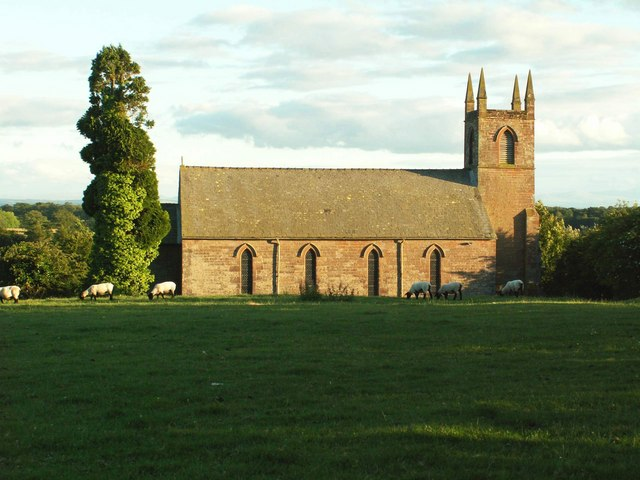
- St. Mary's Church, Stapleton

- Location within Cumbria
- Population: 236 (2021)
- OS grid reference: NY5033971295
- Civil parish: Stapleton
- Unitary authority: Cumberland
- Ceremonial county: Cumbria
- Region: North West
- Country: England
- Sovereign state: United Kingdom
- Post town: CARLISLE
- Postcode district: CA6
- Dialling code: 016977
- Police: Cumbria
- Fire: Cumbria
- Ambulance: North West
- UK Parliament: Carlisle

Stapleton is a village and civil parish in the Cumberland district, in the ceremonial county of Cumbria, England. In the 2021 census the parish had a population of 236.

== Location ==
Stapleton is located around 8 miles away from Longtown and around 12 miles away from Carlisle. Stapleton is located just east of the B6318, its nearest main road, and around 12 miles away from the M6 motorway, one of the major motorways in the United Kingdom. The nearest railway stations are Brampton (Cumbria) railway station which is around 7 miles away and is operated by Northern and is on the Newcastle and Carlisle Railway.

== Population ==
According to the 2001 UK Census there are 87 households in the parish of Stapleton, with a population of 221 people. This makes it an extremely small parish. In 1991, the population of Stapleton was 230 people. This means the population has decreased around 4.5% in the past 10 years. This is slower than the population decrease in England as a whole, which is thought to be around 8% every 10 years. However the overall decrease in the English population is the underlying reason for a reduction in small parish's populations. In 1851 UK Census the population of Stapleton was recorded as 1119 people, this is the highest recorded population of the parish, and in the next UK census, in 1881 the parish's population had dropped significantly, to 372 people. The population taken at the 2011 Census was 249.

== Attractions ==
The South Tynedale Railway stop Kirkhaugh Station is located 18 miles from Stapleton. The South Tynedale Railway is a heritage railway that runs from Alston in Cumbria to Lintley in Northumberland. The railway line is renowned for its location, as it is England's highest narrow gauge railway line. The South Tyndale Railway attracts an estimated 40,000 tourists a year, making it one of Cumbria's main tourist attractions.

St. Mary's Church is the parish church. It is located in the centre of the township and was erected in 1830 on the site of a church thought to be dating back to the 12th century. The Lanercost Priory is around 6 miles away from Stapleton. The original priory was built in 1169, as a monastery but was destroyed in 1536 by Henry VIII in a period of mass dissolution of monasteries. It is believed that Anglican services have been held in the Priory every Sunday for the past 850 years, making it one of the long-standing Anglican churches. It is an English National Heritage Site.

== See also ==
- Listed buildings in Stapleton, Cumbria
- Staple towns
