= 1434 oath =

Oath taken by members of the English gentry

- Location: England
- Motive: Reduce lawlessness
- Target: Major landholders
- Organised by: Royal council
- Participants: > 4,000

The 1434 oath was taken by members of the English gentry and swore them to refrain from harbouring law-breakers and other breakers of the King's Peace.

== The oath ==
In 1434 the King, Henry VI, was still a legal minor, and the royal council ruled on his behalf. (Note: Henry was six-months' old on his father's death in 1422, and did not begin his personal rule until 1437.) Aware of the important role the gentry and nobility played in the regions in keeping law and order, the council believed that it would be a positive step for these men to swear an oath "that they would neither use their wealth and influence to undertake criminal activities nor maintain lesser men" who did. The nobility had already taken a similar oath in the House of Lords the previous year at the instigation of the Commons, which also took the oath on the same day. (Note: The oath was agreed on 3 November 1433, but the physical process of taking it lasted until 5 December. Fourteen bishops, fourteen abbots and priors and thirty-one lay peers were in attendance.) It was then decided that all major landholders in the country should also swear the same.

The oath instructed that all who took it would not:

Receyve, cheryssh, hold in houshold ne maigtene pillours, robbours, oppressours of the peple, mansleers, felons, owtlawes, ravissheres of wommen, brekers of parkes or warennes, or eny other open mysdoor or eny openly named or famed for such till his innocencie be declared, and that no man take eny other mennes cause or querell in favour or meyntenaunce as be word, by writyng or message to officer, juge, jure or partie be colour of eny feffement.

— Ordinances for John Mowbray, Duke of Norfolk, c. 1435

On 20 January the parliament's Knights of the Shire were instructed to compose and submit to Chancery a list of those property holders who qualified in their constituencies. The oath itself was taken in the localities on 1 May the same year. Of the 36 counties of which lists were presumably made, 29 survive in Chancery. They comprise over 4,000 names, generally listed from the highest-ranking to the lowest. Ten men appear on multiple lists. Bogner has called this collection a "15th-century Who's Who...a rare snapshot of the movers and shakers in local society".

The oath of 1434 has been described by the prosopographer Gilbert Bogner as constituting "the most comprehensive list of English knights" of the century. (Note: Most of the records—enrolled in Chancery—are still extant, and are held at The National Archives in Kew, classified as C 66/436/15–29. They have been published in the Calendar of Patent Rolls, 1429–1436, pp. 370–414.) The oath was a response to a perceived increase in lawlessness in the regions, which itself was seen as having been caused by illegal retaining.

=== Later events ===
The 1434 oath was used the following year to encourage John Mowbray, Duke of Norfolk to improve his behaviour. Although Mowbray had sworn with the other lords in 1433, his behaviour, which seems to have been riotous, had continued in the same manner. Mowbray was instructed to "have bysilie in his mynde and for kepyng of his honour observe in all poyntes tharticle assured as wele by hym as other lordes and estates of this land in the kynges hande at the last parlement holden at Westm'".

== Historiography ==
The oath's significance to historians, argues Bogner, was that it lists the gentry whom the crown considered "capable of retaining men as a force for their own ends", and who were trained in war. Similarly, the medievalist Ralph A. Griffiths suggests that those who took the oath were "socially prominent or politically powerful" men, while Edward Powell considers that those who signed can be considered gentry by the historian, regardless of the signatory's actual employment. The fact that the oath was deemed necessary indicates the extent to which law and order was considered to have collapsed in the regions.

Christian Liddy, in a study of the oath-taking in the Palatinate of Durham suggests that the oath was not confined to the gentry class. In that region at least, he says, there was a "preponderance of low-income and sub-manorial esquires" also taking part. Christine Carpenter had similar results in her examination of Warwickshire society, discovering that wealth was not a critical factor in deciding who took the oath. For example, Sir Thomas Ferrers appears in the tax return of 1436–indicating he was considered wealthy enough to be taxed (Note: In the middle ages, tax in the form of a fifteenth and tenth on moveable property was frequent, but Income tax was rare and that issued in 1436 was one of the first. Fifteenths and tenths generally fell upon everyone, and especially the poor. The income tax, however, fell only on those who possessed—and the act put it—"Maners, Londes, Tenementz, Rentis, Annuitees, Offices or any othir Possessions temporell [held] as of Frehold in Ingeland". The starting band was an income of between £5 and £100 per annum.)—but he was not summoned to take the oath takers two years previously. The social class of oath-taker appears to have varied from county to county. Figures available from the Kentish oath-taking, for instance, indicate that around a third of those who swore the oath in Kent were yeomen rather than gentry. (Note: The researcher Ken Wise has noted that generally throughout this period, yeomen were much less likely than their social superiors to appear in contemporary documents, mainly because the latter could more easily afford the costs of litigation.) The numbers of men called upon also varied wildly between areas; those from Kent numbered over 300, for example, while Lancashire swore less than 80.

For some individuals of the period events such as the 1434 oath are the only occasion on which they appear on the historical record. Bogner highlights, for example, Sir John Colepepir of Warwickshire, who, Bogner writes, apart from his being knighted, has "yet left virtually no impression on the records aside from also swearing the 1434 oath and dying in 1482".
