= John Stapleton =

John Stapleton may refer to:

- John Stapleton (Australian journalist) (born 1952), Australian journalist
- John Stapleton (English journalist) (1946–2025), English journalist and broadcaster
- John Stapleton (MP) (1816–1891), English Liberal Party politician who sat in the House of Commons between 1852 and 1874
- John Stapleton (fl.1406), MP for Midhurst (UK Parliament constituency)
- John Stapleton (fl.1421), MP for Shropshire (UK Parliament constituency)
- John Stapleton (playwright), collaborator in the adaptation of A Gentleman of Leisure
