= Stapleton =

Stapleton may refer to:

== Places ==
=== Australia ===
- Stapleton Island, Queensland
- Stapleton, Northern Territory

=== United Kingdom ===
- Stapleton, Bristol
- Stapleton, Cumbria
- Stapleton, Herefordshire
- Stapleton, Leicestershire
- Stapleton-on-Tees, North Yorkshire
- Stapleton, Selby, North Yorkshire
- Stapleton, Shropshire
- Stapleton, Somerset, a location

=== United States ===
- Stapleton, Alabama
- Stapleton, Georgia
- Stapleton, Nebraska
- Stapleton, Staten Island, a neighborhood in New York City
  - Stapleton (Staten Island Railway station)
- Central Park, Denver, a neighborhood in Denver, Colorado; formerly known as Stapleton
- Stapleton International Airport, the former airport serving Denver, Colorado, now being redeveloped as a master-planned New Urbanist community

== Other uses ==
- Stapleton (surname), including a list of people and characters with the name
- Stapleton (band), a rock band from Glasgow
