= Robert Sandford (died 1459/1460) =

15th-century English politician

Robert Sandford (died 1459/60), of Askham, Westmorland, was a Member of Parliament for Appleby in May 1413. He was an important figure in Cumberland gentry society, and was related by marriage to the sheriff, Thomas de la More, a servant of Richard Neville, 5th Earl of Salisbury.
