= Listed buildings in Stapleton, Cumbria =

Stapleton is a civil parish in the Cumberland district of Cumbria, England. It contains seven listed buildings that are recorded in the National Heritage List for England. All the listed buildings are designated at Grade II, the lowest of the three grades, which is applied to "buildings of national importance and special interest". The parish is almost entirely rural, and the listed buildings, apart from a church, are all farmhouses, farm buildings, and associated structures.

== Buildings ==
| Name and location | Photograph | Date | Notes |
|---|---|---|---|
| Cumcrook and barn 55.06690°N 2.77967°W | — | 1685 | The farmhouse and barn are in sandstone, and there were alterations in 1734. The house has plinth stones, quoins, and a roof of local slate. There are two storeys and four bays. The doorway has a quoined surround and a dated and inscribed lintel. Some original windows remain, including a fire window, the others have been replaced by sash windows with chamfered surrounds. The barn to the left has a Welsh slate roof, plank doors, casement windows, and external steps leading to a loft door. |
| Greenhill and barn 55.02188°N 2.73651°W | — | Mid 18th century | The farmhouse, which was extended to the rear in the 19th century, and the barn have a slate roof. The house is rendered with two storeys, three bays, and a doorway with a plain surround. The windows are casements with chamfered mullions and surrounds. The barn to the left is in brick and has ventilation slits on two levels. |
| Soutermoor; 55.03187°N 2.80242°W | — | Mid 18th century | Originally a farmhouse, later a private house, it is in sandstone with a Welsh slate roof. There are two storeys and four bays. The doorway has a quoined surround, a round keyed arch, and a fanlight. Most of the windows are sashes in plain surrounds, and some have been replaced by 20th-century casements. |
| Shankbridge End and barn 55.02234°N 2.83009°W | — | Late 18th century | The farmhouse and barn are in sandstone, and were altered in 1836. The house has quoins and a green slate roof, two storeys and two bays. On the front is a stone porch, and the doorway has a dated and inscribed lintel. The windows are sashes with plain surrounds. The barn to the left has an L-shaped plan and a roof partly in corrugated asbestos. It contains a large projecting cart entrance, plank doors, windows, and ventilation slits. |
| Barn, Soutermoor; 55.03183°N 2.80287°W | — | 1799 | The barn is in sandstone with a green slate roof, and it has a single storey. It contains a large cart entrance with a quoined surround and a round keyed arch, a plank door with a dated and initialled lintel, and ventilation slits. Inside there are four upper crucks in the loft. |
| Garden wall, Soutermoor; 55.03165°N 2.80261°W | — | Early 19th century (probable) | It is a high wall attached to the southwest corner of the house. The wall is in sandstone with flat coping. It ramps down to the garden entrance, which is flanked by square gate piers with pyramidal caps. |
| St Mary's Church; 55.03369°N 2.77855°W | | 1829–31 | The church replaced a medieval church on the same site and re-used some of its materials. It is built in sandstone on a chamfered plinth with quoins and a slate roof. The church consists of a nave, a narrow chancel, and a west tower incorporating a porch. The tower has a doorway with a pointed chamfered arch, stepped angle buttresses, and corner pinnacles. The windows are lancets with hood moulds, and the east window is a triple lancet. |
