= Truces between England and Scotland, 1309–1485 =

| Date | Location | Principal negotiators/signatories | | Cause | Terms | Intended duration | Expiry date | Notes |
|---|---|---|---|---|---|---|---|---|
| | | English | Scottish | | | | | |
| 3 January 1323 | Lochmaben | * Andrew Harclay, Earl of Carlisle | * Robert the Bruce | Harclay disapproved of the king's lethargy in prosecuting the war against Robert the Bruce and failures such as the Battle of Old Byland when he tried. | Recognised Scotland as an independent kingdom. Bruce would pay 40,000 marks (Note: A medieval English mark was a unit of currency equivalent to two-thirds of a pound.) to the English, and the two royal families would codify their alliance by intermarriage. The treaty suggests that Bruce and Harcaly would forcibly make Edward respect the treaty if necessary. | | | Harclay is executed by King Edward II for treason on 3 March, due to signing a treaty without authority. |
| 30 May 1323 | Thirteen years | | | | | | 1326 | Repeated failures by Edward II of England to prosecute those who broke the peace led to Bruce renewing the Auls Alliance. The English army was subsequently crushed in the Weardale campaign the following year. |
| 17 March 1328 | Holyrood Abbey, Edinburgh | Queen Isabella; Roger Mortimer, Earl of March; Henry Burghersh, Bishop of Lincoln | *Robert the Bruce: Robert III; William de Lamberton, Bishop of St Andrews | Following Bruce's successful Wear campaign and the devastation this wrought to the North of England, King Edward had been deposed, and Isabelle and Mortimer knew they would not be able to prevent another major Scottish incursion into England. | Full recognition by the English crown of Scottish independence, and Bruce as king. Payment of £20,000 by the Scots to the English to keep the peace. The Anglo-Scottish border to return to the extent it had been in the reign of Alexander III (1249–1286). Bruce's sonDavid to marry Edward's daughter Joan. | | | Main article: Treaty of Edinburgh–Northampton Ratified by English parliament on 1 May 1428. |
| 1407 | | King Henry IV; (Commissioners Thomas More of Cumcatch, Cumberland) | Archibald, Earl of Douglas | The Scottish king, James I, was a captive of King Henry, so Scotland was governed by the regent, Robert, Duke of Albany. Douglas was also a prisoner, but his family controlled much of southern Scotland. When he felt this position was threatened, he concluded a truce with Henry. | Douglas indentures that he would serve only Henry: "before all men and against all men", and although he excepted King James, he explicitly and pointedly did not excuse Albany. Douglas received his freedom in return. | Douglas's lifetime | | Two years later, Douglas and Albany agreed a peace. Douglas gained the remainder of southern Scotland not already under his control. England's Scottish policy in tatters. |
| 19 January 1431 | | | | The ongoing war with France was absorbing the majority of England's financial and military resources, which necessitated a peaceful northern border. | A partial truce on land, a general truce on the sea. (Note: Part of a series of near-monthly truces brokered in the early 1430s between the wardens of both marches in both countries.) | | | |
| 1434 | | | | | | | | Monitored by Sir Robert Ogle, royal commissioner. |
| 1 June 1464 | York | George Neville, Bishop of Exeter and chancellor; Richard Neville, Earl of Warwick; John Neville, Lord Montagu | Andrew, Bishop of Glasgow; Archibald, Abbot of Holyrood; The Provost of Lincluden; Colin, Earl of Argyll; William, Lord Borthwick; Robert, 1st Lord Boyd | The Scottish government under Mary of Guelders and Bishop Kennedy of St Andrews were originally pro-Lancastrian during the Englaish Wars of the Roses, but rebellious factions within their own nobility, combined with friendly overtures from the new Yorkist king, Edward IV. Combined with a lack of military support from their erstwhile allies, the French, (Note: To the extent that the Scottish parliament was uncertain whether the French would even send them an expected embassy.) the final destruction of Lancastrian resistance at the Battle of Hexham and the possibility of an English invasion, | Meeting for redress of breaches of the truce to be held at Lochmaben Stone on 23 July for the West Marches and at Riddenburn on the East. Bishop Kennedy and Thomas Spens, Bishop of Aberdeen received pensions. Matrimonial ties to be discussed. | 15 years | | Main article: Treaty of York (1464) Ratified by Edward IV two days after signing. |
