= Fifteenth and tenth =

Medieval English parliamentary tax

Fifteenth and tenth was a form of parliamentary taxation in medieval and early modern England, most commonly levied from the late 13th century until the 17th century. Originally conceived as a fractional tax on movable property, it later became a fixed-sum tax assessed by locality rather than by individual wealth.
