= Thomas Stapleton (antiquary) =

English landowner & antiquary (1805–1849)

Thomas Stapleton (1805–1849) was an English landowner and antiquary.

== Life ==
Stapleton was the second son of Thomas Stapleton of Carlton Hall, Yorkshire, by his first wife, Maria Juliana, daughter of Sir Robert Gerard, 9th Baronet. On the death of his father in 1839, he succeeded to landed property near Richmond, Yorkshire.

Stapleton was elected a fellow of the Society of Antiquaries of London on 15 January 1839, and, as a close friend of John Gage Rokewode, its director, became involved with the Society. He was appointed one of its vice-presidents in 1846.

Stapleton died at Cromwell Cottage, Old Brompton, on 4 December 1849.

== Works ==
Stapleton's major work was the prefatory exposition of the rolls of the Norman exchequer, printed at the expense of the Society of Antiquaries as Magni Rotuli Scaccarii Normanniæ sub Regibus Angliæ,’ 2 vols. 1841–4. He also contributed to Archæologia. At the meeting of the Archæological Institute at York in 1846, he read a long memoir of 230 pages.

Stapleton was also one of the founders of the Camden Society and edited one of its first publications, The Plumpton Correspondence (1839), a collection of 15th-century letters. He also edited for the society the chronicle of London, extending from 1178 to 1274 De Antiquis Legibus Liber (1846). His last work for the Camden Society was the edition of the Chronicon Petroburgense (1849). His Historical Memoirs of the House of Vernon (pp. 115), an incomplete work, was privately printed in London around 1855.
