= Dave Stapleton =

Dave Stapleton may refer to:

- David Stapleton (general) (1937–2016), chief of staff of the Irish Defence Forces 1998–2000
- Dave Stapleton (infielder) (born 1954), baseball player who played with the Boston Red Sox 1980–86
- Dave Stapleton (pitcher) (born 1961), baseball player who played with the Milwaukee Brewers 1987–88
- Dave Stapleton (born 1979), pianist, composer and founder of Edition Records
