= Laurence Stapleton =

English footballer

Personal information
- Full name: Laurence Stapleton
- Date of birth: 19 May 1893
- Place of birth: Nottingham, England
- Date of death: 1969 (aged 75–76)
- Position: Winger

Senior career*
Years	Team	Apps	(Gls)
1913–1914	Wallsend		
1914–1915	Basford United		
1919–1921	Nottingham Forest	11	(0)
1921	Heanor Town		
1922	Shirebrook		
Total		11	(0)
- * Club domestic league appearances and goals

Laurence Stapleton (19 May 1893 – 1969) was an English footballer who played in the Football League for Nottingham Forest.
