= Rick Foley =

Canadian ice hockey defenceman

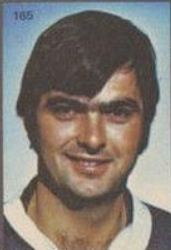
- Foley in 1972 sticker
- Born: September 22, 1945 Niagara Falls, Ontario, Canada
- Died: September 29, 2015 (aged 70) Burlington, Ontario, Canada
- Height: 6 ft 4 in (193 cm)
- Weight: 223 lb (101 kg; 15 st 13 lb)
- Position: Defence
- Shot: Left
- Played for: Chicago Black Hawks; Philadelphia Flyers; Detroit Red Wings; Toronto Toros
- Playing career: 1966–1978

Gilbert Anthony "Rick" Foley (September 22, 1945 – September 29, 2015) was a Canadian professional ice hockey defenceman. He played 67 games in the National Hockey League with the Chicago Black Hawks, Philadelphia Flyers, and Detroit Red Wings between 1971 and 1973 and 11 games in the World Hockey Association with the Toronto Toros in 1975 and 1976. The rest of his career, which lasted from 1966 to 1978, was spent in the minor leagues.

== Playing career ==
During the game of December 15, 1971, Foley simultaneously fought both Jim Neilson and Glen Sather. The fight lasted about 30 seconds and was one of the rare times one player fought two. Foley was given a decision against both by those who witnessed the event. The two Ranger players received fighting majors while Foley only received one. Foley also received a game misconduct from referee Ron Wicks for reasons that remain unclear. He died on September 29, 2015.

== Career statistics ==
=== Regular season and playoffs ===
			Regular season					Playoffs
Season	Team	League	GP	G	A	Pts	PIM	GP	G	A	Pts	PIM
1962–63	Toronto Marlboros	MetJAHL	30	6	24	30	64	9	3	5	8	23
1963–64	Toronto Marlboros	OHA	8	0	0	0	17	—	—	—	—	—
1963–64	Oshawa Generals	OHA	8	0	3	3	42	—	—	—	—	—
1964–65	St. Thomas Barons	WOJBHL	—	—	—	—	—	—	—	—	—	—
1965–66	St. Thomas Barons	WOJBHL	36	25	39	64	222	—	—	—	—	—
1966–67	Jersey Devils	EHL	—	—	—	—	—	—	—	—	—	—
1966–67	Charlotte Checkers	EHL	68	5	42	47	222	8	1	4	5	29
1967–68	Charlotte Checkers	EHL	71	17	80	97	192	14	5	7	12	69
1968–69	Dallas Black Hawks	CHL	2	0	0	0	4	—	—	—	—	—
1968–69	Portland Buckaroos	WHL	5	0	0	0	10	—	—	—	—	—
1968–69	Charlotte Checkers	EHL	66	22	58	80	216	3	2	0	2	6
1969–70	Portland Buckaroos	WHL	71	7	38	45	227	8	0	4	4	65
1970–71	Portland Buckaroos	WHL	66	17	54	71	306	9	2	9	11	44
1970–71	Chicago Black Hawks	NHL	2	0	1	1	8	4	0	1	1	4
1971–72	Philadelphia Flyers	NHL	58	11	25	36	168	—	—	—	—	—
1972–73	Richmond Robins	AHL	26	6	15	21	69	—	—	—	—	—
1972–73	San Diego Gulls	WHL	31	5	14	19	110	6	2	6	8	32
1973–74	Baltimore Clippers	AHL	65	14	56	70	164	9	2	6	8	28
1973–74	Detroit Red Wings	NHL	7	0	0	0	4	—	—	—	—	—
1974–75	Syracuse Eagles	AHL	69	13	40	53	306	1	0	2	2	0
1975–76	Baltimore Clippers	AHL	4	2	2	4	14	—	—	—	—	—
1975–76	Toronto Toros	WHA	11	1	2	3	6	—	—	—	—	—
1976–77	Brantford Alexanders	OHA Sr	17	2	14	16	76	—	—	—	—	—
1977–78	Brantford Alexanders	OHA Sr	6	1	3	4	20	—	—	—	—	—
WHA totals			11	1	2	3	6	—	—	—	—	—
NHL totals			67	11	26	37	180	4	0	1	1	4
