= Camden Society =

Text publication society in London

The Camden Society was a text publication society founded in London in 1838 to publish early historical and literary materials, both unpublished manuscripts and new editions of rare printed books. It was named after the 16th-century antiquary and historian William Camden. In 1897 it merged with the Royal Historical Society, which continues to publish texts in what are now known as the Camden Series.

== History ==
The formation of the Camden Society in 1838 was the initiative of Thomas Wright, John Gough Nichols, and John Bruce. It was modelled on the Surtees Society (founded in 1834 to publish materials relating to the history of northern England), of which Nichols had been the first treasurer. Other founder members included Thomas Amyot, Thomas Crofton Croker, Sir Frederic Madden, John Payne Collier, and Rev. Joseph Hunter. Lord Francis Egerton served as the first President.

For an annual subscription (originally £1 per year), members received the Society's publications, roughly two volumes per year. The original membership was 500. In 1838, 20% of members were clergymen, 9% held legal qualifications, and 36% were Fellows of the Society of Antiquaries of London. Membership reached a peak of 1250 in 1845, and began to decline thereafter. By the 1880s, the Camden Society was experiencing financial problems, brought about in part by a project to create a general index to its first 100 volumes. On 2 May 1897 it was amalgamated with (or effectively absorbed into) the Royal Historical Society.

The Society published some works jointly with the Early English Text Society.

== Publications ==
Between 1838 and 1872 the Society published 105 volumes in its first series (now sometimes known as the Old Series); followed by a further 56 volumes in its second series (known as the New Series), which appeared between 1871 and 1896. Following the merger with the Royal Historical Society, the joint society issued another 6 volumes in the New Series, of which the last, volume 62, appeared in 1901. A fresh series was then begun, published under the Royal Historical Society imprint, but named the Camden Third Series, in which 94 volumes appeared between 1900 and 1963. A further 44 volumes were published between 1969 and 1993 in the Camden Fourth Series; and the Camden Fifth Series, which began publication in 1993, had reached volume 67 by 2024, and remains in progress. The majority of volumes have contained book-length texts (occasionally running into multiple volumes), or thematic groups of shorter texts; but they have also from time to time – both in the two original Camden Society series and in the three RHS Camden Series – been made up of two or more disparate shorter texts, under the series title Camden Miscellany. A total of 36 Miscellany volumes had appeared by 2015.

Volumes are now published for the RHS by Cambridge University Press.

== Bibliography ==
- Johnson, Charles (1940). "The Camden Society, 1838–1938". Transactions of the Royal Historical Society. 22: 23–38. doi:10.2307/3678580. JSTOR 3678580. S2CID 162416678.
- Levine, Philippa (1986). The Amateur and the Professional: antiquarians, historians and archaeologists in Victorian England, 1838–1886. Cambridge: Cambridge University Press. ISBN 0-521-30635-3.
- Levy, F. J. (1964). "The Founding of the Camden Society". Victorian Studies. 7: 295–305.
- Taylor Milne, Alexander (1968). A Centenary Guide to the Publications of the Royal Historical Society 1868–1968, and of the former Camden Society 1838–1897. Royal Historical Society Guides and Handbooks. Vol. 9. London: Royal Historical Society.
