= John Stapleton (Australian journalist) =

Australian journalist

John Stapleton (born 21 June 1952) is an Australian journalist.

The first money he ever made out of writing was in 1974 when he was co-winner of a short story competition held by what was then Australia's leading cultural celebration, the Adelaide Arts Festival.

He graduated from Macquarie University in 1975 with a double major in philosophy and did post-graduate work with the Sociology Department at Flinders University.

As a freelance journalist in the 1970s and 1980s, while alternating between living in Sydney and London, his articles and fiction appeared in a wide range of magazines, newspapers and anthologies, including The Australian Financial Review.

John Stapleton worked on The Sydney Morning Herald as a staff news reporter between 1986 and 1994. The paper was then listed as one of the Top 20 newspapers in the world.

He worked for the national newspaper The Australian from 1994 to 2009.

His books include: Thailand: Deadly Destination, Terror in Australia: Workers' Paradise Lost, Hideout in the Apocalypse and the soon to be re-released Hunting the Famous. His new book Unfolding Catastrophe: Australia will be available in August 2021.

As a news reporter, Stapleton encountered and wrote many hundreds of stories about everyone from street alcoholics to Australian prime ministers; from the staple flood, drought, fire and natural disasters of the Australian bush to scenes of urban dysfunction.

In 2000 he became co-founder of the world's longest-running radio program on father's issues, Dads on the Air.

After leaving The Australian, Stapleton established A Sense of Place Magazine and the niche publishing company A Sense of Place Publishing.
