= Tom Stapleton (hurler) =

Irish hurler

Tom Stapleton was an Irish sportsperson in the 1880s. A native of Littleton, County Tipperary, he played hurling with his local Thurles Blues club and was a member of the Tipperary senior inter-county team that won the very first All-Ireland title in 1887.
