= Patrick Stapleton =

Patrick Stapleton may refer to:

- Patrick J. Stapleton Jr. (1924–2001), American politician in Pennsylvania
- Pat Stapleton (ice hockey) (1940–2020), Canadian ice hockey player
- Paddy Stapleton (born 1985), Irish hurler
