= Tom Stapleton (footballer) =

Australian rules footballer

Personal information
- Full name: Tom Stapleton
- Born: 17 July 1907
- Died: 18 October 1977 (aged 70)
- Original team: Chilwell

Playing career^{1}
Years	Club	Games (Goals)
1933, 1935	Geelong	6 (0)
- ^{1} Playing statistics correct to the end of 1935.

Tom Stapleton (17 July 1907 – 18 October 1977) was an Australian rules footballer who played with Geelong in the Victorian Football League (VFL).
