= William Stapleton (d. 1457) =

15th-century English regional leader

William Stapleton (c. 1390 – 1457) was a member of the English gentry who held several official offices in his native county of Cumberland. He was stylised as Lord of Edenhall. and a retainer of Richard Neville, Earl of Warwick. He died in October 1457; his Inquisition post mortem records that at this time there had been an incursion into the north of the county with much damage done. His eldest daughter Mary married William de Hilton.
