= Craig Stapleton (rugby league) =

Australian rugby league footballer

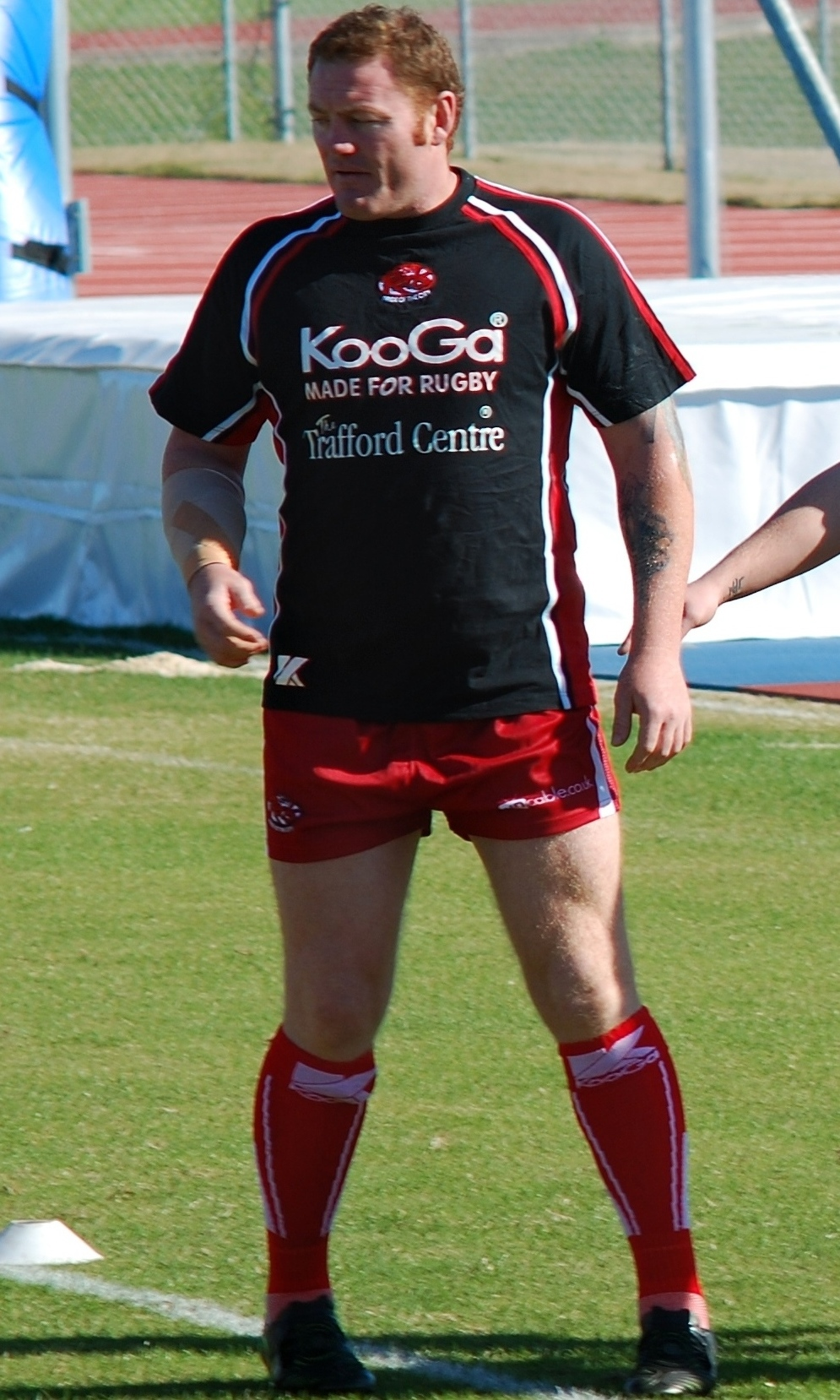

Personal information
- Full name: Craig Stapleton
- Born: 31 August 1978 (age 48) Sydney, New South Wales, Australia

Playing information
- Height: 6 ft 3 in (1.91 m)
- Weight: 110 kg (17 st 5 lb; 240 lb)
- Position: Prop
Club
Years	Team	Pld	T	G	FG	P
1998	St. George Dragons	6	1	0	0	4
2001–03	St George Illawarra	30	2	0	0	8
2004	Parramatta Eels	23	1	0	0	4
2005	Leigh Centurions	31	4	0	0	16
2006	Penrith Panthers	24	1	0	0	4
2007	Cronulla-Sutherland	24	0	0	0	0
2008–09	Salford City Reds	27	2	0	0	8
2010	South Sydney	3	0	0	0	0
	Total	168	11	0	0	44
Representative
Years	Team	Pld	T	G	FG	P
2006	Prime Minister's XIII	1	0	0	0	0

Craig Stapleton (born 31 August 1978) is an Australian former professional rugby league footballer who last played for the South Sydney Rabbitohs in the National Rugby League. Stapleton formerly played for St. George and St. George Illawarra, Parramatta Eels, Penrith Panthers and Cronulla-Sutherland Sharks in the Australian National Rugby League (NRL) competition as well as Leigh Centurions and Salford City Reds in Super League, primarily as a prop. A journeyman forward, Stapleton played for eight clubs in twelve years.

== Background ==
Stapleton was born in Sydney, New South Wales, Australia.

== Playing career ==
Stapleton made his first grade debut for St. George against the Gold Coast Chargers in round 11 of the 1998 NRL season which ended in a 30–16 victory. At the end of 1998, St. George formed a joint-venture with the Illawarra Steelers to form St. George Illawarra as part of the NRL's rationalization policy.

In 2001, Stapleton began playing for St. George Illawarra. In the 2002 NRL season, he played in the club's elimination final loss against rivals Cronulla-Sutherland. Stapleton joined Parramatta for the 2004 NRL season as the club finished a disappointing 12th on the table.

Stapleton spent a year in England with Leigh during the 2005 season. In 2006, he joined Penrith and played 24 games for the club as they missed out on the finals. He was later released by Penrith and joined Cronulla-Sutherland. He played 24 games for Cronulla as they finished 11th on the table.

In 2008, Stapleton joined English Super League club Salford.

== Return to Australia ==
Stapleton returned to Australia in 2009 to play in the Illawarra rugby league competition with Wests and was called up by South Sydney Rabbitohs in 2010 due to the number of injuries they had in the forwards. For the 2019 Group 7 Rugby League season, Stapleton was named head coach of the Warilla Gorillas.

== Career highlights ==
- First Grade Debut: 1998 – Round 11, St. George vs Gold Coast Chargers at Gold Coast Stadium, 23 May
- Salford's Player of the Year in 2008 & 2009
