= William Stapleton (d. 1544) =

16th-century English politician

William Stapleton (ca. 1495 – 1544), of Wighill, Yorkshire and London, was an English politician.

He was a member (MP) of the parliament of England for Carlisle in 1542.
