= St Cuthbert's Church, Kentmere =

St Cuthbert’s Church, Kentmere
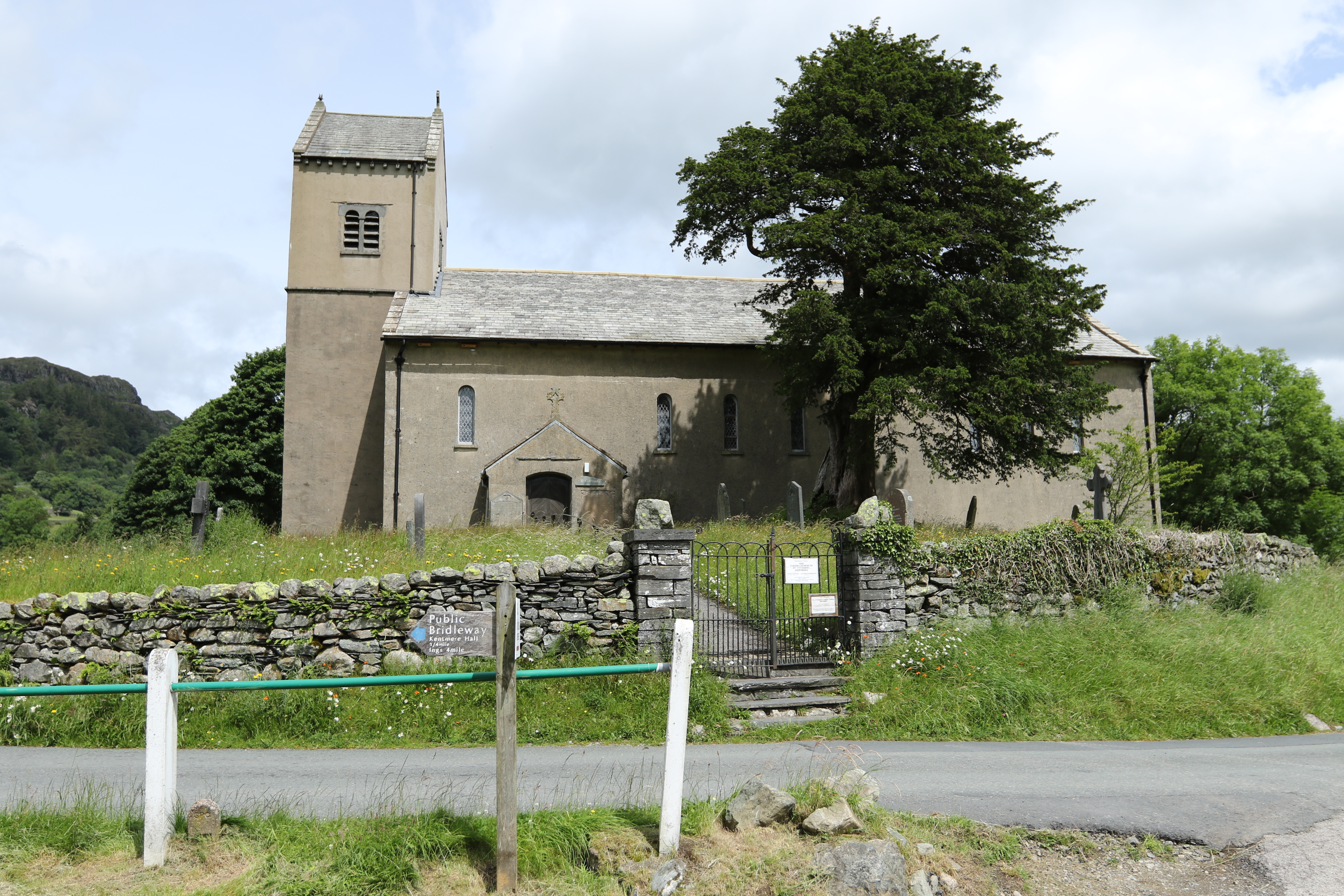
- St Cuthbert’s Church, Kentmere

- Location within Cumbria
- 54°25′44.98″N 2°50′22.89″W
- OS grid reference: NY 45631 04107
- Location: Kentmere
- Country: England
- Denomination: Church of England

History
- Dedication: St Cuthbert

Architecture
- Heritage designation: Grade II listed

Administration
- Diocese: Carlisle
- Archdeaconry: Westmoreland & Furness
- Deanery: Windermere
- Parish: Kentmere

Clergy
- Vicar: Revd James Richards

St Cuthbert's Church, Kentmere is a Grade II listed parish church in the Church of England in Kentmere, Cumbria. Its benefice is united with that of St Martin's Church, Bowness-on-Windermere; St Anne's Church, Ings; St James' Church, Staveley; Jesus Church, Troutbeck and St Mary's Church, Windermere.

== History ==
The church dates from the 16th century. It was surveyed by the architect, J. S. Crowther, of Manchester in 1864, who wrote a report to Vice-Admiral John Wilson of Troutbeck, concerning plans for the restoration. Crowther found that a wall had been built across the nave, reducing its length by one half. He suggested that this was removed. In addition he recommended re-slating the roof, adding cast iron gutters and downspouts, repairs to the woodwork of the doors and glazing of windows, installation of heating, re-fitting the chancel, a new wooden floor to support the seating, and the restoration of the tower.

It was rebuilt at a cost of £450 (equivalent to £46,300 in 2025), the tower was raised and the panelled square box pews were replaced by low backed open benches. It was re-opened for worship by the Bishop of Carlisle, Rt Revd Samuel Waldegrave on 22 November 1866.

Further alterations were made in the 1930s.

== Organ ==
The church organ was built by Wilkinson and Son of Kendal. A specification of the organ can be found on the National Pipe Organ Register.

== Memorials ==
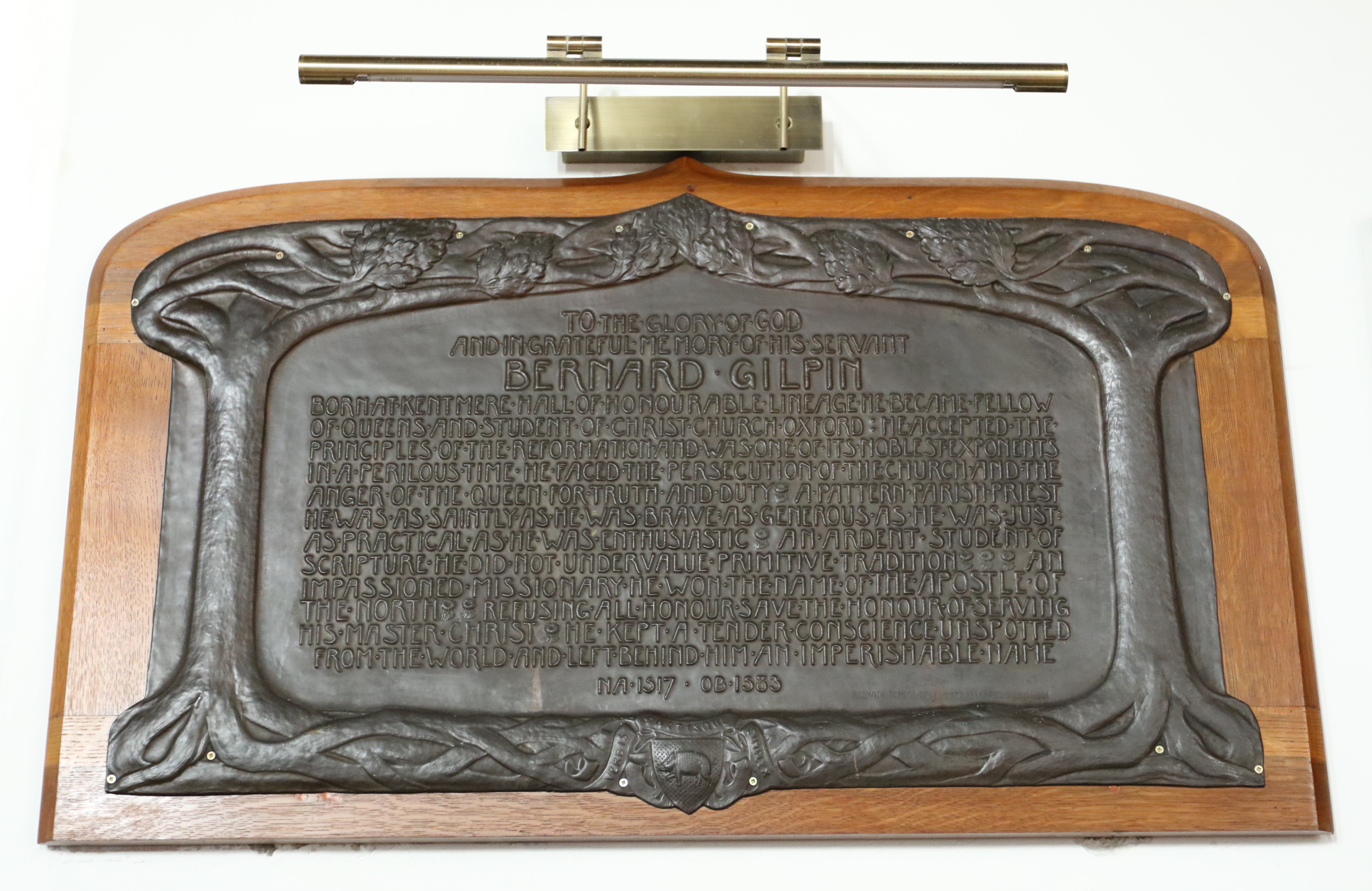
Memorial to Bernard Gilpin

- There is a plaque commemorating Bernard Gilpin (who was born in Kentmere) by the Keswick School of Industrial Art 1901
