= Jesus Church, Troutbeck =

Coordinates: 54.4172°N 2.9061°W

Jesus Church
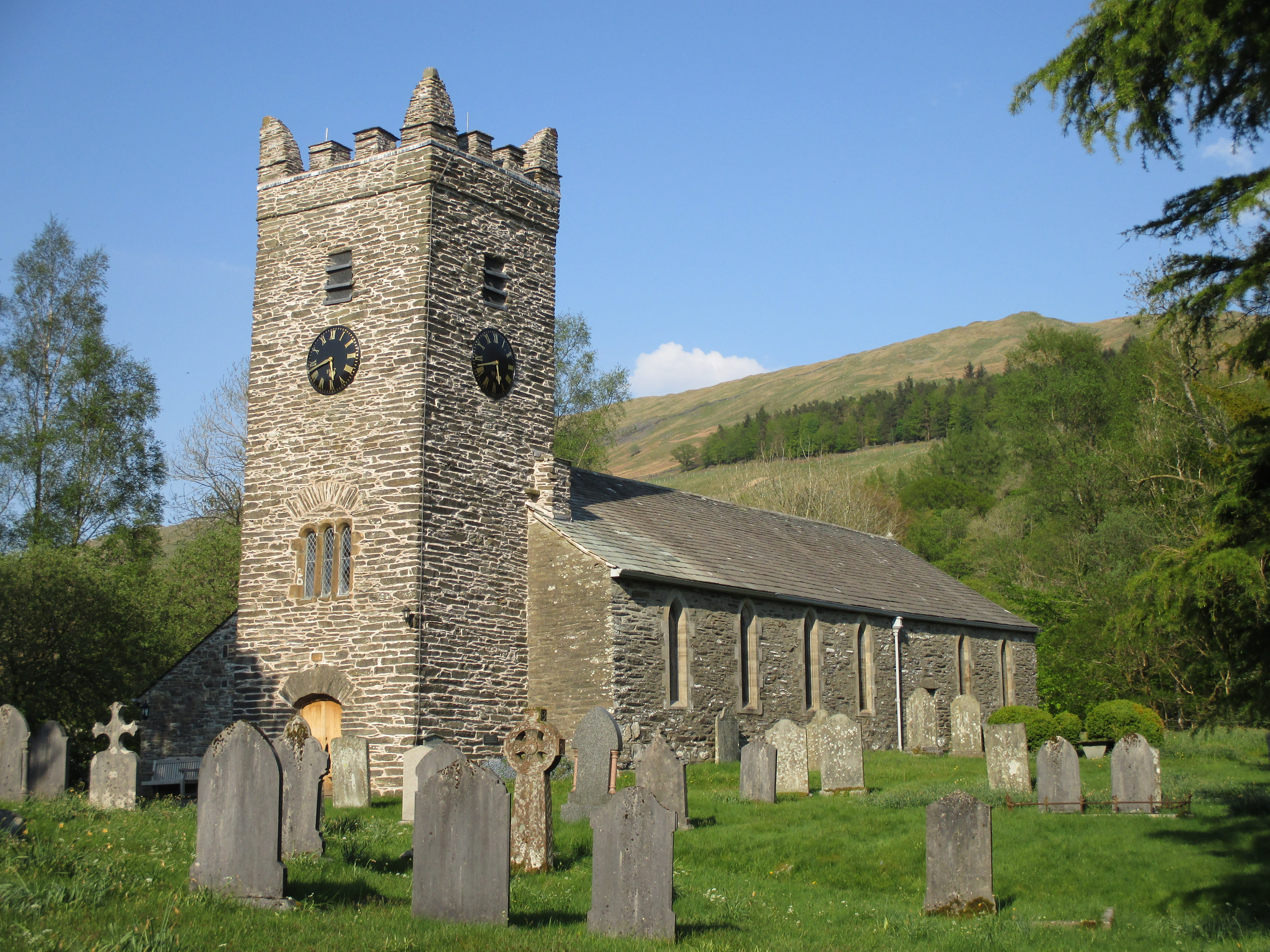
- Jesus Church from the southwest

- Location in South Lakeland Location in Cumbria
- OS grid reference: NY 413 028
- Location: Troutbeck, Cumbria
- Country: England
- Denomination: Anglican
- Website: Troutbeck Village Association - Jesus Church

History
- Status: Parish church

Architecture
- Functional status: Active
- Heritage designation: Grade II*
- Designated: 12 January 1967
- Architectural type: Church
- Style: Gothic

Specifications
- Materials: Slatestone, freestone dressings, slate roof

Administration
- Province: York
- Diocese: Carlisle
- Archdeaconry: Westmorland and Furness
- Deanery: Windermere
- Parish: Troutbeck

Clergy
- Vicar: Revd Shanthi Thompson

Jesus Church is in the village of Troutbeck in the Lake District, Cumbria, England. It is an active Anglican parish church in the deanery of Windermere, the archdeaconry of Westmorland and Furness, and the diocese of Carlisle. The church is situated on the A592 Windermere to Patterdale road and is recorded in the National Heritage List for England as a designated Grade II* listed building. Its benefice is united with that of St Martin's Church, Bowness-on-Windermere; St Anne's Church, Ings; St Cuthbert's Church, Kentmere; St James' Church, Staveley and St Mary's Church, Windermere.

== History ==
There has been a church on this site since at least 1506, in order to serve the settlements in the Troutbeck Valley. The current church building was built in 1736, but retains many features from the earlier building.

== Architecture ==
=== Exterior ===
Jesus Church is constructed in slate stone with freestone dressings and a slate roof. The tower, added in 1736, has three stages, clock faces on the west and south sides, and an embattled parapet with corner merlons.

=== Interior ===
The nave and chancel are under a single roof, with the large beams being from the original church building. There is a west gallery accessed from a steep staircase in the tower. Seating is provided in the way of mid 18th century wooden pews. At the west end of the nave is the font, consisting of a shallow octagonal bowl on a tall stem. The stone pulpit is polygonal, and is decorated with blind traceried panels. A small lean-to extension to the north elevation contains an accessible toilet and kitchen.

== Stained glass ==
The five-light east window has Perpendicular-style tracery and Pre-Raphaelite stained glass depicting scenes from the life of Jesus. It dates to 1873 and was designed by William Morris, Edward Burne-Jones and Ford Madox Brown. There are 6 pointed windows in the south wall and 7 in the north wall along with a small three-light window in the tower.

== See also ==
- Troutbeck, South Lakeland
- Listed buildings in Lakes, Cumbria
- St Mary's Church, Windermere
