= St Martin's Church, Bowness-on-Windermere =

Coordinates: 54.3641°N 2.9210°W

St Martin's Church
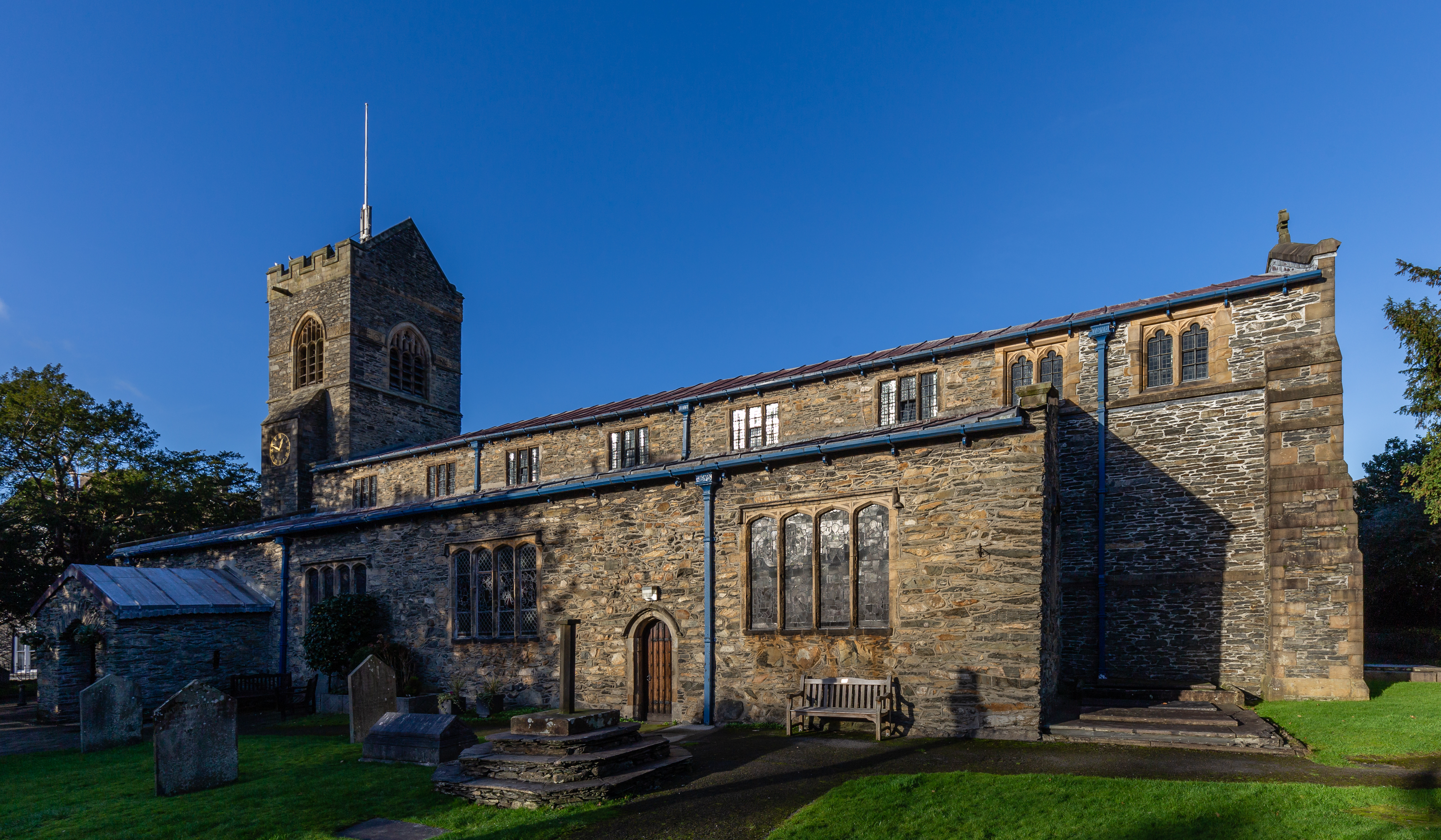
- St Martin's Church from the south

- Location in South Lakeland Location in Cumbria
- OS grid reference: SD 403 969
- Location: Bowness-on-Windermere, Cumbria
- Country: England
- Denomination: Anglican
- Website: St Martin, Bowness-on-Windermere

History
- Status: Parish church
- Dedication: Saint Martin
- Consecrated: 1483

Architecture
- Functional status: Active
- Heritage designation: Grade I
- Designated: 8 May 1950
- Architect: Paley and Austin (restoration)
- Architectural type: Church
- Style: Gothic, Gothic Revival

Specifications
- Materials: Slate rubble with sandstone dressings

Administration
- Province: York
- Diocese: Carlisle
- Archdeaconry: Westmorland and Furness
- Deanery: Windermere
- Parish: St Martin, Windermere

Clergy
- Rector: Revd James Richards

St Martin's Church stands in the centre of the town of Bowness-on-Windermere, Cumbria, England. It is an active Anglican parish church in the deanery of Windermere, the archdeaconry of Westmorland and Furness, and the diocese of Carlisle. The church is recorded in the National Heritage List for England as a designated Grade I listed building. Its benefice is united with that of St Anne's Church, Ings; St Cuthbert's Church, Kentmere; St James' Church, Staveley; Jesus Church, Troutbeck and St Mary's Church, Windermere.

== History ==
A church has been present on the site since at least 1203. This was originally a chapel of ease to the mother church at Kendal, becoming a parish in its own right in 1348 at which time the churchyard was consecrated. The church burnt down in 1480, only the font, the base of the tower, and one door surviving. A new church was built and was consecrated in 1483. Amongst the benefactors was a local carrier named Bellman, who is said to have provided the lead for the roof. The church at this time had a simple plan, consisting of a nave with aisles, and a west tower. It contained box pews, a rood loft, a three-decker pulpit and, by 1812, a west gallery. On the walls and roof beams were murals and painted biblical texts.

In 1870 the church was restored by the Lancaster architects Paley and Austin. The benefactors at this time included the local industrialist and politician Henry Schneider. Paley and Austin extended the chancel, raised the tower, to which they added a saddleback roof, and replaced the seating. During the restoration, painted inscriptions that had been covered in whitewash were rediscovered. Around this time murals were painted on the walls by Henry Hughes of London, who also restored the east window. In 1911 a vestry was added at the northeast, designed by W. L. Dolman. It was made into a memorial chapel in 1922 by Dolman to commemorate the 71 men from the parish who died in the First World War and as a thanksgiving for those who returned. The fund-raising for this was led by Sir William Forwood. Later in the 20th century, pews were removed from the back of the church to make a social area, and the choir vestry was made into a children's wing. At the turn of the millennium a glass screen was inserted in the tower arch, creating the Tower Room.

== Architecture ==
=== Exterior ===
St Martin's is constructed in slate rubble with sandstone dressings. It is roofed in lead. Its plan consists of a nave and chancel with a clerestory, north and south aisles running the whole length of the building, a south porch, a northeast chapel, and a west tower.

=== Interior ===
Hyde and Pevsner, in the Buildings of England series, describe the interior of the church as being "a strange sight", because it is constructed entirely in thickly plastered, white-painted, rubble. The piers have a square cross section, are chamfered, and are "markedly tapered". The font, a survivor from the original church, is made in sandstone. It consists of a small octagonal bowl, the corners of which are carved with heads. This may date from the 12th century, but its stem and base are later. At the base of the tower is a wooden statue of Saint Martin and a beggar, dating from the 17th century. The reredos dates from 1870, is made from marble, and contains mosaics that depict the symbols of the Four Evangelists and the Passion; it is by Bell and Almond. In front of the lectern is a display case made by Arthur Simpson in 1907 in memory of the artist Dan Gibson. It contains books, including a copy of the Breeches Bible and two 16th-century chained Bibles. All the furnishings in the northeast chapel were designed by Dolman. In the southeast vestry/office is a memorial to Richard Watson, Bishop of Llandaff, who died in 1816, by John Flaxman. On the south wall of the church is a wall memorial dated 1631. The memorials elsewhere include one to members of the Fleming family.

The east window contains stained glass from many periods. The oldest piece is believed to date from 1260. Much of the rest is from the 1460s. The central three windows depict the Crucifixion, and this is flanked by windows containing saints. Below these are kneeling figures that include benefactors, Augustinian canons, and the prior of Cartmel Priory. It is thought that these pieces were transferred from the priory. During the 1870 restoration by Henry Hughes, new pieces of glass were added, each of which is inscribed with the initials "HH". One of the older features of the window, at the top, is the coat of arms of George Washington, whose ancestor, John Wessington, owned land at nearby Warton. In the north aisle is the Carriers Arms window. It incorporates pieces of ancient glass depicting the emblems of a carrier, and commemorate the carrier Bellman who supplied the lead for the roof. Elsewhere there is stained glass by Ward and Hughes from 1881, and by Powell's and by A. K Nicholson, both dated 1915. The glass in the northeast chapel, dating from the 1920s, is by Shrigley and Hunt.

On the walls of the nave and on the beams are inscriptions. In the spandrels of the arches are catechetical texts believed to be from a book by Robert Openshawe published in 1590. On an arch facing the lectern is a thanksgiving poem dated 1629 for deliverance following the Gunpowder Plot. Elsewhere there are biblical texts. In the chancel and nave are murals in tempera and oil by Henry Hughes. The screen to the southeast vestry/office was moved here from St John's Church, Windermere, when it closed in 1995. This was designed by Dan Gibson and carved by the vicar and parishioners of St. John's. It is in Arts and Crafts style, and contains openwork panels. The screen in the tower arch, dating from 2000, consists of etched glass panels standing on a wood and glass base. The etchings were executed by Sally Scott, and depict angels and music. The three-manual organ was built in 1922 by Jardine and Company, and rebuilt in 1964 by J. H. Cowan of Liverpool. It was restored in 1999. There is a ring of eight bells, all cast in 1872 by John Warner and Sons.

The interior is also home to several historic books dating back to the 16th and 17th centuries that are on display.

== External features ==
In the churchyard is a tomb with a headstone dated 1822 inscribed to the memory of a freed slave named Rasselas Belfield, who is described as "A Native of Abyssinia". It is thought that he had been a valet to Peter Taylor of Belfield house. The tomb is listed at Grade II. Against the wall of the south aisle is a white veined marble slab to John Bolton, a slave trader and plantation owner who died in 1837. Also in the churchyard is a South African War memorial dated 1903.

== See also ==
- Grade I listed churches in Cumbria
- Listed buildings in Windermere, Cumbria (town)
- List of ecclesiastical works by Paley and Austin
