= St Mary's Church, Windermere =

Coordinates: 54.3809°N 2.9103°W

St Mary's Church
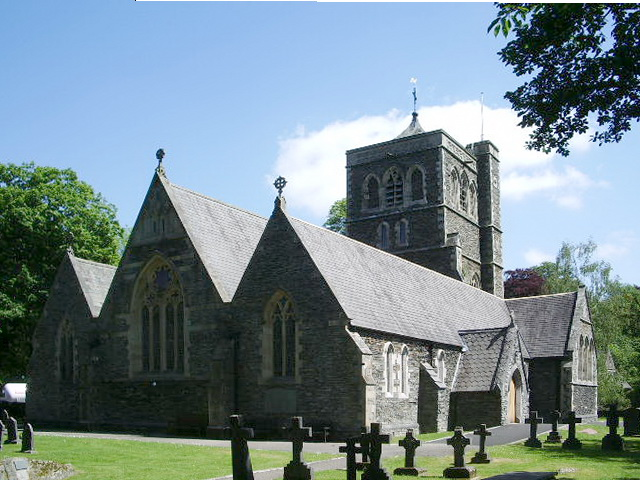
- St Mary's Church from the southwest

- Location in South Lakeland Location in Cumbria
- OS grid reference: SD 410,988
- Location: Windermere, Cumbria
- Country: England
- Denomination: Anglican
- Website: St Mary, Windermere

History
- Status: Parish church
- Founder: Revd J. A. Addison
- Consecrated: 1856

Architecture
- Functional status: Active
- Heritage designation: Grade II
- Designated: 8 May 1950
- Architect(s): Miles Thompson, J. S. Crowther; Paley and Austin
- Architectural type: Church
- Style: Gothic Revival
- Groundbreaking: 1847
- Completed: 1961

Specifications
- Materials: Slate stone, sandstone dressings, slate roofs

Administration
- Province: York
- Diocese: Carlisle
- Archdeaconry: Westmorland and Furness
- Deanery: Windermere
- Parish: Wndermere (Applethwaite) St. Mary

Clergy
- Vicar: Revd Lawrence Basham

St Mary's Church is in the town of Windermere, Cumbria, England. It is an active Anglican parish church in the deanery of Windermere, the archdeaconry of Westmorland and Furness, and the diocese of Carlisle. Its benefice is united with that of St Martin's Church, Bowness-on-Windermere; St Anne's Church, Ings; St Cuthbert's Church, Kentmere; St James' Church, Staveley and Jesus Church, Troutbeck. The church is recorded in the National Heritage List for England as a designated Grade II listed building.

== History ==
The church originated as a proprietary chapel, built for Revd J. A. Addison from Liverpool in 1847–48. This was a simple structure, consisting of a nave, a chancel, and a south porch, with a bellcote over the chancel arch. In 1852 a south aisle, designed by Miles Thompson, was added. Revd Addison then had financial problems, and he sold the church to the town in 1855. It was consecrated as a parish church during the following year. Following this, a number of alterations and additions were made by the Manchester architect J. S. Crowther. In 1858 a north aisle and porch were added, followed by an extension to the west of the nave in 1861. In 1871 the Lancaster architects Paley and Austin restored the church, added a chancel and a vestry, and installed an alabaster and mosaic reredos. They also reseated the church, increasing its capacity from 536 to 656. In 1881–82 the same architects carried out work at the east and west ends of the church, and added a central tower. By this time the only remaining parts of the original chapel were the nave roof and the south porch, which had been rebuilt outside the south aisle in 1852.

Internal alterations were carried out in 1945, including the removal of the reredos. A northeast vestry designed by George Pace was added in 1961. After a fire in 1988, which destroyed the nave roof, the church was restored by Michael Bottomley in the following two years. In 2005–06 the interior of the church was reordered by Paul Grout. The aisles were partitioned behind glass to make separate spaces, and a corridor was built at the west end of the church to link the aisles. The south transept was converted into a refreshment area, served by a kitchen in the south aisle. A new altar and communion rails were built, and were sited beneath the central tower. The pipe organ was removed and replaced by an electronic organ.

== Architecture ==
=== Exterior ===
St Mary's is constructed in slate stone with sandstone dressings and slate roofs. Its plan is cruciform, consisting of a nave, north and south aisles under separate roofs, north and south porches, north and south transepts, a chancel, two vestries, and a tower at the crossing. The tower is in three stages, with a stair turret rising to a higher level at the southeast corner. In the lowest stage, on the north and south sides, are pairs of two-light transomed windows. The middle stage contains clock faces in lozenge-shaped frames on the north and south sides, and two round-arched lancet windows in the east and west sides. In the top stage are two-light bell openings on each side, flanked by blind arches. At the top of the tower is a parapet with a quatrefoil frieze, and a small pyramidal roof.

The five-light east window is in Decorated style. At the top of the east gable is a small stone cross. Along the north aisle are buttresses, two-light Geometric-style windows and a porch. The north transept has a three-light window, and an adjacent apsidal vestry. Along the south aisle are windows, some of which are lancets, the others containing plate tracery, and a gabled porch. In the south transept is blind arcading containing slit windows. At the west end of the church are three buttressed gables, each with topped by a small stone cross. The west window has four lights, and in each of the aisles is a two-light window; all have Decorated tracery.

=== Interior ===
The arcades between the nave and the aisles have seven bays. The arches in the north arcade have pointed arches, and those in the south arcade have round arches. The arcades to the transepts have two bays. The south aisle contains a kitchen, a meeting room and a toilet; the north aisle has been converted into a parish office, a reception area, and a lounge. The furniture, other than the recently added altar and communion rails, was designed by Paley and Austin. The choir stalls are decorated with pierced friezes, and have poppyhead finials. The wooden pulpit is polygonal, and is decorated with a frieze of pierced tracery. The font consists of a square bowl in an octagonal stem, with black marble shafts at the corners. The stained glass in the east window dates from 1893, and is by Burlison and Grylls. It depicts the Sermon on the Mount. There is stained glass in other windows by different designers.

== See also ==
- Listed buildings in Windermere, Cumbria (town)
- List of ecclesiastical works by Paley and Austin
- List of works by J. S. Crowther
- List of works by George Pace
