= Over Staveley =

Coordinates: 54.38°N 2.82°W

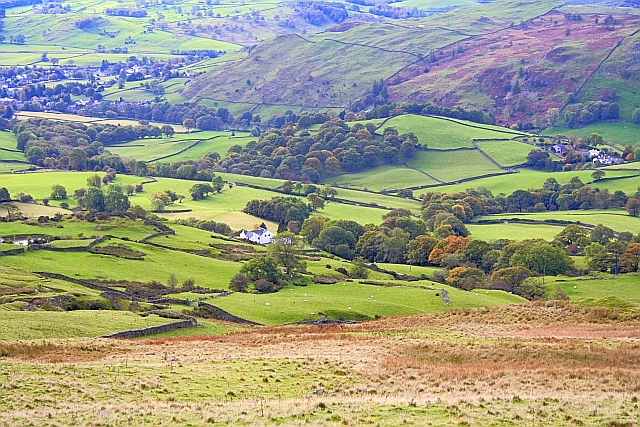
- Over Staveley. Looking down into the lower Kent valley in the parish of Over Staveley. The white house centre is 'Ghyll Bank'

- Location in South Lakeland Location within Cumbria
- Population: 437
- OS grid reference: SD4798
- Unitary authority: Westmorland and Furness
- Ceremonial county: Cumbria
- Region: North West
- Country: England
- Sovereign state: United Kingdom
- Post town: KENDAL
- Postcode district: LA8
- Dialling code: 01539
- Police: Cumbria
- Fire: Cumbria
- Ambulance: North West
- UK Parliament: Westmorland and Lonsdale

Over Staveley is a civil parish in Westmorland and Furness, Cumbria, England. The parish comprises most of the village of Staveley north of the River Gowan, and areas of farmland and fell (including Brunt Knott) extending some 3 miles (5 km) north of the village. At the 2011 census it had a population of 437.

The parish is within the Lake District National Park. It has a joint parish council with Hugill and Nether Staveley, formed in 2004 and called Staveley with Ings Parish Council.

== See also ==
- Listed buildings in Over Staveley
