= Nether Staveley =

Coordinates: 54.375°N 2.819°W

- Location in South Lakeland Location within Cumbria
- Population: 710
- OS grid reference: SD4798
- Unitary authority: Westmorland and Furness
- Ceremonial county: Cumbria
- Region: North West
- Country: England
- Sovereign state: United Kingdom
- Post town: KENDAL
- Postcode district: LA8
- Dialling code: 01539
- Police: Cumbria
- Fire: Cumbria
- Ambulance: North West
- UK Parliament: Westmorland and Lonsdale

Nether Staveley is a civil parish in Westmorland and Furness, Cumbria, England. The parish comprises the part of the village of Staveley south of the River Gowan and River Kent, and areas of farmland south of the village. In the 2001 census the parish had a population of 677, increasing at the 2011 census to 710.

It has a joint parish council with Hugill and Over Staveley, formed in 2004 and called Staveley with Ings Parish Council.

== See also ==
- Listed buildings in Nether Staveley
