= St James' Church, Staveley =

St James’ Church, Staveley
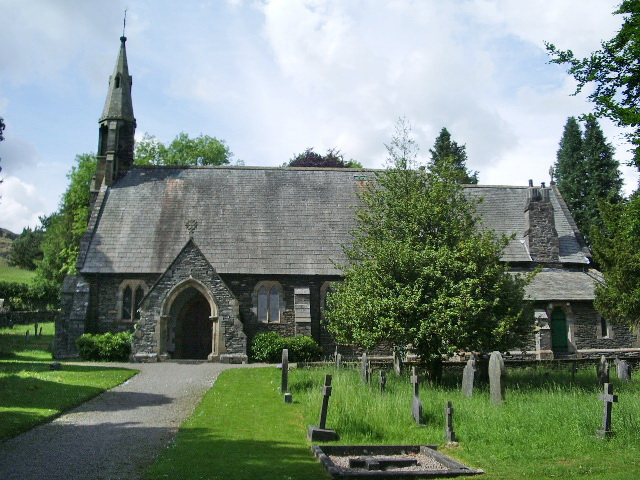
- St James’ Church, Staveley

- Location within Cumbria
- 54°22′48.74″N 2°49′6.86″W
- OS grid reference: SD 46940 98601
- Location: Staveley, Cumbria
- Country: England
- Denomination: Church of England

History
- Dedication: St James
- Consecrated: 24 April 1865

Architecture
- Heritage designation: Grade II listed
- Architect: J. S. Crowther
- Groundbreaking: 24 September 1863
- Completed: 1865
- Construction cost: £1,500 (equivalent to £162,900 in 2025)

Specifications
- Capacity: 300 persons

Administration
- Diocese: Carlisle
- Archdeaconry: Westmoreland & Furness
- Deanery: Windermere
- Parish: Staveley

St James' Church, Staveley is a Grade II listed parish church in the Church of England in Staveley, Cumbria. As at 2026, the building is closed following the identification of structural problems in 2025.

Its benefice is united with that of St Martin's Church, Bowness-on-Windermere; St Anne's Church, Ings; St Cuthbert's Church, Kentmere; Jesus Church, Troutbeck and St Mary's Church, Windermere.

== History ==
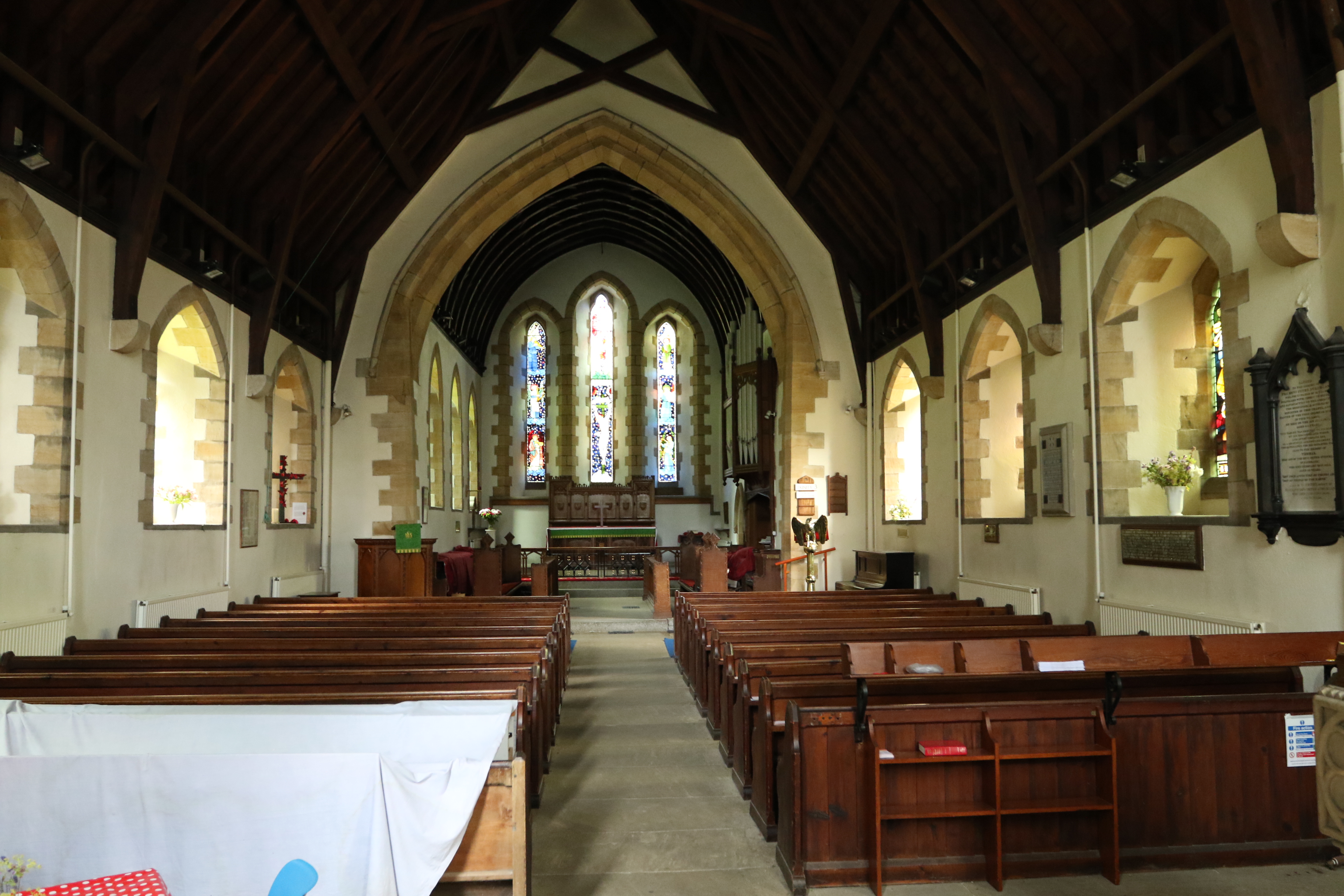
The nave and chancel

In the 1860s Staveley's 14th century church was replaced with a new one on a different site. Only the tower of the old church survives. The new church was designed by the architect, J. S. Crowther of Manchester, in Early English style. The foundation stone was laid on 24 September 1863 by General Upton, acting on behalf of Hon. Mrs Howard, the Lady of the Manor.

It was consecrated by the Bishop of Carlisle, Rt Revd Samuel Waldegrave on 24 April 1865 at which point the only outstanding item was the spirelet.

== Stained glass ==
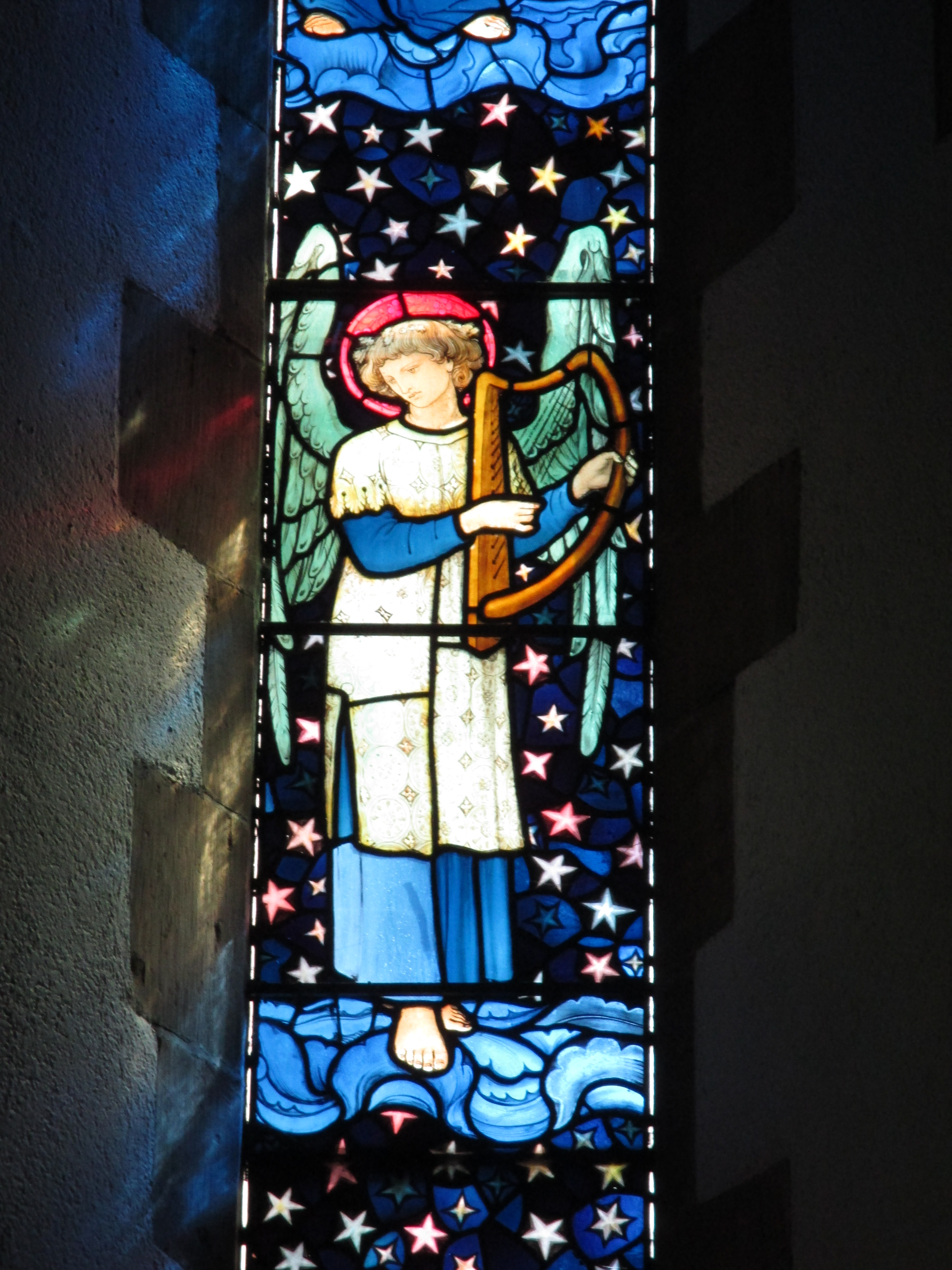
An angel from the East Window. 1878.

The Pre-Raphaelite stained-glass windows, made by Morris and Co to designs of Edward Burne-Jones, are agreed to be outstanding. A light from the East Window was reproduced on a Christmas stamp (one of the United Kingdom commemorative stamps of 2009). The Royal Mail's set of Christmas stamps that year marked the impact of the Pre-Raphaelite movement on church windows.

== Organ ==
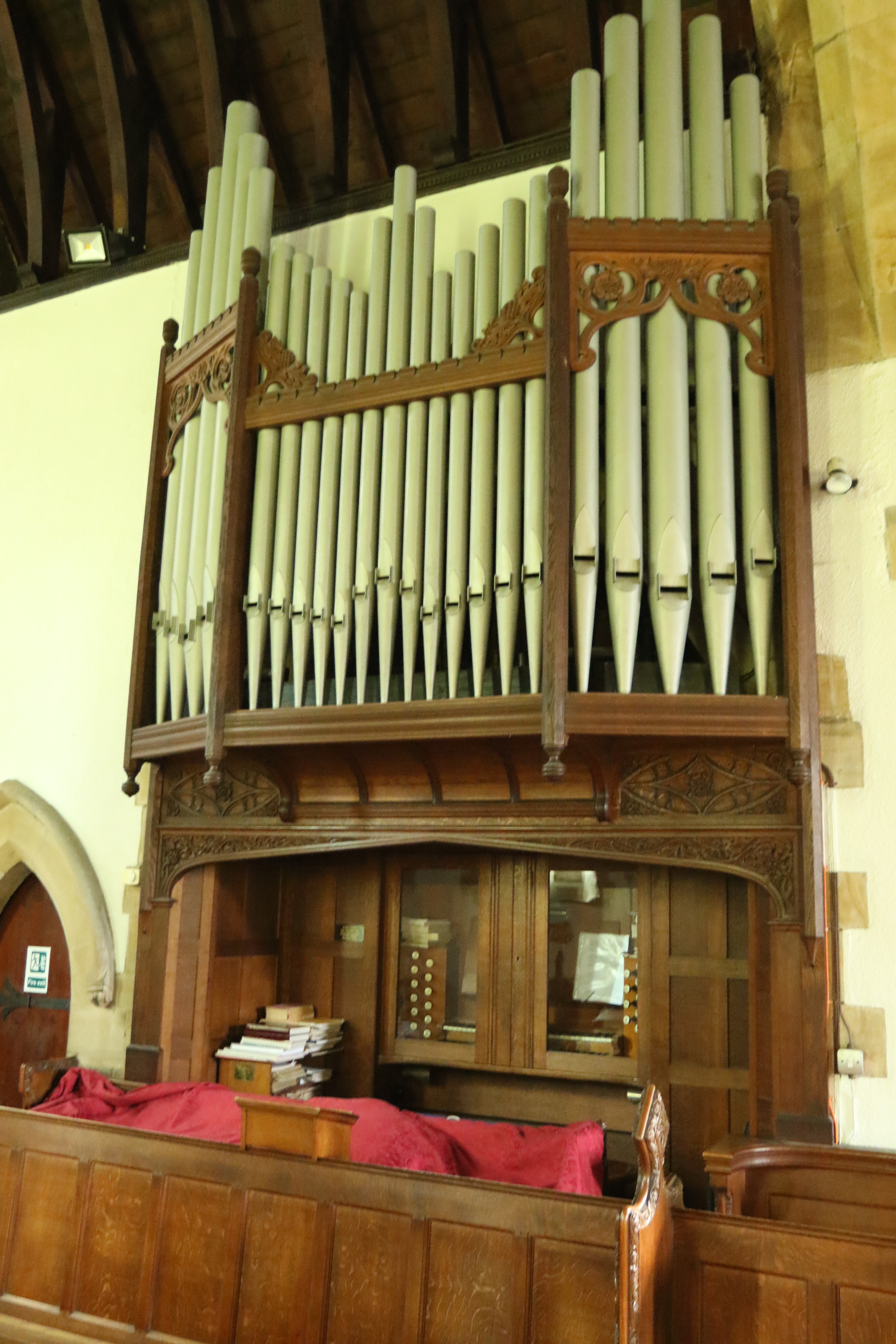
The organ

The church organ was built by Wilkinson and Son of Kendal and inaugurated on 25 September 1866 by Mr Smallwood of St George's Church, Kendal. A specification of the organ can be found on the National Pipe Organ Register.

== Incumbents ==
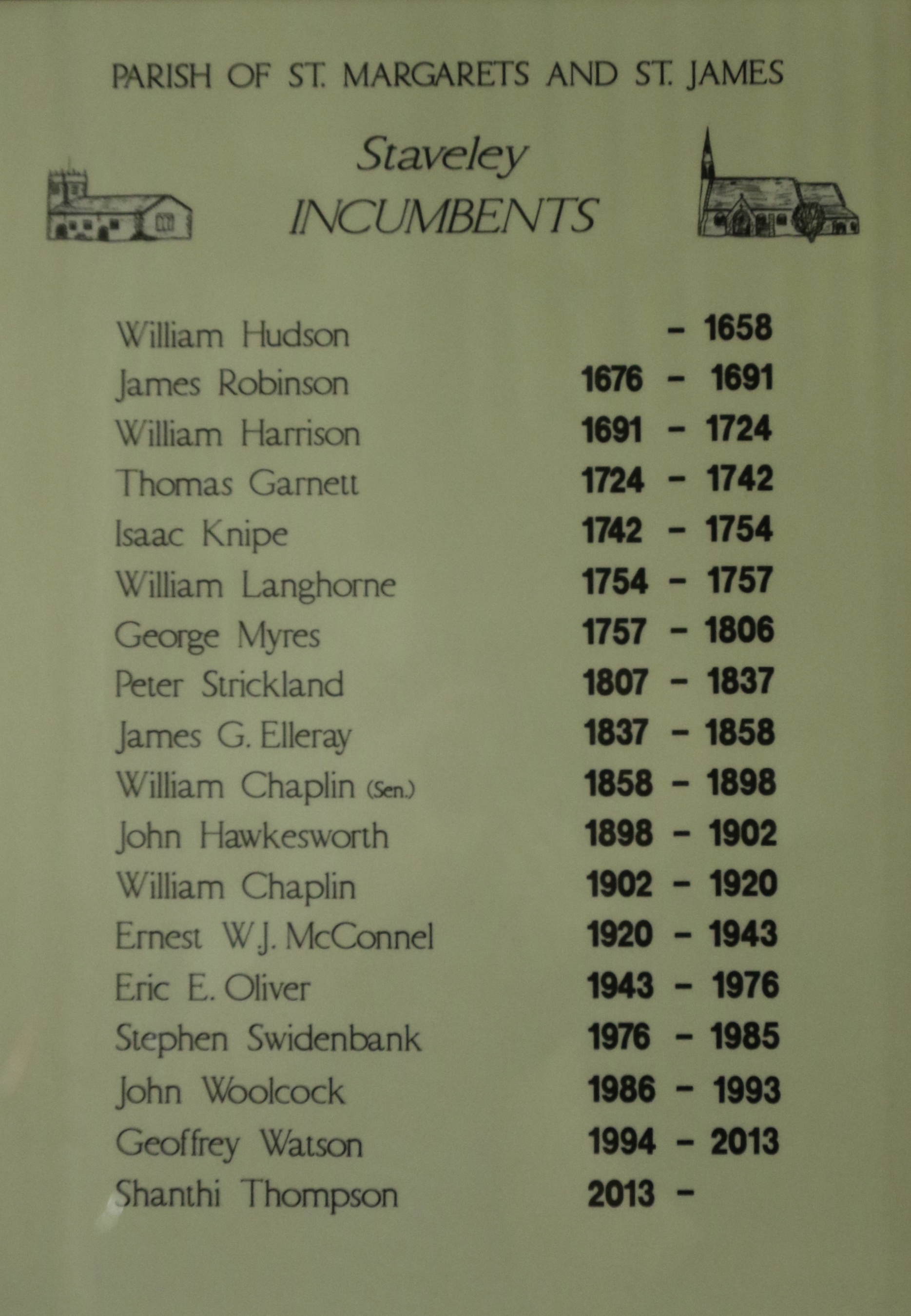
List of incumbents framed inside the church

- William Hudson ???? - 1658
- James Robinson 1676 - 1691
- William Harrison 1691 - 1724
- Thomas Garnett 1724 - 1742
- Isaac Knipe 1742 - 1754
- William Langhorne 1754 - 1757
- George Myres 1757 - 1806
- Peter Strickland 1807 - 1837
- James G. Elleray 1837 - 1858
- William Chaplin (Sen.) 1858 - 1898
- John Hawkesworth 1898 - 1902
- William Chaplin 1902 - 1920
- Ernest W.J. McConnel 1920 - 1943
- Eric E. Oliver 1943 - 1976
- Stephen Swidenbank 1976 - 1985
- John Woolcock 1986 - 1993
- Geoffrey Watson 1994 - 2013
- Shanthi Thompson 2013 - 2021
- Olivia Haines
