= Hugill =

Coordinates: 54.380°N 2.854°W

- Civil parish
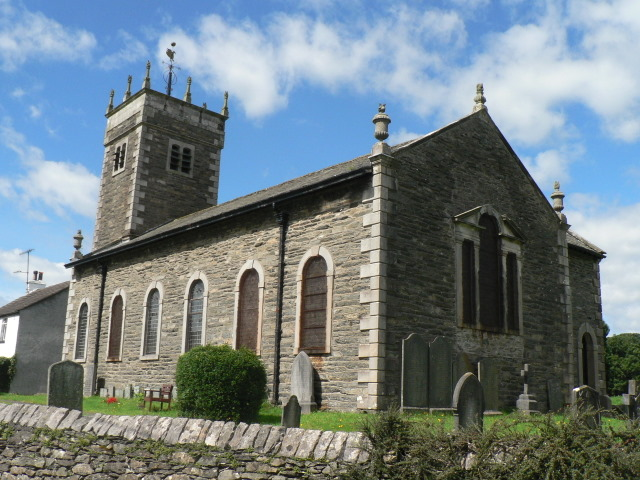
- St Anne's Church, Ings

- Location in the former South Lakeland district Location within Cumbria
- Population: 446 (2011 Census)
- OS grid reference: SD4498
- Civil parish: Hugill
- Unitary authority: Westmorland and Furness
- Ceremonial county: Cumbria
- Region: North West
- Country: England
- Sovereign state: United Kingdom
- Post town: KENDAL
- Postcode district: LA8
- Dialling code: 01539
- Police: Cumbria
- Fire: Cumbria
- Ambulance: North West
- UK Parliament: Westmorland and Lonsdale

Hugill is a civil parish in Cumbria, England. Hugill includes the village of Ings and the hamlets of Grassgarth, and Reston plus a large part of the village of Staveley and the west bank of the River Kent north of Barley Bridge. It was formerly a part of the Barony of Kendal. In the 2001 census the parish had a population of 416, increasing at the 2011 census to 446. Approximately 60% of the population live in Staveley or the Kent valley.

In the 1870s, Hugill was described as

The township lies on the Kendal and Windermere railway, 2 miles E of Windermere; and contains the hamlets of Ings, Grass-Garth, and BorwickFold. Reston Scar is a prominent feature in the valley.

Staveley with Ings Parish Council represents the three civil parishes of Hugill, Nether Staveley and Over Staveley. It has produced two ambitious Parish Plans, which have set out "aspirations for the future." that are concerned with improving the environment, public transport, highways, village facilities housing and general development

== Brief history ==
Hugill was previously joined with the Barony of Kendal, after the death of William de Lancastre III the Barony was divided into fees. Hugill fell under the category of the 'Marquis fee'. Throughout the time that Kendall was separated, according to the archives retrieved and analysed by Lancaster University "The barony was partitioned between heiresses in 1247" by the 15th century the Marquis fee "came to the Crown by attainder of William Parr" This specific area that Hugill fell under the category of the Marquis fee only covered a quarter of the Kendal of Barony. According to the Lonsdale Archive, the Lowther family "accumulated extensive estates, including the Lordship of numerous manors in Cumberland and Westmorland" The Marquis fee was then "leased to the Lowther's after 1705."

== Local attractions ==
The parish is within the Lake District National Park, and includes several fells popular with fellwalkers. Reston Scar, Hugill Fell and High Knott (the location of Williamson's Monument, a Grade II listed building) are fells described in A. Wainwright's The Outlying Fells of Lakeland.

Other amenities include the Windermere Golf Club and the Hawkshead brewery hall which opened in 2010.

== Development of the Churches ==
According to 'Nicolson and Burn' who focused on the History of the counties of Westmorland and Cumberland The chapel of Staveley, which was once a place of worship has undertaken many changes " Staveley and Hugill were originally one chapelry. But afterwards a separate chapel was erected at Ings in Hugill" Considering Staveley and Hugill was once sharing the Christian place of worship the building that was once used for this process has now become a cottage holiday destination. "The Chapel has been imaginatively created from part of this former place of worship in the centre of Staveley" Due to its location, amenities such as the local butchers and post office is "a few hundred yards from the cottage, the village is an ideal base for those not wishing to be too dependent on the car." St Anne's church is the current main place of Christian worship in Hugill. According to the 'Listed Buildings 2010' survey, the church "dated 1743 on plaque"

== Geography ==
The village of Ings is strategically placed on the A591, 1 mile west of Staveley and 2 miles east of Windermere. The 'Lakes Line', Oxenholme to Windermere railway line, runs about 1/4-mile to the south of Ings but does not have a stopping place. According to the Census data collection in 2011 the different types of households in Hugill are widely spread. The majority of the population fall under the category concerning the 'unshared dwelling, whole house or bungalow' withholds 31% of the residents in the Parish. In contrast many of the categories such as 'shared dwelling' and 'caravans and temporary structures' have 0% of the residents living there.

Chart to Show Different Household Types for the Residents in Hugill

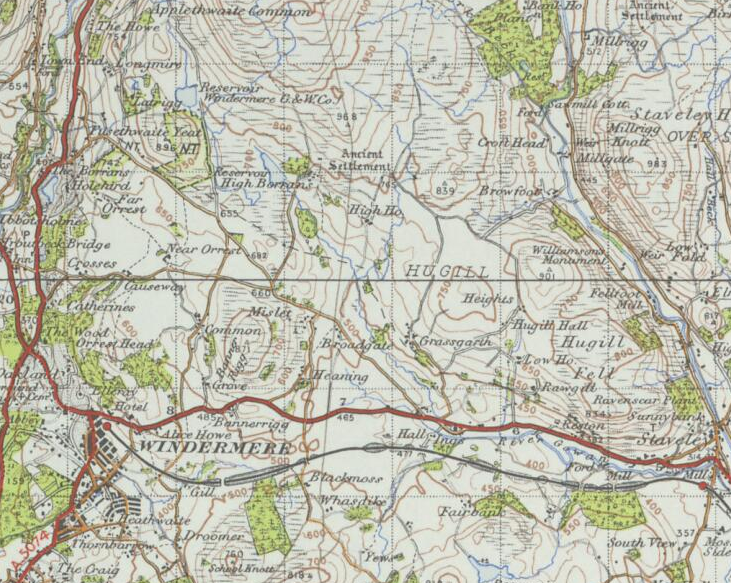
Ordnance Survey of Great Britain New Popular Edition, Sheet 89 – Lancaster and Kendal

According to Hugill Population Time Series 1881–2011, there was a large population increase during 1880 and 1890 having a range of approximately 170 people. In addition to this during the decade of 1900 population decreased from 570 to 320 (approximately). From 1960 to the next few decades there has been a constant increase in population. Showing a positive correlation.

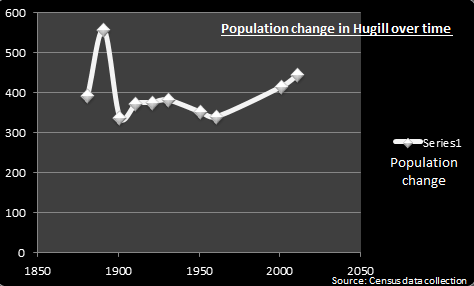
Graph to illustrate the population change in Hugill from 1881 to 2011

== Historical and Modern Occupations ==
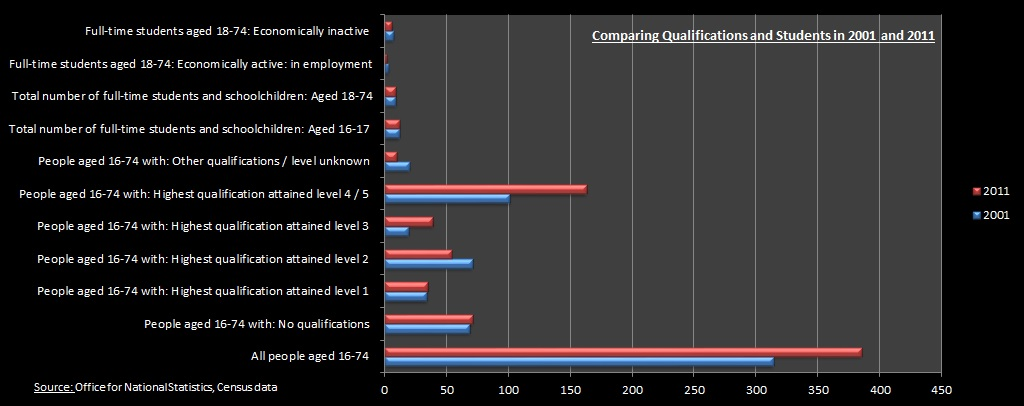
Graph to compare the Qualifications and Students in Hugill throughout the year of 2001 and 2011

The majority of the population in Hugill received highest attained qualification at level 4/5. In 2011 (approximately) 135 people achieved this level. Comparing this with a level 1 qualification there is a range of 94 people.

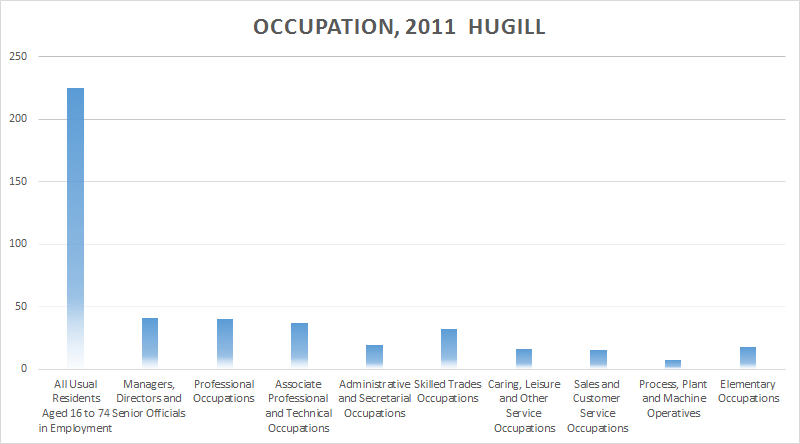
Graph to show Occupation in Hugill

The main Occupation in Hugill are under the category of 'Managers, Directors and Senior Officials' having 47 people according to the 2011 census statistics. Contrasting this with the lowest category, being 'Process, Plant and Machine Operatives' only having 7 people.

== See also ==
- Listed buildings in Hugill
