= Listed buildings in Over Staveley =

Over Staveley is a civil parish in Westmorland and Furness, Cumbria, England. It contains six listed buildings that are recorded in the National Heritage List for England. Of these, one is listed at Grade II*, the middle of the three grades, and the others are at Grade II, the lowest grade. The parish contains the village of Staveley and the surrounding countryside. The listed buildings consist of the tower of a former church, a bridge, a house, a public house, a mill, and a church.

== Key ==
Grade	Criteria
II*	Particularly important buildings of more than special interest
II	Buildings of national importance and special interest

== Buildings ==
Name and location	Photograph	Date	Notes	Grade
Tower of Chapel of St Margaret; 54.37632°N 2.81536°W		c. 1589	The rest of the church was demolished in 1865. The tower is in stone with limestone dressings, pinnacles and copings to the parapet. It has a west doorway with moulded jambs, a round head and a hood mould. Above it is a three-light Perpendicular window with a hood mould flanked by small niches. The bell openings have a slate surround and louvres, and at the top is a gable containing a clock face. There is also a plaque commemorating the men who served in the Boer War.	II*
Barley Bridge; 54.38122°N 2.81712°W		17th century (possible)	The bridge carries Hall Lane over River Kent, and the north side was partly rebuilt in the 20th century. It is in slate rubble and consists of two segmental arches, with cutwaters on the central pier, and a refuge on the north side. The carriageway is about 8 feet (2.4 m) wide.	II
Staveley Park; 54.37670°N 2.81107°W	—	17th century (probable)	A roughcast house that has a green slate roof with a stone ridge. It has a T-shaped plan with two storeys, five irregular bays, and a single-storey lean-to at the right. On the front is a two-storey gabled porch with a round-headed opening and containing stone benches. The windows are 19th-century casements.	II
Duke William Hotel; 54.37647°N 2.81562°W		Early 19th century	The public house possibly contains earlier material. It is in roughcast stone on a plinth, with quoins and a green slate roof, hipped to the left, and with a blue glazed ridge. There are two storeys and five bays. Above the main entrance is a pediment on consoles with acanthus decoration. The windows have moulded architraves, and most are sashes.	II
Kentmere Mills; 54.38058°N 2.81676°W	—	Early to mid 19th century	The mill is in stone with through-stones, hood moulds, quoins, and a green slate roof. It has four storeys and twelve bays. Most of the windows are late 19th-century casements in original openings that have shallow segmental heads and slate voussoirs.	II
St James' Church; 54.38007°N 2.81842°W		1864–65	The church, designed by J. S. Crowther in Early English style, is in slate rubble with sandstone dressings, and has a green slate roof with a stone ridge and copings. It consists of a nave, a south porch, and a chancel. At the west end is a buttress surmounted by a double belfry with a spirelet. The east window has three lights and contains stained glass by Morris & Co. to designs by Burne-Jones.	II
