= Listed buildings in Hugill =

Hugill is a civil parish in Westmorland and Furness, Cumbria, England. It contains nine listed buildings that are recorded in the National Heritage List for England. Of these, two are listed at Grade II*, the middle of the three grades, and the others are at Grade II, the lowest grade. The parish is in the Lake District National Park and is almost completely rural, the only settlement being the village of Ings. Most of the listed buildings are farmhouses and farm buildings, the others being a country house, a monument, a church, and a school later used as a parish hall.

== Key ==
Grade	Criteria
II*	Particularly important buildings of more than special interest
II	Buildings of national importance and special interest

== Buildings ==
Name and location	Photograph	Date	Notes	Grade
High House and stable 54.39717°N 2.86731°W	—	Late 16th or early 17th century (probable)	The farmhouse and stable are in roughcast stone, and have a green slate roof with a stone ridge. The building has a roughly H-shaped plan, it is in two storeys, and has a massive chimney stock with a tapering circular shaft. There is a lean-to porch, a small-paned window, a sash window, and the other windows are casements.	II
Whasdike Farmhouse; 54.37339°N 2.87248°W	—	17th century or earlier	Originally a farmhouse with shippon and hay and bracken lofts, later extended at the front and converted into a single dwelling. It is in roughcast stone with a green slate roof, two storeys and three bays. There is a central gabled stone porch, and the windows are 19th-century sashes. Inside the farmhouse is an inglenook.	II
Hill Farmhouse and barn 54.38181°N 2.85954°W	—	17th century	Originally a farmhouse and a shippon with a hayloft at right angles, later converted into a single dwelling. It is roughcast with a green slate roof, two storeys and four irregular bays. The house has ogee gutters with lions' heads on the junctions. On the front of the house is a 20th-century porch, and the windows are sashes.	II
Farm outbuildings, High House; 54.39731°N 2.86767°W	—	17th century	There have been alterations and additions during the following centuries. The outbuildings are in Lakeland stone with some sandstone dressings, and have roofs mainly in green slate with some corrugated sheeting. The buildings form an irregular T-shaped plan. The oldest part is the northwest range, which has four bays and an extension to the south. Inside there are three cruck trusses.	II
Reston Hall; 54.38080°N 2.83865°W	—	1743	A country house, roughcast, with a modillioned eaves cornice and a green slate roof. It has two storeys with attics, and seven bays. The doorway has an architrave and a glazed hood. The windows in the ground floor are cross-casements, and in the upper floors they are sashes.	II*
St Anne's Church; 54.38017°N 2.85433°W		1743	The church was restored and the north transept added in 1877. The church is in stone with sandstone quoins and dressings, and has a green slate roof with a stone ridge, and with urns on the corners. It consists of a nave and chancel in one cell, a north transept, and a west tower. The tower has a corniced parapet and eight pinnacles in the form of flaming torches. On the west side of the tower is a doorway with a broken pediment containing a coat of arms. The side windows have arched heads, impost blocks and keystones, and at the east end is a Venetian window under a pediment.	II*
Barn, Whasdike Farm; 54.37354°N 2.87214°W	—	18th century (probable)	The barn is in stone with a green slate roof, and incorporates other farm buildings. On the east side is a wagon doorway with a canopy, and on the roof is a weathervane.	II
Williamson's Monument; 54.39368°N 2.84195°W		1803	The monument, on the summit of High Knott, commemorates Thomas Williamson, a walker. It consists of a rough stone pillar about 8 feet (2.4 m) high. On the pillar is an inscribed plaque.	II
Ings School; 54.37990°N 2.85431°W		1869	The school has since been used as a parish hall. It is in stone with limestone dressings, quoins, and a green slate roof with a blue glazed ridge. The hall has an L-shaped plan, with a gable end facing the road. It has a single storey, and the windows are casements, some with round heads. On the gable is a bellcote.	II
