= Reston Scar =

Hill in Cumbria, England

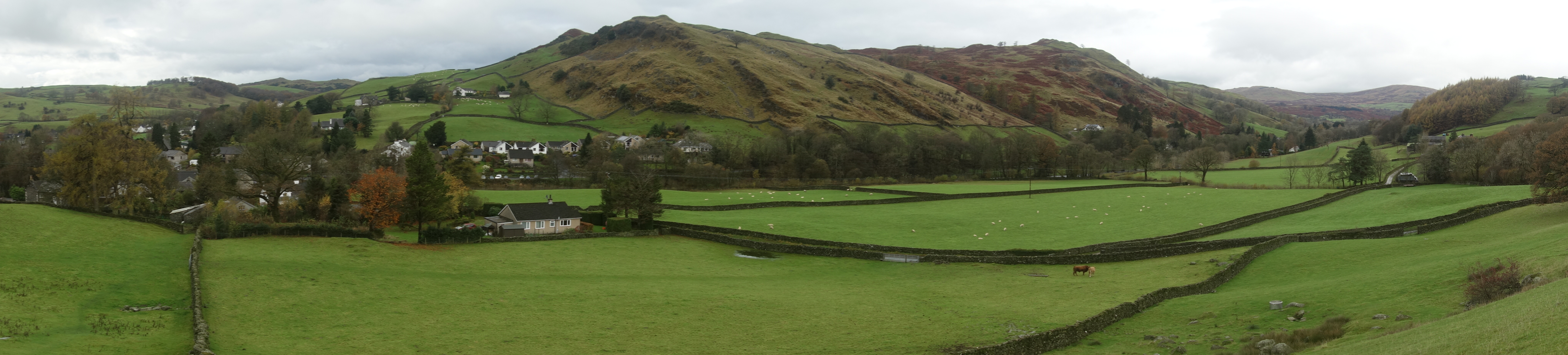
- Reston Scar rises above the houses in Staveley

Highest point
- Elevation: 255 m (837 ft)
- Listing: Outlying Wainwright
- Coordinates: 54°22′54″N 2°49′56″W

Geography
- Location within the Lake District
- Location: Cumbria, England
- Parent range: Lake District

Reston Scar is a fell in the Lake District of Cumbria, England. With a height of 837 feet (255 m), it overlooks the north side of Staveley village, and is listed among Alfred Wainwright's The Outlying Fells of Lakeland. The summit offers good views of the Coniston Fells, the Sca Fells and the Langdale Pikes.

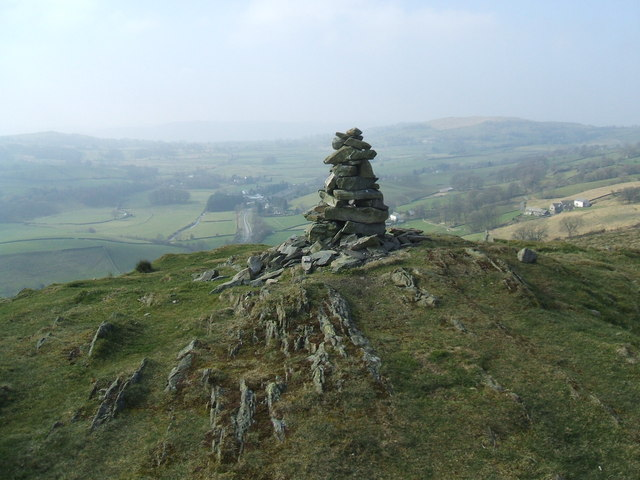
Cairn on Reston Scar

The main footpath up to the summit from Staveley passes to the south of Kemp Tarn, the largest of several ponds on the Scar. The summit has a cairn. In his book The Outlying Fells of Lakeland, Wainwright describes the ascent of Reston Scar from Staveley and calls the fell "a fine place for a siesta on a sunny day".

Wainwright, writing in 1974, says: "From here Hugill Fell and High Knott to the north appear to offer a pleasant extension of the walk, but impassable walls bar the way", but Chris Jesty, in the 2011 2nd edition of Wainwright's book, says "From here Hugill Fell to the north offers a pleasant extension to the walk and an alternative way of returning to Staveley", having mentioned in the section on Hugill Fell that "gates have been provided in the high drystone walls and a clear path links the two summits".
