= Listed buildings in Nether Staveley =

Nether Staveley is a civil parish in Westmorland and Furness, Cumbria, England. It contains eight listed buildings that are recorded in the National Heritage List for England. All the listed buildings are designated at Grade II, the lowest of the three grades, which is applied to "buildings of national importance and special interest". The parish is entirely rural, and the listed buildings consist of a farmhouse with associated farm buildings and other structures, and a coppice barn standing in an isolated site.

== Buildings ==
Name and location	Photograph	Date	Notes
The Ashes Farmhouse; 54.36550°N 2.81760°W	—	17th century	A farmhouse and cottage, later combined into one dwelling, it is in stone with a green slate roof, hipped at the left, with a stone ridge, and has an L-shaped plan. The house has two storeys with attics and three bays, and a gabled timber porch. The cottage has two storeys, a gabled stone porch, and a lean-to on the right.
Barn northeast of The Ashes Farmhouse; 54.36565°N 2.81723°W	—	17th century (probable)	A barn, a stable and a hayloft in stone with quoins, and a green slate roof with a stone ridge. The barn has four bays, the hayloft has three, and they contain mullioned windows, some of which are blocked.
Barn north of The Ashes Farmhouse; 54.36584°N 2.81750°W	—	Probably before 1737	This possibly originated as a gatehouse and was later used as a barn. It is in stone, with a plinth on the north side, and has a green slate roof with a stone ridge and a finial on the east gable. The barn has an L-shaped plan and five bays. There are two cart entrances with segmental heads, stone voussoirs and slate hood moulds, windows with stone voussoirs, keystones, and slate hood moulds, and a loft door with large voussoirs, and a slate hood mould.
Cragg Bridge; 54.36529°N 2.79844°W	—	c. 1847	The bridge was built for the Kendal and Windermere Railway, designed by Joseph Locke and built by Thomas Brassey, to carry a Winter Lane over the railway. It is in limestone and consists of a single elliptical arch. The bridge has voussoirs on impost bands, a moulded string course, and splayed parapets with flat copings. There are curving wing walls ending in low pillars with caps.
Goose Green Bridge; 54.36806°N 2.80335°W	—	c. 1847	The bridge was built for the Kendal and Windermere Railway, designed by Joseph Locke and built by Thomas Brassey, to carry a farm track over the railway. It is in limestone and consists of a single elliptical arch. The bridge has voussoirs on impost bands, a moulded string course, and splayed parapets with flat copings. There are curving wing walls ending in low pillars with caps.
Near Fairbank Bridge; 54.37561°N 2.83681°W	—	c. 1847	The bridge was built for the Kendal and Windermere Railway, designed by Joseph Locke and built by Thomas Brassey, to carry a farm track over the railway. It is in limestone and consists of a single elliptical arch. The bridge has voussoirs on impost bands, a moulded string course, and splayed parapets with flat copings. There are abutments ending in low pillars with caps.
Walls, gates and railings, The Ashes Farmhouse; 54.36561°N 2.81759°W	—	19th century (probable)	The walls are in stone with slate copings, the gates are in wrought iron, and the railings have spear heads and urn finials.
Coppice Barn; 54.37872°N 2.84958°W	—	c. 1850	The barn is a small stone building with two bays. It has a green slate roof, and blue glazed ridge tiles supported on circular rubble columns.
