= River Gowan, Cumbria =

River in Cumbria, England

Coordinates: 54.3749°N 2.8139°W

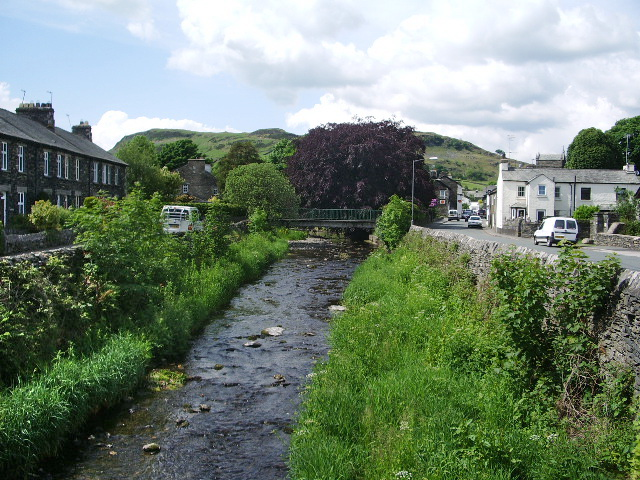
River Gowan in Staveley

The River Gowan is a short river in Cumbria, running easterly through the village of Ings before joining the River Kent at Staveley.

== Etymology ==
It is difficult to determine where the river got its name. In Scottish English, gowan the name for the common daisy or occasionally the buttercup. It is derived from the original form gollan which is the marsh marigold, the name was made famous by Robert Burns in a poem originally entitled "The Gowan" which is now known as "To a Mountain Daisy". The Lakeland poet William Wordsworth also uses the word gowan to refer to a common wayside flower indicating that the name was used in the area and therefore it is possible that the river got its name from the fact that it flows through many flower meadows on the valley floor. In Scottish Gaelic Gowen/Gowan can also mean "blacksmith". The name may therefore otherwise have come from the Scots Gaelic or from Irish missionaries who are known to have travelled in Cumbria during the Anglo-Saxon period and have given many words to the local dialect.

== Ecology ==
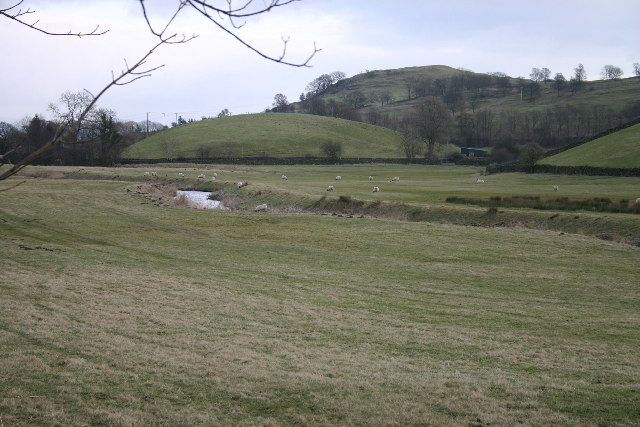
River Gowan downstream of the village of Ings

In 2013 work was completed on a river improvement project to restore meanders between Ings and Staveley involving the removal of 71 metres of man-made flood embankment. This was part of project funded by the Environment Agency and Natural England which aims to bring river units of the River Kent & Tributaries Site of Special Scientific Interest/Special Area of Conservation into "improving" condition. The Kent is designated a Special Area of Conservation, primarily as an important habitat for the endangered White-clawed Crayfish (Austropotamobius pallipes).

It is anticipated that apart from ecological benefits, the reconnection of the river with its flood plain will help alleviate flooding downstream.
