= Staveley, Cumbria =

Village in Cumbria, England

Coordinates: 54.375°N 2.818°W

Staveley
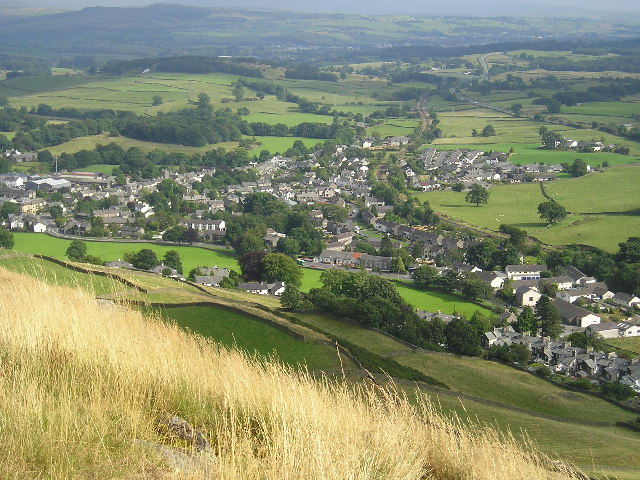
- Staveley village viewed from Reston Scar

- Location in the former South Lakeland district Location within Cumbria
- Population: 1,147 (2011)
- OS grid reference: NY469981
- Civil parish: Nether Staveley; Over Staveley
- Unitary authority: Westmorland and Furness
- Ceremonial county: Cumbria
- Region: North West
- Country: England
- Sovereign state: United Kingdom
- Post town: KENDAL
- Postcode district: LA8
- Dialling code: 01539
- Police: Cumbria
- Fire: Cumbria
- Ambulance: North West
- UK Parliament: Westmorland and Lonsdale

Staveley (grid reference SD469981) is a village in the Westmorland and Furness Unitary Authority, in Cumbria, England. Historically part of Westmorland, it is situated 4 miles (6 km) northwest of Kendal where the River Kent is joined by its tributary the Gowan. It is also known as Staveley-in-Westmorland and Staveley-in-Kendal to distinguish it from Staveley-in-Cartmel (a small village near Newby Bridge which is now in Cumbria but was previously in Lancashire). There are three civil parishes – Nether Staveley, Over Staveley and Hugill (part). Their total population at the 2011 Census was 1,593 but this includes those living in the hamlet of Ings in Hugill parish.

== Governance ==
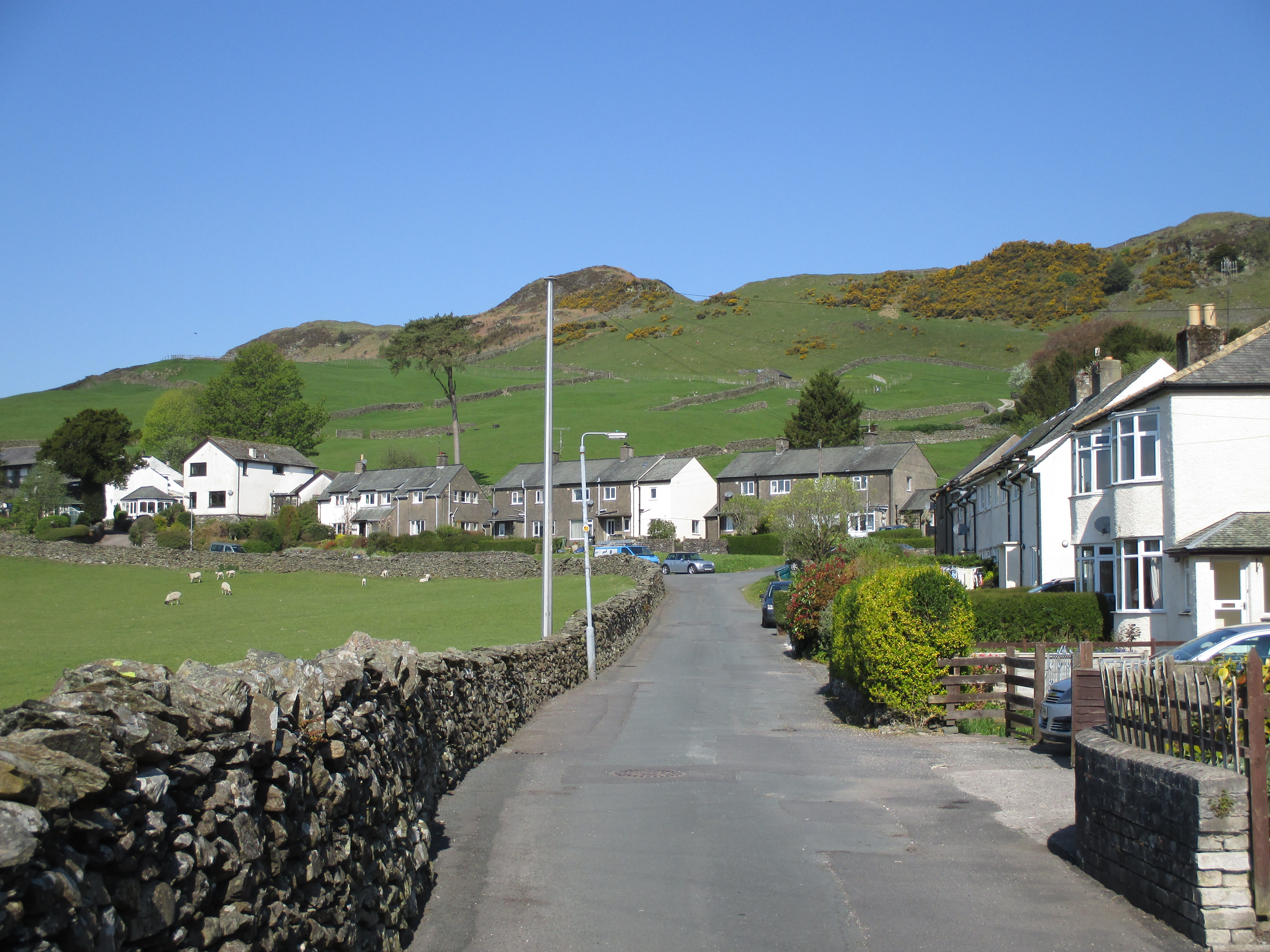
School Lane, below Reston Scar

Historically within the county of Westmorland, it became part of the new non-metropolitan county of Cumbria in 1974.

Staveley is divided between three civil parishes;

- The village south of the rivers Gowan and Kent is in Nether Staveley,
- Most of the village north of the Gowan is in Over Staveley
- Part of the village to the north-west is in Hugill

The parishes now share a grouped parish council, formed in 2004, known as Staveley with Ings Parish Council.

== Geography ==
The village is strategically placed at the junction of the rivers Kent and Gowan, at the mouth of the Kentmere Valley.

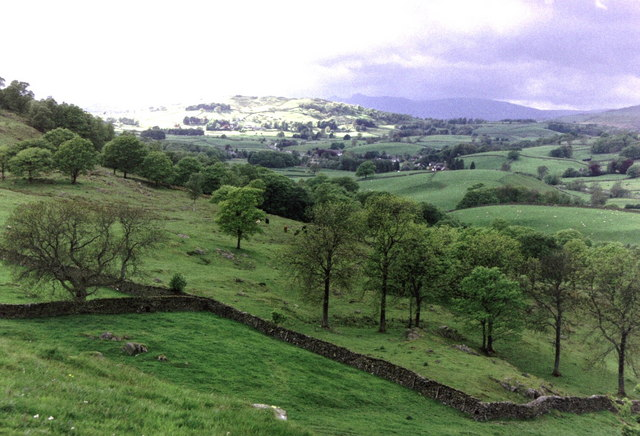
Taken on Lily Fell looking west-northwest towards Banner Rigg

Three hills overlook the village; Reston Scar on the north side on which much of the village is built, Piked Howe to the northeast known to the locals as Craggy Wood and Lily Fell to the south in the direction of the village of Crook on the opposite side of the A591 bypass. Piked Howe and Reston Scar sit either side of the opening into the Kentmere Valley. Both mark the beginning of a larger horseshoe chain of hills known as the Kentmere Round.

The nearest village to the west is Ings, a small settlement which now shares schools and parish minister with Staveley. To the south of the village is Crook, and to the north Kentmere which can only be accessed by road via Staveley village centre, meaning that the two villages have had a close relationship with each other for many centuries. But the village which had the strongest links to Staveley in more recent years is arguably Burneside which is the next stop on the railway line to the east on the way to Kendal. National Cycle Route 6 and the Dales Way footpath run through Burneside and Staveley.

The village got its name from the woodworking industry that thrived in the area due to the forests that originally covered the surrounding hills, and the close proximity of two rivers for processing the wood. Staveley means literally the 'field of staffs' (from the Middle English plural stave for staf OE stæf and the ME leye meaning pasture from Old English leah; akin to Old High German loh thicket, Latin lucus grove).

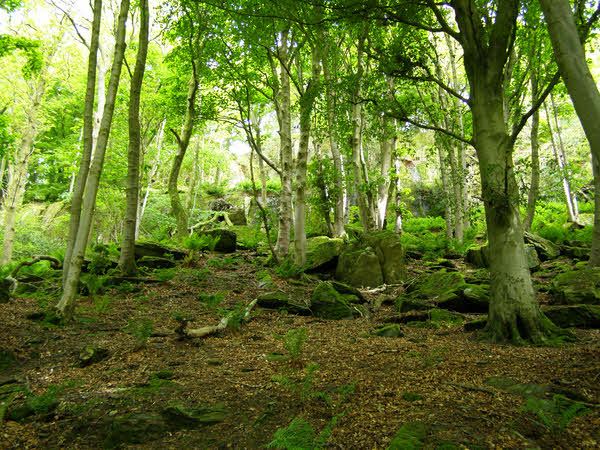
Craggy Plantation

Woods in the area include:

- Beckmickle Ing (3.58 ha). A semi-natural wood with wet woodland adjacent to the River Kent. It is managed by the Woodland Trust
- Craggy Plantation, which is mainly deciduous. This area was used in the 1990s for testing various measures to control the spread of North American grey squirrels into the native red squirrel habitats.

In 2016 the Lake District National Park Authority announced its decision to sell Craggy Wood. After a successful appeal to raise the necessary funds, ownership was transferred to the Cumbria Wildlife Trust who intend to manage it as part of a larger nature reserve by linking it to Dorothy Farrer's Spring Wood.

- Dorothy Farrer's Spring Wood (4.6 ha). This wood is managed by the Cumbria Wildlife Trust. There is a tradition of coppicing, which the trust continues in the interests of biodiversity. Birdlife includes the pied flycatcher.
- Mike's Wood (3 ha) native woodland planted in the 1990s by the organisation Friends of the Lake District.

=== River Gowan ===
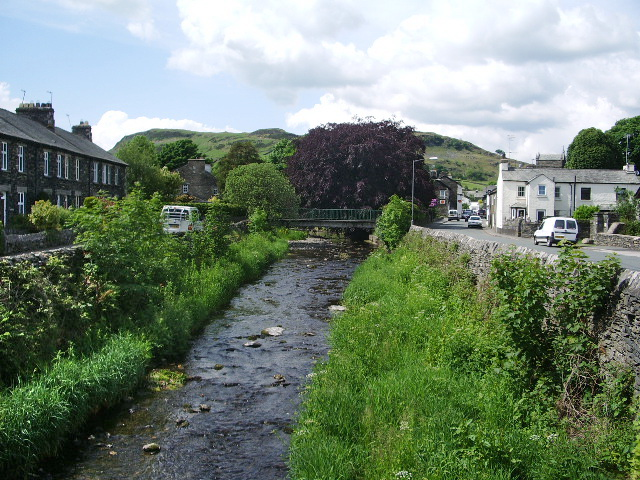
River Gowan near its confluence with the Kent

The Gowan, a tributary of the Kent, comes into the village from the west after passing through the village of Ings. There is sometimes flooding at the confluence.

There are two road bridges and also pedestrian bridges over the River Gowan in the village. As a result of the Storm Desmond flood both the road bridges were closed because of damage to their structures, cutting the village in two for vehicular traffic. The Station Road / Abbey Square bridge was reopened after minor repairs. Gowan Old Bridge, a twin arch stone bridge with attached concrete footbridge near the confluence of the rivers, had severe damage to its central pier and remained closed. It was demolished in June 2016, after the re-routing of the gas main. A new single-span concrete beam bridge was constructed to replace it and opened on May 18, 2017.

== History ==
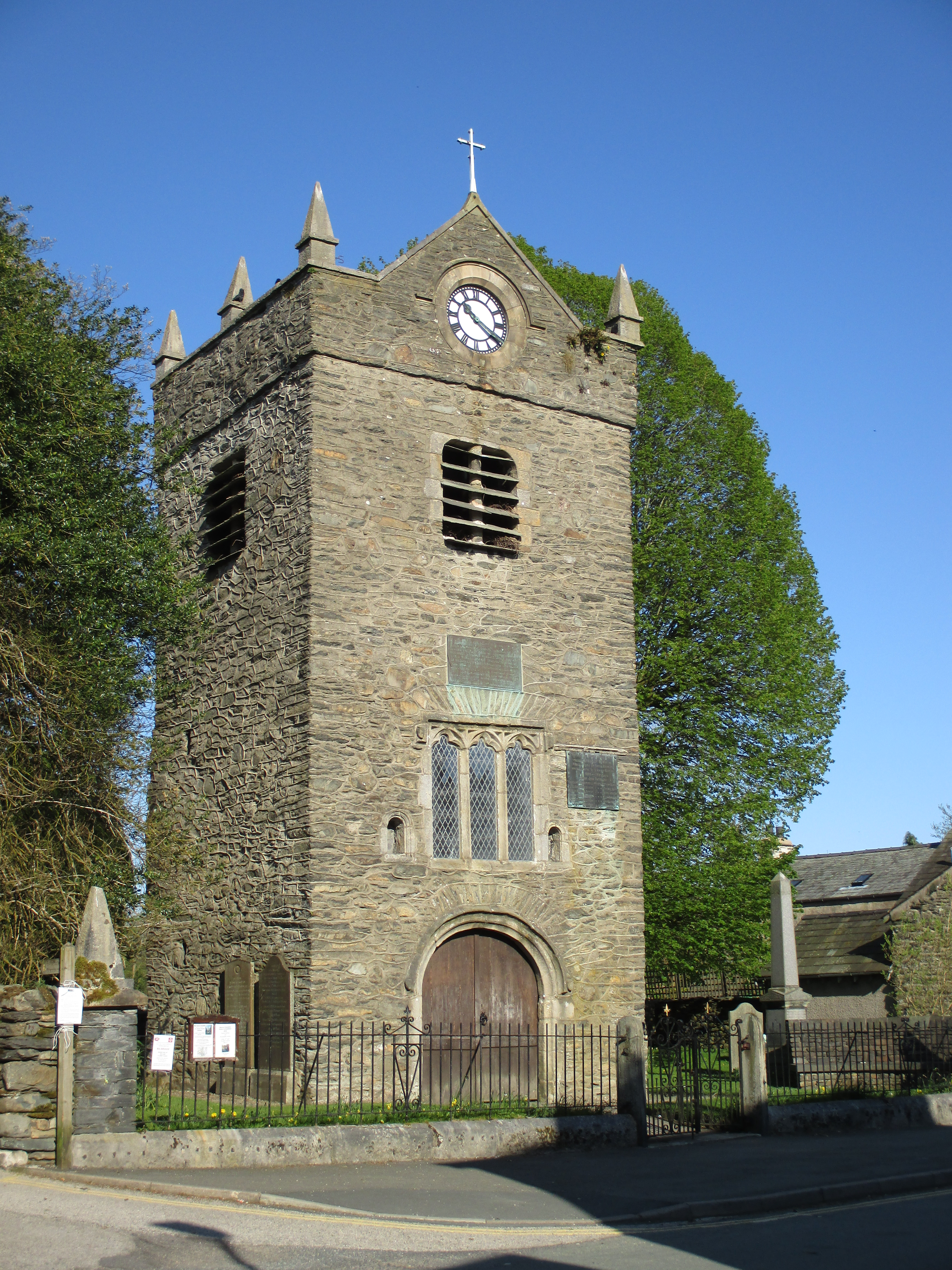
St. Margaret's Tower, the only remains of a former medieval church

The area has been inhabited since around 4000 BC (evidence of which can be seen close to High Borrans) when ancient Britons established farms. It has been suggested that the Romans built a road near Staveley to link the Roman forts at Kendal (Alauna) and Ambleside (Galava). However, the existence of any Roman road in the immediate vicinity of Kendal is not confirmed. On the other hand, the Roman road at High Street (a few miles north of Staveley) is well evidenced.

Weekly markets and a three-day annual fair were held from 1329 when the village was granted a market charter.

In the 18th century a turnpike road from Kendal to Ambleside was constructed through Staveley. In Dorothy Wordsworth's journal for 1802 there are references to an inn at Staveley (possibly the Eagle and Child). She wrote: "I am always glad to see Stavel(e)y; it is a place I dearly love to think of"

Since the 1840s Staveley has had a railway station on the Windermere Branch Line from Windermere to Oxenholme. It is one of only a few locations in the Lake District National Park to have a station, but in the 19th century most tourists continued their journey to the railhead at Windermere. Staveley remained relatively unaffected by mass tourism until the 20th century.

Another 19th-century project built through Staveley is the Thirlmere Aqueduct, commissioned in 1894. On its way to Manchester, the aqueduct passes under the River Kent at Staveley. Although the Staveley section of the aqueduct was constructed underground (via "cut-and-cover" and tunnelling techniques), some of the infrastructure associated with it is visible.

=== Mills ===
In the Middle Ages, the mills at Staveley produced woollen cloth. During the Industrial Revolution there was cotton production at Staveley, and there is an 18th-century mill building from this time. The cotton industry shifted to Lancashire, and the Staveley mills were converted to work wood. By 1850 bobbin turning was the main industry in the valley.

While there is no longer any bobbin production, there are a carpentry businesses in the village including Peter Hall.

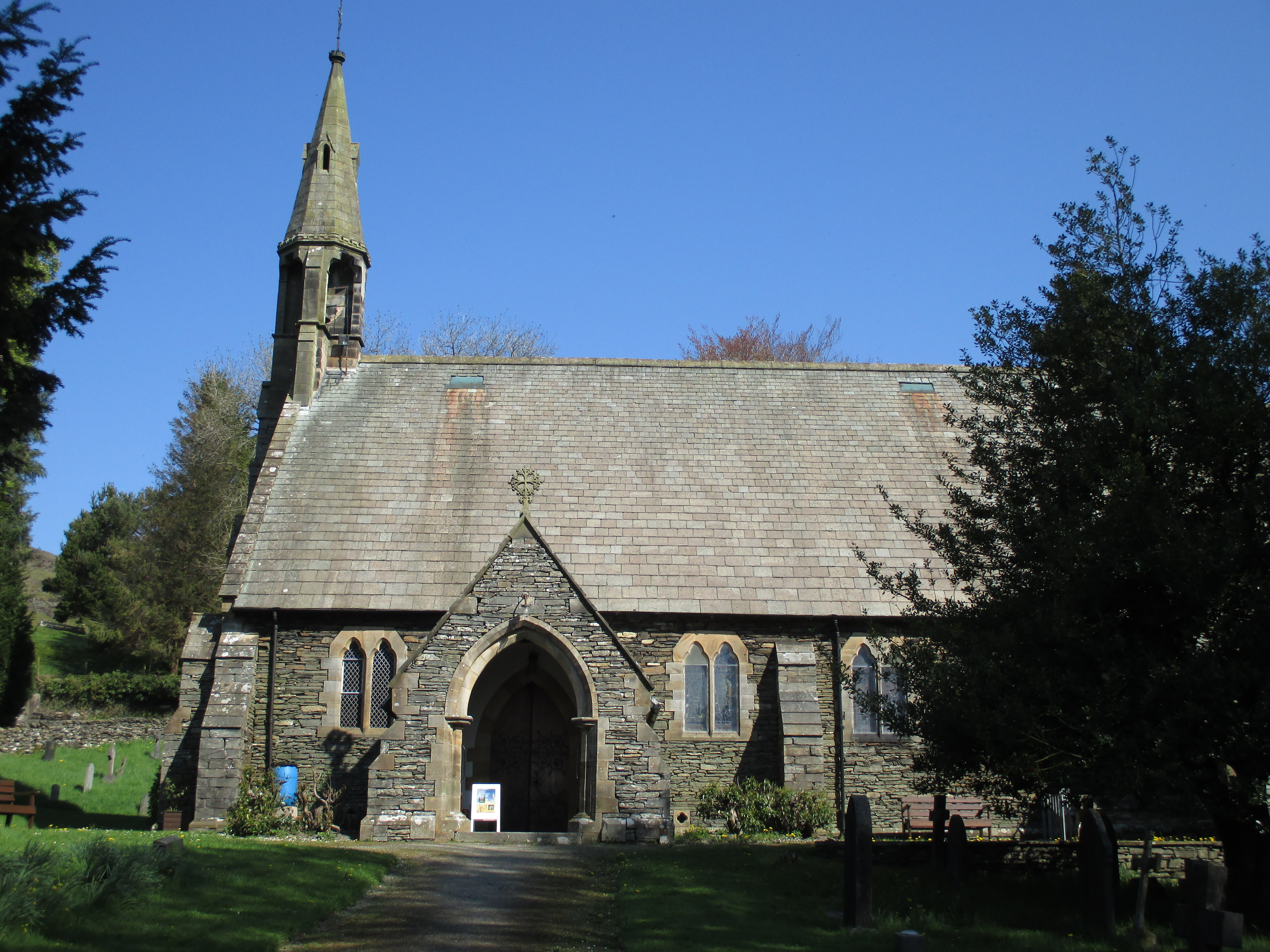
St. James's Church

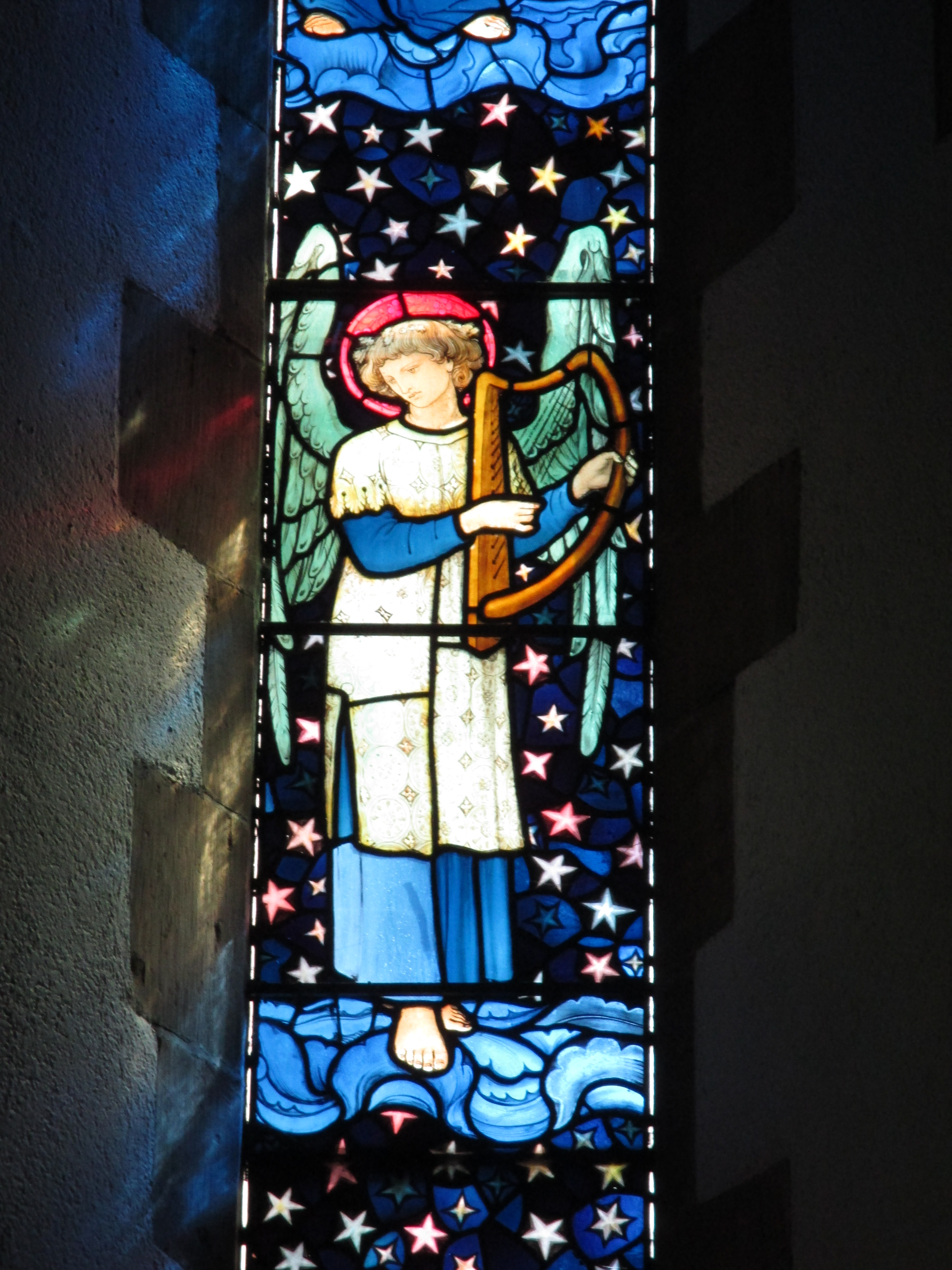
Stained glass window at St. James's Church designed by Sir Edward Burne-Jones

==== Staveley Mill Yard ====
At the weir by Wilf's Cafe visitors can see water being drawn from the River Kent, which originally powered a waterwheel, replaced in 1902 with turbines.

== Historic buildings ==
A conservation area protects much of Staveley. Originally designated to protect the centre of village, it was expanded in the 21st century, and crosses the River Kent to take in Staveley Park.

Staveley has a number of listed buildings, including its oldest building, a tower, all that remains of a medieval church dedicated to St Margaret. The structure is maintained as a clock-tower: on it is a plaque commemorating the Staveley men of F Company, Second V B Border Regiment, who served in the South Africa Campaign of 1900–01 under Major John Thompson.

In 1338 the then Lord of the manor, Sir William Thweng agreed to build a church. Before this the villagers had been expected to travel 7 miles to Kendal each Sunday for services. The church, completed in 1388, was replaced by a new parish church, built in 1864–65 to a design by J. S. Crowther. This Victorian church, dedicated to St James, is notable for the stained glass windows at the east end, which were designed by Sir Edward Burne-Jones and made by Morris and Co. They depict the Crucifixion and Ascension of Christ surrounded by angels and stars. One of the angels was used for the Royal Mail's second class Christmas stamp in 2009.

=== Other places of worship ===
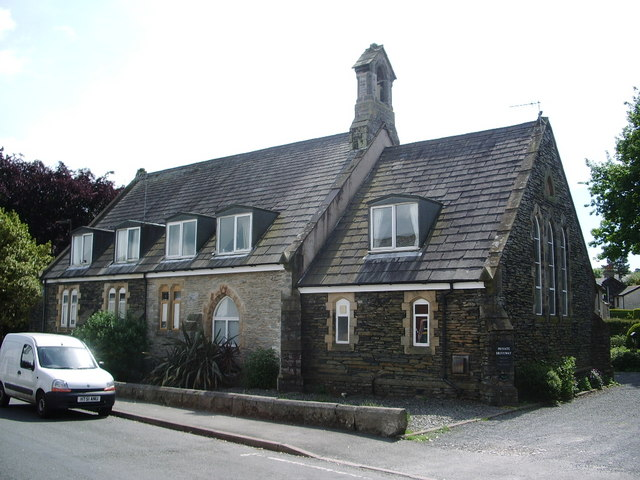
Former Primitive Methodist chapel on Main Street

There is a small Catholic church, now disused, situated on Station Road. There are two former chapels, which were Wesleyan Methodist and Primitive Methodist prior to Methodist Union in 1932. They have been converted for residential use.

== Education ==
Staveley CE Primary School was founded in 1755 and moved to its present position at Brow Lane on Reston Scar in 1840. A new building was built 30 years ago to house the infant classes. The school also caters for children from the nearby villages of Crook, Kentmere and Ings. Before the modern-day school that exists now, the school used to be housed in a small cottage on Main Street next to St. Margaret's Tower.

=== Cultural activities ===
The intimate (48 seat capacity) Staveley Roundhouse (a former gas holder) provides year-round entertainment in the form of plays, art exhibitions, music and quiz nights.

== Transport ==
=== Bus ===
The village is served by Stagecoach on the following routes:

| Number | Destination |
| 6 | Kendal or Barrow |
| 505 | Coniston or Kendal |
| 508 | Penrith or Kendal |
| 555 | Keswick or Lancaster |
| 599 | Bowness or Kendal |
| 755 | Bowness or Heysham via Morecambe |

=== Train ===
Staveley train station has services to Windermere, Kendal, Oxenholme, Lancaster, Preston, Manchester & Manchester Airport.

== See also ==
- Listed buildings in Over Staveley
- Listed buildings in Nether Staveley
