= Samuel Waldegrave =

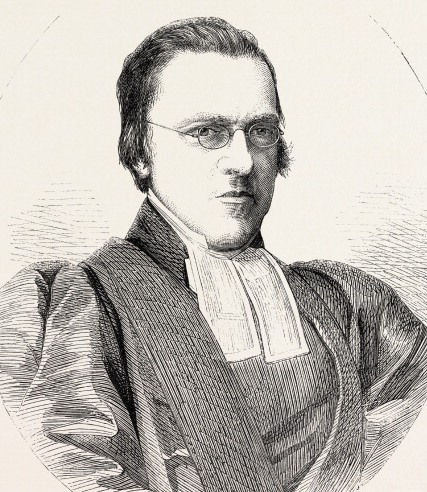
Samuel Waldegrave, from The Illustrated London News

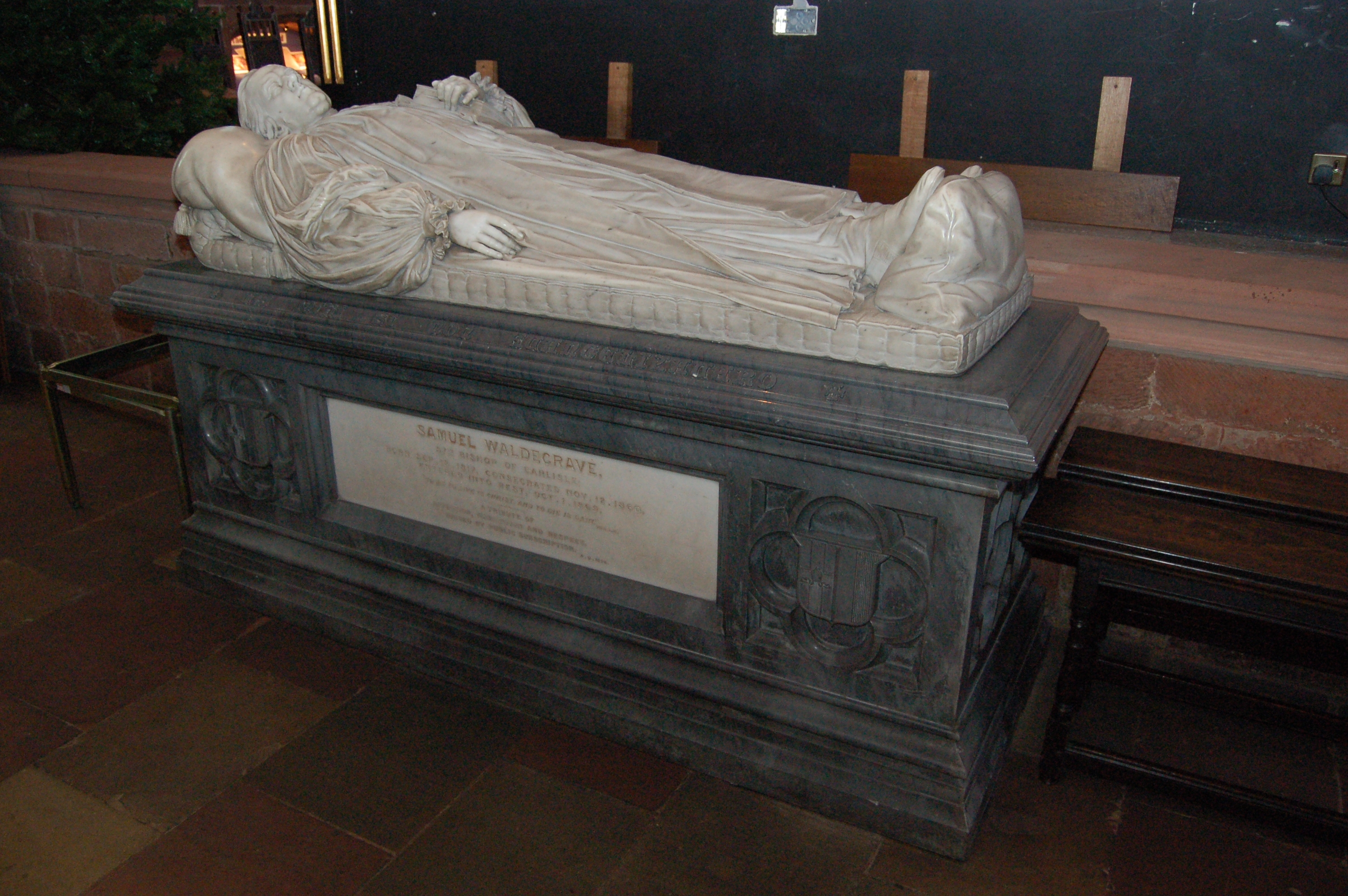
Samuel Waldegrave's tomb in Carlisle Cathedral

Hon. Samuel Waldegrave (13 September 1817 – 1 October 1869) was Bishop of Carlisle from 1860 until his death.

The second son of the 8th Earl Waldegrave, he was educated at Cheam School and graduated B.A. from Balliol College, Oxford in 1839. In 1842, he became a deacon and was then curate to St Ebbe's, Oxford and rector of Barford St Martin in 1844. He was then canon of Salisbury Cathedral in 1857 before becoming a bishop in 1860. On 23 January 1845, he had married Jane Anne Pym (d. 6 June 1877), a great-grandaunt of Lord Pym, and he died in office at Rose Castle in 1869. He left a son and a daughter.

== Notes ==
Church of England titles
Preceded by Henry Montagu Villiers	Bishop of Carlisle; 1860–1869	Succeeded by Harvey Goodwin
