= Ings, Cumbria =

Village in Cumbria, England

Coordinates: 54.3792°N 2.8537°W

Ings
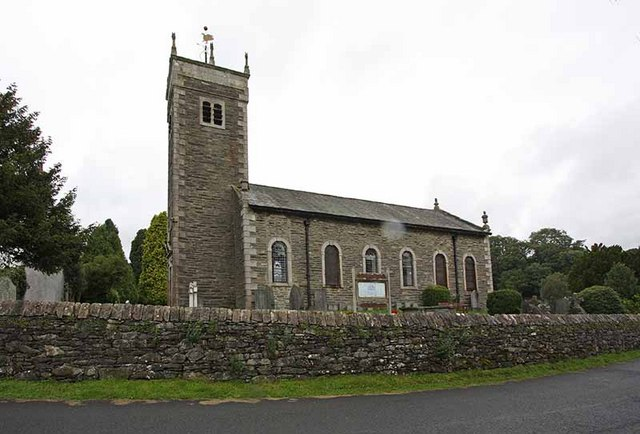
- Ings parish church

- Location in South Lakeland Location within Cumbria
- OS grid reference: SD445985
- Civil parish: Hugill
- Unitary authority: Westmorland and Furness
- Ceremonial county: Cumbria
- Region: North West
- Country: England
- Sovereign state: United Kingdom
- Post town: KENDAL
- Postcode district: LA8
- Dialling code: 01539
- Police: Cumbria
- Fire: Cumbria
- Ambulance: North West
- UK Parliament: Westmorland and Lonsdale

Ings is a village in the Westmorland and Furness Unitary Authority of Cumbria, England. It lies on the course on the River Gowan and A591 road, 2 miles (3.2 km) east of Windermere.

Ings is located in the parish of Hugill, historically a part of Westmorland. The Grade II*-listed St Anne's Church is located within the village.

== See also ==
- Listed buildings in Hugill
