= Witham bowl =

Missing piece of Anglo-Saxon silverware

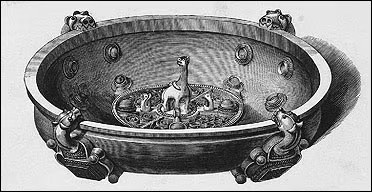
- A wood-block print after a Victorian watercolour image
- Material: Silver, bronze, and semi-precious stones
- Height: 40 millimetres (1.6 in)
- Width: Diameter 150 millimetres (5.9 in)
- Created: AD 850-950
- Discovered: 1816, River Witham, Lincolnshire
- Present location: Lost

The Witham bowl is a missing piece of Anglo-Saxon silverware, described by T. D. Kendrick in The Antiquaries Journal in 1941 as "the most remarkable piece of pre-Conquest plate ever found in England". It was last seen at the National Exhibition of Works of Art at Leeds General Infirmary in 1868, when it was owned by the MP John Heywood Hawkins.

== Discovery ==
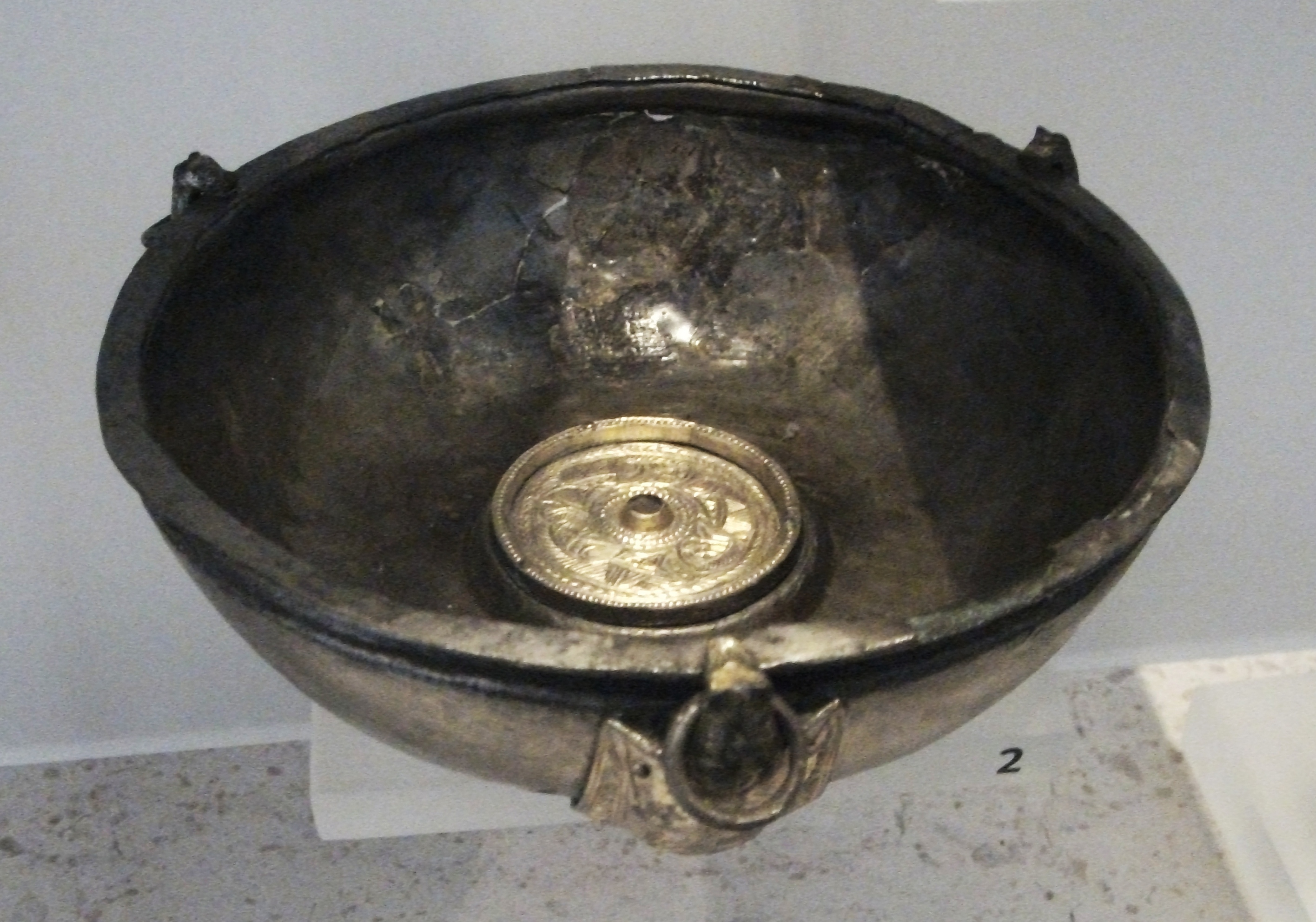
The only other silver hanging bowl known, from the St Ninian's Isle Treasure. Similar in size, but plainer

The hanging bowl is named after the River Witham in Lincolnshire, where it was discovered at Washingborough in 1816, along with several other articles - including a wooden canoe - in the course of drainage works. Its discovery was reported in the Stamford Journal of 19 April 1816. It is thought to have been made in the late 8th or early 9th century, and has a diameter of approximately 15 centimetres (5.9 in) and height of approximately 4 centimetres (1.6 in).

== Description ==
The richly decorated piece is an evolved "C bowl" with a broad circular indentation underneath. Foliate and vine-scroll filigree work decorates the top and bottom surfaces of the flat central indentation. In the middle of the bowl, on the top surface of the indentation, stands a long-necked dog-like animal, with blue glass eyes, tall enough to peer over the rim of the bowl; around it are arranged four small projecting animal heads. Semi-precious stones are also mounted inside the bowl. Equally spaced around the rim are four animal heads as the tops of loop escutcheons that extend down the sides of the bowl, held on with rivets and decorated with millefiori panels, terminating with small projecting human heads below the bowl. The loop escutcheons would allow the bowl to be suspended. There is a deep groove around the outside of the bowl, below the rim. The bowl may have been used to contain water, but, like other hanging bowls, its intended function is not certainly known. It has been compared to the 8th century Ormside bowl. The filigree decoration resembles the Kirkoswald brooch and the blue glass recalls the Ardagh Chalice. The choice of material is unusual: almost all other hanging bowls are bronze.

Other Anglo-Saxon articles have been found in the River Witham, including pins. The bowl may have been deposited in the river from a causeway, as a votive offering.

The current location of the bowl is unknown. It may have been sold by Christie's in the 1920s, as part of the sale of a collection. It is known from full-scale colour-tinted drawings held by the Society of Antiquaries of London.
