= Ormside bowl =

Anglo-Saxon bowl found in a burial in Ormside, Cumbria

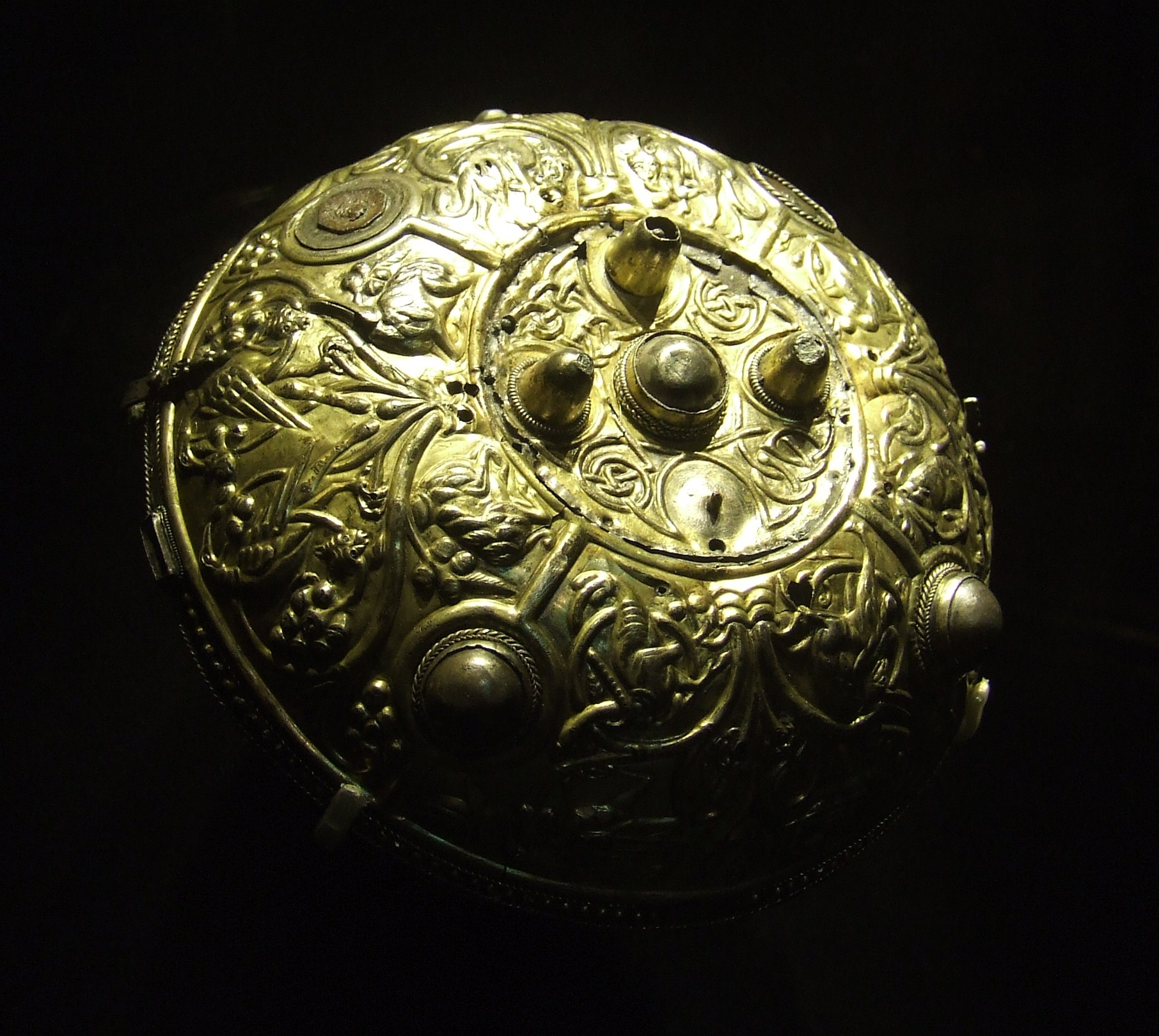
- The base of the Ormside bowl
- Material: Silver, bronze, and glass
- Height: 45 millimetres (1.8 in)
- Width: Diameter 138 millimetres (5.4 in)
- Created: AD 750–800
- Discovered: 1823, Great Ormside, Cumbria
- Present location: Yorkshire Museum
- Registration: York Museums Trust - YORYM : 1990.35

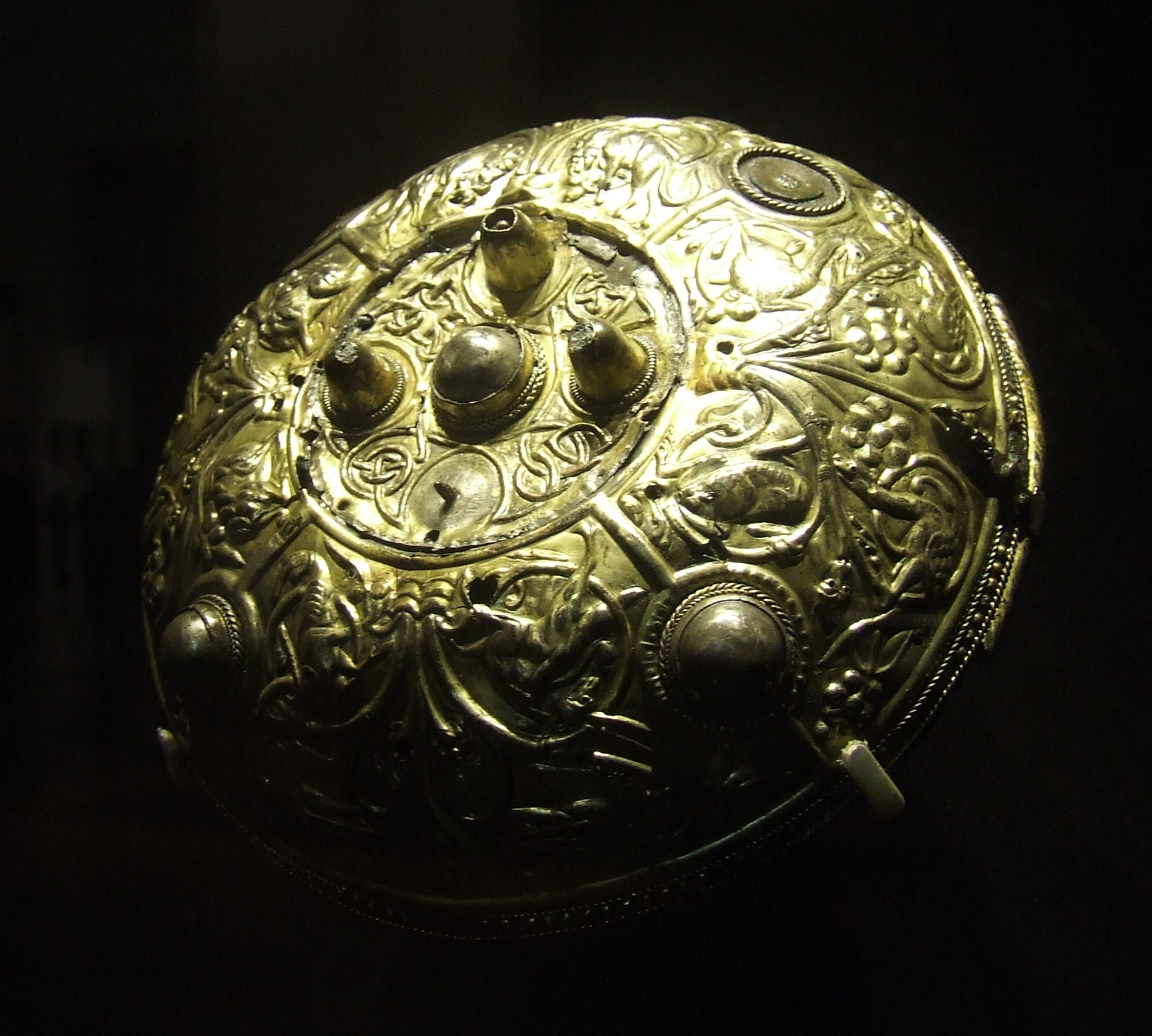
Another view

The Ormside Bowl is an Anglo-Saxon double-bowl in gilded silver and bronze, with glass, perhaps Northumbrian, dating from the mid-8th century which was found in 1823, possibly buried next to a Viking warrior in Great Ormside, Cumbria, though the circumstances of the find were not well recorded. If so, the bowl was probably looted from York by the warrior before being buried with him on his death. The bowl is one of the finest pieces of Anglo-Saxon silverwork found in England.

== Description ==
The bowl is a double-shelled cup made from 2 pieces riveted together with dome-headed rivets and beaded collars. The surface of the bowl is decorated with a chased repousse technique. Sometime after it was originally made the bowl was converted into a drinking vessel.

=== Inner bowl ===
The inner cup is made from gilt-bronze and is riveted with studs of blue glass and silver. The base plate of the internal bowl features 16 circular pieces of glass within a ring of cloisons and five further rivets, of which the central is missing. The gilding on the bowl was added after the other decoration. The inner bowl could have been made in York as a blue-glass stud matching the bowl's was found there.

=== Outer bowl ===
The outer shell is made from silver-gilt, the rim once had a U-sectioned strip of ungilded silver although this has now mostly been lost. This strip was originally attached using 4 clips in the shape of animal heads although 2 of these have also been lost. The bowl's gilt-silver exterior is decorated with Anglo-Saxon style interlaced fantastic creatures amid Continental style vines, the frontal gaze of some of the creatures on the bowl is a common occurrence in carvings of this type. These decorations show plants, grapes, fruit, animals and birds in both naturalistic and grotesque style. Another beaded band is riveted on in four places outside the rim. These rivets have square mountings, in one of which a piece of blue glass survives. The external base plate features five domed rivets. The interlaced cruciform decoration between these rivets has been made using a repoussé technique. The bowl may also once have had a footring made from gilded wire.

=== Comparisons ===
The Ormside bowl is similar in aspects of its style to several bowls from the St Ninian's Isle Treasure but is closer in style to the Witham bowl, a lost early eighth century hanging-bowl found in the River Witham. The decoration on the bowl has been compared to the St Petersburg Bede, Barberini Gospels, Gandersheim Casket and Rupertus Cross. The conical bosses on the base of the bowl resemble features of the Kildalton Cross.

The embossed and fine-lined filigreed designs on the bowl have been compared to those of the Wye Down pendant and the Book of Durrow leading to it being dated in 1958 by G. Haseloff to 650–700, though this now seems too early.

== Discovery ==
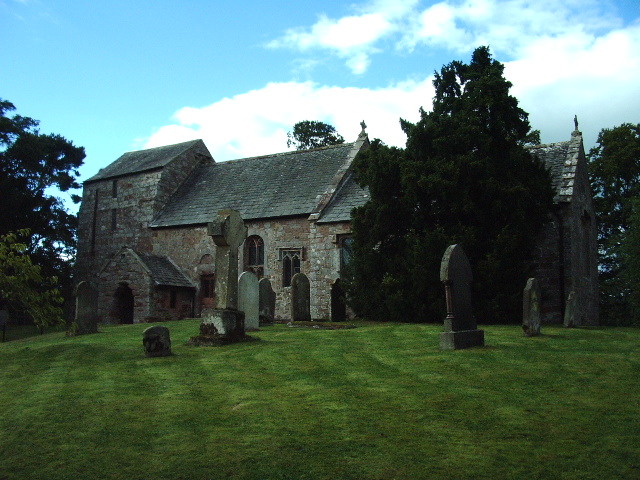
St James' Church in Great Ormside

The bowl was found buried in 1823 in what is now St James' Churchyard in Great Ormside. The bowl was amongst the first objects donated to the Yorkshire Philosophical Society in 1823, before the construction of the Yorkshire Museum in 1829-30. It latterly formed part of the permanent collection of the museum. In 1898 the burial of a Viking warrior was found in the same churchyard. This burial, including a sword, is now in the Tullie House Museum and Art Gallery in Carlisle where it forms an important part of their early medieval collection. David M. Wilson does not consider the bowl to have actually been buried with the Viking warrior, and instead assumes it was really found inside the church, as he considers the bowl to be too fragile to have survived burying.

== Public display ==
In 1951 the bowl was cleaned and treated in the laboratory of the British Museum, including the removal of a silver patch so that all of the metalworking detail could be seen. It was then exhibited at the York Festival before returning briefly for exhibition in the British Museum in 1952.

It was on display in the 1980s as the centerpiece of the Anglo-Saxon gallery, surrounded by swords and sculptures.

The bowl was temporarily displayed again in the British Museum in 2010. This was the first time a regional museum has shown its collection at the British Museum and Margaret Hodge the Minister of State, Department for Culture, Media and Sport encouraged everybody to view the exhibit. It returned to the Yorkshire Museum for its reopening on Yorkshire Day of the same year after a £2m refurbishment of the galleries.

From 2017 the bowl formed part of a touring exhibition titled 'Viking: Rediscover the Legend' and was displayed alongside the Bedale Hoard, the Vale of York hoard and the Cuerdale hoard, with the tour starting at the Yorkshire Museum in May 2017 with subsequent displays at the Atkinson Art Gallery and Library in Southport, Aberdeen Art Gallery, Norwich Castle Museum, and the University of Nottingham.

The bowl went back on display at the Yorkshire Museum in September 2019.

There is also a small exhibition about the bowl in St James' Church in Great Ormside.
