= Ormside =

Civil parish in Cumbria, England

Coordinates: 54.552°N 2.458°W

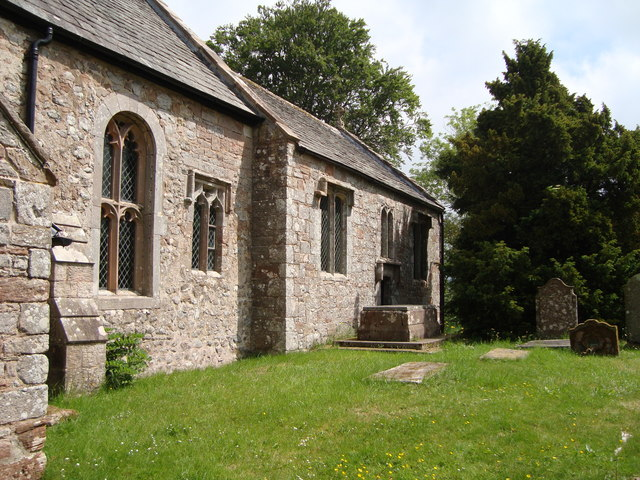
- Church of St James, Great Ormside

- Location within Cumbria
- Population: 167 (2011)
- OS grid reference: NY7017
- Civil parish: Ormside
- Unitary authority: Westmorland and Furness
- Ceremonial county: Cumbria
- Region: North West
- Country: England
- Sovereign state: United Kingdom
- Post town: APPLEBY IN WESTMORLAND
- Postcode district: CA16
- Dialling code: 01768
- Police: Cumbria
- Fire: Cumbria
- Ambulance: North West
- UK Parliament: Westmorland and Lonsdale

Ormside is a civil parish in Westmorland and Furness, Cumbria, England, which includes the village of Great Ormside and the hamlet of Little Ormside. It had a population of 133 in 2001, increasing to 167 at the 2011 Census.

In the west of the parish, where the Hoff Beck forms its boundary with the parish of Hoff is Rutter Force, a 30-foot (9.1 m) high waterfall.

== See also ==
- Listed buildings in Ormside
- Ormside railway station
- Ormside bowl
