= Escutcheon =

Escutcheon may refer to:

- Escutcheon (heraldry), a shield or shield-shaped emblem, displaying a coat of arms
- Escutcheon (furniture), a metal plate that surrounds a keyhole or lock cylinder on a door
- Escutcheon, the pattern of growth of pubic hair
- Escutcheon, decorated discs supporting the handles/hooks on hanging bowls
