= Great Ormside =

Village in Cumbria, England

Coordinates: 54.550°N 2.463°W

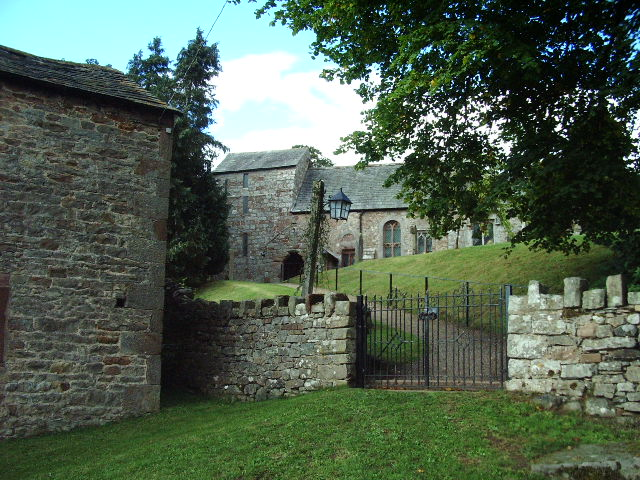
- St James Church in Ormside

- Location in Eden, Cumbria Location within Cumbria
- OS grid reference: NY700173
- Civil parish: Ormside
- Unitary authority: Westmorland and Furness
- Ceremonial county: Cumbria
- Region: North West
- Country: England
- Sovereign state: United Kingdom
- Post town: APPLEBY-IN-WESTMORLAND
- Postcode district: CA16
- Dialling code: 017683
- Police: Cumbria
- Fire: Cumbria
- Ambulance: North West
- UK Parliament: Westmorland and Lonsdale

Great Ormside is a small village in the parish of Ormside, in the Westmorland and Furness district, in the English county of Cumbria. It is a few miles away from the small town of Appleby-in-Westmorland. It is near the River Eden. There is also the smaller neighbouring hamlet of Little Ormside. It also has a church called St. James's Church.

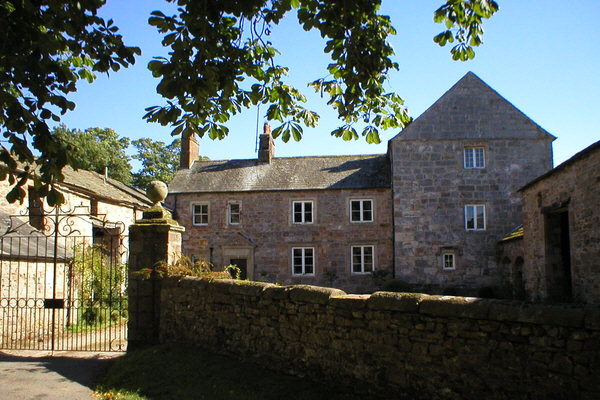
Ormside Hall

Close to the church in Great Ormside is Ormside Hall, 17th-century house which incorporates the remains of a late 14th- or early 15th-century tower house.

== See also ==
- Listed buildings in Ormside
- Ormside bowl
