= Little Ormside =

Hamlet in Cumbria, England

Coordinates: 54.544°N 2.451°W

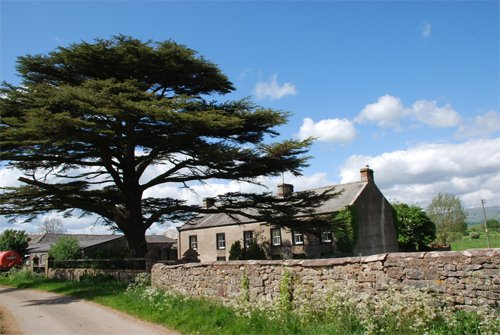
- Cedar of Lebanon - the tree, standing in the garden of Ormside lodge, was said to have been brought back from the Lebanon by General Whitehead. He supposedly grew the sapling in his hat during the long sea voyage back to England, sharing his daily ration of water with it

- Location in Eden, Cumbria Location within Cumbria
- OS grid reference: NY708166
- Civil parish: Ormside
- Unitary authority: Westmorland and Furness
- Ceremonial county: Cumbria
- Region: North West
- Country: England
- Sovereign state: United Kingdom
- Post town: APPLEBY-IN-WESTMORLAND
- Postcode district: CA16
- Dialling code: 017683
- Police: Cumbria
- Fire: Cumbria
- Ambulance: North West
- UK Parliament: Westmorland and Lonsdale

Little Ormside is a hamlet in the parish of Ormside, in the Westmorland and Furness District, in the English county of Cumbria.

== Location ==
It is a few miles away from the small town of Appleby-in-Westmorland. It is near the River Eden. There is also the larger neighbouring village of Great Ormside.

== See also ==
- Listed buildings in Ormside
