= Crosby Garrett railway station =

Former railway station in Cumbria, England

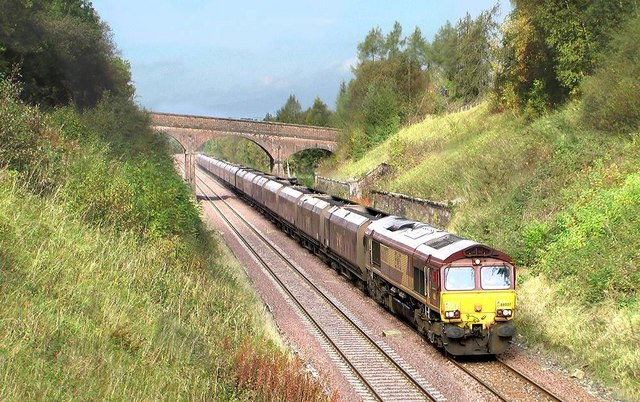
- The site of Crosby Garrett station

General information
- Location: Crosby Garrett, Westmorland and Furness; England
- Coordinates: 54.4825°N 2.4245°W
- Grid reference: NY725098
- Platforms: 2

Other information
- Status: Disused

History
- Original company: Midland Railway
- Post-grouping: London Midland and Scottish Railway

Key dates
- 1 May 1876: Opened
- 6 October 1952: Closed
Location

Crosby Garrett was a railway station which served the village of Crosby Garrett in Cumbria, England. It was situated on the Settle-Carlisle Line 38 1/4 miles (61.6 km) south of Carlisle. The station was built by the Midland Railway and opened in 1876. It was closed by the British Transport Commission as an economy measure in 1952.

== History ==
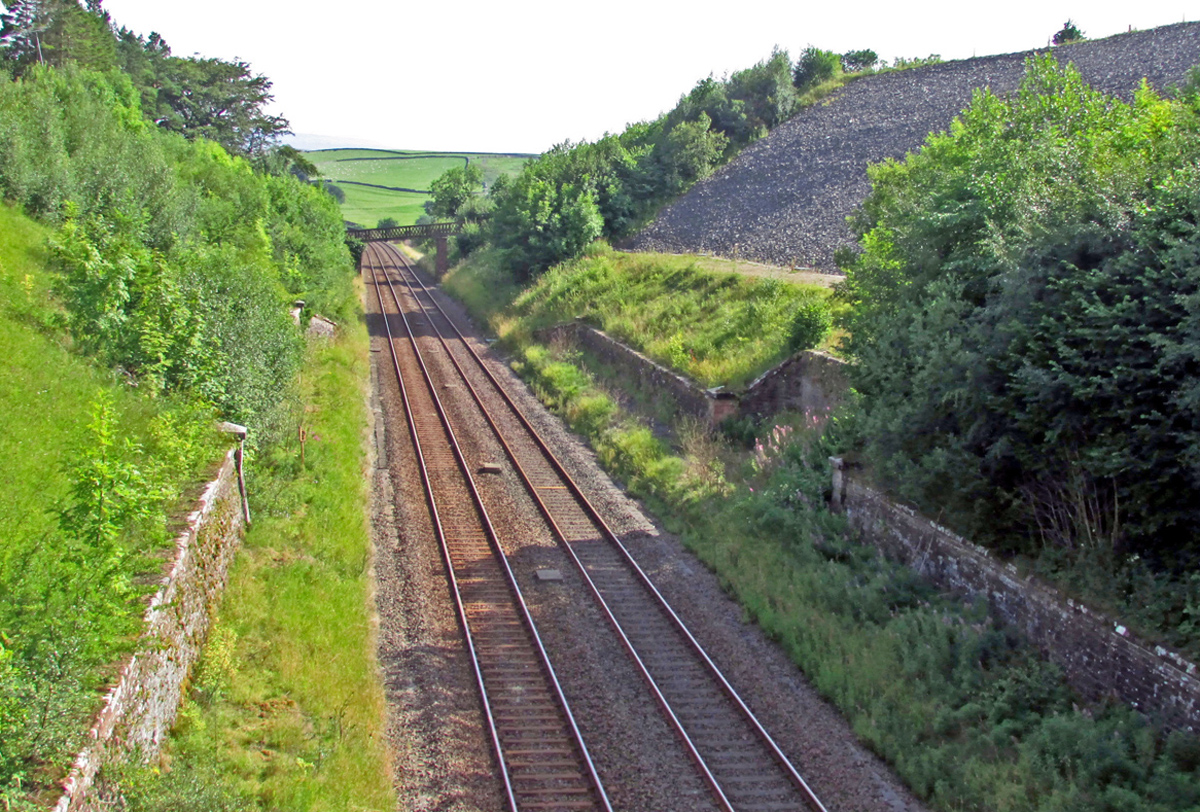
The site of the station looking south in 2016

The station platforms were set into the cutting needing substantial protective retaining walls, as can be seen in the adjacent photographs. The station master's house still exists as a private dwelling near the overbridge, whilst the overgrown platforms have also survived and can be seen from passing trains. The nearby Crosby Garrett Tunnel is 181 yards (166 m) in length. The Crosby Garrett viaduct near the edge of the village has six arches, and is 55 feet (17 m) high and 110 yards (100 m) long.

On 15 January 1999 at circa 19:50, the 17:12 Northern Spirit passenger train from Huddersfield to Carlisle collided with a landslip at Crosby Garrett tunnel and derailed, blocking the adjacent line. The driver, aware that another train was approaching on this line, followed laid down procedures and was able to warn the oncoming English, Welsh and Scottish Railway (EW&SR) coal train by using a warning light and placing a track detonator. The freight train driver slowed his train but was not able to prevent it running into the derailed passenger train, which was consequently pushed back about 300 feet (90 m) into the tunnel. The train crew required hospital treatment but none of the 22 passengers were injured. The passengers were taken to the nearby village and were assisted by the villagers, resulting in a donation being made to the community by Northern Spirit.

The following photographs are taken from an old scrapbook kept by the wife of David Reynolds, station master at Crosby Garrett from about 1900 to about 1925. The photos were taken about 1910.

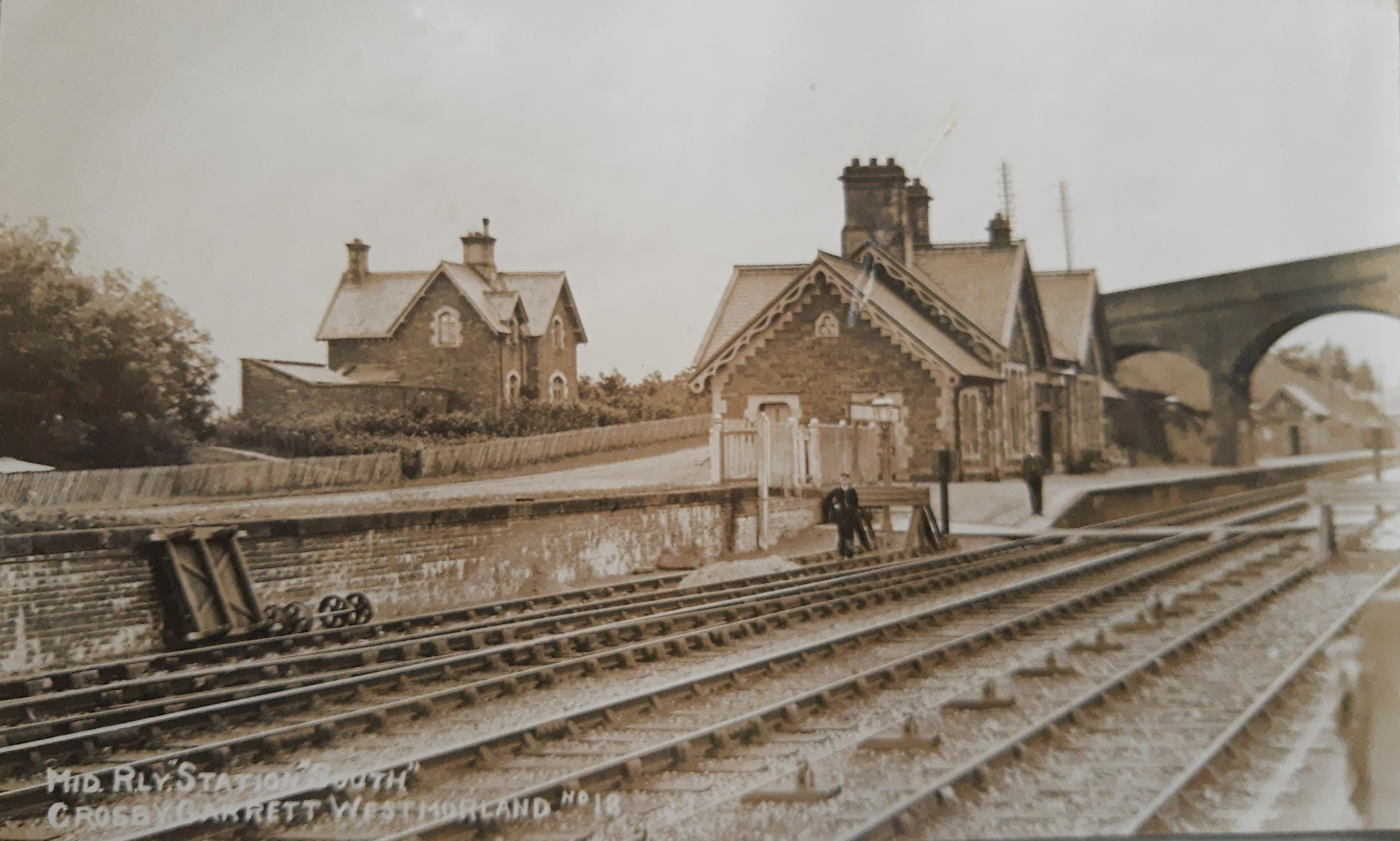

Top photo: the men in the photo may be David Reynolds, station master, and his son John, a porter.

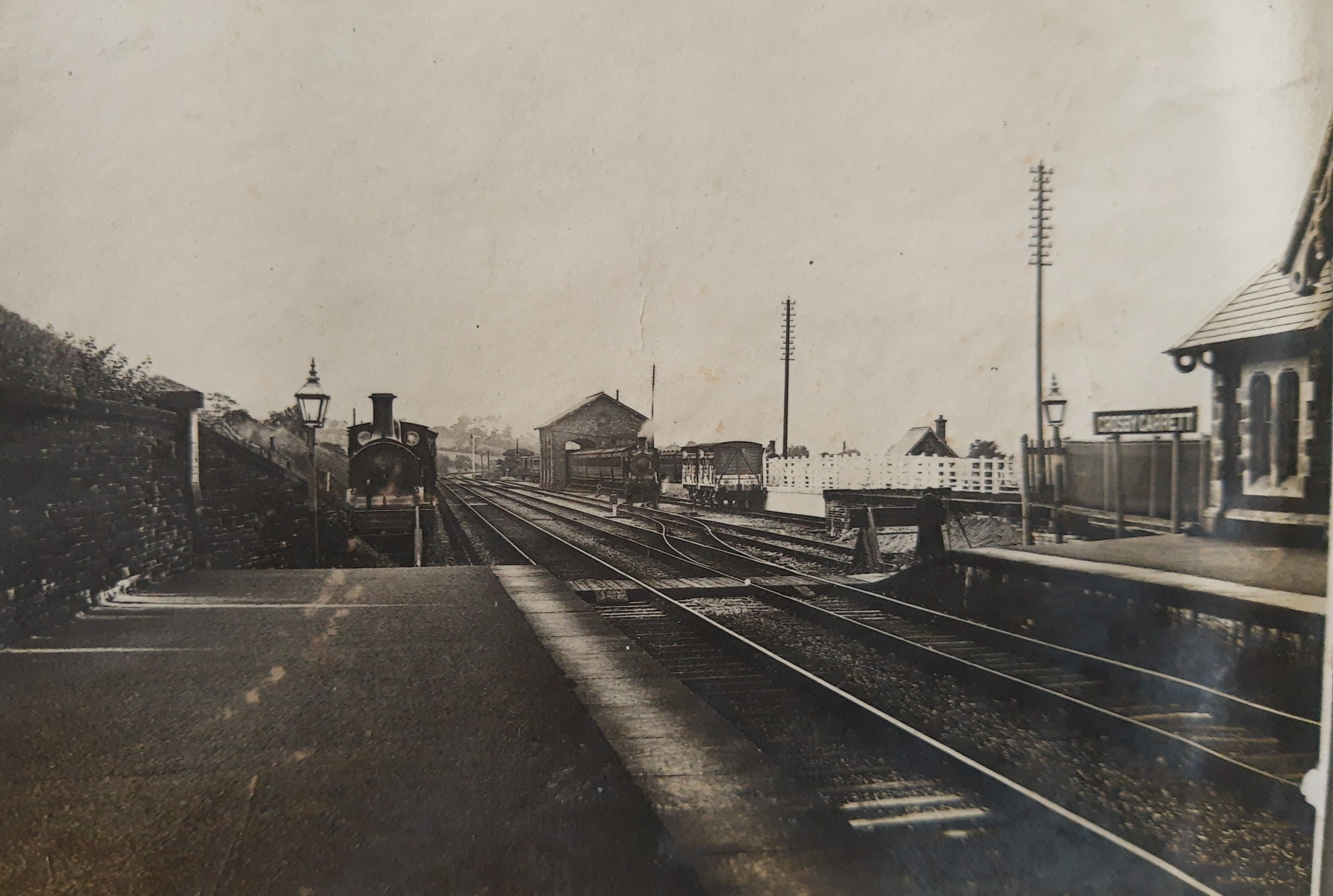
Another view of the station and rail lines.

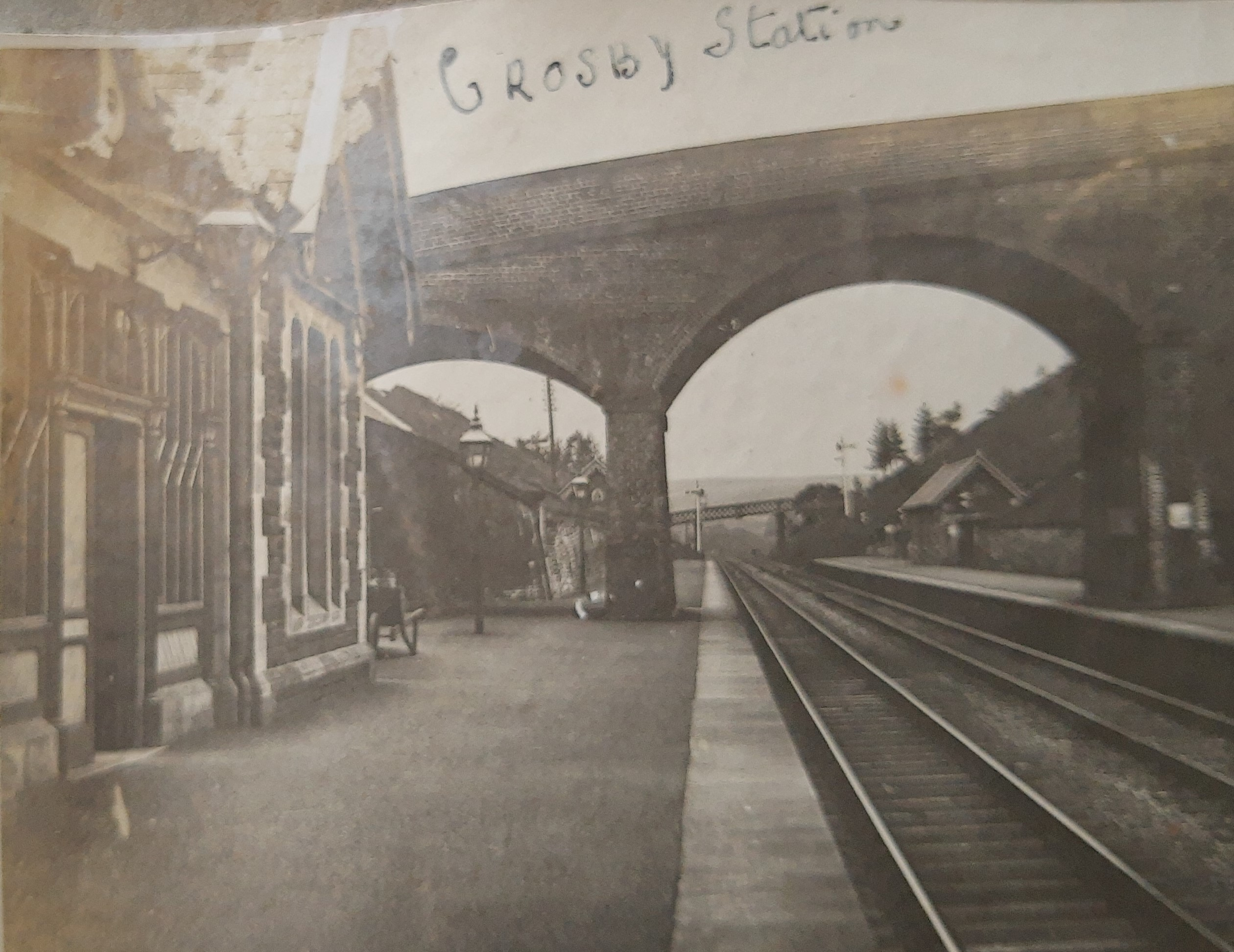
Another view, circa 1910

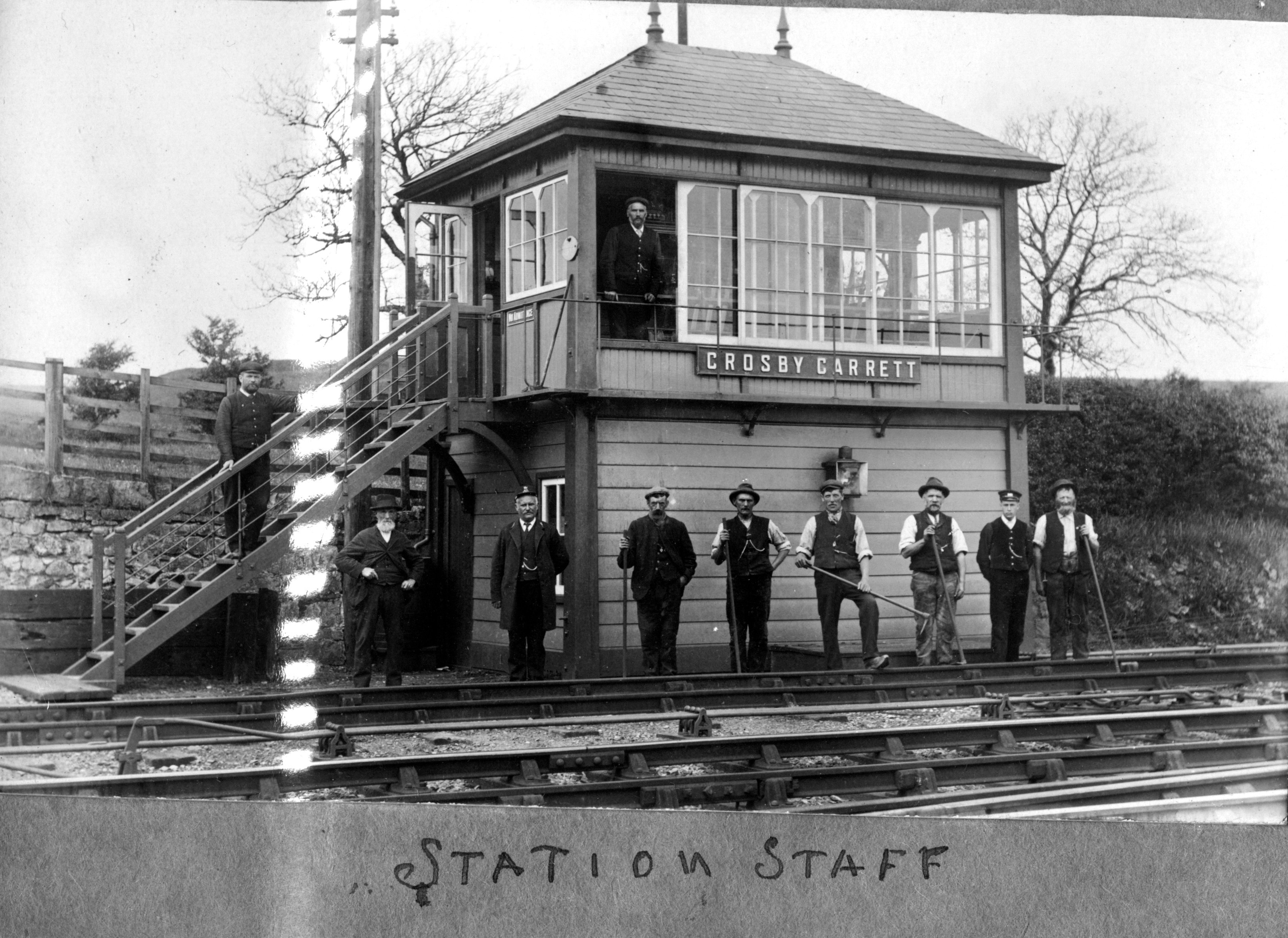
The staff of the Crosby Garrett station c.1910.

Bottom photo: The second man from the left in the front line is station master David Reynolds. The second man from the right is his son John Reynolds, a station porter. Based on the 1911 census of Crosby Garrett, other men in the photo may be Robert Balmer, foreman, Amos Whitaker, John Lawson or Tom Sismey, signalmen, and James Haygarth, Alfred Johnson, John W. Richardson, Thomas Davison, or Christopher Thomas Foster, plate layers.

Preceding station	Historical railways	Following station
Ormside	Midland Railway; Settle-Carlisle Railway	Kirkby Stephen West
