= St James' Church, Great Ormside =

Coordinates: 54.5532°N 2.4632°W

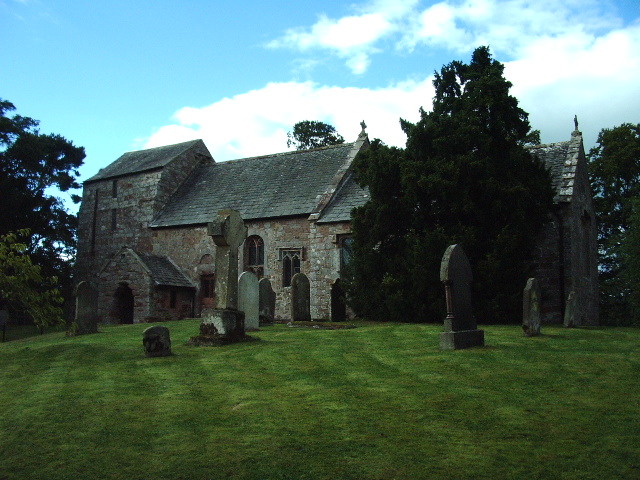
- St James' Church, Great Ormside, from the southeast

- Location in Cumbria
- OS grid reference: NY 701 177
- Location: Great Ormside, Cumbria
- Country: England
- Denomination: Anglican
- Website: St James, Ormside

History
- Status: Parish church

Architecture
- Functional status: Active
- Heritage designation: Grade I
- Designated: 12 April 1984
- Architect: C. J. Ferguson (restoration)
- Architectural type: Church
- Style: Norman

Specifications
- Materials: Sandstone

Administration
- Province: York
- Diocese: Carlisle
- Archdeaconry: Carlisle
- Deanery: Appleby
- Parish: Ormside

Clergy
- Rector: Revd Andrew Burrell

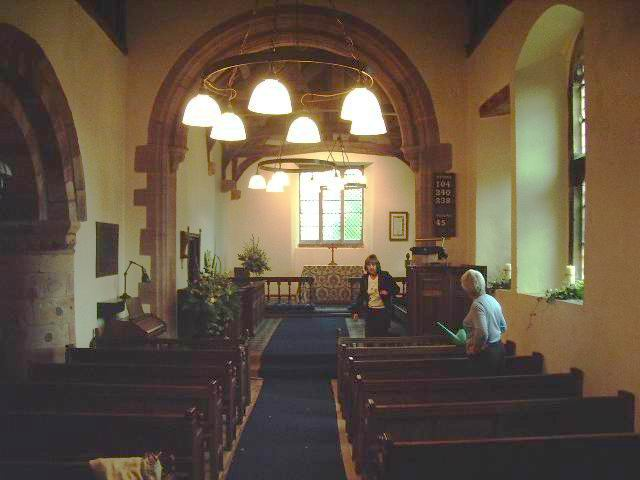
Interior of the church in 2006

St James' Church is in the village of Great Ormside, Cumbria, England. It is an active Anglican parish church in the deanery of Appleby, the archdeaconry of Carlisle, and the diocese of Carlisle. The parish is united with nine other parishes and thirteen places of worship to form the Heart of Eden benefice. The church is recorded in the National Heritage List for England as a designated Grade I listed building. It stands on top of a circular mound overlooking the River Eden.

== History ==
The mound on which the church stands was a sacred site before the coming of Christianity, and was used as a burial place by the Vikings. The date of the first Christian church on the site is unknown, but the nave of the present church dates from the late 11th century. A north aisle was added and the chancel was widened in about the middle of the 12th century. The west tower was built in the following century. (Note: For the tower, Hyde and Pevsner in the Buildings of England series suggest a date of about 1200.) In the early 16th century the chancel was further enlarged, making it wider than the nave. The Hilton chapel was built in 1723, replacing the former north aisle. The church was restored in 1885–86 by C. J. Ferguson at a cost of £732 (equivalent to £80,000 in 2025). During the restoration the north arcade was rebuilt, tracery was installed in the windows of the Hilton Chapel, and a new south doorway and porch were added to the west of the original doorway. In 1893 the tower was re-roofed.

== Architecture ==
=== Exterior ===
The church is constructed in sandstone rubble. The roofs are slated on the south side, and covered in stone flags on the north. Its plan consists of a nave with a porch to the south and the Hilton Chapel to the north, a chancel wider than the nave, a north vestry, and a west tower. The nave measures 30 feet (9.1 m) by 16 feet (4.9 m), and the chancel 26 feet 6 inches (8.1 m) by 17 feet 3 inches (5.3 m). The tower is about 11 feet (3.4 m) square. The basic architectural style is Norman. The tower is in three stages, with large angular buttresses. It is defensive in nature, with no external doorway, three tiers of narrow lancet windows on the west and south sides, and without windows on the north side. The height of the tower has been reduced, with a few corbels of the former parapet remaining. It is surmounted by a pitched roof. On the south side of the church is a gabled porch, to the east of which is the original doorway, now partly blocked and with an inserted window. The original doorway is tall and narrow, with a round-arched head, and a blank tympanum. To the right of this are a round-headed window and a 14th-century two-light mullioned window. In the south wall of the chancel are three windows, with a doorway below the central window. The east window has three lights. The windows in the Hilton Chapel are round-headed.

=== Interior ===
Inside the church is a tall, narrow, round-headed doorway leading into the tower, and an upper doorway, the latter being another defensive feature. Inside the tower is a basement and two internal floors. It contains two bells, but only one can be used. Between the nave and the chapel is a two-bay Norman arcade with round arches. In the chapel is a coat of arms dated 1723. In the north wall between the chapel and the chancel is a 14th-century hagioscope. The south wall of the chancel contains a combined aumbry and piscina in two recesses with semicircular heads. The font is Norman, and consists of a square bowl on a 19th-century base.

== Churchyard ==
In 1823 the Ormside bowl was discovered in the churchyard. This is an Anglo-Saxon bowl dating from the 7th or 8th century, and now held in the Yorkshire Museum. A further discovery was made in 1898, this being the burial of a Viking warrior and his sword. The sword is held in the Tullie House Museum in Carlisle. In the churchyard is the socket for a cross dated 1643. A new cross was added in 1897 to celebrate Queen Victoria's Diamond Jubilee. The cross and the socket are listed at Grade II.

== See also ==
- Grade I listed churches in Cumbria
- Grade I listed buildings in Cumbria
- Listed buildings in Ormside

== Notes and references ==
Notes

Citations
