= Listed buildings in Ormside =

Ormside is a civil parish in Westmorland and Furness, Cumbria, England. It contains nine listed buildings that are recorded in the National Heritage List for England. Of these, one is listed at Grade I, the highest of the three grades.Another one is at Grade II*, the middle grade, and the others are at Grade II, the lowest grade. The parish contains the villages of Great Ormside and Little Ormside, and is otherwise rural. The most important buildings are an 11th-century church and a 14th-century hall; both of these and structures associated with them are listed. The other listed buildings are a house, farmhouses and farm buildings.

== Key ==
Grade	Criteria
I	Buildings of exceptional interest, sometimes considered to be internationally important
II*	Particularly important buildings of more than special interest
II	Buildings of national importance and special interest

== Buildings ==
Name and location	Photograph	Date	Notes	Grade
St James' Church; 54.55315°N 2.46315°W		Late 11th century	The oldest parts of the church are the nave and the chancel, the tower dates from about 1200, the chancel was extended in the early 16th century, the Hilton Chapel was built in 1723, replacing the north aisle, and the south porch was added in the 19th century. The church is built in stone with roofs partly stone-flagged, and partly in slate with stone coping and apex crosses. The west tower has three stepped stages and massive angle buttresses, it contains three tiers of narrow lancet windows, and has a gabled roof.	I
Roadside Preaching Cross; 54.55198°N 2.46357°W		Late medieval	This is the base of a former roadside preaching cross, consisting of five steps constructed in large stone blocks. The rest of it was destroyed during the Commonwealth and replaced by a sycamore sapling, which has since grown into a mature tree.	II
Ormside Hall and barns 54.55266°N 2.46246°W		Late 14th to early 15th century	The oldest part of the hall is the south wing, the main hall range being rebuilt in the 17th century. The hall is built in sandstone with quoins and has slate roofs. The south wing has three storeys and contains mullioned windows with hood moulds and some with traceried heads. The hall range has two storeys and four bays, and also has mullioned windows. The doorway has an architrave with a projecting keystone and a pediment. There is a single-storey kitchen range with dormers. To the north is a range of outbuildings, including a barn with a stone-flagged roof, loft doors and large wagon entrances.	II*
Churchyard cross 54.55301°N 2.46303°W	—	1643	The base consists of a slab surmounted by a large stone block. On it is a Celtic cross dated 1897.	II
Gate piers, Ormside Hall; 54.55282°N 2.46277°W	—	17th century	The gate piers are large, in stone, rusticated, and have cornices and ball finials.	II
Bromleygreen Farmhouse and barns 54.54922°N 2.46238°W	—	Before 1687	The farmhouse and outbuildings are in stone on a plinth, with quoins and slate roofs. The farmhouse has two storeys, five bays and an outshut and gabled extensions at the rear. There is a central door with a fanlight, sash windows, a blocked mullioned window, a fire window, and a continuous hood mould. To the left is a barn that has a doorway with an initialled and dated lintel and a wagon entrance, to the right is an 18th-century extension with a segmental-headed wagon door, and at right angles to that are later extensions.	II
Catherine Holme Farmhouse and barns 54.52958°N 2.48816°W	—	Early 18th century (possible)	The farmhouse was remodelled in the early 19th century, it is in rendered stone with a slate roof. There are two storeys and three bays. The central doorway and the sash windows have stone surrounds, and there is a round-headed stair window at the rear. To the east is a barn at right angles, it is in stone with quoins, and has a slate roof. The barn contains two doors, one with a re-used dated and initialled lintel, loft doors and a wagon entrance, all with segmental heads.	II
Threshing barn, Ormside Hall; 54.55271°N 2.46289°W	—	Late 18th to early 19th century	The barn is in stone with quoins and a slate roof. It contains two wagon doors, one with a segmental head, a byre door and a loft door. The barn is attached to the house by an arcaded structure with three arches carried on square piers with imposts.	II
Old Rectory; 54.55056°N 2.46019°W	—	Late 18th to early 19th century	A rendered house on a deep stone plinth with a Welsh slate roof. There are two storeys with a cellar, and a symmetrical three-bay front. Steps lead up to a central door with a fanlight, and the windows are sashes. At the rear there are four bays, a bridge leading up to a door, and a ramp from it to an external walkway.	II
