= Andrew O'Dell =

Scottish geographer and antiquarian

Andrew O'Dell FRSE FRGS FRSGS
- Born: 4 June 1909; Luipardsvlei, Transvaal Colony
- Died: 17 June 1966 (aged 57)
- Spouse: Queenie Louise Smith

Academic background
- Education: King's College London

Andrew Charles O'Dell FRSE FRGS FRSGS (4 June 1909 – 17 June 1966) was a Scottish geographer and antiquarian. A keen railway enthusiast, he left a large collection of railway memorabilia to Aberdeen University, known as the O'Dell Collection. He was joint founder of the Institute of British Geographers in 1933.

He was best known to the general public for his involvement in the discovery of the St Ninian's Isle Treasure in Shetland, in 1959.

== Life ==
He was born on 4 June 1909 in Luipardsvlei in the Transvaal Colony, the son of Charles O'Dell. His mother was from the Scottish Borders. He was educated at Westminster City School in London. He then studied geography at King's College London. From 1945 he was Head of the Department Geography at Aberdeen University.

In 1951 he was elected a Fellow of the Royal Society of Edinburgh. His proposers were Alan Grant Ogilvie, John Baird Simpson, James Robert Matthews and Henry Marshall Steven.

He died suddenly on 17 June 1966. A memorial garden to him exists in the north quadrangle of King's College, Aberdeen.

== Family ==
In 1938 he married Queenie Louise Smith.

== Publications ==
- The Scandinavian World (1958)
- Geography: Our Earth and Its Peoples (1967)
- Railways and Geography (1971)
- The Railways of Scotland
