= Ormside railway station =

Former railway station in Cumbria, England

Coordinates: 54.5478°N 2.4672°W

Ormside
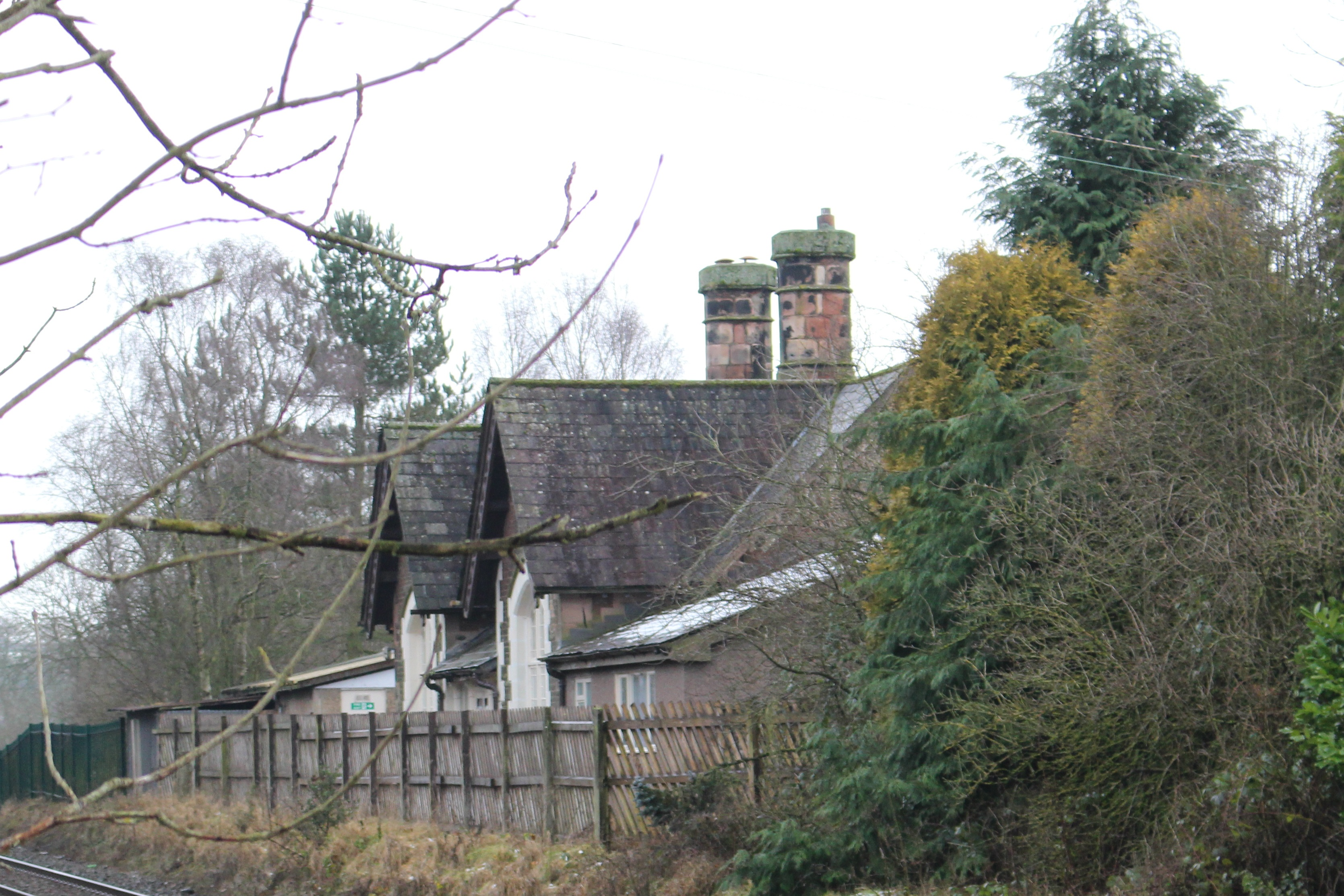

General information
- Location: Ormside, Westmorland and Furness; England
- Grid reference: NY698170
- Platforms: 2

Other information
- Status: Disused

Key dates
- 1876: Station opens
- 1907: Signal box into use
- 1952: Station closed
- 1960: Signal box closed
Location

Ormside railway station was a station at Ormside, England, on the Midland Railway Settle-Carlisle Line. It was located 33 1/4 miles (53.5 km) south of Carlisle.

== Station ==
Original proposals suggested a Station at Asby, the next parish south of Ormside. Later representation from local landowners resulted in the site being moved to this location. It was closed by the British Transport Commission on 2 June 1952 and the platforms subsequently demolished - the station building has however survived and is used as an education centre, whilst the line remains in use for both freight and passenger traffic.

== Signal box ==
A signal box was bought into use in 1907. It was 16 feet (4.9 m) by 8 feet (2.4 m), with a 16 lever frame. The box closed on 8 March 1960. Official records imply that from 1886, a frame of 10 levers was worked from the station.

== Notes ==
Preceding station	Historical railways	Following station
Appleby; Line and station open	Midland Railway; Settle and Carlisle line	Crosby Garrett; Line open, station closed
