= Gandersheim Casket =

8th-century Anglo-Saxon chest

The Gandersheim Casket is a small Anglo-Saxon chest from the 8th century, housed in Dankwarderode Castle, a part of the Herzog Anton Ulrich Museum in Braunschweig, Germany.

The panels of the casket are decorated with interlace carvings of animals, plants and abstract shapes. A runic inscription appears on the inner side of the lid. Whilst the inscription is damaged and illegible in parts, it has been translated by Tineke Looijenga and Theo Vennemann as 'I baptise you in the sign of the cross/in the holy name of Christ. I write (on) you the sign of the cross (with) chrism. Sick (men's) oil (in the name of Christ). Holy Oil, chrism, water.' This suggests that the casket may have been used to store holy oil for ecclesiastical purposes.
