= St Ninian's Isle Treasure =

Hoard of silver metalwork discovered in Scotland in 1958

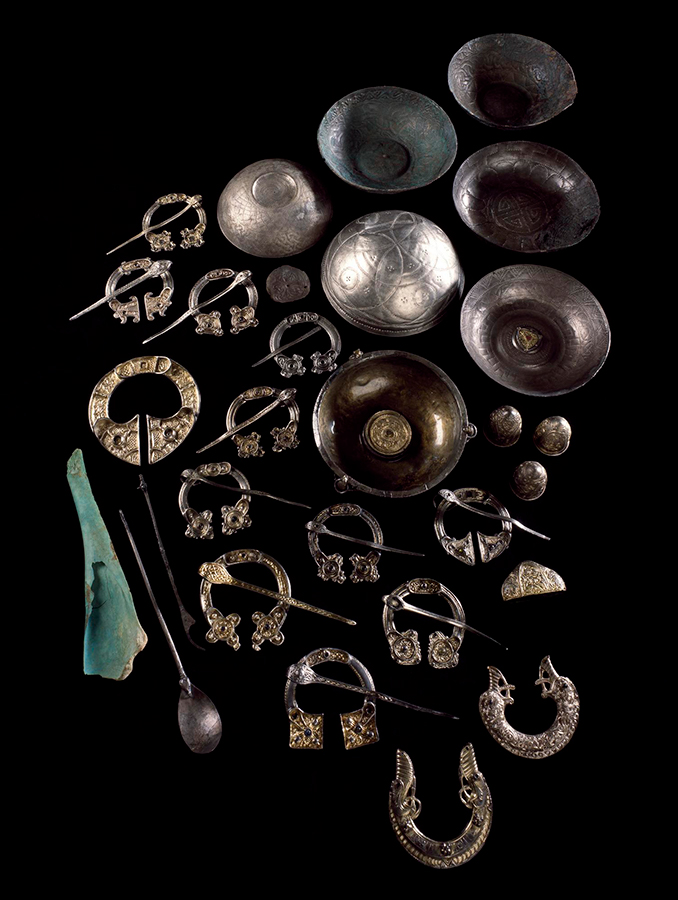
- Early medieval hoard of Pictish silver objects dated c. AD 800 from St Ninian's Isle, Shetland
- Material: Silver, Silver-gilt
- Period/culture: c.750–825 AD
- Discovered: 4 July 1958
- Place: St Ninian's Isle, Shetland, Scotland
- Present location: National Museum of Scotland

The St Ninian's Isle Treasure, found on St Ninian's Isle, Shetland, Scotland, in 1958, is the best example of surviving silver metalwork from the early medieval period in Scotland. The 28-piece hoard includes various silver metalwork items, including twelve pennanular brooches. The treasure is now in the National Museum of Scotland.

== Description ==
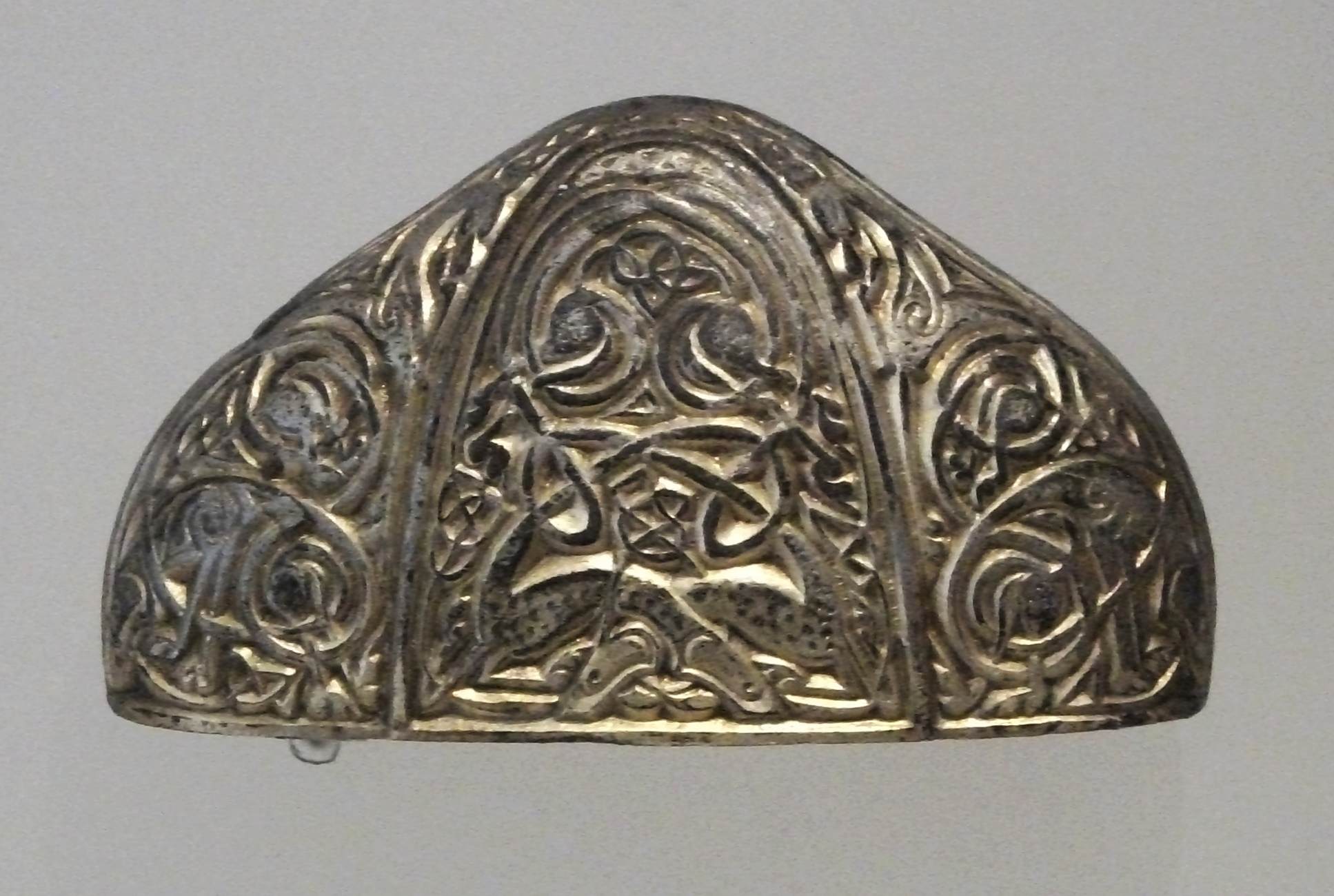
Sword pommel

The hoard consists of 28 silver and silver-gilt objects, dating to the second half of the eighth century. The objects can be grouped into categories relating to feasting, jewellery, and weaponry. There are twelve silver penannular brooches, eight silver bowls (one of which is a hanging bowl, one of only two known silver examples), one silver communion spoon, one silver knife, two silver chapes, one silver pommel, and three silver cones. The only non-silver item is a fragment of a porpoise jawbone. It is thought that some items were secular, such as the penannular brooches and different chapes from sword scabbards. Other pieces, including the bowls, spoon, and cones, may have been used in religious ceremonies or community rituals.

The brooches show a variety of typical Pictish forms, with both animal-head and lobed geometrical forms of terminal. Two of the scabbard chapes and a sword pommel appear to be Anglo-Saxon, probably made in Mercia in the late eighth century; one has an inscription with a prayer in Old English. Gifts were often exchanged between Anglo-Saxon and Pictish rulers, and generally "weapons are among the objects which travelled most widely in the early medieval period".

== History ==
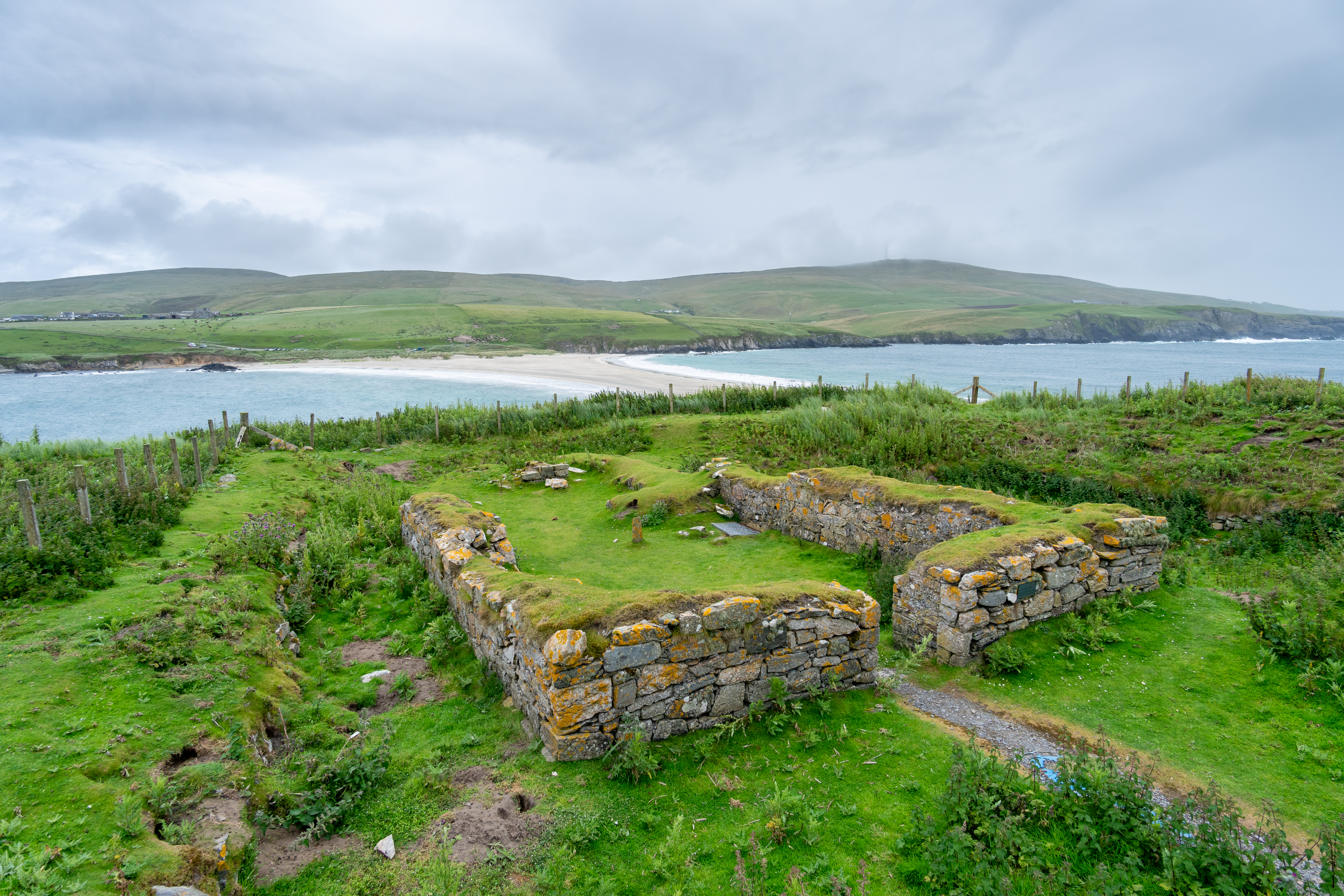
Ruins of St Ninian's chapel, where the treasure was discovered

The hoard was discovered on 4 July 1958 by a schoolboy, Douglas Coutts, during an excavation of a medieval chapel on St Ninian's Isle. Coutts found the treasure in a wooden box, which had been buried under a cross-marked slab. Coutts was helping visiting archaeologists led by Professor Andrew Charles O'Dell of Aberdeen University. It is believed that the treasure was hidden beneath the floor of an earlier church.

Professor O'Dell, writing in December 1959 in Antiquity, recounts that:

"... the church on this site was described early in the 18th century as being still venerated by local people although it had been abandoned at the Reformation in favour of a more central parish church ... ... from the sandy spit, which has formed between the mainland and the isle, gales have carried sand and this, together with the accretion of a graveyard in use until c.1850, buried the church remains and all knowledge of its exact location had vanished from living memory ... At the occasion of the first Viking Congress in 1951 Dr W. Douglas Simpson suggested a search might prove rewarding and this was undertaken in 1955 by a party of my students under my direction. The results in this and succeeding years have exceeded expectations. ... The medieval building with its massive mortared walls, main altar and a side altar had made the excavation noteworthy before 4 July 1958, when the hoard was discovered. Close to the southern chancel arch foundation, and missed by inches by later burials, was found a broken sandstone slab, 10.5 in. by 15 in., lightly inscribed with a cross and, below this, was the hoard. It had been contained in a larch box of which a few splinters, impregnated with metal salts, had escaped decay. The bowls were upside down and the brooches and other objects tangled together, showing it has been hurriedly carried and buried with the top down. In with the objects was the porpoise jawbone and this, the only non-metallic object, is strong evidence of its ecclesiastical connection, although the brooches suggest a secular link ..."

The treasure was allocated to the National Museum of Antiquities of Scotland in 1965–1966 as Treasure Trove, following the case in the Court of Session Lord Advocate v. University of Aberdeen and is now held in the successor National Museum of Scotland in Edinburgh, whilst replicas are held by the Shetland Museum.

== Gallery ==
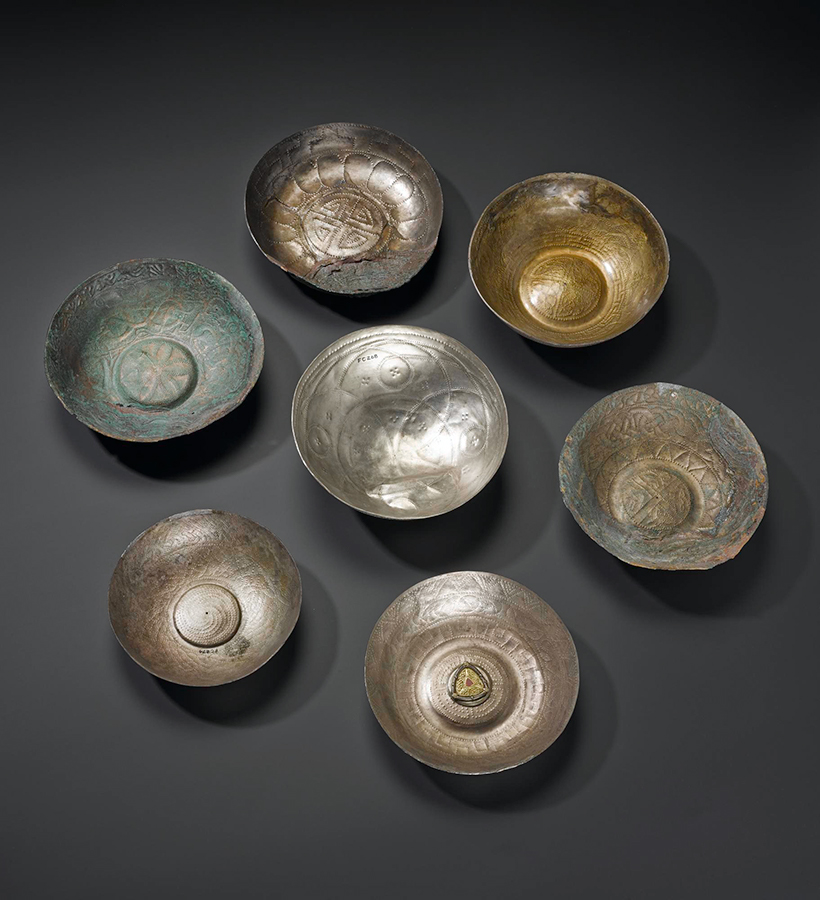
Penannular silver bowls

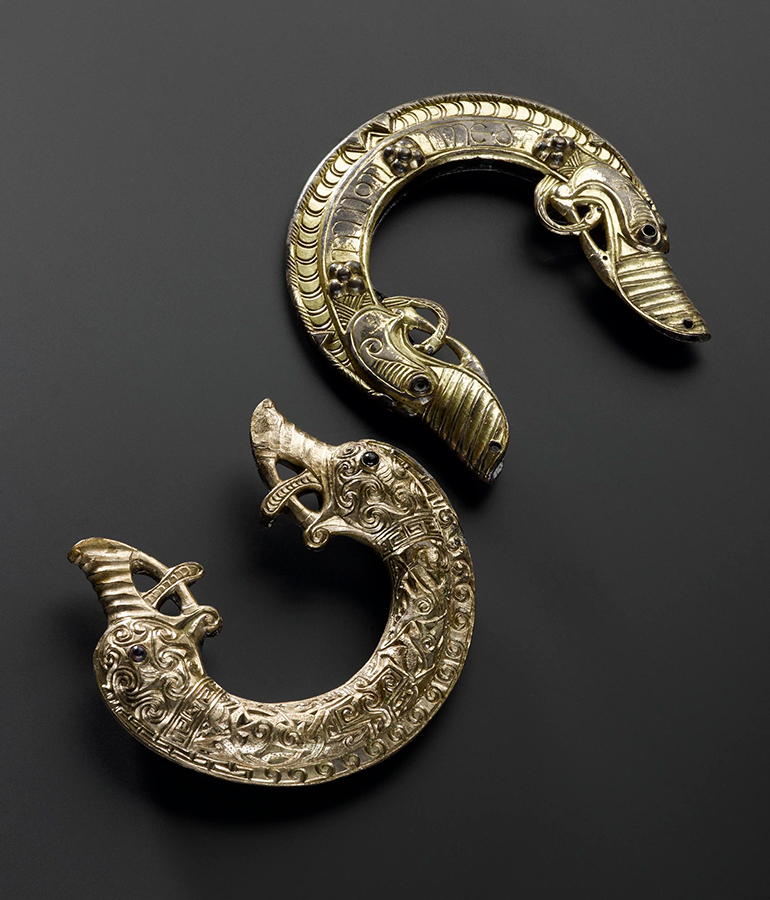
Silver sword scabbard chapes

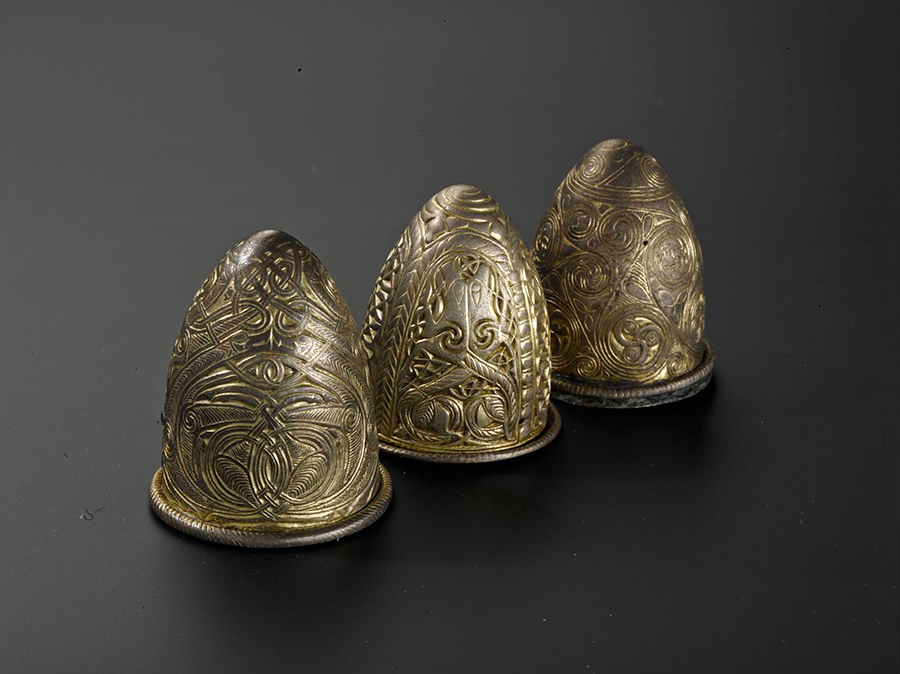
Conical silver mounts

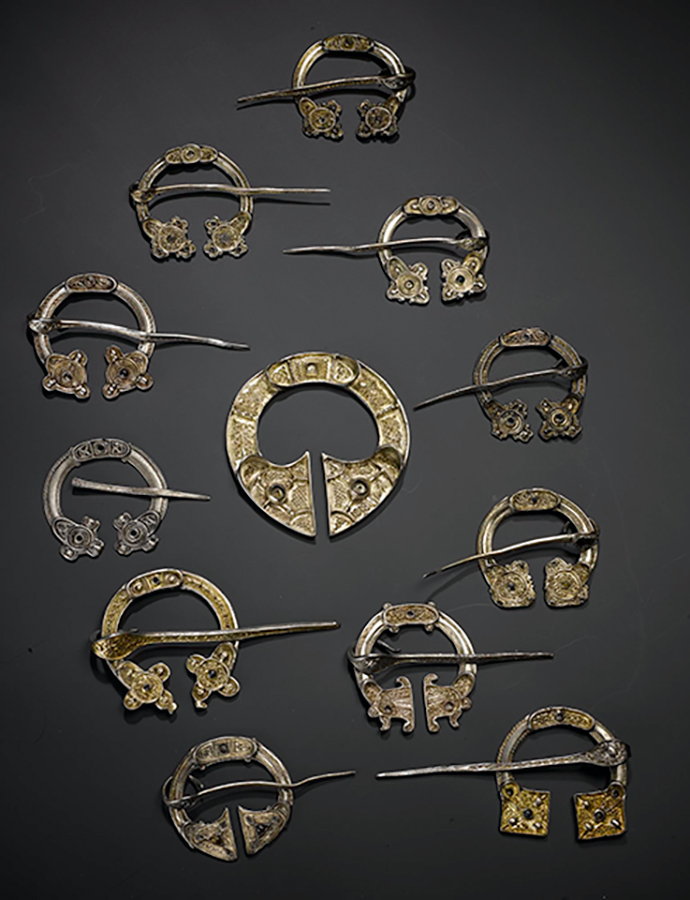
Penannular silver brooches

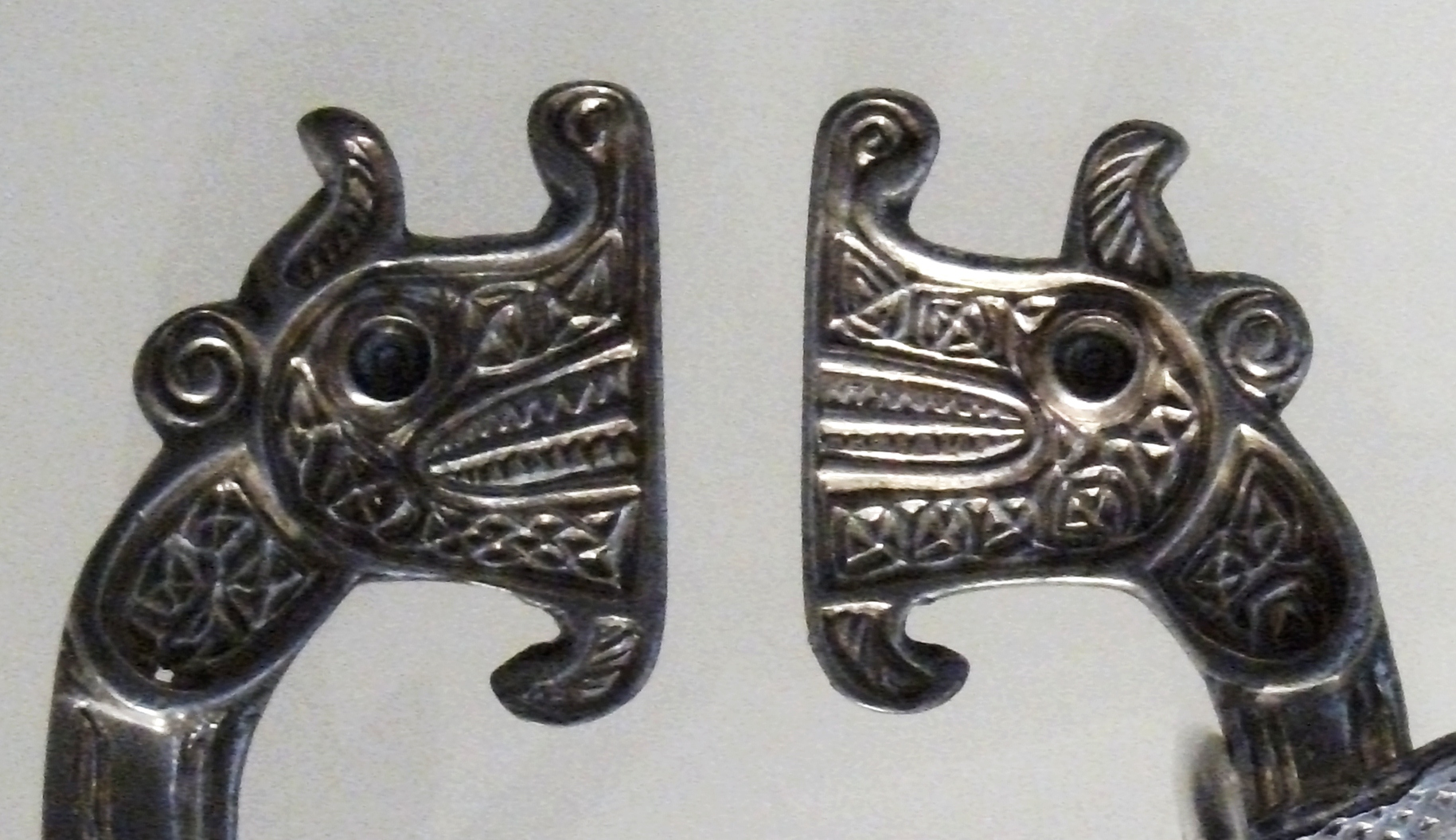
Zoomorphic brooch terminals

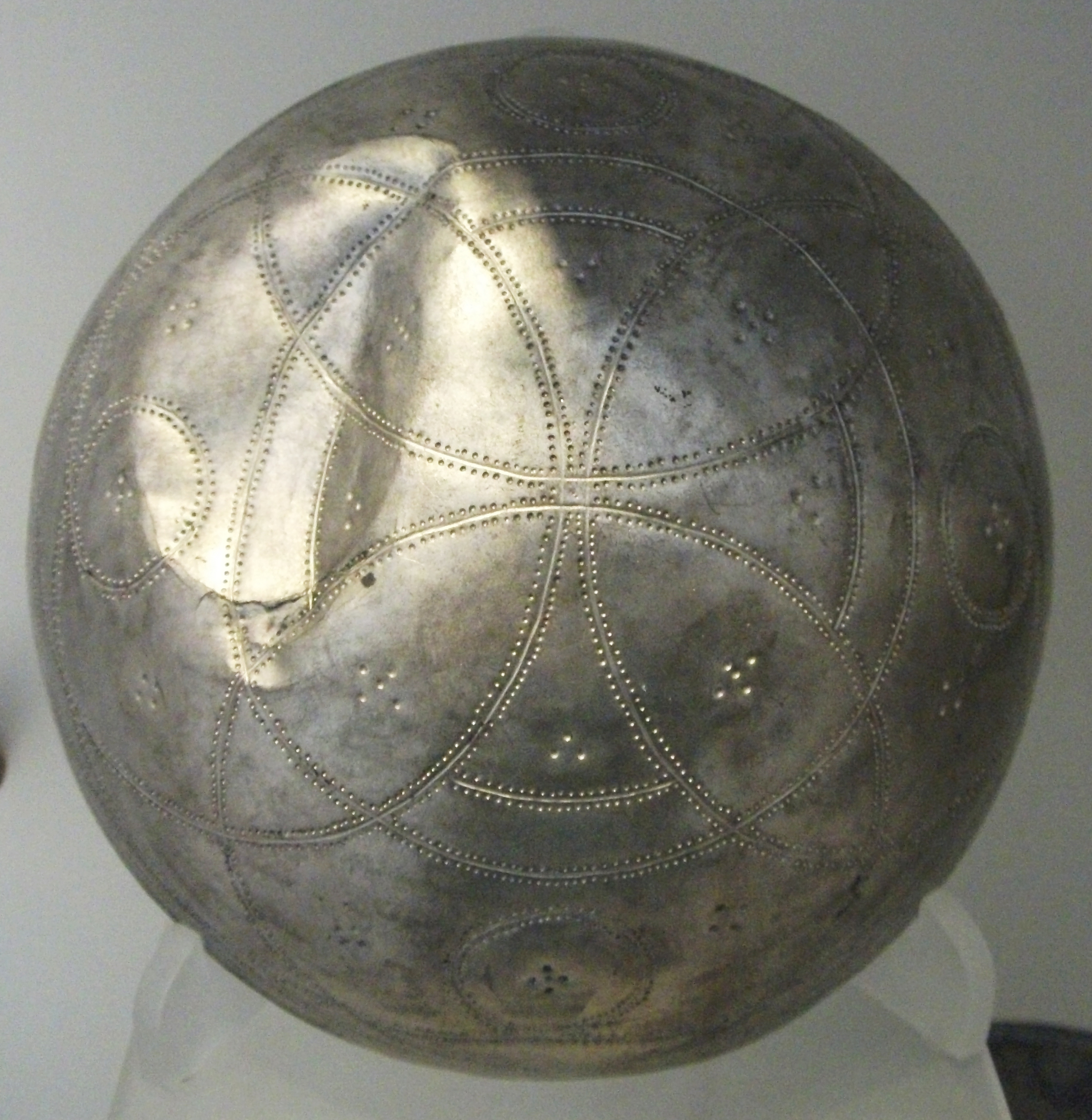
Bowl

== See also ==
- Norrie's Law hoard
- Pentney Hoard
- List of hoards in Great Britain
