= Cowan Head =

Hamlet in Cumbria, England

Coordinates: 54.368°N 2.782°W

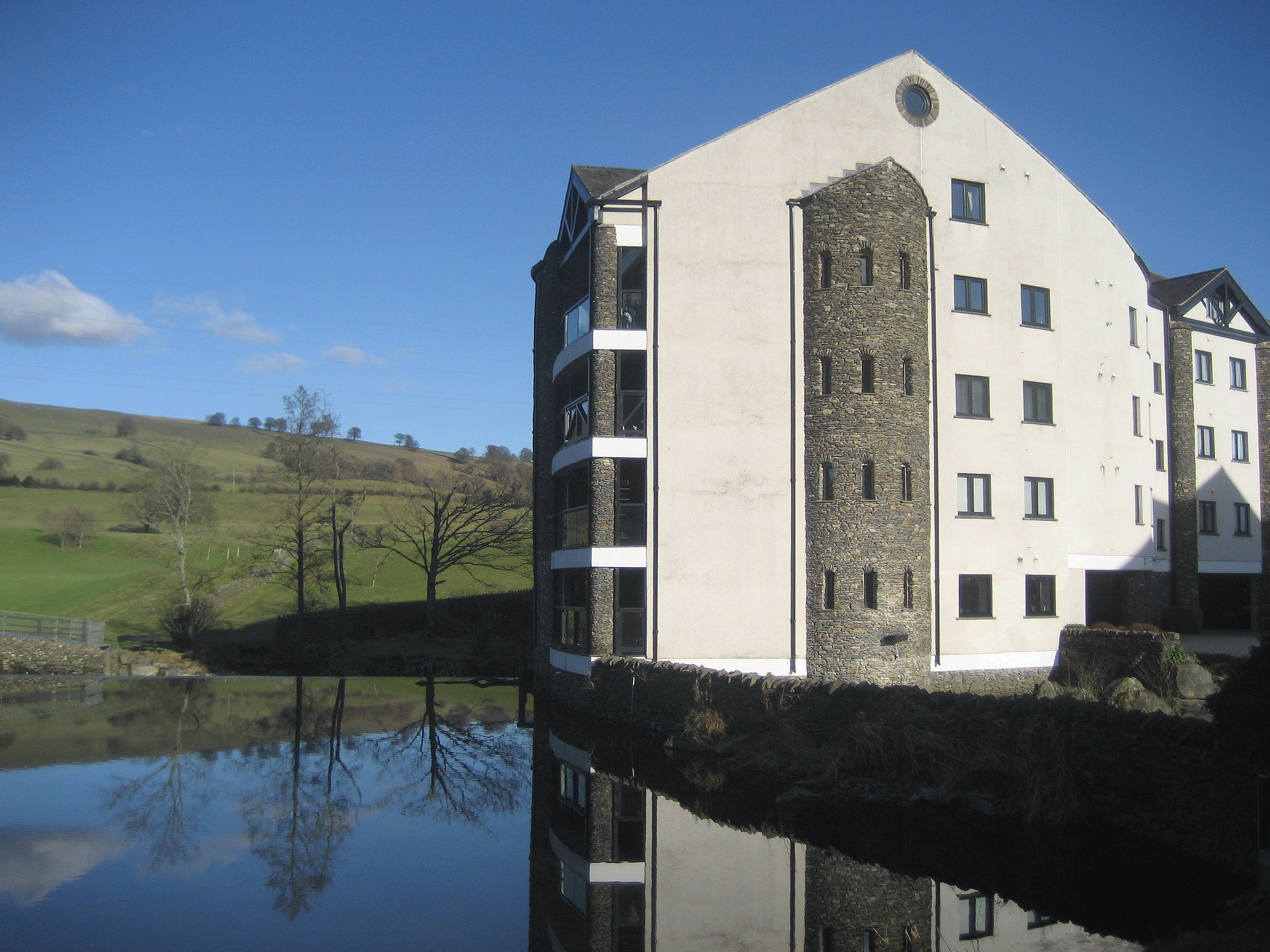
- Luxury Apartments at Cowan Head

- Location in South Lakeland Location within Cumbria
- OS grid reference: SD491972
- Civil parish: Strickland Ketel
- Unitary authority: Westmorland and Furness
- Ceremonial county: Cumbria
- Region: North West
- Country: England
- Sovereign state: United Kingdom
- Post town: KENDAL
- Postcode district: LA8
- Dialling code: 01539
- Police: Cumbria
- Fire: Cumbria
- Ambulance: North West
- UK Parliament: Westmorland and Lonsdale

Cowan Head is a hamlet in the civil parish of Strickland Ketel, in the Westmorland and Furness district, in the ceremonial county of Cumbria, England. It is on the River Kent upstream from Burneside.

== See also ==
- Burneside Paper Mills Tramway
