= Whitwell and Selside =

Coordinates: 54.38°N 2.72°W

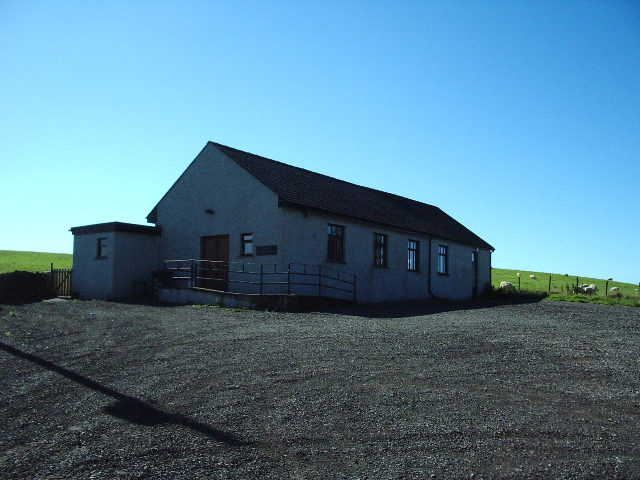
- Selside Memorial Hall

- Location within Cumbria
- Population: 198 (2001 census)
- Civil parish: Selside and Fawcett Forest
- Unitary authority: Westmorland and Furness
- Ceremonial county: Cumbria
- Region: North West
- Country: England
- Sovereign state: United Kingdom

Whitwell and Selside is a former civil parish, now part of the parish of Selside and Fawcett Forest, in the Westmorland and Furness district, in the ceremonial county of Cumbria, England. It did not have a parish council but a parish meeting. The neighbouring parishes were Whinfell to the east, Skelsmergh and Strickland Roger to the south west, Kentmere and Longsleddale to the west and Shap Rural to the north. The main settlement was the village of Selside.

In 2001 the parish had a population of 198. At the 2011 census Whitwell and Selside was grouped with both Fawcett Forest and Longsleddale giving a total population of 296.

There were 14 listed buildings or structures in the parish, including the grade II*, 14th-century, Selside Hall.

Whitwell and Selside was a township until 1866 when it became a separate civil parish. On 1 April 2020 the parish was abolished and merged with Fawcett Forest to form "Selside and Fawcett Forest".

== See also ==
- Listed buildings in Whitwell and Selside
