= Garnett Bridge =

Hamlet in Cumbria, England

Coordinates: 54.3865°N 2.7351°W

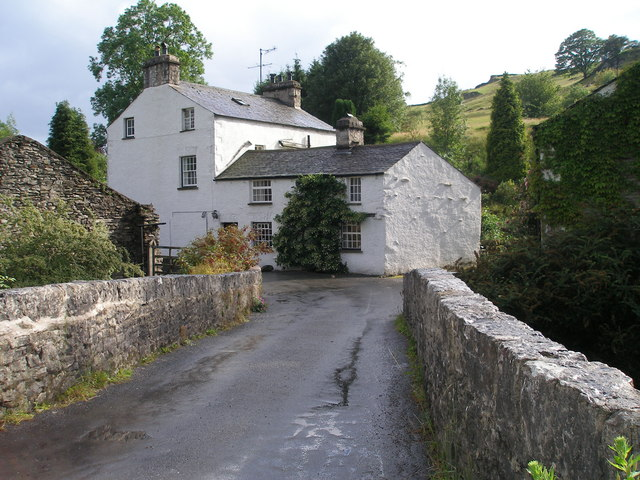
- Mill cottages, Garnett Bridge

- Location in South Lakeland Location within Cumbria
- OS grid reference: SD522992
- Civil parish: Strickland Roger; Whitwell and Selside
- Unitary authority: Westmorland and Furness
- Ceremonial county: Cumbria
- Region: North West
- Country: England
- Sovereign state: United Kingdom
- Post town: KENDAL
- Postcode district: LA8
- Dialling code: 01539
- Police: Cumbria
- Fire: Cumbria
- Ambulance: North West
- UK Parliament: Westmorland and Lonsdale

Garnett Bridge is a hamlet in Cumbria, England, on the River Sprint. It is located three miles by foot southeast of Long Sleddale. It consists mainly of old mill cottages and Bobbin Mill and a quaint old bridge over the Sprint.
