= Scalthwaiterigg =

Settlement in Cumbria, England

Coordinates: 54.3492°N 2.7008°W

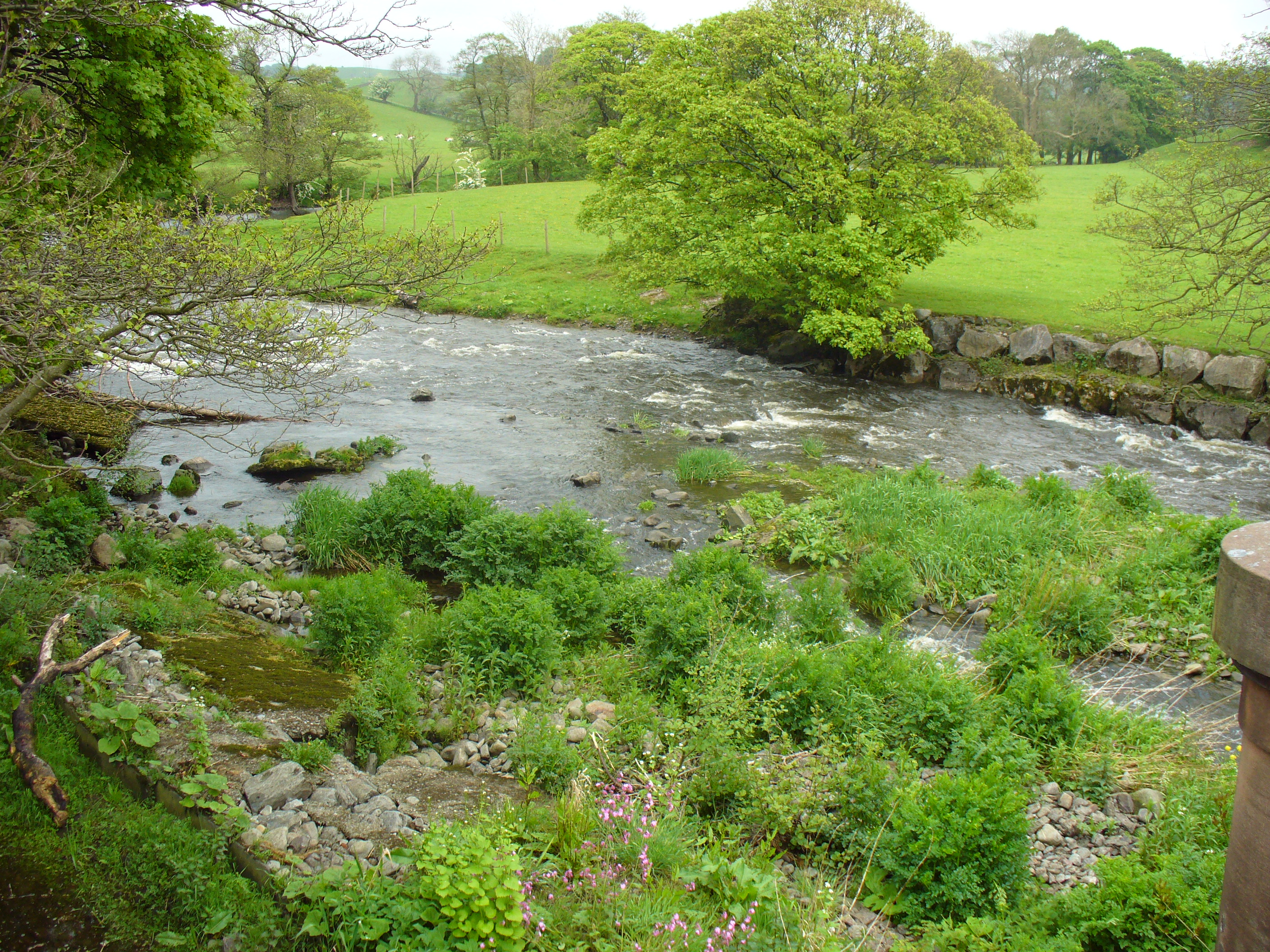
- The River Mint in Scalthwaiterigg

- Location within Cumbria
- Population: 104 (2001 census)
- Civil parish: Skelsmergh and Scalthwaiterigg
- Unitary authority: Westmorland and Furness
- Ceremonial county: Cumbria
- Region: North West
- Country: England
- Sovereign state: United Kingdom

Scalthwaiterigg is a former civil parish, now in the parish of Skelsmergh and Scalthwaiterigg, in the Westmorland and Furness district, in the ceremonial county of Cumbria, England, immediately north east of Kendal. It previously had a joint parish council with the adjacent parish of Skelsmergh. In 2001 it had a population of 104.

There were three listed buildings or structures in the parish: the 16th-century farmhouse Benson Hall and two bridges.

== History ==
The parish was formed on 1 April 1897 from part of Scalthwaiterigg Hay and Hutton in the Hay. On 1 April 2015 and merged with "Skelsmergh" to form "Skelsmergh and Scalthwaiterigg".
