= Kentrigg =

Area of Kendal, Cumbria, England

Coordinates: 54.341°N 2.745°W

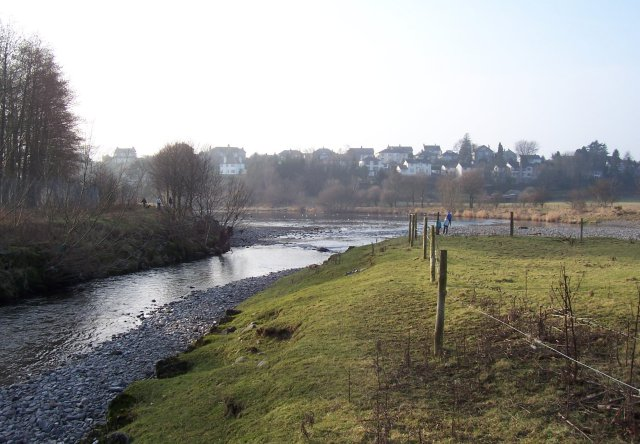
- Across the rivers to Kentrigg

- Location in South Lakeland Location within Cumbria
- OS grid reference: SD515942
- Civil parish: Kendal
- Unitary authority: Westmorland and Furness
- Ceremonial county: Cumbria
- Region: North West
- Country: England
- Sovereign state: United Kingdom
- Post town: KENDAL
- Postcode district: LA9
- Dialling code: 01539
- Police: Cumbria
- Fire: Cumbria
- Ambulance: North West
- UK Parliament: Westmorland and Lonsdale

Kentrigg is a northern suburb of Kendal, Cumbria, England. By road, Kentrigg is located 1.2 miles (1.9 km) north of the centre of Kendal and 1.4 miles (2.3 km) southeast of Burneside. It contains the Carus Green Golf Club, which separates it from Burneside just to the northwest. Across the River Kent to the east is the Shap Road Industrial Estate, north of the district of Mintsfeet and the Mintsfeet Industrial Estate which marks the southeastern side of Kentrigg.

The area contains a number of cottages which are let out to tourists. Helsfell Hall was the seat of the Briggs family which dominated the area in the 16th and 17th centuries up to the English Civil War. The old hall today is a Grade II listed building. 109 Burneside Road, also known as Aikrigg End, is a Grade II listed building, dated to the 18th and early 19th century. Kendal Fell lies to west of Kentrigg.

== History ==
Historically, the Briggs and Philipson (Phillipson) families dominated this area of northwest Kendal, which was under the parish of Kirkbie. A Christofer Philipson of Hollin Hall, near Crook (several miles to the northwest of Kentrigg), is documented in a will dated 20 May 1566 to have given Rolland Phillipson and his male heirs "lands I purchased of Mr. Heskett" in this area. Around 1581, the son of Robert Philipson married Elizabeth, daughter of Robert Briggs of Helsfell Hall and subsequently had five sons and two daughters. During the English Civil War in the 1640s, the Briggs family, who were Parliamentarians (Colonel Edward Briggs was a magistrate), clashed with their cousins, The Philipsons, who were strict Royalists. During the Siege of Carlisle, Colonel Briggs besieged Robert Philipson's Belle Isle on Windermere for eight to ten days. Robert Philipson is documented as having searched Kendal Church for his cousin Edward Briggs while he was at prayers on a Sunday morning with "the object of killing his cousin" in retaliation. The dominance of the area by the Briggs family ended after the civil war when the Philipsons stripped the family of their possessions, Robert Philipson taking ownership of the Colonel Brigg's seat at Helsfell Hall. The hall is mentioned in Cornelia Nicholson's The Annals of Kendal who documents that the seat of the Briggs family was "once a place of considerable importance."

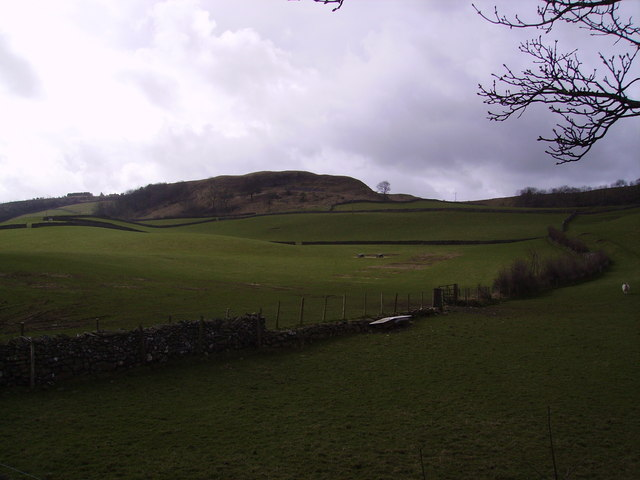
Kendal Fell

In 1936, 1380 yards of cast-iron and stoneware pipe sewers were built in Kentrigg. In 1974, under the Local Government Act 1972, Kentrigg and Burneside became a part of the South Lakeland district, its capital at Kendal.

The area has developed in recent decades from farmland with new housing estates and the development of the Mintsfeet Industrial Estate and the Shap Road Industrial Estate, across the River Kent. Tourism For All UK, a notable Cumbrian tourist operator, has their headquarters on the Shap Road estate. The River Mint drains into the Kent near here. South of the industrial estate is a park, known as the Jubilee Playing Fields.

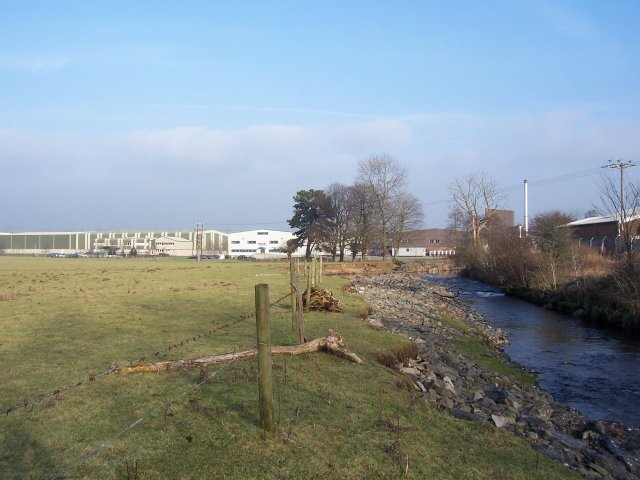
Shap Road Industrial Estate

A housing development named Kentrigg Walk was developed along the banks of the River Kent in the 1980s, containing 8 large detached houses. In 1994 the Kentrigg West Action Group (KWAG) was formed to object to further housing development of some 300 houses on 15.5 hectares of farmland. The lobbying by the local group managed to reduce the housing development to 150 houses, when a public inquiry in 1996 rejected proposals by the South Lakeland District Council to further develop the Low Sparrowmire fields. In April 2008, the council submitted a new proposal to build 400 houses a year, some 8880 houses in the northwest area of Kendal up to the year 2025. The local Steering Group appealed to MP Tim Farron and local councillors, primarily concerned with the affect the development would have on the area known as the Green Gap, an agricultural strip between Hallgarth housing estate and Carus Green on Burneside Road. More than 210 people signed the petition in support of KWAG.

Carus Green Golf Club was established in 1997 when farmer Fred Downham converted his farmland into an 18- hole golf course. The multimillion-pound development created 5 new jobs and has since attracted over 100 members. The Par 70 course measures 5860 yards, and the River Kent, Mint and River Sprint meander across the course. The course is managed by Graham Curtin. Several artefacts were unearthed during the building of the golf course.

== Landmarks ==
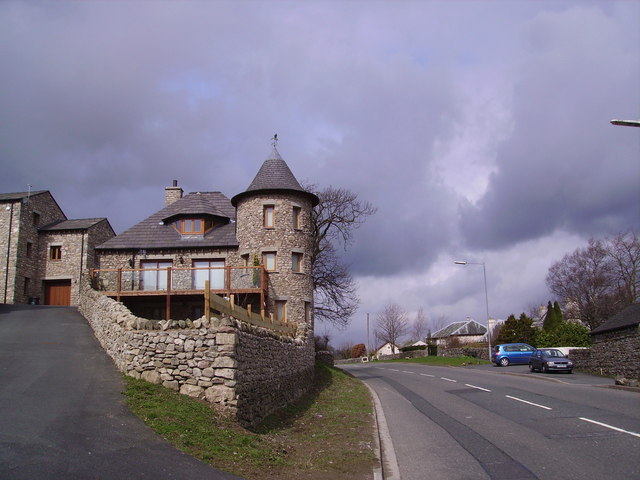
Newer Helsfell Hall

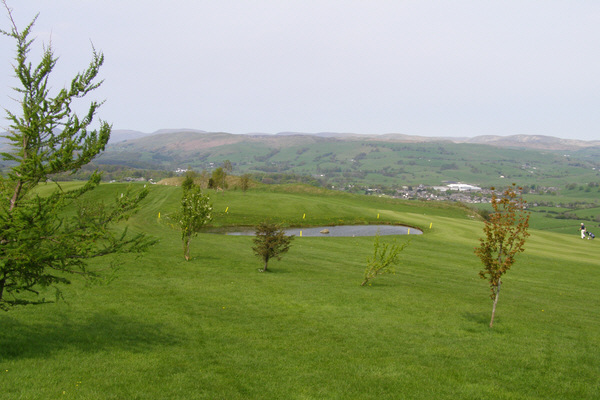
Kendal Golf Club course near Kendal Fell

Kentrigg House on Burneside Road has been used as the clubhouse of the Carus Green Golf Club since 2011. It hosts golf seminars and product launches, as well as county events, and has a bar, restaurant, function suite and four apartments. Local concerns were raised that the clubhouse might cause disturbances in the area and function as a nightclub, but soundproofing measures have been implemented at the house.

109 Burneside Road, also known as Aikrigg End, is a Grade II listed building. It is dated to the 18th and early 19th century. The roof is hipped with a graduated slate roof and gabled porch on the south side. It is 2 storeys high, with 3 bays and a panelled door. The area also contains numerous cottages which are let out to tourists, such as the Old Woolyard and Low Plumgarths Farmhouse, about a mile from Kentrigg. Architect W. A. Nelson designed two of the houses along Burneside Road. Also of note is Hallgarth Cottage and Helsfell Hall off the A5264 road beyond the Hallgarth estate to the west of Kentrigg, Cherry Tree Cottage, Elm Court, and The Oddfellows Arms pub. The old 16th century Helsfell Hall is located in a field high above the A5264, becoming a Grade II listed building in 1984.
