= Fawcett Forest =

Former civil parish in Cumbria, England

Coordinates: 54.405°N 2.709°W

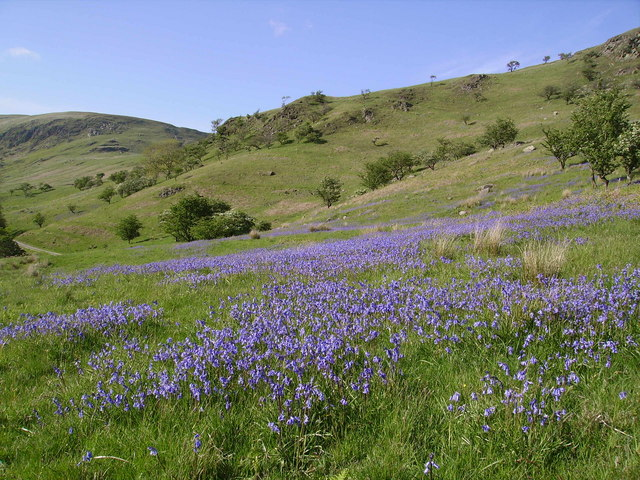
- Bluebells in Bannisdale

- Location in South Lakeland Location within Cumbria
- Population: 23 (2001)
- OS grid reference: NY5401
- Civil parish: Selside and Fawcett Forest
- Unitary authority: Westmorland and Furness
- Ceremonial county: Cumbria
- Region: North West
- Country: England
- Sovereign state: United Kingdom
- Post town: KENDAL
- Postcode district: LA8
- Dialling code: 01539
- Police: Cumbria
- Fire: Cumbria
- Ambulance: North West
- UK Parliament: Westmorland and Lonsdale

Fawcett Forest is a former civil parish, now in the parish of Selside and Fawcett Forest, in the Westmorland and Furness district of the English county of Cumbria. It included the valley of Bannisdale. The parish had a population of 23 in 2001. Owing to the minimal population from the 2011 Census details are included in the civil parish of Whitwell and Selside.

== History ==
Fawcett Forest was a township in the parish of Kendal until 1866 when it became a separate civil parish. On 1 April 2020 the parish was abolished and merged with Whitwell and Selside to form "Selside and Fawcett Forest".

== See also ==
- Listed buildings in Fawcett Forest
