= Listed buildings in Whinfell =

Whinfell is a civil parish in Westmorland and Furness, Cumbria, England. It contains nine listed buildings that are recorded in the National Heritage List for England. All the listed buildings are designated at Grade II, the lowest of the three grades, which is applied to "buildings of national importance and special interest". The parish is entirely rural, and the listed buildings consist of houses and associated structures, farmhouses, farm buildings, two bridges and a limekiln.

== Buildings ==
Name and location	Photograph	Date	Notes
Topthorne Farmhouse; 54.38048°N 2.68355°W	—	Late 17th century (probable)	The farmhouse was extended in the 18th century, and is in roughcast stone with a slate roof. There are two storeys, three bays, and a rear gabled wing with an outshut. On the front is a gabled porch, the windows in the ground floor are casements with a hood mould above, and in the upper floor they are sashes.
Agnes Gill; 54.38898°N 2.66645°W	—	Late 17th or early 18th century (probable)	The house was extended in the 19th century. It is in roughcast stone with a slate roof, two storeys, four bays, and a lean-to outshut on the left. On the front is a gabled porch. Most of the windows are sashes, there is a fire window and casement windows at the rear.
Rossil Bridge; 54.39068°N 2.68926°W	—	17th or 18th century (probable)	The bridge crosses the River Mint. It is in stone and consists of a single segmental arch. The bridge has a large parapet and the roadway is about 3 metres (9.8 ft) wide.
Barn to southeast of Topthorne Farmhouse; 54.38037°N 2.68330°W	—	18th century	The barn is in stone with a slate roof, and there is a later outshut to the east. The openings include a segmental-headed entrance, entrances with flat heads, a barn entrance, windows, and a loading door.
Ivy Bridge; 54.36343°N 2.67592°W	—	Late 18th or early 19th century (probable)	The bridge carries a road over the River Mint. It is in stone and consists of a single segmental arch with a plain parapet, and it has two arches to take flood water to the north. To the north of the main arch is a canted cutwater, flanked by flat piers.
Limekiln; 54.38229°N 2.66409°W	—	18th or 19th century (probable)	The limekiln is in stone, and consists of a square structure built into a slope. The fire hole has canted sides, and the charge hole is blocked.
Barn to southwest of Topthorne Farmhouse; 54.38030°N 2.68376°W	—	Late 18th or early 19th century (probable)	The barn is in stone with quoins and a slate roof. It has a barn entrance, two cow house entrances, now blocked, and an entrance at the right end.
Shaw End; 54.36855°N 2.68021°W		Early 19th century	A stone house with a slate roof and a U-shaped plan. The main block has two storeys and seven bays, and to the north is a service wing leading to a further range to the west. The main block has a sill band and a cornice, a central tetrastyle portico with capitals, a frieze and a pediment, and a fanlight above the door. The windows are sashes, and the window above the entrance has an architrave, a frieze and a cornice on consoles.
Stable building, Shaw End; 54.36848°N 2.68109°W	—	Early 19th century (probable)	The stable block is in stone with quoins and a slate roof. The south front has five bays, and at the rear is a gabled wing. The central bay projects forward and contains a round-headed entrance, an impost band, a cornice band, and a pedimented gable. The outer bays have round-headed openings, some blocked, and some with fanlights, and in the upper storeys are ventilation slits. Above the gable is an octagonal cupola with a clock face and a weathervane.
