= Burneside Hall =

Peel tower in Cumbria, England

- Cumbria, England
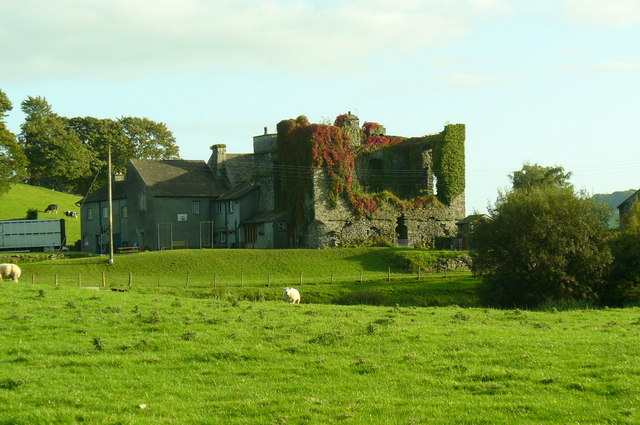
- The ruined pele tower

Site information
- Type: Pele tower
- Owner: private
- Open to the public: No
- Condition: Ruined

Location
- Shown within Cumbria
- Coordinates: 54.3563°N 2.7570°W
- Grid reference: grid reference SD509959

Burneside Hall is a converted medieval pele tower in Burneside, Cumbria, England.

== History ==
Documentary records for Burneside Hall extend to 1290, when a property was owned on the site by Gilbert Burneshead, the Under-Sheriff of Westmorland. Richard Bellingham, a member of an influential Northumberland family, married Burneshead's daughter, acquiring the site.

Burneside Hall in its current form was originally built in the second half of the 14th century by the Bellingham family.

The medieval heart of Burneside Hall was a pair of pele towers, linked by a large, open hall. Only one of these towers still remains, three storeys tall but badly ruined, measuring 20 feet by 35 feet (6 metres by 11 metres). This tower was originally the buttery and pantry, forming the service end of the castle.

A two-storey gatehouse at the front of the property was built in the late-16th or 17th century, with a relatively substantial barmkin wall, 6 feet (2 metres) thick in places, erected around it. The original open hall was converted into smaller rooms in the 17th century, and additional windows added.

The second tower was of similar height to the first, but narrower; it was rebuilt in the 18th century and effectively destroyed.

A 2019 dendrochronological analysis report for Historic England dated 39 timbers from the hall. Dates ranged from timber felled in 1422, with the bulk of the dated timbers, mostly used in the hall roof, being felled between 1579 and 1604. Later timbers in the building date from between 1612–37 and 1605–30.

== Ownership ==
The Bellinghams remained the owners until Burnaldeshede 'Castle' was seized by the King in 1461, when Henry Bellingham was attanted for treason, and it was held by the Parr family until Bellingham's general pardon in 1480.

During the 1530s it was sold by the Bellinghams to Sir Thomas Clifford, and passed from him to John Fitzwilliam, who in 1552 sold it to John Machell of Kendal and London (Sheriff of London 1555-6).

His heirs sold it to the Braithwaite family, who retained it for the next seven generations. During the early 17th century it was the home of the poet Richard Brathwaite.

The second tower was rebuilt in the 18th century and effectively destroyed in the process. In the late 19th-century, Stephen Brunskill inherited the property and conducted some restoration work on the medieval parts of the property.

== Today ==
Burneside Hall is a Grade II* listed building and scheduled monument; as of 2014, Historic England (then known as English Heritage) considered the Burneside Hall pele tower to be formally at risk of slow decay.

The Hall is part of a working tenanted farm.

== See also ==
- Grade II* listed buildings in Westmorland and Furness
- Listed buildings in Strickland Roger
- Castles in Great Britain and Ireland
- List of castles in England

== Bibliography ==
- Emery, Anthony. (1996) Greater Medieval Houses of England and Wales, 1300-1500: Northern England. Cambridge: Cambridge University Press. ISBN 978-0-521-49723-7.
- Jones, Thomas. (1912) The History of Burneside. Kendal, UK: Atkinson and Politt.
- Pettifer, Adrian. (2002) English Castles: a Guide by Counties. Woodbridge, UK: Boydell Press. ISBN 978-0-85115-782-5.
