= Selside =

Village in Cumbria, England

Coordinates: 54.383°N 2.709°W

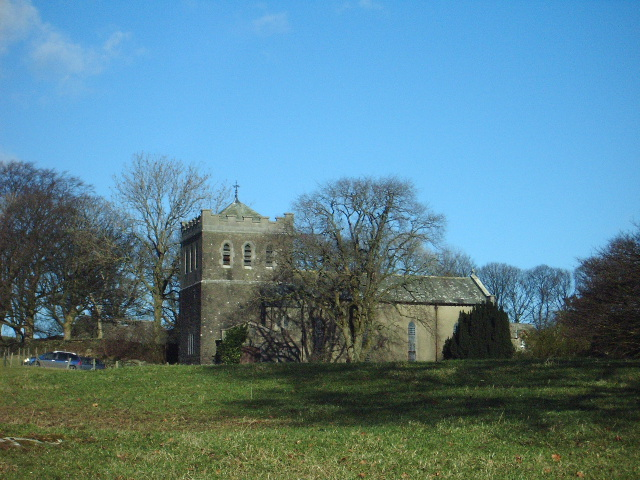
- St. Thomas's Church, Selside

- Location in South Lakeland Location within Cumbria
- Population: 296 (2011)
- OS grid reference: SD539988
- Civil parish: Selside and Fawcett Forest
- Unitary authority: Westmorland and Furness
- Ceremonial county: Cumbria
- Region: North West
- Country: England
- Sovereign state: United Kingdom
- Post town: KENDAL
- Postcode district: LA8
- Dialling code: 01539
- Police: Cumbria
- Fire: Cumbria
- Ambulance: North West
- UK Parliament: Westmorland and Lonsdale

Selside is a small village in rural Cumbria, England, about 6 miles (9.7 km) north of Kendal, close to the A6 road. It is now in the civil parish of Selside and Fawcett Forest, though it was formerly in the parish of Kendal. The population of Whitwell and Selside civil parish taken at the 2011 census was 296.

St. Thomas's Church at Selside dates from 1838, with the tower added in 1894. Near to the church, Selside Hall incorporates the remains of two pele towers of the 15th and 16th centuries, with 18th-century and later alterations and additions.

== See also ==
- Listed buildings in Whitwell and Selside
