= Selside and Fawcett Forest =

Civil parish in Cumbria, England

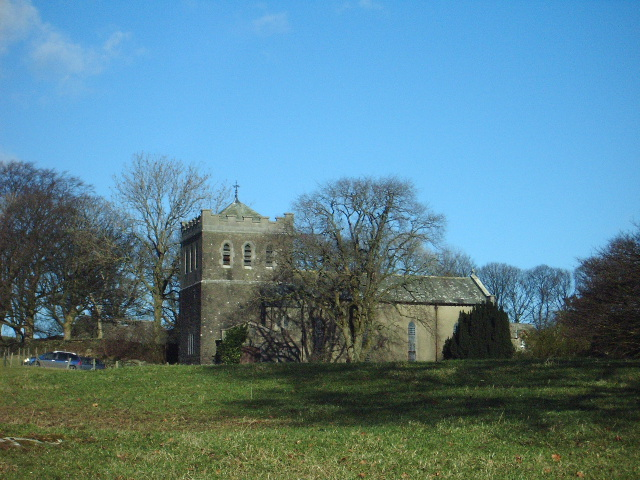
- St Thomas' Church, Selside

- Location in South Lakeland Location within Cumbria
- Civil parish: Selside and Fawcett Forest
- Unitary authority: Westmorland and Furness
- Ceremonial county: Cumbria
- Region: North West
- Country: England
- Sovereign state: United Kingdom
- Post town: KENDAL
- Postcode district: LA8
- Dialling code: 01539
- Police: Cumbria
- Fire: Cumbria
- Ambulance: North West
- UK Parliament: Westmorland and Lonsdale

Selside and Fawcett Forest is a civil parish in the Westmorland and Furness district, in the county of Cumbria, England. It was created on 1 April 2020, from the civil parishes of Fawcett Forest and Whitwell and Selside. It borders the parishes of Skelsmergh and Scalthwaiterigg, Longsleddale, Shap Rural, Orton, Whinfell and Strickland Roger.

The population of "Whitwell and Selside" in the 2011 United Kingdom census was 296, but data for Fawcett Forest is unavailable.

== See also ==
- Listed buildings in Selside and Fawcett Forest
