= Bowston =

Village in Cumbria, England

Coordinates: 54.35°N 2.78°W

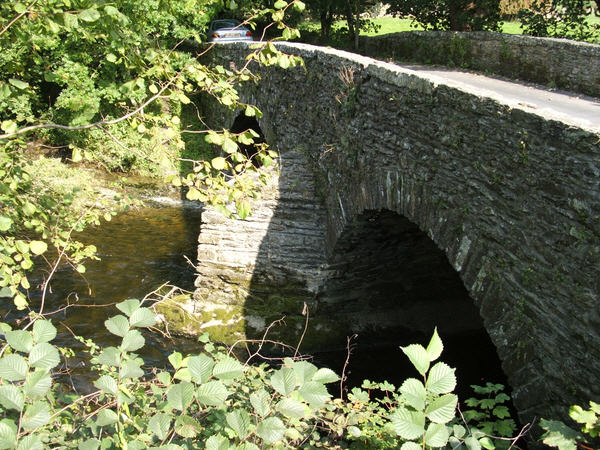
- Bowston Bridge

- Location in South Lakeland Location within Cumbria
- OS grid reference: SD4996
- Civil parish: Strickland Ketel
- Unitary authority: Westmorland and Furness
- Ceremonial county: Cumbria
- Region: North West
- Country: England
- Sovereign state: United Kingdom
- Post town: Kendal
- Postcode district: LA8
- Dialling code: 01539
- Police: Cumbria
- Fire: Cumbria
- Ambulance: North West
- UK Parliament: Westmorland and Lonsdale

Bowston is a village in Cumbria, England, situated about 4 miles (6.4 km) north of Kendal, beside the River Kent. It has an old, probably 17th century, bridge over the river which is a Grade II listed structure. A rare VR (Victoria Regina) postbox can be seen in the wall at the junction of Burneside Road and Potter Fell road.

The village was home to William T. Palmer, an unsung Lakeland author and climber.

A mile north of the village, Godmond Hall is a 17th-century house incorporating a medieval pele tower.

== History ==
Bowston has roots in the paper production industry, which made Cropper's Paper Mill at Burneside successful. In 1880 Bowston Mill, between Burneside and Cowan Head, was purchased by Cropper's. Bowston Mill may well have begun life as a fulling mill, but a new building was constructed to prepare rags and ropes for the other two mills. Bowston Mill was closed in the early 1960s when waste paper rather than rags came into use in the paper pulp. The mill has now been replaced by terraced housing running along the river's edge.

== Walking ==
Bowston is on the Dales Way which links Windermere in the west to Yorkshire in the East, making it a busy destination for walkers and climbers who follow this long-distance path. The village is also at the bottom of the ascent to Potter Fell.

== See also ==
- Listed buildings in Strickland Ketel
