= Listed buildings in Strickland Roger =

Strickland Roger is a civil parish in Westmorland and Furness, Cumbria, England. It contains nine listed buildings that are recorded in the National Heritage List for England. Of these, one is listed at Grade II*, the middle of the three grades, and the others are at Grade II, the lowest grade. The parish is almost completely rural, and the listed buildings consist of houses, a gatehouse, farmhouses and farm buildings, a bridge, and a cottage associated with a mill.

== Key ==
Grade	Criteria
II*	Particularly important buildings of more than special interest
II	Buildings of national importance and special interest

== Buildings ==
Name and location	Photograph	Date	Notes	Grade
Burneside Hall; 54.35657°N 2.75558°W		14th century	A large house, later subdivided, it consists of a hall with cross-wings. The north wing was a pele tower which is now ruinous. The house is in stone, mainly roughcast, with a green slate roof. The doorways have pointed heads, and the windows are mullioned. The pele tower is part of a scheduled monument.	II*
Gatehouse and curtain wall, Burneside Hall; 54.35648°N 2.75607°W	—	16th century (probable)	The gatehouse is in stone, and has a green slate roof. It has two storeys and contains a round-headed arch with voussoirs. In the arch is a massive oak door with a dog gate, and above it are two mullioned windows. The arch is flanked by stone curtain walls. The gatehouse and wall are part of a scheduled monument.	II
High Hundhowe; 54.37465°N 2.78253°W	—	17th century	A house that was much altered later, it is roughcast with a slate roof and three massive round chimney stacks. There are two storeys, five bays, and an early 20th-century extension to the right. On the front of the original part is a two-storey porch and mullioned windows. In the extension is a bay window and an external staircase.	II
Laithwaite Farmhouse; 54.36605°N 2.76978°W	—	17th century	The farmhouse is in stone and has a green slate roof with stone ridge tiles and ball finials. There are two storeys, five bays, the outer bays being gabled, and a 19th-century extension to the right. On the garden front is a lean-to porch, the windows are casements, and inside the farmhouse is an inglenook fireplace.	II
Low Hundhowe and outbuilding 54.37363°N 2.77919°W	—	17th century	The farmhouse, shippon and hay loft are in roughcast stone with a green slate roof. The house has two storeys and six bays. On the front is a large porch with a slated roof and containing side benches. Most of the windows are casements. The shippon to the left has a slated lean-to, a canopy, and two small openings.	II
Godmond Hall; 54.37368°N 2.77183°W	—	Late 17th century (probable)	The house incorporates part of an earlier pele tower. It is in stone, partly rendered, with a slate roof. There are three storeys, a main range of three bays, and a south wing. On the front is a stone porch, the windows are casements, and in the top floor are three dormers. In the south wing is a lattice window and a mullioned window.	II
Ghyll Cottage and Barn; 54.37364°N 2.77571°W	—	c.1700	The house and barn are in stone, the house is rendered, and they have slate roofs. The house has a plinth to the right side, two storeys, three bays, and sash windows. The barn to the left has protruding through-stones.	II
Garnett Bridge; 54.38660°N 2.73501°W		18th century	The bridge carries a narrow road over the River Sprint. It is in limestone and consists of a single arch over a natural gorge.	II
Mill Cottage, Mill and barns 54.38597°N 2.73481°W	—	18th century (probable)	The cottage, mill and barns are in stone with slate roofs. The cottage has two storeys and two bays, and there is a single-storey extension to the right. In the ground floor are two casement windows, and there are two sash windows above. The mill and barns are at right angles on the left. The mill has casement windows, and inside is a wheel.	II
