= Whinfell =

Civil parish in Cumbria, England

Coordinates: 54.3823°N 2.6707°W

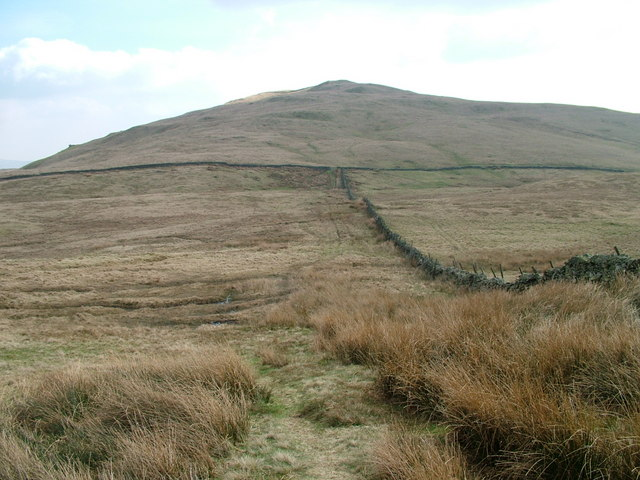

- Location within Cumbria
- Civil parish: Whinfell
- Unitary authority: Westmorland and Furness
- Ceremonial county: Cumbria
- Region: North West
- Country: England
- Sovereign state: United Kingdom

Whinfell is a civil parish in Westmorland and Furness, Cumbria, England. It does not have a parish council but a parish meeting. The parish lies north east of Kendal, between the A6 and the A685. The neighbouring parishes are Grayrigg to the east, Docker to the south, Skelsmergh to the south west, Selside and Fawcett Forest to the west, and Tebay to the north.

In the 2001 census Whinfell had a population of 152, increasing at the 2011 census to 186.

There are nine grade II listed buildings or structures in the parish, including bridges, barns, houses and a limekiln.

== History ==
The name "Whinfell" means 'Gorse/whin mountain'. Whinfell was formerly a township in the parish of Kendal, in 1866 Whinfell became a civil parish in its own right. On 1 April 1986 Patton parish was merged with Whinfell.

== See also ==
- Listed buildings in Whinfell
