= Skelsmergh and Scalthwaiterigg =

Civil parish in Cumbria, England

Coordinates: 54.35°N 2.72°W

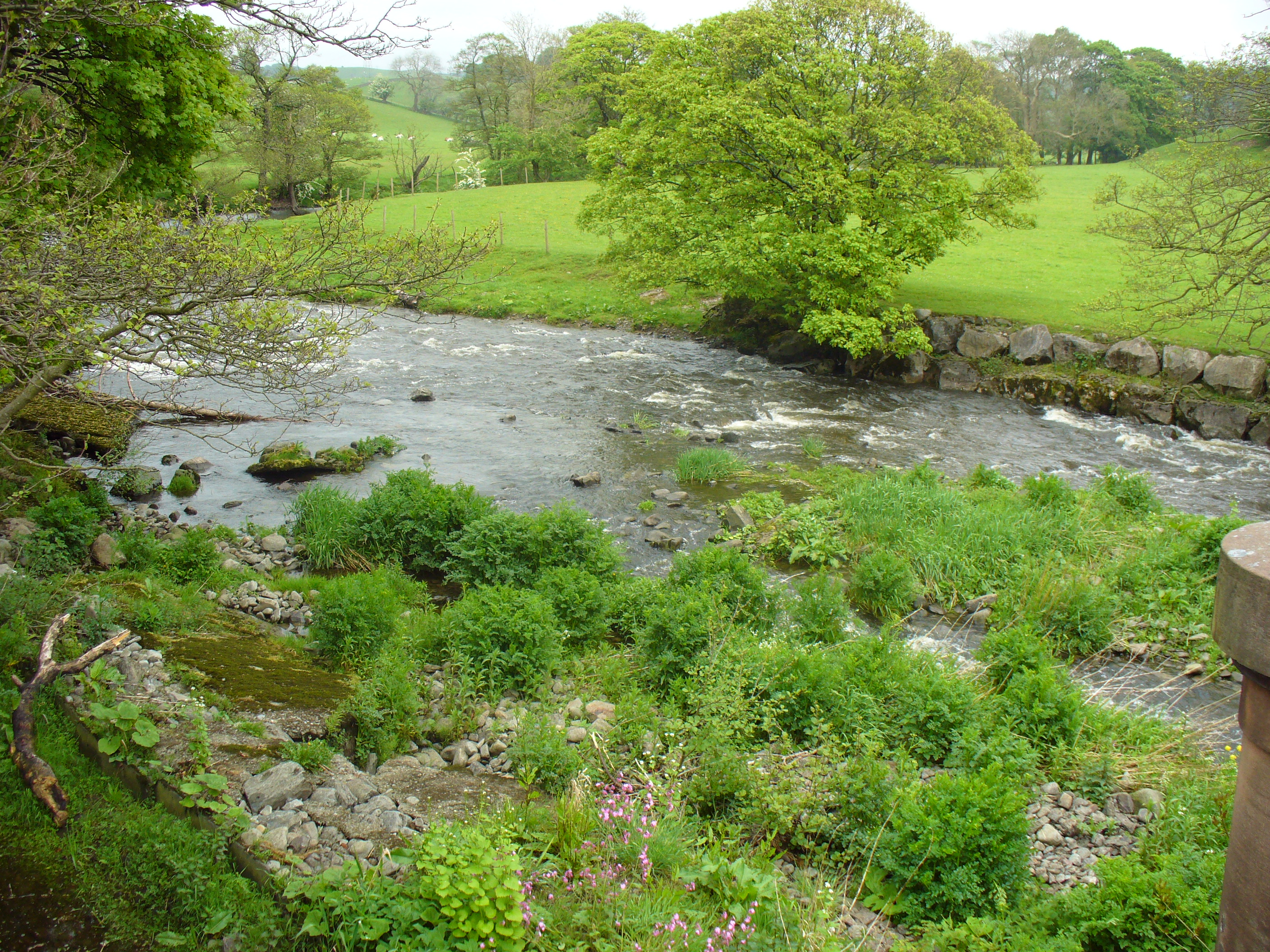
The River Mint which forms the boundary between the two wards, the former parishes

Skelsmergh and Scalthwaiterigg is a civil parish in Westmorland and Furness district, Cumbria, England. It was formed on 1 April 2015 by merging the parishes of Skelsmergh and Scalthwaiterigg, which had shared a parish council since 2007.

The parish is divided into two wards, separated by the River Mint and named for the two previous parishes. Skelsmergh parish ward (north of the river) is represented by five councillors, and Scalthwaiterigg parish ward (south of the river) by two councillors, a pattern established in 2007.

The population of the former parish of Skelsmergh was 303 in the 2011 United Kingdom census; the 2011 population of the former parish of Scalthwaiterigg is not available, but its 2001 population was 104. (the 2001 population of Skelsmergh was 271).

The areas of the two former parishes were 7.8435 km^{2} (3.0284 sq mi) (Skelsmergh) 4.22 km^{2} (1.63 sq mi) (Scalthwaiterigg), giving an area for the current parish of 12.02635 km^{2} (4.64340 sq mi). The southern part of the parish includes the 317 metres (1,040 ft) hill Benson Knott, which is classified as a HuMP, a TuMP and a Clem. The A6 from Kendal to Shap, the A685 road from Kendal to Tebay, and the Dales Way footpath from Ilkley to Bowness all pass through the parish.

There are eight listed buildings in the parish, all at grade II.

== See also ==
- Listed buildings in Skelsmergh and Scalthwaiterigg
