= Listed buildings in Strickland Ketel =

Strickland Ketel is a civil parish in Westmorland and Furness, Cumbria, England. It contains 16 listed buildings that are recorded in the National Heritage List for England. All the listed buildings are designated at Grade II, the lowest of the three grades, which is applied to "buildings of national importance and special interest". The parish contains the villages of Burneside and Bowston, and is otherwise rural. The listed buildings consist of farmhouses, farm buildings, a country house and its folly gatehouse, smaller houses, a summer house, a bridge, a monument, and three milestones.

== Buildings ==
Name and location	Photograph	Date	Notes
Barn, Helsfell Farm; 54.33754°N 2.77055°W	—	16th century (probable)	The barn is probably the remains of Helsfield Hall. It is in limestone and has a slate roof. The windows have moulded hood moulds.
Plumgarths Cottages; 54.34461°N 2.77718°W		1611	Originally one house, later divided into two dwellings, it is in roughcast stone with a slate roof, and has two massive circular chimneys. There are two storeys, two gabled porches on the front, and a mix of casement and sash windows.
Tolson Hall; 54.35177°N 2.77576°W		1638	A country house that was altered and extended in about 1800, and again later in the 19th century. It is in stone, mainly rendered, and has slate roofs. The house has two storeys with attics, and consists of a main range with flanking receding wings. The south front has a central gabled porch, and the flanking wings are also gabled, all with decorative bargeboards and finials. Most of the windows are sashes.
Barbary Crag; 54.35444°N 2.77995°W	—	17th century	A stone house with a slate roof, two storeys and five bays. On the front is a gabled porch with a slate roof and a French window; the other windows are casements. Inside is an upper cruck truss.
Bowston Bridge; 54.36253°N 2.77296°W		17th century (probable)	The bridge carries a road over the River Kent. It is in stone and has two arches. The bridge has through-stones, voussoirs, copings and a central pier with cutwaters.
Hollins Farmhouse and outbuildings 54.35090°N 2.76722°W	—	17th century	The farmhouse is in roughcast stone with a slate roof. On the front is a porch, and the windows are sashes. There is a cruck truss in the west wing. The outbuilding is in stone with protruding through-stones and a slate roof.
Low Brundrigg Farmhouse; 54.34778°N 2.79568°W	—	17th century	The farmhouse was later extended. It is in stone and has a green slate roof with a stone ridge. The original block has two storeys and two bays, there is a lower two-storey extension to the right, and a single-storey extension to the left. The windows in the original block are casements, in the right extension there are casement windows in the upper floor and sash windows in the ground floor. At the rear is a mullioned window.
Helsfell Farmhouse; 54.33830°N 2.77361°W	—	Late 17th century	The farmhouse is rendered with a slate roof. There are two storeys, and the house has an L-shaped plan. The windows vary; one has mullions and pointed arched heads.
Gateway, Tolson Hall; 54.35084°N 2.77374°W		c. 1800	The gateway is built as a folly, it is in limestone, and consists of a four-centred arch with voussoirs. The arch is flanked by embattled turrets with cross loops.
Elba Monument; 54.34915°N 2.77550°W		1814	The monument commemorates William Pitt the Younger, and was designed by George Webster. It consists of a limestone obelisk on a two-stage plinth.
Junction Cottages; 54.35185°N 2.75988°W	—	1835	Originally a toll house, later divided into two houses, it is in stone, partly roughcast, and has a green slate roof. There are two storeys with attics, and the building has doorways and windows of varying types. In the south front is a bay window with Gothic tracery, and on the east side is a gatepost for the toll gate.
Barn group, Low Brundrigg Farm; 54.34768°N 2.79542°W	—	19th century	A group of farm buildings, including a barn, a hayloft, a cow house, a milking shed, and a stable. They are in stone with limestone quoins, and green slate roofs with blue glazed ridge tiles. Above the openings are slate lintels.
Summer house, Whitefoot; 54.35954°N 2.77041°W	—	Mid 19th century (probable)	The summer house is in limestone with a slate roof. The eaves overhang on curved timber brackets, and on the roof is a weathervane. There are small windows with stone lintels and sills, and a door in the west side.
Milestone at junction of Ratherheath Lane; 54.35015°N 2.80383°W	—	Late 19th century (probable)	The milestone is on the north side of the B5284 road. It is in limestone with chamfered edges, and is inscribed with the distances in miles to Kendal and to Bowness-on-Windermere. There is a benchmark on the side.
Milestone north of Ratherheath Lane; 54.35978°N 2.79265°W	—	Late 19th century (probable)	The milestone is in a lay-by to the west of the A591 road. It is in limestone with chamfered edges, and is inscribed with the distances in miles to Kendal and to Windermere.
Milestone near Hollins Lane; 54.34938°N 2.77653°W	—	Late 19th century (probable)	The milestone is in a loop road to the east of the A591 road. It is in limestone with chamfered edges, and is inscribed with the distances in miles to Kendal and to Windermere. There is a benchmark on the side.
