= Burneside Paper Mills Tramway =

Railway in Cumbria, England

Burneside Tramway
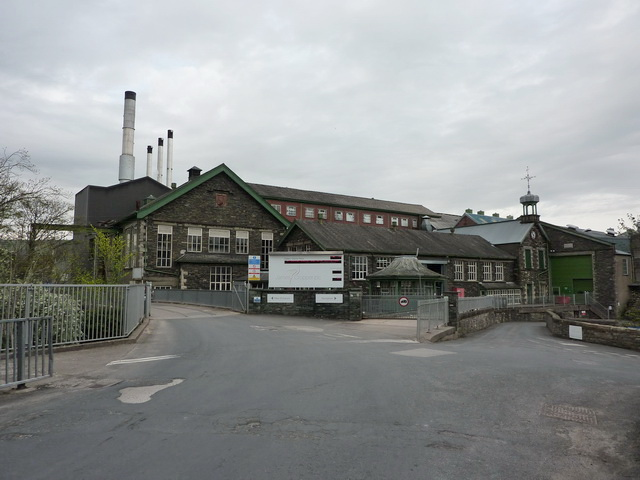
- Entrance to James Cropper, Burneside Mills. The tramway tracks still visible on the left.

Overview
- Headquarters: Burneside, Cumbria
- Locale: England
- Dates of operation: 1880–1974
- Successor: Abandoned

Technical
- Track gauge: 3 ft 6 in (1,067 mm) and 1,435 mm (4 ft 8 1/2 in)
- Length: 1 1/2 miles (2.4 km)

The Burneside Tramway was initially a narrow-gauge and later a standard-gauge industrial railway serving the James Cropper paper mills around Burneside, Cumbria.

== History ==
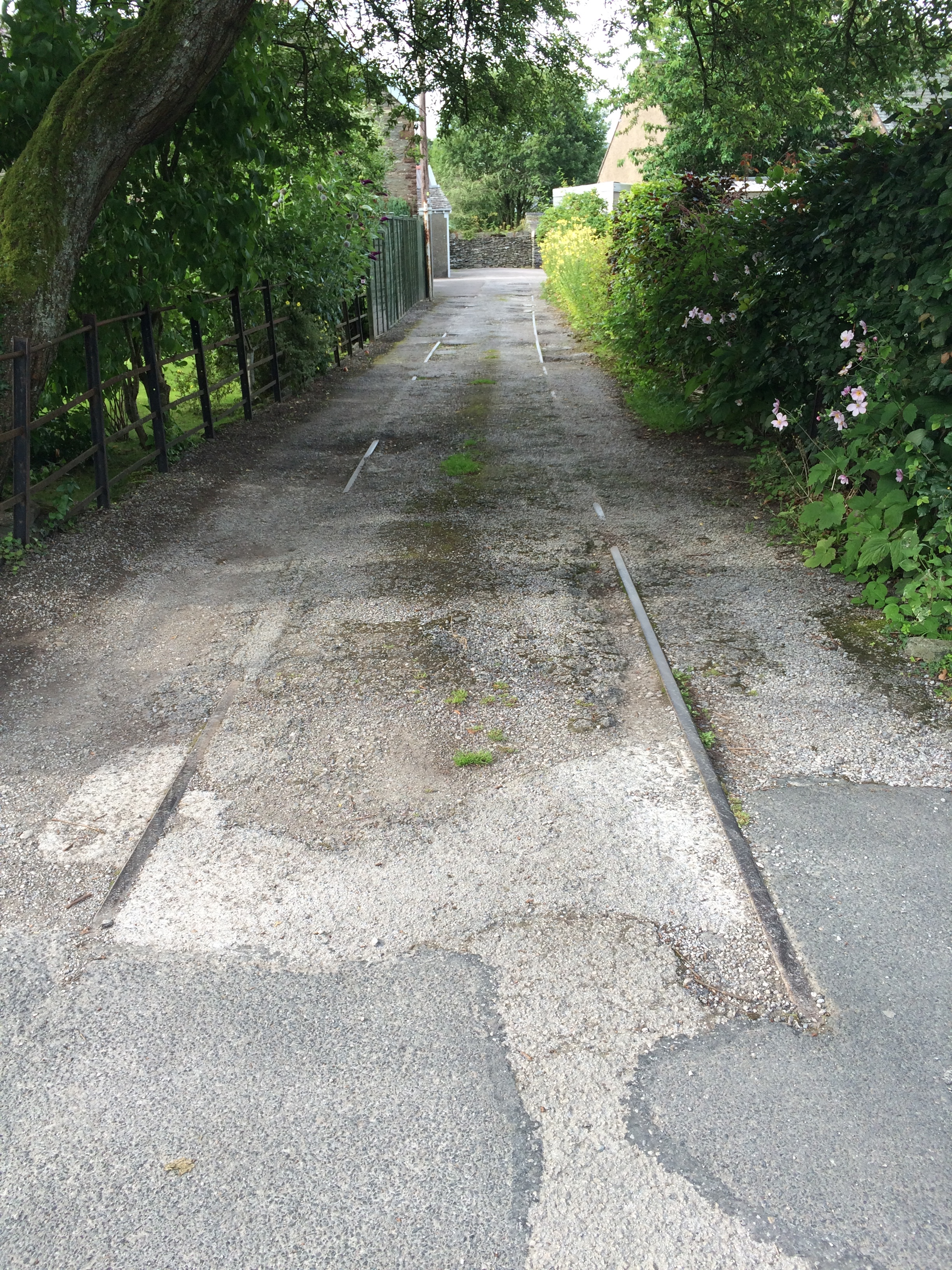
Track from the tramway in Burneside.

The tramway was built in 1879-80 as a 3 ft 6 in (1,067 mm) line to connect the paper mills run by James Cropper and Co in Burneside and Cowan Head. Wagons were hauled by horse power.

It was converted to 4 ft 8 1/2 in (1,435 mm) in 1924, and in the same year, the Motor Rail and Tram Car Company in Bedford provided a 4wPM locomotive called Rachel which was used to transfer wagons between the mill and Burneside railway station. In 1951 Rachel was replaced by a diesel Ruston 48 No.294266.

The line to Cowan Head closed in 1965, with the section between Burneside Mill and Burneside railway station still operating until it closed in 1974.

Rachel has survived and is preserved at the Lakeside and Haverthwaite Railway.

The Ruston was named Flying Flea at Carnforth before moving south to Sir William McAlpine's Fawley Hill Railway, where it was named Sir William. The locomotive was not in regular use, and was sold on to Lawrie Rose, who moved the engine to the Mid-Suffolk Light Railway. The locomotive was renamed Sir William McAlpine by dowager Lady Judith McAlpine. The locomotive is now based at the Whitwell and Reepham Railway, and appears often on Lawrie's YouTube Channel.
