= Helsfell Hall =

Country house in Cumbria, England

Coordinates: 54.3376°N 2.7706°W

Helsfell Hall was a country house near Kentrigg in Cumbria. That part of the building which survives, and is now used as a barn, is a Grade II listed building.

== History ==
The house was built in the 16th century probably for Robert Briggs. The hall is mentioned in Cornelia Nicholson's The Annals of Kendal who documents that the seat of the Briggs family was "once a place of considerable importance." During the English Civil War in the 1640s, the Briggs family fought on the Parliamentary side (Colonel Edward Briggs was a magistrate). After the war the Philipsons of Hollin Hall, who were Royalists, stripped the Briggs family of all their local possessions, including Helsfell Hall, which was left to become derelict.
