= Strickland Roger =

Coordinates: 54.374935°N 2.770524°W

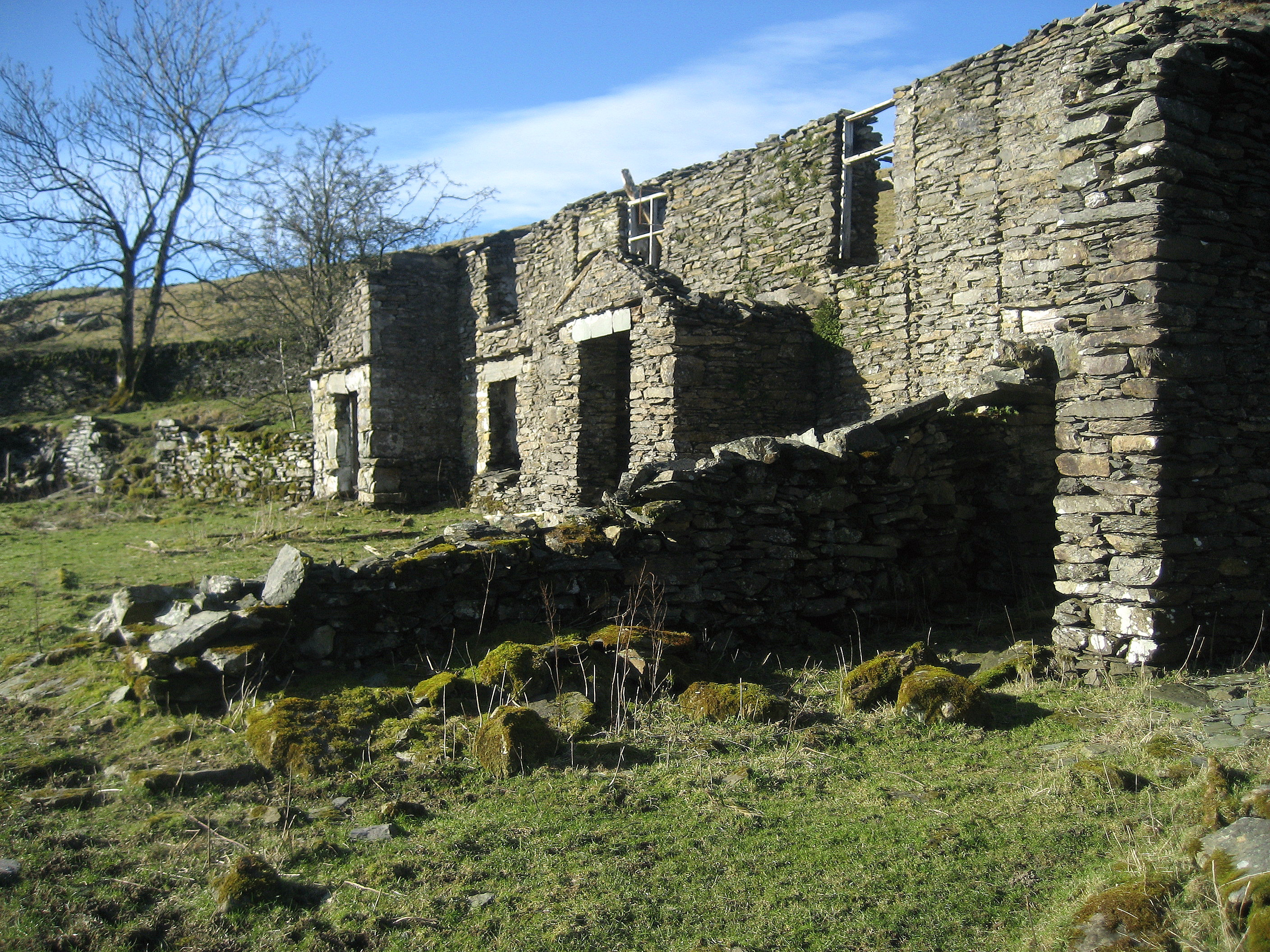
- Abandoned farmhouse at East View

- Location within Cumbria
- Population: 480 (2011 census)
- Civil parish: Strickland Roger
- Unitary authority: Westmorland and Furness
- Ceremonial county: Cumbria
- Region: North West
- Country: England
- Sovereign state: United Kingdom
- Police: Cumbria
- Fire: Cumbria
- Ambulance: North West

Strickland Roger is a civil parish in Westmorland and Furness, Cumbria, England. In the 2001 census the parish had a population of 544, decreasing at the 2011 census to 480. It lies north of Burneside and west of the A6 road, and is bordered by the parishes of Strickland Ketel to the south west, Nether Staveley and Kentmere to the west, Whitwell and Selside to the north, and Skelsmergh to the east. From 1974 to 2023 it was in South Lakeland district.

There are 16 listed buildings or structures in the parish, all at grade II.

== See also ==
- Listed buildings in Strickland Roger
