= Strickland Ketel =

Civil parish in Cumbria, England

Coordinates: 54.35°N 02.78°W

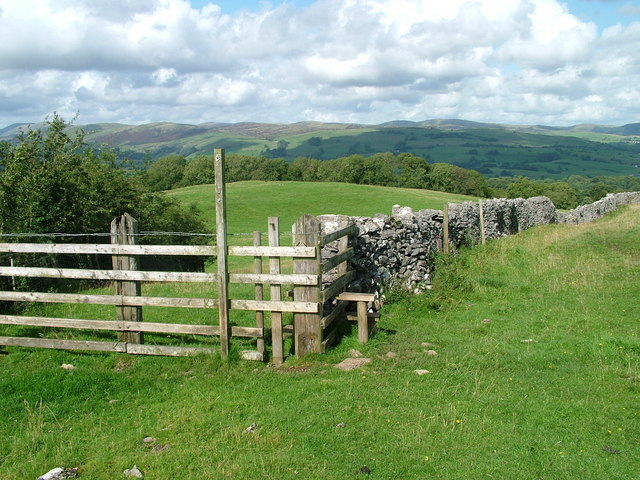
- Stile on Cunswick Scar

- Location in South Lakeland Location within Cumbria
- Population: 1,105 (2011)
- Civil parish: Strickland Ketel
- Unitary authority: Westmorland and Furness
- Ceremonial county: Cumbria
- Region: North West
- Country: England
- Sovereign state: United Kingdom
- Post town: Kendal
- Postcode district: LA8, LA9
- Police: Cumbria
- Fire: Cumbria
- Ambulance: North West

Strickland Ketel (sometimes Strickland Kettle) is a civil parish in Westmorland and Furness, Cumbria, England. In the 2001 census the parish had a population of 1,093, increasing at the 2011 census to 1,105. It borders the north west of Kendal, on both sides of the A591 road, and is also bordered by the parishes of Underbarrow and Bradleyfield to the south west, Crook to the west, Nether Staveley to the north west, Strickland Roger to the north east, and Skelsmergh to the east.

There are 16 listed buildings or structures in the parish, all at grade II.

The parish includes the larger part of the village of Burneside, which straddles the border with Strickland Roger.

== See also ==
- Listed buildings in Strickland Ketel
