= Listed buildings in Skelsmergh and Scalthwaiterigg =

Skelsmergh and Scalthwaiterigg is a civil parish in the Westmorland and Furness district of Cumbria, England. It contains eight listed buildings that are recorded in the National Heritage List for England. All the listed buildings are designated at Grade II, the lowest of the three grades, which is applied to "buildings of national importance and special interest". The parish contains the village of Skelsmergh, and is otherwise rural. The listed buildings consist of houses and associated structures, a chapel, a road bridge and a railway overbridge, and two mileposts

== Buildings ==
Name and location	Photograph	Date	Notes
Skelsmergh Hall; 54.35654°N 2.72213°W		15th century	Two houses and an outbuilding that originated as a pele tower, with extensions in the 16th and 17th centuries. The building is in stone, partly roughcast, and has slate roofs. The tower, now an outbuilding, has three storeys, and is gabled on two sides. The 17th-century range has mullioned and transomed windows, and there is also a garderobe with slit windows.
Benson Hall; 54.34158°N 2.70884°W	—	16th century (probable)	A farmhouse that was extended in the 18th and 19th centuries, it is in stone with a slate roof. The west front has three storeys and three bays, and there is a single-storey gabled extension to the rear. Most of the windows are sashes, and there is a round-headed stair window at the rear.
Burton House, barn and outbuilding 54.36133°N 2.72728°W	—	17th century (probable)	The building is in stone with slate roofs. The house has two storeys and two bays, a gabled porch with rounded angles, and casement windows. To the south is a barn with a ramp leading up to the entrance, a gabled wing to the west, and an outshut to the east. To the north is an outbuilding with a doorway, a window, and a loading door.
Chapel of SS Robert and Alice and Presbytery; 54.35167°N 2.71965°W	—	Mid to late 17th century	Originally an H-shaped house, it was left to the Roman Catholic church in 1723, and converted into a chapel. It is in roughcast stone with a slate roof. The building has two storeys, an east front of three bays, and a south front of two bays. Most of the windows are sashes, there are some casement windows, and there is a gabled porch with a segmental-headed entrance.
Laverock Bridge; 54.35008°N 2.71599°W		17th or 18th century (probable)	The bridge carries a road over River Mint. It is in stone and consists of a single segmental arch. The bridge has a band, low parapets, abutments that curve outwards, and a carriageway about 3 metres (9.8 ft) wide.
Milepost near Stocks Mill; 54.36500°N 2.72525°W	—	1825	The milepost is on the west side of the A6 road, and is in cast iron. It was provided for the Heron Syke to Eamont Bridge turnpike road. The milepost is half-hexagonal and has fluted faces and a domed cap. It is inscribed with the distances in miles to Shap and to Kendal.
Milepost at SD 524 980; 54.37578°N 2.73420°W	—	1825	The milepost is on the west side of the A6 road, and is in cast iron. It was provided for the Heron Syke to Eamont Bridge turnpike road. The milepost is half-hexagonal and has fluted faces and a domed cap. It is inscribed with the distances in miles to Shap and to Kendal.
Railway overbridge 54.34993°N 2.70717°W	—	c.1846	The bridge was built by the Lancaster and Carlisle Railway, later the West Coast Main Line, whose engineer was Joseph Locke. It carries Paddy Lane over the railway, and is in limestone. The bridge consists of a single round arch with voussoirs, a band, an impost band, and a coped parapet.
