= Listed buildings in Selside and Fawcett Forest =

Selside and Fawcett Forest is a civil parish in the Westmorland and Furness district of Cumbria, England. It contains 22 listed buildings that are recorded in the National Heritage List for England. Of these, one is listed at Grade II*, the middle of the three grades, and the others are at Grade II, the lowest grade. The parish contains the village of Selside and smaller settlements, and is otherwise rural. The listed buildings consist of houses, farmhouses and farm buildings, bridges, mileposts, and a church.

== Key ==
| Grade | Criteria |
|---|---|
| II* | Particularly important buildings of more than special interest |
| II | Buildings of national importance and special interest |

== Buildings ==
| Name and location | Photograph | Date | Notes | Grade |
|---|---|---|---|---|
| Selside Hall and outbuilding 54.38476°N 2.71813°W | — | Late 14th century | The house was later altered and extended. It is in roughcast stone with ashlar dressings and slate roofs. The house has an L-shaped plan and is mainly in two storeys. The east front has five bays, the outer bays projecting and gabled, and it contains a gabled porch with pointed openings. The south wing has thick walls and four bays. To the north is a single-storey extension with a projecting wing. The windows vary; some are mullioned, some are casements, and others are sashes. Inside the house is an inglenook and a bressumer. | II* |
| Borrowdale Head Farmhouse and barn 54.43040°N 2.70453°W | — | 17th century (probable) | The farmhouse and barn are in stone with a slate roof. The house has two storeys and two bays. On the front is a gabled porch, the windows in the ground floor are sashes, and in the upper floor they are casements. In the east front of the barn are five small openings, a blocked entrance and a winnowing door, and on the north side is the entrance to a cow shed. On the west side is an outshut, an outhouse, and a ramp leading up to an entrance. | II |
| Barn, Bannisdale Head; 54.43157°N 2.74921°W | — | 17th century (probable) | The barn is in stone with a slate roof. It has a barn entrance and various smaller entrances, and on the east side is a later outshut. Inside is a cruck truss. | II |
| Bannisdale Head; 54.43145°N 2.74905°W | | Mid to late 17th century | A south wing was added to the house in the 19th century. The house is in roughcast stone with a slate roof and two storeys. The original range has three bays, the third bay projecting forward under a gable. There is a central gabled porch, the ground floor windows have segmental heads, there is a hood mould above them, and the upper floor windows have flat heads. The south wing has two bays, tall casement windows, and a gabled porch. | II |
| Brackenrigg Side and barn 54.38311°N 2.70925°W | — | 1674 | The house and barn are in stone with a slate roof. The house has two storeys and three bays, and the barn is attached to the left. On the front of the house is a gabled porch, and the windows are casements. The barn has various entrances and windows. | II |
| Watchgate; 54.38493°N 2.72787°W | — | Early 18th century (probable) | The rear wing was added in the 19th century. The house is in roughcast stone with a slate roof, and quoins in the rear wing. There are two storeys and a south front of three bays. On the front is a gabled porch and sash windows, those in the ground floor having hood moulds. The windows in the rear wing are casements. | II |
| Browfoot Barn; 54.37521°N 2.70276°W | — | Early to mid 18th century (probable) | A bank barn in stone with quoins and a Cumberland slate roof. There are two storeys, a main range of three bays, and a two-bay wing, giving an L-shaped plan. In the south front is a porch and wagon entrance with a segmental head and voussoirs, and elsewhere are other doorways. | II |
| Bannisdale High Bridge; 54.40387°N 2.70847°W | | 18th century (probable) | The bridge carries a road, originally the Heron Syke to Eamont Bridge turnpike road, over Bannisdale Beck. It is in stone and consists of a single segmental arch with a roadway 8 metres (26 ft) wide. The bridge has irregular voussoirs, and parapets with dressed coping. | II |
| Borrowdale Head Bridge; 54.43059°N 2.70366°W | — | 18th century (probable) | The bridge carries a track over Borrow Beck. It is in stone, it consists of a single segmental arch with voussoirs, and is about 2.5 metres (8 ft 2 in) wide. There are iron railings, but no parapets. | II |
| Crookdale Bridge; 54.44335°N 2.69508°W | — | 18th century (probable) | The bridge carries a road over Crookdale Beck. It is in stone and consists of a single segmental arch. The bridge has thin voussoirs, low parapets, and is about 3.5 metres (11 ft) wide. It was on the route of the Heron Syke to Eamont Bridge turnpike road. | II |
| Crookdale Low Bridge; 54.43111°N 2.69276°W | — | 18th century (probable) | The bridge carries a track over Crookdale Beck. It is in stone and consists of a single segmental arch. The bridge has thin voussoirs, low parapets, and is about 3.5 metres (11 ft) wide. | II |
| Garnett Bridge; 54.38660°N 2.73501°W | | 18th century | The bridge carries a narrow road over the River Sprint. It is in limestone and consists of a single arch over a natural gorge. | II |
| High Borrow Bridge; 54.42983°N 2.69508°W | | 18th century (probable) | The bridge carries a road over Borrow Beck, it is in stone and consists of a single segmental arch. The bridge has thin voussoirs, a plain parapet with upright stones forming coping, and is about 3.5 metres (11 ft) wide. It was on the route of the Heron Syke to Eamont Bridge turnpike road. | II |
| Outbuilding, Borrowdale Head Farm; 54.43043°N 2.70433°W | — | 18th or 19th century (probable) | A small stone building with a slate roof, two storeys, and a north lean-to. On the west side is a gable and an entrance with a canopy, in the south wall is a small window, and on the east side are external steps leading up to an entrance. | II |
| Bannisdale Low Bridge; 54.40341°N 2.70602°W | — | 1820s | The bridge carries the A6 road over Bannisdale Beck. It is in stone and consists of a single round arch with flanking piers. The bridge has a band, coped parapets, and abutments on the west side that curve forward. The roadway is about 9 metres (30 ft) wide. | II |
| Milepost opposite Memorial Hall; 54.39840°N 2.70955°W | | 1825 | The milepost was provided for the Heron Syke to Eamont Bridge turnpike road. It is in cast iron, and is half-hexagonal with concave faces and a domed top. The panels are inscribed with the distances in miles to Shap and to Kendal. | II |
| Milepost near North Gateside; 54.38897°N 2.72738°W | | 1825 | The milepost was provided for the Heron Syke to Eamont Bridge turnpike road. It is in cast iron, and is half-hexagonal with concave faces and a domed top. The panels are inscribed with the distances in miles to Shap and to Kendal. | II |
| Milepost at NY 552 042; 54.43215°N 2.69113°W | — | 1825 | The milepost was provided for the Heron Syke to Eamont Bridge turnpike road, now the A6 road. It is in cast iron and has a half hexagonal plan with fluted faces and a domed cap. The date is on the front face, and the other faces are inscribed with the distances in miles to Shap and to Kendal. | II |
| Milepost near Forest Hall; 54.40742°N 2.69481°W | — | 1825 | The milepost was provided for the Heron Syke to Eamont Bridge turnpike road, now the A6 road. It is in cast iron and has a half hexagonal plan with fluted faces and a domed cap. The date is on the front face, and the other faces are inscribed with the distances in miles to Shap and to Kendal. | II |
| Huck's Bridge; 54.42904°N 2.69110°W | | 1826 | The bridge carries the A6 road over Crookdale Beck. It is in stone, and consists of two round arches, the piers having triangular cutwaters. The bridge has plain parapets, a band on the east side, and raking abutments. Originally about 9 metres (30 ft) wide, it has been widened to about 15.5 metres (51 ft). | II |
| St Thomas' Church; 54.38623°N 2.71675°W | | 1838 | The church was rebuilt on the site of an earlier church. In 1894 it was restored by C. J. Ferguson, and the tower was added. The church is in stone, the body roughcast, and the roof slated. It consists of a nave, a porch, a north organ loft, and a west tower. The tower has bands, an embattled parapet, a squat pyramidal roof with a weathervane, and a stair turret at the south. The porch is gabled and has a Tudor arched doorway, and the windows are lancets. | II |
| Outbuilding, Selside Hall; 54.38468°N 2.71786°W | — | 19th century (probable) | The outbuilding is in stone with a slate roof and three bays. The first two bays have pigstys in the ground floor and hen houses above. The third bay projects and contains an entrance. On the north side are steps leading to an upper floor doorway. | II |
