= Skelsmergh =

Coordinates: 54.3553°N 2.7265°W

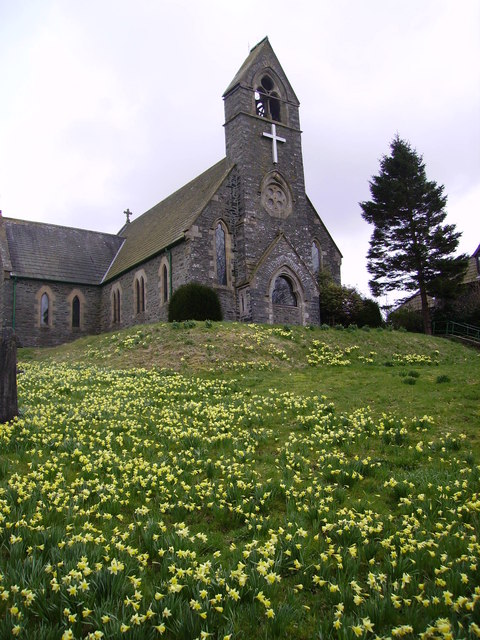
- St. John the Baptist Church

- Location in South Lakeland Location within Cumbria
- Population: 303 (2011 census)
- OS grid reference: SD535955
- Civil parish: Skelsmergh and Scalthwaiterigg
- Unitary authority: Westmorland and Furness
- Ceremonial county: Cumbria
- Region: North West
- Country: England
- Sovereign state: United Kingdom
- Post town: KENDAL
- Postcode district: LA8
- Dialling code: 01539
- Police: Cumbria
- Fire: Cumbria
- Ambulance: North West
- UK Parliament: Westmorland and Lonsdale

Skelsmergh is a small village and former civil parish, now in the parish of Skelsmergh and Scalthwaiterigg, in Westmorland and Furness in rural Cumbria, England, about 4 miles (6.4 km) north of Kendal, on the A6 road.

St. John the Baptist Church at Skelsmergh dates from about 1871. Skelsmergh Hall incorporates a pele tower, probably built in 1425, with late 16th century and early 17th century additions. The tower is now an outbuilding. The River Sprint runs alongside the village and is "one of the quietest of the Lake District's valleys".

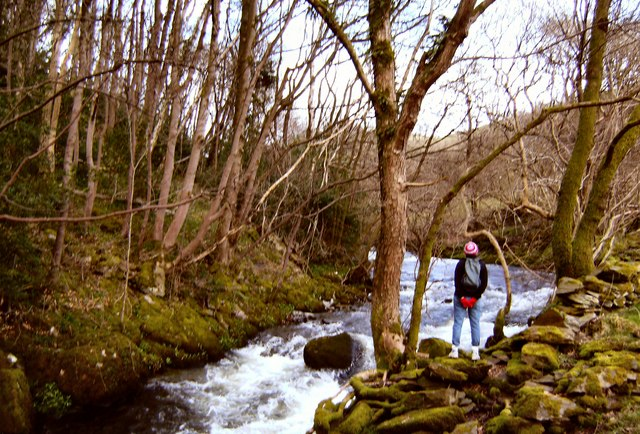
The River Sprint

Skelsmergh had a population of 303 in 2011, up from 250 in 1961. In 1887 it had a population of 367.

From 1866 Skelsmergh was a civil parish in its own right until it was abolished on 1 April 2015 and merged with Scalthwaiterigg to form "Skelsmergh and Scalthwaiterigg".

It previously had a joint parish council with the adjacent parish of Scalthwaiterigg.

== Parish Church ==
Skelsmergh church parish was created in the 19th century to serve the townships of Skelsmergh, Scalthwaiterigg and Patton. The entrance to the churchyard is a monument to those who died from the parish during World War I.

The church, St. John the Baptist, dates from about 1871 and was built by Joseph Bintley, a Westmorland architect. Situated in the nave are two stained glass windows.

It is thought there was a church on or near the site for many centuries. Rev Thomas Machell, an antiquarian, mentions a ruined chapel in his report on the area in 1692. In 1870 a local group, the Skelsmergh Chapelry Committee, was set up to raise money and promote the building of the church. The foundation stone was laid by Venerable J Cooper on 5 May 1870. The church was complete by 1870, and consecrated on 2 November 1870 by the Bishop of Carlisle.

== Population ==
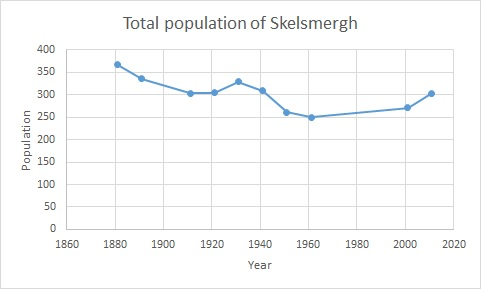
Population graph of Skelsmergh over time using census data

In 1881 the total population was 367 which was an increase of 17 from 10 years before. However, in the following 20 years the population decreased, from 336 in 1891 to 303 in 1901. The population rose to 329 in 1921, then decreased again to 250 in 1961. The 2011 census data for Skelsmergh in 2011 showed the population at 303.

In 1881 there were 197 men and 170 women. From 1911 there were more women than men. In the 1961 census report there were equal numbers of men and women, at 125 each. The 2011 census data showed 161 men and 142 women.

== Jobs ==
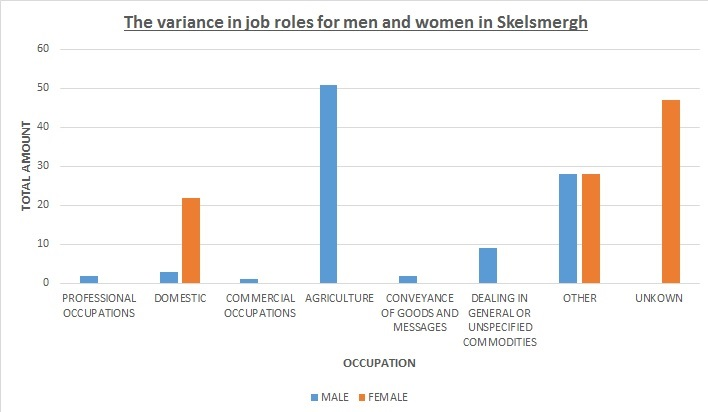
Occupations in 1881

The 2011 census showed that of the village's residents aged 16 to 74, 161 were in employment. 21.7% of the working population had 'Professional Occupations', and 11.2% were 'Managers, Directors or senior officials'.

In 1881, the majority of men worked in agriculture, while women carried out domestic work.

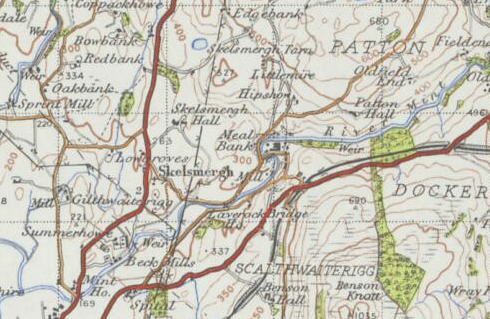
Skelsmergh map snippet

== Education and housing ==
2011 census data showed there were 14 full-time students in Skelsmergh, 64% of whom were economically active.

In 1881 there were 66 houses in Skelsmergh. This rose to 81 houses in 1931, then dropped to 72 in 1961. 2011 census data put the number of houses at 136, out of 46,552 houses in the South Lakeland region. Of those 136 houses, 125 were classified as a whole house or bungalow.

== Religion and ethnicity ==
The 2011 census data showed that 178 people of the 303 total population were Christian, 86 had no religion, 36 did not state their religion, two people were Jewish and one was Buddhist.

The 2011 census data showed that 284 of the residents were classified as 'White; English/Welsh/Scottish/Northern Irish/British', 15 as 'White; Other White' and four as 'White; Irish'.

== See also ==
- Listed buildings in Skelsmergh
