= River Mint =

River in Cumbria, England

Coordinates: 54°20′N 2°44′W

Mint
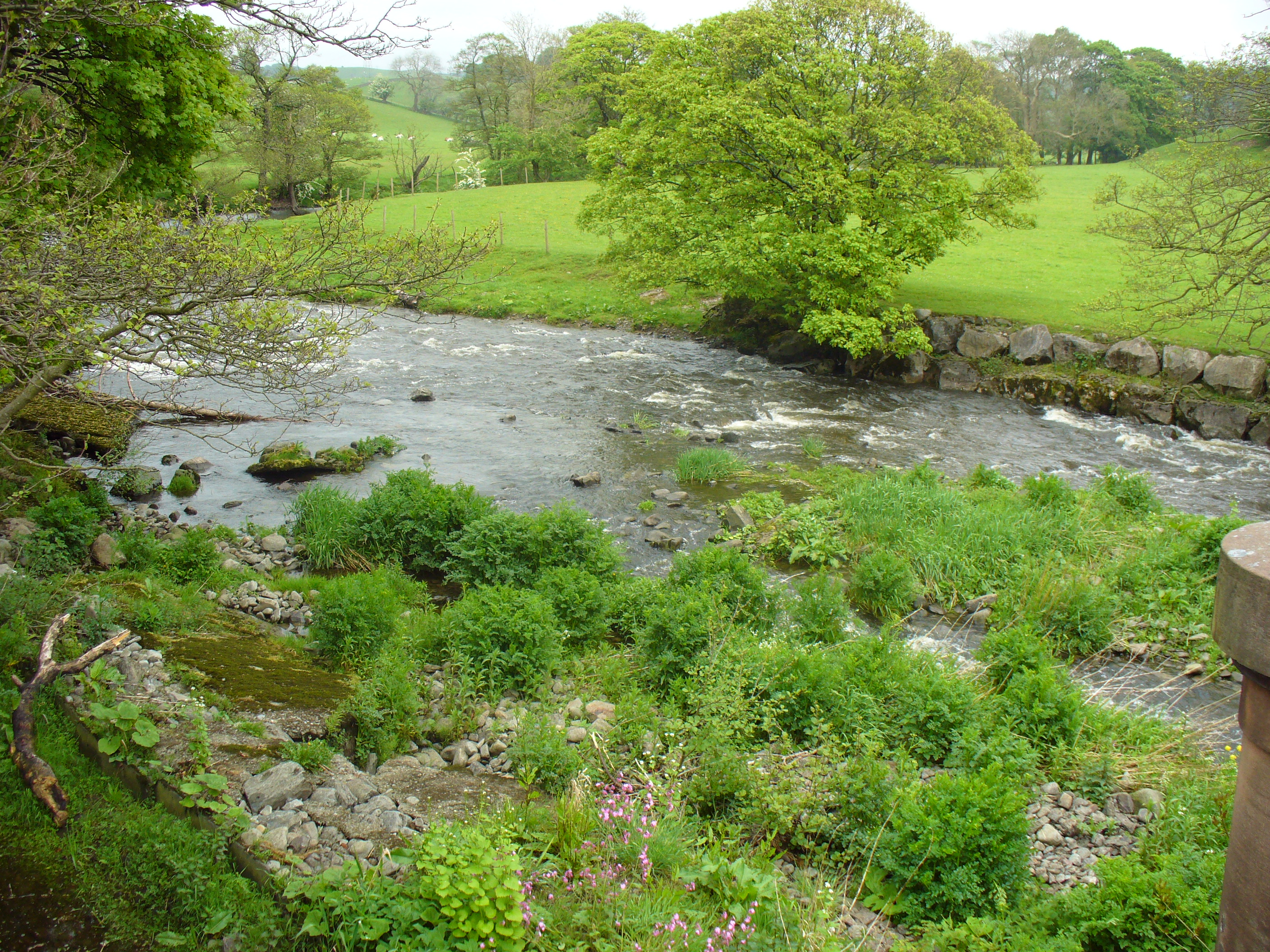
- Mint upstream of Mintsfeet

Location
- Country: England

Physical characteristics
- Source
  - location: confluence with Bannisdale Beck and unnamed watercourse
- Mouth
  - location: confluence with River Kent at a point between Mintsfeet and Kentrigg just north of Kendal

The River Mint is a river in Cumbria, England. It is a tributary of the River Kent.

== Description ==
The Mint starts life at Whelpside at the confluence of Bannisdale Beck, running south-east from Bannisdale Head, and a smaller stream draining a group of small valleys from headwaters in The Forest, Combs Hollow and Mabbin Crag.

The river runs south to Patton Bridge, picking up a series of smaller tributaries, before turning south west, continuing through the hamlet of Meal Bank.

The Mint drains into the River Kent between Mintsfeet and Kentrigg just north of Kendal.
