= Burneside =

Village in Cumbria, England

Coordinates: 54.3556°N 2.7628°W

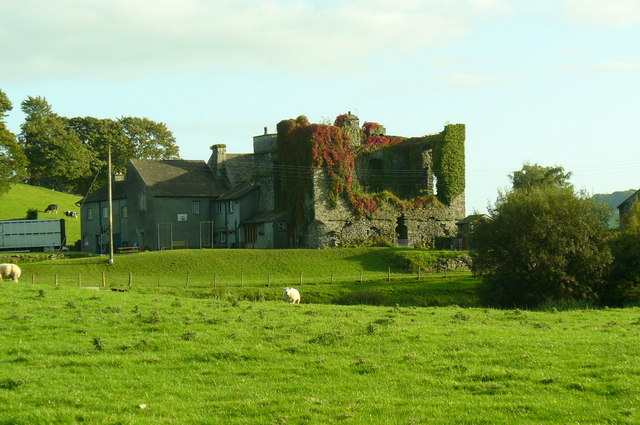
- Burneside Hall

- Location in South Lakeland Location within Cumbria
- Population: 1,888 (2011.Ward)
- OS grid reference: SD515925
- Civil parish: Strickland Ketel
- Unitary authority: Westmorland and Furness
- Ceremonial county: Cumbria
- Region: North West
- Country: England
- Sovereign state: United Kingdom
- Post town: KENDAL
- Postcode district: LA9
- Dialling code: 01539
- Police: Cumbria
- Fire: Cumbria
- Ambulance: North West
- UK Parliament: Westmorland and Lonsdale

Burneside (/ˈbɜːrnisaɪd/) is a small village in Westmorland and Furness, Cumbria, England. It is located to the north of Kendal and to the south east of Staveley, on the River Kent, just upstream from the confluence of the River Sprint. It has about 3,000 inhabitants. By the time of the 2011, Census Burneside had been transformed into an electoral ward only. The population of this ward was 1,888. The village is split between the civil parishes of Strickland Ketel, to the west of the River Kent, and Strickland Roger to the east.

Burneside railway station is situated on the Windermere Branch Line, with services to Windermere to the north west, Oxenholme on the West Coast Main Line, and Lancaster to the south. Burneside is around 10 miles (16 km) from the M6 motorway.

== Politics ==
In 1974, under the Local Government Act 1972, Burneside became a part of the South Lakeland district. In 2023 South Lakeland became part of the Westmorland and Furness unitary authority, whose administrative centre is Kendal.

Burneside is part of Westmorland and Lonsdale constituency for which Tim Farron is the current member of parliament (as of 2024), a member of the Liberal Democrats.

Before Brexit in 2020, its residents voted to elect MEP's for the North West England constituency of the European Parliament.

== Economy ==
Burneside's economy is based upon the James Cropper plc paper mill, founded in 1845 by James Cropper. A short tramway, the Burneside Paper Mills Tramway, linked the mill to Burneside station. Originally, most villagers worked in the factory. Until the year 2000 James Cropper (a descendant of the original James Cropper) owned a large proportion of the village; it was then sold to housing agencies.

New Routes Adventure Company is run from Burneside, offering climbing and walking in the surrounding area.

== Current village ==
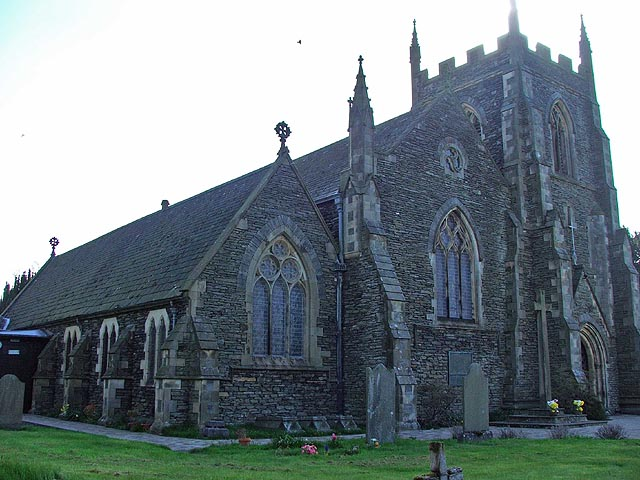
St Oswald's Church

Burneside has two main estates, Hall Park and Chapel Fields, which have a mix of private and rented accommodation.

The village has one grocery store and one bakery. It has a pub named the Jolly Anglers and a chip shop. The village also has a cricket club with a licensed club house on Hollins Lane as well as a football club situated opposite that uses the cricket club facilities after games.

Burneside's only church is St Oswald's Church. This Anglican church is mainly the product of a rebuild in the 1880s, although there was an earlier church on the present site designed by George Webster.

The only school in the village is St. Oswald's primary school, which is Church of England. The Bryce Institute is a key feature of the village allowing locals to participate in many social events. The Bryce Institute was built in 1896 and in 1918 was used as a bathhouse; it is now used for many local events.

== Burneside Hall ==
Burneside Hall lies just on the outskirts of Burneside. It is a ruined 14th-century pele tower now attached to a farm house and outbuildings. The fortification of the house was licensed in 1341 when the tower and a gatehouse were built.

There is a long south wing, and a shorter oblong north wing, which is in fact a pele tower. There are two tunnel-vaulted chambers at ground level, separated by a narrow tunnel-vaulted passage. The hall became the property of Richard de Bellingham of Northumberland when he married Margaret, the heiress of Gilbert de Burneshead. Their descendants remained living in the hall for the next 200 years or so.

Most of the 14th-century tower still survives, together with some of the original enclosing wall of the barmkin, or fortified courtyard. This area would have been used to house and protect cattle in the event of a raid or an attack. Today, the hall and its grounds are accessed along a narrow driveway from the road below it. Entrance would have been through a gatehouse from the 16th century onwards; that still stands intact but with broken windows. The original heavy oak doors to the gatehouse can still be seen, albeit off their hinges now and leaning against the interior wall.

The hall and its attendant buildings are from different dates. The pele tower was built by the Burnesheads in the 14th century. Its basement is divided into two cellars, connected by a tunnel passing right through the tower. Apparently this is an architecturally unique feature for a pele tower. The walls of the pele tower were originally around 1.2 metres thick. No traces of the embattled parapets survive. There was a special enclosure directly outside the tower, possibly for the protection of horses.

Attached to the rear of the pele tower is the Great Hall, probably built during the 16th century. This part of the building was built by the Bellinghams, and was enlarged during the 17th century by the Braithwaites.

A 2019 dendrochronological analysis report for Historic England dated 39 timbers from the hall, with timber for the hall roof dating as felled from the mid fifteenth century to the early sixteenth century, with later timbers in the building date from early seventeenth century.

== Transport ==
=== Train ===
The village has a railway station with services run by Northern to Windermere, Oxenholme Lake District, Lancaster, Preston, Manchester Airport.

=== Bus ===
Bus services is operated by Stagecoach. Service 45 begins in the village running to Kendal.

== See also ==
- Listed buildings in Strickland Ketel
- Margaret Cropper (poet)
