= List of churches in the Diocese of Carlisle =

The following is a list of churches in the Diocese of Carlisle, which covers all of the modern county of Cumbria apart from a small area around the town of Alston and the Sedbergh area.

== Extra-parochial areas ==
- Abbey Within (population 0): Cathedral of the Holy & Undivided Trinity, Carlisle (medieval)
- Birkrigg Common (population 0)
- Skiddaw Forest (population 0)

== Archdeaconry of Carlisle ==
=== Deanery and Mission Community of Appleby ===
- Benefice of High Westmorland
  - Parish of Bampton with Mardale (population 288)
    - St Patrick's Church, Bampton (medieval, rebuilt 1727)
    - Holy Trinity Church, Mardale (1596, flooded 1937)
  - Parish of Orton with Tebay (population 1,390)
    - All Saints' Church, Orton (medieval)
    - St James's Church, Tebay (1880)
  - Parish of Ravenstonedale with Newbiggin-on-Lune (population 567)
    - St Oswald's Church, Ravenstonedale (medieval, rebuilt 1744)
    - St Aiden's Church, Newbiggin-on-Lune (1892, closed 1984)
  - Parish of Shap with Swindale (population 1,312)
    - St Michael's Church, Shap (medieval)
    - Swindale Chapel (pre-C18th, closed 1937)
- Benefice of Heart of Eden
  - Parish of Appleby (population 3,963)
    - St Lawrence's Church (medieval)
    - St John the Baptist's Church, Murton and Hilton (1856)
    - St Michael's Church (medieval, closed 1974)
    - Colby Mission Church (C19th, closed C20th)
  - Parish of Asby (population 279)
    - St Peter's Church (medieval)
    - St Leonard's Chapel, Little Asby (medieval, closed Middle Ages)
  - Parish of Dufton (population 327)
    - St Cuthbert's Church (medieval, rebuilt 1784)
    - Knock Mission Room (1905, closed)
  - Parish of Kirkby Thore (population 776): St Michael's Church (medieval)
  - Parish of Long Marton (population 601): SS Margaret & James's Church (medieval)
  - Parish of Milburn (population 194): St Cuthbert's Church (medieval)
  - Parish of Newbiggin (population 80): St Edmund's Church (medieval)
  - Parish of Ormside (population 170): St James's Church, Great Ormside (medieval)
  - Parish of Temple Sowerby (population 494): St James's Church (medieval, rebuilt 1770)
  - Parish of Warcop with Musgrave (population 704)
    - St Columba's Church, Warcop (medieval)
    - St Theobald's Church, Musgrave (medieval, rebuilt 1845)
    - Bleatarn Chapel (medieval?, rebuilt 1865)
- Benefice of North Westmorland
  - Parish of Askham with Lowther (population 774)
    - St Peter's Church, Askham (medieval, rebuilt 1832)
    - St Michael's Church, Lowther (medieval, closed 2024)
  - Parish of Bolton (population 481): All Saints' Church (medieval)
  - Parish of Clifton with Brougham (population 1,291)
    - St Cuthbert's Church, Clifton (medieval)
    - St Ninian's Church, Brougham (medieval, rebuilt 1660, closed 1977)
    - St Wilfrid's Church, Brougham (medieval chapel, rebuilt 1658, closed 2023)
    - St John's Mission Chapel, Eamont Bridge (1871, closed 1932)
  - Parish of Crosby Ravensworth (population 522): St Lawrence's Church (medieval)
  - Parish of Great Strickland (population 250): St Barnabas' Church (1870)
  - Parish of Morland (population 1,243)
    - St Laurence's Church (medieval)
    - St Cuthbert's Church, Cliburn (medieval)
    - St Mary's Church, Little Strickland (medieval, rebuilt 1814)
    - Thrimby Chapel (C16th, closed 1814)
- Benefice of Upper Eden
  - Parish of Brough with Stainmore (population 1,269)
    - St Michael's Church, Brough (medieval)
    - St Stephen's Church, Stainmore (1608, rebuilt 1843)
    - St Mary's Church, Stainmore (1861, closed 1972)
  - Parish of Kirkby Stephen with Mallerstang and Crosby Garrett with Soulby (population 3,014)
    - St Stephen's Church, Kirkby Stephen (medieval)
    - St Mary's Church, Mallerstang (medieval, rebuilt 1663)
    - St Andrew's Church, Crosby Garrett (medieval)
    - St Luke's Church, Soulby (1662, closed 2005)

=== Deanery and Mission Community of Brampton ===
- Benefice of Bewcastle, Stapleton and Kirklinton with Hethersgill
  - Parish of Bewcastle (population 391): St Cuthbert's Church (medieval, rebuilt 1792)
  - Parish of Kirklinton with Hethersgill (population 720)
    - St Cuthbert's Church, Kirklinton (medieval, rebuilt 1846)
    - St Mary's Church, Hethersgill (1876)
  - Parish of Stapleton (population 398): St Mary's Church (medieval, rebuilt 1830)
- Benefice of Eden, Gelt & Irthing
  - Parish of Brampton (population 4,476)
    - St Martin's New Church (1789, rebuilt 1878)
    - St Martin's Old Church (medieval, closed 1978)
  - Parish of Castle Carrock (population 317): St Peter's Church (medieval, rebuilt 1828)
  - Parish of Crosby-on-Eden (population 821): St John the Evangelist's Church (medieval, rebuilt 1854)
  - Parish of Cumrew (population 208): St Mary the Virgin's Church (medieval, rebuilt 1890)
  - Parish of Cumwhitton (population 271): St Mary the Virgin's Church (medieval)
  - Parish of Farlam (population 740)
    - St Thomas a Becket's Church (medieval, rebuilt 1860)
    - Tindale Mission Church (C19th?, closed C21st)
  - Parish of Hayton (population 912): St Mary Magdalene's Church (medieval, rebuilt 1780)
  - Parish of Irthington (population 764): St Kentigern's Church (medieval)
  - Parish of Scaleby (population 347): All Saints' Church (medieval)
  - Parish of Talkin (population 187): Talkin Chapel (1842)
- Benefice of Esk
  - Parish of Arthuret (population 2,567): St Michael & All Angels' Church (medieval, rebuilt 1609)
  - Parish of Kirkandrews-on-Esk (population 456): St Andrew's Church (medieval, rebuilt 1776)
  - Parish of Nicholforest (population 337)
    - St Nicholas' Church (C17th, rebuilt 1866)
    - Easton Parish Church (medieval, closed Middle Ages)
- Benefice of Holme Eden and Wetheral with Warwick
  - Parish of Holme Eden (population 1,937): St Paul's Church, Holme Eden, Warwick Bridge (1845)
  - Parish of Wetheral with Warwick (population 2,121)
    - Holy Trinity & St Constantine's Church, Wetheral (medieval, rebuilt C16th)
    - St Leonard's Church, Warwick-on-Eden (medieval, closed 2017)
- Benefice of Lanercost, Walton, Gilsland and Nether Denton
  - Parish of Gilsland (population 584)
    - St Mary Magdalene's Church (1851)
    - Upper Denton Parish Church (medieval, closed late 1970s)
  - Parish of Lanercost with Kirkcambeck and Walton (population 784)
    - Priory Church of St Mary Magdalene, Lanercost (medieval)
    - St Mary's Church, Walton (medieval, rebuilt 1869)
    - Lees Hill Mission Hall (C19th?, closed C21st)
    - St Kentigern's Church, Kirkcambeck (medieval, closed C20th)
  - Parish of Nether Denton (population 308): St Cuthbert's Church (medieval, rebuilt 1868)
- Benefice of Rockcliffe and Blackford
  - Parish of Blackford (population 561): St John the Baptist's Church (1870)
  - Parish of Rockcliffe (population 1,715): St Mary the Virgin's Church (medieval, rebuilt 1848)
- Benefice and Parish of Scotby and Cotehill with Cumwhinton (population 2,817)
  - All Saints' Church, Scotby (1854)
  - St John the Evangelist's Church, Cotehill (1868)
  - St John's Hall, Cumwhinton (C19th/20th, closed C21st)

=== Deanery of Carlisle ===
==== Mission Community of Carlisle Rural (part) ====
- Benefice of Dalston with Cumdivock, Ivegill, Raughton Head and Wreay
  - Parish of Dalston with Cumdivock (population 2,354)
    - St Michael's Church, Dalston (medieval)
    - St John the Evangelist's Church, Cumdivock (1870)
  - Parish of Ivegill (population 555): Christ Church (1868)
  - Parish of Raughton Head with Gaitsgill (population 497)
    - All Saints' Church, Raughton Head (medieval)
    - St Jude's Church, Gaitsgill (1869, closed 1970)
    - Highhead Chapel (medieval, rebuilt 1682, 1836, closed 1974)
  - Parish of Wreay (population 463): St Mary's Church (medieval)

==== Mission Community of Carlisle South ====
- Benefice and Parish of Carlisle St Herbert with St Stephen (population 5,353)
  - St Herbert's Church (1932)
  - St Stephen's Church (1865, closed 1964)
- Benefice and Parish of Harraby (population 10,705): St Elisabeth's Church (1954, rebuilt 1967)
- Benefice and Parish of Upperby (population 8,542): St John the Baptist's Church (1840)

==== Mission Community of Carlisle West ====
- Benefice and Parish of Carlisle St John the Evangelist (population 7,413)
  - St John the Evangelist's Church (1864)
  - St Andrew's Church, Botcherby (1890, part of Heart of the City Mission Community)
- Benefice and Parish of Houghton (population 5,075)
  - St John the Evangelist's Church, Houghton (1839)
  - St Peter's Church, Kingmoor (1930)

==== Mission Community of Heart of the City ====
- Benefice and Parish of Carlisle St Aidan and Christ Church (population 3,407)
  - St Aidan's Church (1899)
  - Christ Church (1828, closed 1938)
- Benefice and Parish of Carlisle St Cuthbert with St Mary (population 995)
  - St Cuthbert's Church (medieval)
  - St Mary's Church (1870, closed 1954)
  - St Paul's Church (1869, closed 1979)
  - Holy Trinity Chapel (medieval, closed Middle Ages)
  - St Alban's Church (medieval, closed 1549)

==== Mission Community of Two Rivers ====
- Benefice and Parish of Carlisle Holy Trinity and St Barnabas (population 15,317)
  - St Barnabas' Church (1899)
  - Holy Trinity Church (1830, closed 2022)
  - Sandsfield Fellowship (C20th, closed C21st)
- Benefice and Parish of Carlisle Morton (population 8,628): St Luke's Church (1958)
- Benefice and Parish of Denton Holme (population 5,990)
  - St James's Church, Carlisle (1865)
  - St James's Church, Cummersdale (1927, closed 2023)
- Benefice and Parish of Stanwix (population 9,095)
  - St Michael's Church, Stanwix (medieval, rebuilt 1841)
  - St Mark's Church, Belah (1951)
  - St Peter's Church, Linstock (medieval, closed Middle Ages)

=== Deanery of Penrith ===
==== Mission Community of Blencathra ====
- Benefice of Greystoke with Penruddock and Mungrisdale
  - Parish of Greystoke with Penruddock (population 1,298)
    - St Andrew's Church, Greystoke (medieval)
    - All Saints' Church, Penruddock (1901)
  - Parish of Mungrisdale (population 205): St Kentigern's Church (medieval)
- Benefice of Inglewood
  - Parish of Ainstable (population 381): St Michael & All Angels' Church (medieval)
  - Parish of Armathwaite (population 488): Christ & St Mary's Church (medieval)
  - Parish of Calthwaite (population 308): All Saints' Church (1913)
  - Parish of Hesket in the Forest (population 943): St Mary the Virgin's Church (medieval)
  - Parish of Hutton in the Forest (population 146): St James's Church (medieval)
  - Parish of Skelton (population 627): St Michael's Church (medieval)
  - Parish of Plumpton Wall (population 723): St John the Evangelist's Church (1907)

==== Mission Community of East of Eden ====
- Benefice of Cross Fell
  - Parish of Addingham (population 789)
    - St Michael's Church (C16th)
    - Old St Michael's Church (medieval, destroyed Middle Ages)
  - Parish of Culgaith (population 533): All Saints' Church (1756)
  - Parish of Edenhall (population 189): St Cuthbert's Church (medieval)
  - Parish of Kirkland (population 146): St Lawrence's Church (medieval)
  - Parish of Langwathby (population 607): St Peter's Church (medieval)
  - Parish of Melmerby (population 241): St John the Baptist's Church (medieval)
  - Parish of Ousby (population 265): St Luke's Church (medieval)
  - Parish of Skirwith (population 176): St John the Evangelist's Church (1856)
- Benefice of Kirkoswald, Renwick with Croglin, Great Salkeld and Lazonby
  - Parish of Great Salkeld (population 453): St Cuthbert's Church (medieval)
  - Parish of Kirkoswald (population 688): St Oswald's Church (medieval)
  - Parish of Lazonby (population 1,119): St Nicholas' Church (medieval)
  - Parish of Renwick with Croglin (population 314): All Saints' Church, Renwick (medieval)

==== Mission Community of Penrith ====
- Benefice of Penrith with Newton Reigny
  - Parish of Penrith (population 16,915)
    - St Andrew's Church (medieval, rebuilt except tower 1722)
    - Christ Church (1850)
  - Parish of Newton Reigny (population 438): St John's Church (medieval)

==== Mission Community of Ullswater ====
- Benefice of Barton, Pooley Bridge and Martindale
  - Parish of Barton (population 636): St Michael's Church (medieval)
  - Parish of Martindale (population 39)
    - St Martin's Church (medieval, rebuilt C16th)
    - St Peter's Church (1880)
  - Parish of Pooley Bridge (population 115): St Paul's Church (1868)
- Benefice of Dacre, Matterdale and Watermillock
  - Parish of Dacre (population 1,458): St Andrew's Church (medieval)
  - Parish of Matterdale (population 138): Matterdale Church (1570)
  - Parish of Watermillock (population 242)
    - All Saints' New Church (1558, rebuilt 1881)
    - All Saints' Old Church (medieval, destroyed C15th)
- Benefice and Parish of Patterdale (population 502): St Patrick's Church (medieval)

==== Closed churches in this deanery ====
Church	Founded	Closed
Little Salkeld Mission Church	C19th	1970
Hunsonby Mission Church	1905	1975
St John's, Gamblesby	1868	2002

== Archdeaconry of West Cumberland ==
=== Deanery of Calder ===
==== Mission Community of Coast to Fells ====
- Benefice and Parish of Crosslacon (population 10,171): St Michael's Church, Arlecdon (medieval) --- St Leonard's Church, Cleator (medieval) --- St John the Evangelist's Church, Cleator Moor (1870, closed 2017, services in village hall) --- St Paul's Church, Frizington (1868) --- Wath Brow Mission Church (1890, closed 2010)
- Benefice of Egremont and Haile
  - Parish of Egremont (population 8,859): SS Mary & Michael's Church (medieval) --- St John the Evangelist's Church, Bigrigg (1880) --- Thornhill Mission Church (1932)
  - Parish of Haile (population 336): Haile Parish Church (medieval)
- Benefice and Parish of Lamplugh with Ennerdale (population 965): St Michael's Church, Lamplugh (medieval) --- St Mary's Church, Ennerdale (medieval) --- Kirkland Mission Church (1886)
- Benefice and Parish of St Bees (population 2,220): Priory Church of SS Mary & Bega (medieval)

==== Mission Community of East Whitehaven ====
- Benefice and Parish of Hensingham (population 6,655): St John the Evangelist's Church (1791, rebuilt 1911) --- Keekle Mission Church (1875, closed 2013)
- Benefice and Parish of Mirehouse (population 3,946): St Andrew's Church (1955)
- Benefice and Parish of Moresby (population 3,446): St Bridget's Church (medieval) --- Moresby Parks Mission Church (1902, closed 2007)

==== Mission Community of South Calder ====
- Benefice of Seatallan
  - Parish of Calder Bridge and Ponsonby (population 276)
    - Old St Bridget's Church, Calder Bridge (medieval)
    - Ponsonby Parish Church (medieval)
    - New St Bridget's Church, Calder Bridge (1842, closed 2023)
  - Parish of Gosforth and Wasdale (population 1,239)
    - St Mary's Church, Gosforth (medieval)
    - St Michael & All Angels' Church, Nether Wasdale (medieval)
    - St Olaf's Church, Wasdale Head (C16th)
  - Parish of St John Beckermet (population 775): St John the Baptist's Church, Beckermet (medieval, rebuilt 1879)
  - Parish of Seascale (population 1,706): St Cuthbert's Church (1881, rebuilt 1890)
- Benefice of Western Lake District
  - Parish of Black Combe (population 1,839)
    - St Michael & All Angels' Church, Bootle (medieval)
    - St John the Baptist's Church, Corney (medieval)
    - St Mary's Church, Whicham (medieval)
    - St Mary's Church, Whitbeck (medieval)
  - Parish of Drigg (population 385): St Peter's Church (medieval, rebuilt 1850)
  - Parish of Eskdale (population 238)
    - St Catherine's Church, Boot (medieval, rebuilt 1881)
    - St Bega's Church, Eskdale Green (1890)
  - Parish of Irton (population 271): St Paul's Church (medieval, rebuilt 1856)
  - Parish of Muncaster (population 274)
    - St Michael & All Angels' Church (medieval)
    - Ravenglass Mission Room (C19th/20th, closed)
  - Parish of Waberthwaite (population 148): St John the Baptist's Church (medieval)

==== Mission Community of Whitehaven ====
- Benefice and Parish of Kells (population 5,058): St Peter's Church (1938)
- Benefice and Parish of Whitehaven (population 8,669)
  - St James's Church (1753)
  - St Nicholas' Chapel (medieval, rebuilt 1693)
  - Holy Trinity Church (1714, closed 1949)
  - Christ Church (1847, closed 1977)

=== Deanery of Derwent ===
Mission comm	Benefice	Parish	Church	Dates	Population
Binsey			St Cuthbert, Embleton	Medieval (1806)	3,904
Binsey			St John, Bassenthwaite	Medieval (1878)	3,904
Binsey			St Bega, Bassenthwaite	Ancient	3,904
Binsey			St Michael, Isel	Medieval	3,904
Binsey			St Barnabas, Setmurthy	Medieval (1794)	3,904
Binsey			All Saints, Boltongate	Medieval	3,904
Binsey			St James, Ireby	1845	3,904
Binsey			St James, Uldale	Medieval	3,904
Binsey			St Margaret, Wythop	1865	3,904
Binsey			All Saints, Allhallows	Medieval (1899)	3,904
Binsey			St Michael & All Angels, Torpenhow	Medieval	3,904
Binsey			St Cuthbert, Plumbland	Medieval (1871)	3,904
Grasmoor	Brigham, Clifton, Dean & Mosser	Clifton	St Luke, Clifton	1858	1,595
Grasmoor	Brigham, Clifton, Dean & Mosser	Brigham	St Bridget, Brigham	Medieval	1,716
Grasmoor	Brigham, Clifton, Dean & Mosser	Dean	St Oswald, Dean	Medieval	820
Grasmoor	Brigham, Clifton, Dean & Mosser	Mosser	St Philip, Mosser	1891	444
Grasmoor	Brigham, Clifton, Dean & Mosser	Mosser	St Michael, Mosser	Medieval (1773)	444
Grasmoor	Lorton & Loweswater w Buttermere	Lorton	St Cuthbert, Lorton	Medieval (1809)	300
Grasmoor	Lorton & Loweswater w Buttermere	Loweswater w Buttermere	St James, Buttermere	1507 (1840)	270
Grasmoor	Lorton & Loweswater w Buttermere	Loweswater w Buttermere	St Bartholomew, Loweswater	Medieval (1829)	270
Grasmoor	Cockermouth Area Team		All Saints, Cockermouth	Medieval (1854)	11,696
Grasmoor	Cockermouth Area Team		Christ Church, Cockermouth	1865	11,696
Grasmoor	Cockermouth Area Team		St Bridget, Bridekirk	Medieval (1868)	11,696
Grasmoor	Cockermouth Area Team		Christ Church, Great Broughton	1856	11,696
Keswick	Crosthwaite Keswick		St Kentigern, Crosthwaite	Ancient (1523)	1,777
Keswick	Crosthwaite Keswick		Underskiddaw Parish Room	1829	1,777
Keswick	Upper Derwent		Newlands Church	C16th (1845)	629
Keswick	Upper Derwent		St Mary, Thornthwaite	Medieval (1853)	629
Keswick	Upper Derwent		St Herbert, Braithwaite	1900	629
Keswick	Keswick w Borrowdale	Keswick	St John the Evangelist, Keswick	1838	3,596
Keswick	Keswick w Borrowdale	Borrowdale	St Andrew, Borrowdale	C16th (1825)	307
Keswick	Keswick w Borrowdale	Borrowdale	Holy Trinity, Grange	1861	307
Keswick	St John's-In-The-Vale, Threlkeld & Wythburn	St John's in the Vale & Wythburn	St John, St John's in the Vale	C16th (1845)	155
Keswick	St John's-In-The-Vale, Threlkeld & Wythburn	St John's in the Vale & Wythburn	Wythburn Church	C16th (1640)	155
Keswick	St John's-In-The-Vale, Threlkeld & Wythburn	Threlkeld	St Mary, Threlkeld	Medieval (1777)	568
	8 benefices	14 parishes	35 churches		27,777

==== Closed churches in this area ====
Church	Founded	Closed
St Helen's, Cockermouth	medieval	medieval
St Leonard's, Cockermouth	medieval	medieval
St Bartholomew, Brackenthwaite	medieval	C16th
Wythop Old Chapel	C16th	C19th
St John the Evangelist, Uldale	1869	1963
Ireby Old Church	ancient	1971
Papcastle Mission Church	1875	2002

=== Deanery of Solway ===
Miss. com.	Benefice	Parish	Churches	Founded	Population
Criffel View	Allonby, Cross Canonby & Dearham	Allonby	Christ Church, Allonby	1744	426
Criffel View	Allonby, Cross Canonby & Dearham	Crosscanonby	St John the Evangelist, Crosscanonby	Medieval	1,020
Criffel View	Allonby, Cross Canonby & Dearham	Dearham	St Mungo, Dearham	Medieval	2,648
Criffel View	Maryport, Netherton, Flimby & Broughton Moor	St Mary w Christ; Church Maryport	St Mary, Maryport	1760	2,787
Criffel View	Maryport, Netherton, Flimby & Broughton Moor	Flimby	St Nicholas, Flimby	Medieval	1,845
Criffel View	Maryport, Netherton, Flimby & Broughton Moor	Netherton & Broughton Moor	All Souls, Netherton	1886	7,047
Workington	Westfield		St Mary, Workington	1887	6,638
Workington	Workington	Workington St John	St John the Evangelist, Workington	1823	8,050
Workington	Workington	Workington St Michael	St Michael, Workington	Ancient	3,885
Workington	Camerton & Seaton w West Seaton		St Peter, Camerton	Medieval (rebuilt 1694, 1796)	6,244
Workington	Camerton & Seaton w West Seaton		St Paul, Seaton	1882	6,244
Workington	Harrington & Distington	Harrington	St Mary, Harrington	Medieval	5,963
Workington	Harrington & Distington	Distington	Holy Spirit, Distington	Medieval (1884)	2,198
Solway Plain	Aspatria w Hayton & Gilcrux	Aspatria	St Kentigern, Aspatria	Ancient (rebuilt 1848)	2,852
Solway Plain	Aspatria w Hayton & Gilcrux	Gilcrux	St Mary, Gilcrux	Medieval	310
Solway Plain	Aspatria w Hayton & Gilcrux	Hayton	St James, Hayton	1867	821
Solway Plain	Solway Plain		St Mungo, Bromfield	Ancient	6,426
Solway Plain	Solway Plain		St Mary, Abbeytown	Medieval	6,426
Solway Plain	Solway Plain		St Cuthbert, Holme St Cuthbert	1845	6,426
Solway Plain	Solway Plain		Christ Church, Silloth	1870	6,426
Solway Plain	Solway Plain		St Matthew, Westnewton	1857	6,426
Solway Plain	Solway Plain		St John the Evangelist, Newton Arlosh	Medieval	6,426
Solway Plain	Solway Plain		St Bride, Kirkbride	Medieval	6,426
Solway Plain	Thursby		St Andrew, Thursby	Ancient	1,360
Solway Plain	Wigton		St Mary, Wigton	Medieval	6,491
	10 benefices	18 parishes	25 churches		67,011

Mission comm	Benefice	Parish	Churches	Founded	Population
Carlisle Rural	The Barony of Burgh	Aikton	St Andrew, Aikton	Medieval	428
Carlisle Rural	The Barony of Burgh	Kirkandrews-on-Eden w Beaumont	St Mary, Beaumont	Medieval	424
Carlisle Rural	The Barony of Burgh	Burgh-by-Sands	St Michael, Burgh by Sands	Medieval	1,253
Carlisle Rural	The Barony of Burgh	Great Orton	St Giles, Great Orton	Medieval	461
Carlisle Rural	The Barony of Burgh	Kirkbampton	St Peter, Kirkbampton	Medieval	494
Carlisle Rural	The Barony of Burgh	Bowness	St Michael, Bowness-on-Solway	Medieval	1,044
Carlisle Rural	Caldbeck, Castle Sowerby & Sebergham	Caldbeck	St Kentigern, Caldbeck	Ancient	763
Carlisle Rural	Caldbeck, Castle Sowerby & Sebergham	Castle Sowerby w Sebergham	St Mary, Sebergham	Medieval	359
Carlisle Rural	Caldbeck, Castle Sowerby & Sebergham	Castle Sowerby w Sebergham	St Kentigern, Castle Sowerby	Medieval	359
Carlisle Rural	Westward, Rosley-with-Woodside & Welton	Westward	St Hilda, Westward	1560	326
Carlisle Rural	Westward, Rosley-with-Woodside & Welton	Rosley & Welton	St James, Welton	1874	707
Carlisle Rural	Westward, Rosley-with-Woodside & Welton	Rosley & Welton	Holy Trinity, Rosley	1840	707

==== Closed churches in this deanery ====
Church	Founded	Closed
St Lawrence, Great Broughton	C17th	C17th
St Andrew's, Kirkandrews-on-Eden	medieval	1692
St Kentigern's, Grinsdale	medieval	2001
Old St Hilda's, Westward	medieval	medieval
Christ Church, Maryport	1872	2013
Holy Trinity, West Seaton	1893	2015
St Paul, Causewayhead	1845	2016
St Columba, Broughton Moor	1905	2019
Christ Church, Waverton	1865	2023

== Archdeaconry of Westmorland and Furness ==
=== Deanery and Mission Community of Barrow ===
- Benefice and Parish of Barrow-in-Furness St John the Evangelist (population 2,209): St John the Evangelist's Church (1878, rebuilt 1934)
- Benefice and Parish of Barrow-in-Furness St Mark (population 3,178): St Mark's Church (1878)
- Benefice and Parish of Barrow-in-Furness St Paul (population 9,023): St Paul's Church, Newbarns, Barrow (1871)
- Benefice of North Barrow
  - Parish of Barrow-in-Furness St Francis with St Matthew (population 7,560): St Francis' Church, Ormsgill, Barrow (c. 1937, rebuilt 1955) --- St Matthew's Church (1878, rebuilt 1967, closed 2015)
  - Parish of Barrow-in-Furness St James (population 2,908): St James's Church (1869)
- Benefice of South Barrow
  - Parish of Barrow-in-Furness St Aidan (population 3,955): St Aidan's Church (1952, rebuilt 1967)
  - Parish of Barrow-in-Furness St George with St Luke (population 14,824): St George's Church (1860) --- St Luke's Church, Risedale, Barrow (1878, rebuilt 1964, closed 2012) --- St Perran's Church, Roose, Barrow (1874, rebuilt 1894, 1967, closed 2014)
- Benefice and Parish of Walney Island (population 10,533): St Mary the Virgin's Church (medieval, rebuilt 1577, 1853, replaced on different site 1908) → chapel of Ease at Biggar
- St Andrew's (CoE to St Luke's)

=== Deanery and Mission Community of Furness ===
Benefice	Parish	Church	Founded	Population
Low Furness	Aldingham, Dendron & Rampside	St Cuthbert, Aldingham	Medieval	1,753
Low Furness	Urswick	St Mary the Virgin & St Michael, Urswick	Medieval	1,057
Low Furness	Bardsea	Holy Trinity, Bardsea	1843	635
Low Furness	Pennington	St Michael & the Holy Angels, Pennington	Medieval (rebuilt 1827)	2,113
Lindal with Marton		St Peter, Lindal and Marton	1875 (rebuilt 1886)	536
The Duddon Estuary	Broughton & Duddon	St Mary Magdalene, Broughton-in-Furness	Medieval chapel to Kirkby Ireleth	1,184
The Duddon Estuary	Broughton & Duddon	Holy Innocents, Broughton Mills	1888	1,184
The Duddon Estuary	Broughton & Duddon	Holy Trinity, Seathwaite	Medieval chapel to Kirkby Ireleth (rebuilt C16th, 1874)	1,184
The Duddon Estuary	Broughton & Duddon	St John the Evangelist, Woodland	Medieval chapel to Kirkby Ireleth (rebuilt 1698, 1822, 1865)	1,184
The Duddon Estuary	Broughton & Duddon	St John the Baptist, Ulpha	C16th	1,184
The Duddon Estuary	Kirkby Ireleth	St Cuthbert, Kirkby Ireleth	Medieval	1,191
The Duddon Estuary	Thwaites	St Anne, Thwaites	Medieval (rebuilt 1721, 1854)	429
Coniston & the Crake Valley	Coniston & Torver	St Andrew, Coniston	1586 or earlier (rebuilt 1819)	1,017
Coniston & the Crake Valley	Coniston & Torver	St Luke, Torver	Medieval chapel to Ulverston (rebuilt 1849, 1884)	1,017
Coniston & the Crake Valley	Colton	Holy Trinity, Colton	Medieval (Parish church 1676)	410
Coniston & the Crake Valley	Egton w Newland	St Mary the Virgin, Penny Bridge	C16th or earlier (rebuilt 1791, 1831)	794
Coniston & the Crake Valley	Lowick	St Luke, Lowick	Medieval (St Andrew); rebuilt 1817, rebuilt and rededicated 1885	387
Dalton-In-Furness & Ireleth-With-Askam		St Mary, Dalton-in-Furness	Medieval (rebuilt 1885)	11,998
Dalton-In-Furness & Ireleth-With-Askam		St Peter, Ireleth with Askam	1865	11,998
Millom		Holy Trinity, Millom	Medieval	6,943
Millom		St George, Millom	1874	6,943
Ulverston St Mary with Holy Trinity		St Mary, Ulverston	Medieval (rebuilt except tower 1866)	11,834
Ulverston St Mary with Holy Trinity		St John the Evangelist, Osmotherley	1873	11,834
8 benefices	15 parishes	23 churches		42,281

==== Closed churches in this deanery ====
St Helen's Chapel, near Furness Abbey: medieval chapel to Dalton, closed C16th

Medieval chapels to Urswick at Bolton and Bardsea (St John's) both closed C16th

Church	Founded	Closed
St Helen's, Ireleth	medieval	medieval
Christ Church, Kirksanton	1891	1950
St Leonard's, Swarthmoor	1883	C20th
Holy Trinity, Ulverston	1832	1975
St Barnabas, Newton	1900	1977
St Margaret, Dalton-in-Furness	1904	1981
St John the Baptist, Blawith	C16th or earlier (rebuilt 1863)	1988
St Jude's, Sandside	1874	2006
Good Shepherd, Grizebeck	1898	2012
St Michael, Rampside	Medieval chapel to Dalton (rebuilt 1621, 1840, Parish church 1887)	2016
St Matthew, Dendron	1642 (rebuilt 1776, 1795, Parish church 1892)	2024
St Luke, Haverigg (Millom parish)	1890	2025

=== Deanery of Kendal ===
MC	Benefice	Parish	Church	Founded	Population
Kendal Estuary	Arnside		St James, Arnside	1866	3,151
Kendal Estuary	Beetham		St Michael & All Angels, Beetham	Medieval	857
Kendal Estuary	Burton and Holme	Burton	St James, Burton-in-Kendal	Medieval	1,485
Kendal Estuary	Burton and Holme	Holme	Holy Trinity, Holme	1839	1,464
Kendal Estuary	Heversham & Milnthorpe	Heversham	St Peter, Heversham	Medieval	955
Kendal Estuary	Heversham & Milnthorpe	Milnthorpe	St Thomas, Milnthorpe	1837	2,130
Kendal Estuary	Levens		St John the Evangelist, Levens	1828	1,238
Beacon		Burneside w Longsleddale	St Oswald, Burneside	1602	2,547
Beacon		Burneside w Longsleddale	St Mary, Longsleddale	1712	2,547
Beacon		Grayrigg	St John the Evangelist, Grayrigg	pre-C18th	459
Beacon		Kendal St George	St George, Kendal	1754 (rebuilt 1838)	5,494
Beacon		Selside	St Thomas, Selside	1709	269
Beacon		Skelsmergh	St John the Baptist, Skelsmergh	1871	612
Two Valleys	Cartmel Fell		St Anthony, Cartmel Fell	1504	322
Two Valleys	Crosthwaite Kendal		St Mary, Crosthwaite	Medieval (rebuilt C19th)	647
Two Valleys	Witherslack		St Paul, Witherslack	1669	735
Two Valleys	Winster		Holy Trinity, Winster	C16th (rebuilt 1875)	70
Two Valleys	Underbarrow w Helsington		All Saints, Underbarrow	Medieval (rebuilt 1869)	817
Two Valleys	Underbarrow w Helsington		St John the Evangelist, Helsington	1726	817
Two Valleys	Crook		St Catherine, Crook	1620	257
Two Valleys	Kendal St Thomas		St Thomas, Kendal	1835	4,172
Kendal Helm	Old Hutton & New Hutton	New Hutton	St Stephen, New Hutton	1739	319
Kendal Helm	Old Hutton & New Hutton	Old Hutton	St John the Baptist, Old Hutton	1873	401
Kendal Helm	Natland		St Mark, Natland	Medieval (rebuilt 1735, 1825, 1910)	2,370
Kendal Helm	Crosscrake		St Thomas, Crosscrake	Medieval (rebuilt 1773, 1875)	1,169
Kendal Helm	Kendal Holy Trinity		Holy Trinity, Kendal	Medieval	17,287
Western Dales		Dent w Cowgill	St John the Evangelist, Cowgill	1838	655
Western Dales		Dent w Cowgill	St Andrew, Dent	Medieval	655
Western Dales		Sedbergh & Lune	St Mark, Cautley	1847	3,294
Western Dales		Sedbergh & Lune	St John the Baptist, Garsdale	1861	3,294
Western Dales		Sedbergh & Lune	St Andrew, Sedbergh	Medieval	3,294
Western Dales		Sedbergh & Lune	St John the Evangelist, Firbank	1842	3,294
Western Dales		Sedbergh & Lune	Holy Trinity, Howgill	c. 1685 (rebuilt 1838)	3,294
Western Dales		Sedbergh & Lune	All Saints, Killington	Medieval	3,294
Kirkby Lonsdale			St Mary the Virgin, Kirkby Lonsdale	Medieval	4,385
Kirkby Lonsdale			St Bartholomew, Barbon	Medieval (rebuilt 1815, 1893)	4,385
Kirkby Lonsdale			Holy Trinity, Casterton	1833	4,385
Kirkby Lonsdale			St John the Divine, Hutton Roof	Medieval (rebuilt 1757, 1881)	4,385
Kirkby Lonsdale			All Saints, Lupton	1867	4,385
Kirkby Lonsdale			St Peter, Mansergh	1726 (rebuilt 1880)	4,385
Kirkby Lonsdale			St Patrick, Preston Patrick	c. 1500 (rebuilt 1852)	4,385
	19 benefices	27 parishes	41 churches		57,561

==== Closed churches in this deanery ====
Church	Founded	Closed
St Columba's, Casterton	medieval	C17th
St Mary's Chapel, Witherslack	medieval	ruinous C17th
St Gregory, Vale of Lune	1860s	1984
Hincaster Mission Room		
All Hallows, Kendal	1864	2002
Storth Village Church	1897	2020s
Holy Ghost, Middleton	1634 (1879)	2020s

=== Deanery of Windermere ===
==== Mission Community of Cartmel Peninsula ====
- Benefice of Allithwaite and Flookburgh
  - Parish of Allithwaite (population 2,488): St Mary's Church, Templand (1864)
  - Parish of Flookburgh (population 1,781): St John the Baptist's Church (1777)
- Benefice and Parish of Cartmel (population 623): St Michael's Church (medieval, refounded as SS Mary & Michael's Priory Church 1188)
- Benefice of Grange-Over-Sands and Field Broughton with Lindale
  - Parish of Field Broughton with Lindale (population 405)
  - * St Peter's Church, Field Broughton (1745, rebuilt 1894)
  - Parish of Grange-over-Sands (population 3,754)
    - St Paul's Church (1852)
    - Grange Fell Church (1906)
- Benefice of Leven Valley
  - Parish of Finsthwaite (population 184): St Peter's Church (1724)
  - Parish of Haverthwaite (population 776): St Anne's Church (1824)
  - Parish of Staveley-in-Cartmel (population 285): St Mary's Church (1537)

Miss comm	Benefice	Parish	Churches	Founded	Population
Central Lakes	Grasmere and Rydal		St Oswald, Grasmere	Medieval	847
Central Lakes	Grasmere and Rydal		St Mary, Rydal	1823	847
Central Lakes	Hawkshead & Low Wray w Sawrey & Rusland & Satterthwaite	Hawkshead w Low Wray	St Michael & All Angels, Hawkshead	Medieval chapel to Dalton (Parish church 1578)	680
Central Lakes	Hawkshead & Low Wray w Sawrey & Rusland & Satterthwaite	Sawrey	St Peter, Far Sawrey	1869	196
Central Lakes	Hawkshead & Low Wray w Sawrey & Rusland & Satterthwaite	Rusland	St Paul, Rusland	1745	59
Central Lakes	Hawkshead & Low Wray w Sawrey & Rusland & Satterthwaite	Satterthwaite	All Saints, Satterthwaite	Medieval, C16th	159
Central Lakes	Loughrigg Team	Ambleside	St Mary, Ambleside	1850	2,611
Central Lakes	Loughrigg Team	Brathay	Holy Trinity, Brathay	1836	96
Central Lakes	Loughrigg Team	Langdale	Holy Trinity, Langdale	Medieval	498
Central Lakes	Loughrigg Team	Langdale	Little Langdale Mission Chapel	C19th	498
South Lakes		Ings	St Anne, Ings	C16th	186
South Lakes		Kentmere	St Cuthbert, Kentmere	Medieval (rebuilt 1866)	78
South Lakes		Staveley	St James, Staveley-in-Kendal	1865	1,572
South Lakes		Windermere St Martin	St Martin, Bowness	Medieval (rebuilt 1483)	3,291
South Lakes		Windermere St Mary	St Mary, Windermere	1847	4,360
South Lakes		Troutbeck	Jesus Church, Troutbeck	Medieval (1562)	364
	6 benefices	23 parishes	25 churches		25,293

==== Closed churches in this deanery ====
Medieval chapel at Graythwaite, disused C16th.

Church	Founded	Closed
St Catherine's, Applethwaite	Medieval	C18th
St Margaret's, Staveley-in-Kendal	Medieval	C18th
St Anne's, Ambleside	Medieval	1984
St John's, Windermere	1886	1995
St Margaret, Low Wray	1845	2007
St Paul, Lindale	1627	2019
Graythwaite Mission Room (Hawkshead)		

== Progression of church numbers ==
Period	Additions	Closures	Number at end
Medieval	[c. 211 medieval churches and chapelries]		211
C14th	[c. 211 medieval churches and chapelries]	Carlisle Trinity?, Easton?	209
C15th	[c. 211 medieval churches and chapelries]	Addingham Old?, Linstock?, Little Asby?, Watermillock Old, Westward Old?	204
C16th	Addingham New, Blawith, Borrowdale, Buttermere, Colton, Coniston, Ings, Lowick, Mardale, Matterdale, Newlands, St John's in the Vale, Satterthwaite, Seathwaite, Staveley-in-Cartmel, Thrimby, Ulpha, Walney, Wasdale Head, Watermillock New, Westward New, Winster, Wythburn, Wythop	Brackenthwaite, Carlisle St Alban, Cockermouth St Helen?, Cockermouth St Leonard?, Ireleth St Helen?	223
C17th	Burneside, Crook, Dendron, Grayrigg?, Great Broughton, Howgill, Lindale, Middleton, Nicholforest, Rampside, Soulby, Stainmore, Swindale?, Witherslack New, Woodland	Casterton, Great Broughton, Kirkandrews-on-Eden, Witherslack	234
1700s	Selside		235
1710s	Longsleddale, Whitehaven Trinity		237
1720s	Finsthwaite, Helsington, Mansergh		240
1730s	New Hutton		241
1740s	Allonby, Field Broughton, Rusland		243
1750s	Culgaith, Kendal St George, Penny Bridge?, Whitehaven St James	Applethwaite?, Staveley-in-Kendal?	245
1760s	Maryport		246
1770s	Flookburgh		247
1780s	Brampton New		248
1790s	Hensingham		249
1810s		Thrimby	248
1820s	Carlisle Christ Ch, Haverthwaite, Levens, Rydal, Underskiddaw, Workington St John		254
1830s	Brathay, Carlisle Trinity, Casterton New, Cowgill, Holme, Houghton, Kendal St Thomas, Keswick, Milnthorpe, Ulverston Trinity		264
1840s	Bardsea, Calder Bridge New, Causewayhead, Cautley, Firbank, Holme Eden, Holme St Cuthbert, Ireby New, Low Wray, Rosley, Talkin, Torver, Upperby, Whitehaven Christ Ch, Windermere		279
1850s	Ambleside St Mary, Clifton, Gilsland, Grange-over-Sands, Great Broughton, Murton-Hilton, Penrith Christ Ch, Scotby, Skirwith, Westnewton		289
1860s	Allithwaite, Arnside, Barrow St George, Barrow St James, Carlisle St James, Carlisle St John, Carlisle St Paul, Carlisle St Stephen, Cockermouth Christ Ch, Cotehill, Far Sawrey, Frizington, Gaitsgill, Gamblesby, Garsdale, Grange, Hayton, Ireleth-Askam, Ivegill, Kendal All SS, Lupton, Pooley Bridge, Stainmore St Mary, Staveley-in-Kendal New, Uldale, Vale of Lune, Waverton, Wythop New	Wythop	316
1870s	Barrow St John, Barrow St Luke, Barrow St Mark, Barrow St Matthew, Barrow St Paul, Barrow St Perran, Blackford, Carlisle St Mary, Cleator Moor, Cumdivock, Eamont Bridge, Great Strickland, Hethersgill, Keekle, Lindal-Marton, Little Langdale?, Maryport Christ Ch, Millom St George, Old Hutton, Osmotherley, Papcastle, Sandside, Silloth, Skelsmergh, Welton		341
1880s	Bigrigg, Broughton Mills, Colby?, Kirkland, Little Salkeld?, Martindale St Peter, Netherton, Seascale, Seaton, Swarthmoor, Tebay, Tindale?, Windermere St John, Workington St Mary		355
1890s	Carlisle St Aidan, Carlisle St Andrew, Carlisle St Barnabas, Eskdale St Bega, Grizebeck, Haverigg, Hincaster?, Kirksanton, Lees Hill?, Mosser St Philip, Newbiggin-on-Lune, Storth, Wath Brow, West Seaton		369
1900s	Braithwaite, Broughton Moor, Dalton St Margaret, Grange Fell, Graythwaite?, Hunsonby, Knock, Moresby Parks, Newton, Penruddock, Plumpton Wall, Ravenglass?		381
1910s	Calthwaite, Cumwhinton?		383
1920s	Cummersdale		384
1930s	Barrow St Francis, Carlisle St Herbert, Carlisle St Peter, Thornhill, Whitehaven St Peter	Carlisle Christ Ch, Eamont Bridge, Mardale, Swindale	385
1940s		Whitehaven Trinity	384
1950s	Barrow St Aidan, Carlisle St Elisabeth, Carlisle St Luke, Carlisle St Mark, Whitehaven St Andrew	Carlisle St Mary, Colby?, Kirkcambeck?, Kirksanton	385
1960s		Carlisle St Stephen, Graythwaite?, Knock?, Ravenglass?, Uldale	380
1970s	Carlisle Sandsfield?	Appleby St Michael, Brampton Old, Brougham St Ninian, Carlisle St Paul, Gaitsgill, Highhead, Hunsonby, Ireby, Little Salkeld, Newton, Stainmore St Mary, Swarthmoor?, Ulverston Trinity, Upper Denton, Whitehaven Christ Ch	366
1980s		Ambleside St Anne, Blawith, Dalton St Margaret, Hincaster?, Newbiggin-on-Lune, Vale of Lune	360
1990s		Windermere St John	359
2000s		Gamblesby, Grinsdale, Kendal All SS, Lees Hill?, Low Wray, Moresby Parks, Papcastle, Sandside, Soulby, Tindale?	349
2010s		Barrow St Luke, Barrow St Matthew, Barrow St Perran, Broughton Moor, Carlisle Sandsfield?, Causewayhead, Cumwhinton?, Grizebeck, Keekle, Lindale, Maryport Christ Ch, Rampside, Warwick-on-Eden, Wath Brow, West Seaton	334
2020s		Brougham St Wilfrid, Calder Bridge New, Carlisle Trinity, Cummersdale, Dendron, Haverigg, Lowther, Middleton, Storth, Waverton	324

== Dedications of medieval parish churches ==
Chapels are in italics.

- All Saints: Allhallows, Bolton (Cumberland), Bolton (Westmorland), Cockermouth, Culgaith, Kendal, Killington, Orton (Westmorland), Raughton Head, Renwick, Scaleby, Underbarrow, Watermillock
- Christ & St Mary: Armathwaite
- Holy Spirit: Distington
- Holy Trinity: Carlisle, Carlisle Cathedral, Kendal, Millom, Wetheral, Winster
- Jesus Church: Troutbeck
- St Alban: Carlisle
- St Andrew: Aikton, Crosby Garrett, Dacre, Dent, Greystoke, Kirkandrews-on-Eden, Kirkandrews-on-Esk, Penrith, Sedbergh, Thursby
- St Anne: Ambleside, Thwaites
- St Anthony: Cartmel Fell
- St Barnabas: Setmurthy
- St Bartholomew: Barbon, Loweswater
- St Bega: Bassenthwaite, St Bees
- St Bridget: Beckermet, Bridekirk, Brigham, Kirkbride, Moresby
- St Catherine: Applethwaite, Crook, Eskdale
- St Columba: Casterton, Warcop
- St Cuthbert: Aldingham, Bewcastle, Carlisle, Cliburn, Clifton (Westmorland), Dufton, Edenhall, Embleton, Great Salkeld, Kentmere, Kirkby Ireleth, Kirklinton, Lorton, Milburn, Nether Denton, Plumbland
- St Edmund: Newbiggin (Kirkby Thore)
- St Giles: Orton (Cumberland)
- St Helen: Cockermouth, Ireleth
- St Hilda: Westward
- St James: Burton-in-Kendal, Buttermere, Hutton-in-the-Forest, Ormside, Temple Sowerby, Uldale
- St John the Baptist: Bassenthwaite, Beckermet, Corney, Croglin, Melmerby, Newton Reigny, Old Hutton, Waberthwaite
- St John the Evangelist: Crosby-on-Eden, Crosscanonby, Grayrigg, Hutton Roof, Newton Arlosh, Woodland
- St Kentigern: Aspatria, Bromfield, Caldbeck, Castle Sowerby, Crosthwaite (Cumberland), Dearham, Grinsdale, Irthington, Kirkcambeck, Mungrisdale
- St Lawrence: Appleby, Crosby Ravensworth, Kirkland, Morland
- St Leonard: Cleator, Cockermouth, Little Asby, Warwick-on-Eden
- St Luke: Clifton (Cumberland), Lowick, Ousby
- St Margaret: Over Staveley
- SS Margaret & James: Long Marton
- St Mark: Natland
- St Martin: Bowness-on-Windermere, Brampton, Martindale
- St Mary: Beaumont, Carlisle, Crosthwaite (Westmorland), Cumrew, Cumwhitton, Dalton-in-Furness, Egremont, Ennerdale Bridge, Gilcrux, Gosforth, Harrington, Hesket-in-the-Forest, Holme Abbey, Kirkby Lonsdale, Little Strickland, Mallerstang, Rockcliffe, Sebergham, Stapleton, Thornthwaite, Threlkeld, Ulverston, Walton, Whicham, Whitbeck, Wigton, Wreay
- SS Mary & Michael: Cartmel, Urswick
- St Mary Magdalene: Brackenthwaite, Broughton-in-Furness, Hayton (Carlisle), Lanercost
- St Michael: Addingham, Ainstable, Appleby, Arlecdon, Arthuret, Barton, Beetham, Bootle, Bowness-on-Solway, Brough, Burgh-by-Sands, Dalston, Hawkshead, Isel, Kirkby Thore, Lamplugh, Lowther, Mosser, Muncaster, Nether Wasdale, Pennington, Shap, Skelton, Stanwix, Torpenhow, Workington
- St Nicholas: Flimby, Lazonby, Whitehaven
- St Ninian: Brougham
- St Oswald: Burneside, Dean, Grasmere, Kirkoswald, Ravenstonedale
- St Patrick: Bampton, Patterdale, Preston Patrick
- St Paul: Irton
- St Peter: Asby, Askham, Camerton, Castle Carrock, Drigg, Heversham, Kirkbampton, Langwathby, Linstock
- St Theobald: Great Musgrave
- St Thomas: Crosscrake
- St Thomas a Becket: Farlam
- St Wilfrid: Brougham
- No dedication/dedication unknown: Easton, Haile, Highhead, Ireby, Kirkby Stephen, Ponsonby, Upper Denton

== Dedications of post-medieval churches ==
- All Saints: Calthwaite (1913), Kendal (1866), Lupton (1868), Raughton Head (1678), Penruddock (1902), Satterthwaite (C16th), Storth (1897), Watermillock (1558)
- All Souls: Netherton (1886), Scotby (1854)
- Christ Church: Allonby (1744), Broughton (1856), Carlisle (1828), Cockermouth (1865), Ivegill (1868), Kirksanton (1891), Maryport (1872), Penrith (1850), Silloth (1870), Waverton (1865), Whitehaven (1847)
- Good Shepherd: Grizebeck (1898)
- Holy Innocents: Broughton Mills (1887)
- Holy Spirit: Middleton (C17th)
- Holy Trinity: Bardsea (1843), Brathay (1836), Carlisle (1830), Casterton (1831), Colton (C16th), Grange (1861), Great Langdale (C16th), Holme (1839), Howgill (c. 1685), Mardale (C16th), Rosley (1840), Seathwaite (C16th), Ulverston (1832), West Seaton (1893), Whitehaven (1714)
- St Aidan: Barrow (1952), Carlisle (1899), Newbiggin-on-Lune (1892)
- St Andrew: Borrowdale (C16th), Carlisle (1890), Coniston (1578), Mirehouse (1955)
- St Anne: Haverthwaite (1824), Ings (1635)
- St Barnabas: Carlisle (1899), Great Strickland (1872), Newton (1900)
- St Bega: Eskdale (1890)
- St Bridget: Calder Bridge (1842)
- St Columba: Broughton Moor (1905)
- St Cuthbert: Holme St Cuthbert (1845), Seascale (1881)
- St Elisabeth: Harraby (1954)
- St Francis: Barrow (1937)
- St George: Barrow (1861), Kendal (1755), Millom (1877)
- St Gregory: Vale of Lune (1860s)
- St Herbert: Braithwaite (1900), Carlisle (1932)
- St James: Arnside (1864), Barrow (1869), Carlisle (1867), Cummersdale (1927), Hayton (Aspatria) (1868), Ireby (1845), Over Staveley (1865), Tebay (1880), Welton (1874), Whitehaven (1752)
- St John the Baptist: Blackford (1871), Blawith (1577), Flookburgh (C16th), Garsdale (C16th), Murton-cum-Hilton (1856), St John's in the Vale (C16th), Skelsmergh (C16th), Ulpha (C16th), Upperby (1840)
- St John the Evangelist: Barrow (1878), Bigrigg (1877), Carlisle (1867), Cleator Moor (1872), Cotehill (1868), Cowgill (1837), Cumdivock (1870), Cumwhinton (C19th/20th), Eamont Bridge (1871), Firbank (1841), Gamblesby (1868), Helsington (1726), Hensingham (1791), Houghton (1839), Keswick (1838), Levens (1827), Osmotherley (1874), Plumpton Wall (1907), Skirwith (1856), Uldale (1869), Windermere (1886), Workington (1823)
- St Jude: Gaitsgill (1869), Sandside (1874)
- St Lawrence: Great Broughton (C17th)
- St Leonard: Swarthmoor (1883)
- St Luke: Barrow (1878), Carlisle (1958), Haverigg (1891), Soulby (C17th), Torver (C16th)
- St Margaret: Dalton-in-Furness (1904), Low Wray (1845), Wythop (1865)
- St Mark: Barrow (1878), Belah (1951), Cautley (1847)
- St Martin: Brampton (1788)
- St Mary: Allithwaite (1865), Ambleside (1854), Carlisle (1870), Hethersgill (1876), Longsleddale (C16th), Maryport (1760), Penny Bridge (C18th), Rydal (1823), Stainmore (1861), Staveley-in-Furness (C17th), Walney (1568), Windermere (1847), Workington (1889)
- SS Mary & Gabriel: Market Brough (C16th)
- St Mary Magdalene: Gilsland (1852)
- St Matthew: Barrow (1878), Dendron (1644), Westnewton (1857)
- St Michael: Addingham (C16th), Rampside (1621)
- St Nicholas: Nicholforest (C17th)
- St Olaf: Wasdale Head (C16th)
- St Paul: Barrow (1871), Carlisle (1869), Causewayhead (1845), Frizington (1867), Grange-over-Sands (1852), Lindale (1627), Pooley Bridge (1867), Rutland (1745), Seaton (1881), Warwick Bridge (1845), Witherslack (C16th)
- St Perran: Barrow (1874)
- St Peter: Broughton (1731), Far Sawrey (1866), Finsthwaite (1724), Ireleth (1637), Kells (1908), Kingmoor (1930), Lindal (1875), Mansergh (1726), Martindale (1880)
- St Philip: Eaglesfield (1891)
- St Stephen: Carlisle (1865), New Hutton (1739), Stainmore (1608)
- St Thomas: Kendal (1837), Milnthorpe (1837), Selside (C17th)
- No dedication/dedication unknown: Bleatarn (1865), Colby (C19th), Grange Fell (1898), Graythwaite (?), Hincaster (?), Hunsonby (1905), Keekle (1875), Kirkland (1886), Knock (1905), Lees Hill (?), Little Langdale (C19th), Little Salkeld (C19th), Matterdale (C16th), Moresby Parks (1902), Newlands (1571), Papcastle (1875), Ravenglass (?), Swindale (C17th), Talkin (1842), Thornhill (1932), Thrimby (C16th), Tindale (?), Underskiddaw (1829), Wath Brow (1881), Wythburn (C16th), Wythop (C16th)

== Benefices by population ==
Benefice	Population	Churches	Clergy (Nov 2025)
Carlisle St Herbert // Carlisle Harraby // Carlisle Upperby	24,600	3	1 Joint Rector/Vicar
Carlisle Holy Trinity St Barnabas // Carlisle Morton	23,945	2	Vacant, 0.33 Curate
Barrow-in-Furness South	18,779	2	Vacant, 0.5 Curate
Penrith with Newton Reigny	17,353	3	1 Team Rector, 2 Curates
Kendal Holy Trinity	17,287	1	1 Vicar, 2.5 Curates, 2.5 NSMs
Barrow-in-Furness St John // Walney Island	12,742	2	1 Joint Priest-in-Charge
Dalton-in-Furness and Ireleth-with-Askam	11,998	2	1 Priest-in-Charge
Workington	11,935	2	Vacant, 1 NSM
Ulverston	11,834	2	1 Rector
Cockermouth Area	11,696	4	1 Team Rector, 3 Curates, 2 NSMs
Maryport, Netherton, Flimby & Broughton Moor	11,679	3	Vacant, 0.5 NSM
Egremont and Haile // St Bees	11,415	5	1 Joint Priest-in-Charge, 1 Team Vicar, 2 NSMs, 1 Hon. Curate
Barrow-in-Furness North	10,558	2	Vacant
Crosslacon	10,171	4	1 Team Rector
South Lakes	9,851	6	1 Team Rector, 1 Team Vicar
Beacon	9,381	6	1 Priest-in-Charge
Carlisle Stanwix	9,095	2	1 Priest-in-Charge, 0.33 Curate, 1 NSM
Eden, Gelt and Irthing	9,043	10	1 Team Rector, 1 NSM
Barrow-in-Furness St Paul	9,023	1	1 Priest-in-Charge, 1.5 Curates, 1 NSM
Whitehaven	8,669	2	1 Team Rector, 0.5 Curate
Harrington and Distington	8,161	2	1 Rector, 1 Curate
Criffel View (Allonby etc // Aspatria etc)	8,077	6	1 Joint Priest-in-Charge, 1 Curate, 0.5 Hon. Curate
Wigton // Thursby	7,851	2	1 Joint Priest-in-Charge
Heart of Eden	7,588	13	1 Priest-in-Charge, 2 NSMs
Carlisle St John the Evangelist (under Bishop of Ebbsfleet)	7,413	2	1 Vicar
Millom	6,943	2	Vacant (since 2018)
Whitehaven Hensingham (under Bishop of Ebbsfleet)	6,655	1	1 Vicar
Workington Westfield	6,638	1	1 Priest-in-Charge
Solway Plain	6,426	7	Vacant, 1.5 NSMs, 0.5 Hon. Curate
Camerton, Seaton and West Seaton	6,244	2	1 Vicar
Carlisle Denton Holme	5,990	1	1 Vicar, 0.33 Curate
Esk // Rockcliffe & Blackford	5,636	5	Vacant
Low Furness	5,558	4	Vacant, 1 Curate
Cross Fell // Kirkoswald, Renwick etc	5,520	12	Vacant, 1 Interim Priest-in-Charge (Kirkoswald etc)
Carlisle Houghton (under Bishop of Ebbsfleet)	5,075	2	1 Vicar
Whitehaven Kells	5,058	1	1 Vicar, 0.5 Curate, 1 NSM
Keswick w Borrowdale // St John's, Threlkeld & Wythburn	4,626	6	1 Joint Vicar/Priest-in-Charge
Brigham, Clifton, Dean & Mosser	4,575	5	Vacant (since 2019)
North Westmorland	4,561	8	1 Priest-in-Charge, 1.33 Curates, 1 NSM
Crook // Kendal St Thomas	4,429	2	1 Joint Priest-in-Charge
Carlisle St Aidan // Carlisle St Cuthbert	4,402	2	1 Joint Priest-in-Charge
Kirkby Lonsdale	4,385	7	1 Team Rector, 1 Team Vicar, 1 Curate
Heversham and Milnthorpe // Levens	4,323	3	1 Joint Priest-in-Charge
Upper Eden	4,283	5	1 Priest-in-Charge, 0.33 Curate, 0.5 NSM
Allithwaite and Flookburgh	4,269	2	1 Vicar
Old and New Hutton // Natland // Crosscrake	4,259	4	Vacant, 0.5 Curate, 1.5 NSMs, 1 Hon. Curate
Grange-Over-Sands and Field Broughton with Lindale	4,159	3	1 Vicar, 1 NSM
Barony of Burgh	4,104	6	Vacant, 2 NSMs
Holme Eden and Wetheral with Warwick	4,058	2	1 Rector
Arnside // Beetham	4,008	2	1 Joint Priest-in-Charge, 1 Joint Curate
Seatallan	3,996	7	1 Rector, 1 Curate
Western Dales	3,949	8	1 Vicar
Whitehaven Mirehouse	3,946	1	Vacant
Binsey	3,904	12	1 Team Rector, 1 Team Vicar, 1 Curate
Dalston w Cumdivock, Ivegill, Raughton Head & Wreay	3,869	5	Vacant
Inglewood	3,616	7	1 Priest-in-Charge
High Westmorland	3,557	5	Vacant, 0.33 Curate, 0.5 NSM
Moresby (under Bishop of Ebbsfleet)	3,446	1	1 Priest-in-Charge
Loughrigg	3,205	4	1 Team Rector, 1 Team Vicar, 1 NSM
Barrow-in-Furness St Mark	3,178	1	Vacant (since 2017)
Western Lake District	3,155	10	1 Rector, 1 Curate
Burton and Holme (under Bishop of Ebbsfleet)	2,949	2	1 Vicar
Scotby and Cotehill with Cumwhinton	2,817	2	1 Vicar
The Duddon Estuary	2,804	7	1 Vicar
Coniston and the Crake Valley	2,608	5	1 Rector
Cartmel Fell // Crosthwaite // Underb // Winster // Withers	2,591	6	Vacant, 1 NSM, 1 Hon. Curate
Keswick Crosthwaite // Upper Derwent	2,406	5	1 Joint Priest-in-Charge
Caldbeck, Castle Sow, Seb // Westward, Rosley, Welton	2,155	6	Vacant
Dacre, Matterdale and Watermillock	1,838	3	1 Vicar, 1 Curate, 1 NSM
Lanercost, Walton, Gilsland and Nether Denton	1,676	4	1 Rector
Bewcastle, Stapleton and Kirklinton with Hethersgill	1,509	4	1 Priest-in-Charge
Greystoke with Penruddock and Mungrisdale	1,503	3	1 Rector
Leven Valley	1,245	3	1 Vicar
Hawkshead etc	1,094	4	1 Vicar, 1 Curate
Lamplugh with Ennerdale	965	3	Vacant (since 2013)
Grasmere and Rydal	847	2	1 Rector
Barton, Pooley Bridge and Martindale	790	4	1 Vicar
Cartmel	623	1	1 Vicar
Lorton and Loweswater with Buttermere	570	3	Vacant (since 2020), 1 Curate, 1 Hon. Curate
Lindal with Marton	536	1	Vacant
Patterdale	502	1	1 Priest-in-Charge
[Carlisle Cathedral	0	1	1 Dean, 2 Canons Residentiary]

There are a total of 81 benefices (counting multiple benefices held simultaneously by the same cleric as one).

== Deaneries by population ==
Deanery	Population	Churches	Clergy (Nov 2025)	Popn. per stip. cl.
Carlisle	84,389	19	1 Rector, 3 Vicars, 2 Priests-in-Charge, 1 Curate, 1 NSM	12,056
Solway	73,270	37	1 Rector, 1 Vicar, 3 Priests-in-Charge, 2 Curates, 5 NSMs, 1 Hon. Curate	10,467
Kendal	57,561	41	1 Rector, 4 Vicars, 4 Priests-in-Charge, 5 Curates, 4 NSMs, 2 Hon. Curates	4,112
Calder	57,476	35	4 Rectors, 3 Vicars, 2 Priests-in-Charge, 3 Curates, 3 NSMs, 1 Hon. Curate	4,790
Barrow	54,280	8	2 Priests-in-Charge, 2 Curates, 1 Deanery Curate, 1 NSM	10,856
Furness	42,281	23	2 Rectors, 1 Vicar, 1 Priest-in-Charge, 1 Curate	8,456
Penrith	31,122	33	2 Rectors, 2 Vicars, 3 Priests-in-Charge, 3 Curates, 1 NSM	3,112
Derwent	27,777	35	2 Rectors, 2 Vicars, 1 Priest-in-Charge, 5 Curates, 2 NSMs, 1 Hon. Curate	2,778
Windermere	25,293	25	3 Rectors, 7 Vicars, 1 Curate, 2 NSMs	2,299
Brampton	24,739	27	3 Rectors, 1 Vicar, 1 Priest-in-Charge, 1 NSM	4,948
Appleby	19,989	31	3 Priests-in-Charge, 2 Curates, 4 NSMs	3,998
Totals	498,177	314	91 stipendiary clergy, 29 non-stipendiary	average: 5,474

== Archdeaconries by population ==
Archdeaconry	Population	Churches	Clergy (Nov 2025)	Popn. per stip. cl.
Westmorland and Furness	179,415	97	35 stipendiary, 9 non-stipendiary	5,126
Carlisle	160,239	110	27 stipendiary, 7 non-stipendiary	5,935
West Cumberland	158,523	107	29 stipendiary, 13 non-stipendiary	5,466
