= List of churches in Copeland =

The following is a list of churches in the former Borough of Copeland in Cumbria. This area is now part of the Cumberland unitary authority area.

The parishes of Parton, Lowca and Lowside Quarter do not appear to have any active churches.

The former borough has an estimated 71 churches for 70,603 inhabitants, a ratio of one church to every 994 people.

== Map of medieval parish churches ==
For the purposes of this map medieval is taken to be pre-1485. It is of note that Cumbria, unlike most parts of England, saw a sustained programme of church building during the 16th and 17th centuries as the more remote parts of the district were settled.

Medieval parish churches in Copeland

== List ==
Name	Civil parish (settlement)	Dedication	Web	Founded	Denomination	Benefice	Notes
St Michael, Arlecdon	Arlecdon & Frizington (Arlecdon)	Michael		Medieval	Church of England	Crosslacon Team	Rebuilt 1829. Threatened with closure 2014-2016
St Paul, Frizington	Arlecdon & Frizington (Frizington)	Paul		1868	Church of England	Crosslacon Team	
St Joseph, Frizington	Arlecdon & Frizington (Frizington)	Joseph		1872	Roman Catholic	Cleator & Frizington	Current building 1896–1897. Single parish with Cleator 2000
St John's Methodist Church, Frizington	Arlecdon & Frizington (Frizington)	John ?			Methodist Church	Whitehaven MC	
St John, Beckermet	Beckermet	John ?		Medieval	Church of England	Beckermet & Ponsonby	Rebuilt 1878–1879
Thornhill Mission Church	Beckermet (Thornhill)				Church of England	Beckermet & Ponsonby	
St Michael & All Angels, Bootle	Bootle	Michael & Angels		Medieval	Church of England	Black Combe Churches	
St John the Evangelist, Cleator Moor	Cleator Moor	John the Evangelist		1870-1872	Church of England	Crosslacon Team	Church closed 2017, services continuing in the church hall
Wath Brow Mission Church	Cleator Moor			1890	Church of England	Crosslacon Team	Originally a Methodist chapel on other site, pulled down & relocated
St Mary, Cleator	Cleator Moor	Mary		1869-1872	Roman Catholic	Cleator & Frizington	First Catholic church in town, dedicated to St Bega, opened 1853
Cleator Moor Methodist Church	Cleator Moor				Methodist Church	Whitehaven MC	
St Leonard, Cleator	Cleator Moor (Cleator)	Leonard of Noblac		12th century	Church of England	Crosslacon Team	
Holy Spirit, Distington	Distington	Holy Spirit		1884-1886	Church of England	Distington	
St Peter, Drigg	Drigg and Carleton	Peter		1850	Church of England	Seascale and Drigg	
SS Mary & Michael, Egremont	Egremont	Mary & Michael		1220	Church of England	Egremont & Haile Team	Rebuilt 1880
St Mary, Egremont	Egremont	Mary			Roman Catholic	Egremont & Seascale	Own parish 1878
Egremont Methodist Church	Egremont				Methodist Church	Whitehaven MC	Current building 1876
St John the Evangelist, Bigrigg	Egremont (Bigrigg)	John the Evangelist		1880	Church of England	Egremont & Haile Team	
Emmanuel Church, Moor Row	Egremont (Moor Row)	Jesus			Unknown		
St Mary, Ennerdale	Ennerdale & Kinniside (E'dale Bridge)	Mary		Medieval	Church of England	Lamplugh with Ennerdale	Rebuilt 1858 as church (previously chapel)
St Catherine, Eskdale	Eskdale	Catherine of Alexandria		Medieval	Church of England	Eskdale Benefice	Rebuilt 1881
St Bega, Eskdale	Eskdale (Eskdale Green)	Bega		1997	Church of England	Eskdale Benefice	Built as a school and adopted as a church
St Mary, Gosforth	Gosforth	Mary		8th century	Church of England	Gosforth	
Gosforth Methodist Church	Gosforth				Methodist Church	Whitehaven MC	
Haile Parish Church	Haile	None		Medieval	Church of England	Egremont & Haile Team	
St Paul, Irton	Irton with Santon	Paul		Medieval	Church of England	Eskdale Benefice	Rebuilt 1856
St Michael, Lamplugh	Lamplugh	Michael		Medieval	Church of England	Lamplugh with Ennerdale	Rebuilt 1870
Kirkland Mission Church	Lamplugh (Kirkland)			1886	Church of England	Lamplugh with Ennerdale	Occasional Methodist services since closure of Kirkland Meth Ch 1995
Holy Trinity, Millom	Millom	Trinity		12th century	Church of England	Millom Benefice	
St George, Millom	Millom	George		1874-1877	Church of England	Millom Benefice	
Our Lady & St James, Millom	Millom	Mary & James		1868	Roman Catholic	Millom & Coniston	Rebuilt 1888
Millom Baptist Church	Millom			1867	Baptist Union		Rebuilt 1884
Millom Methodist Church	Millom			1872	Methodist Church	SW Lakes Meth/URC Area	
Millom Community Church	Millom			2011	Assemblies of God		
St Luke, Haverigg	Millom (Haverigg)	Luke		1890	Church of England	Millom Benefice	
St Anne, Thwaites	Millom Without (Thwaites)	Anne		Medieval	Church of England	Millom Benefice	Rebuilt as parish church 1854
St Bridget, Moresby	Moresby	Brigid of Kildare		Medieval	Church of England	Moresby	Rebuilt 1823
St Mark's Village Church, Moresby Parks	Moresby (Moresby Parks)	Mark			CoE / Methodist		
St Michael & All Angels, Muncaster	Muncaster	Michael & Angels		12th century	Church of England	Eskdale Benefice	
Ponsonby Parish Church	Ponsonby	Dedication lost		Medieval	Church of England	Beckermet & Ponsonby	
St Bridget's, Calder Bridge	Ponsonby (Calder Bridge)	Brigid of Kildare		1842	Church of England	Beckermet & Ponsonby	
Old St Bridget's, Calder Bridge	Ponsonby (Calder Bridge)	Brigid of Kildare		Medieval	Church of England	Beckermet & Ponsonby	
St Cuthbert, Seascale	Seascale	Cuthbert		1881	Church of England	Seascale and Drigg	Current building 1890
St Joseph, Seascale	Seascale	Joseph		1960	Roman Catholic	Egremont & Seascale	Private premises used from 1953
Seascale Methodist Church	Seascale				Methodist Church	Whitehaven MC	
Priory Church of SS Mary & Bega, St Bees	St Bees	Mary & Bega		12th century	Church of England	St Bees	
St Bees Methodist Church	St Bees				Methodist Church	Whitehaven MC	
St John the Baptist, Ulpha	Ulpha	John the Baptist		16th century	Church of England	Broughton & Duddon	Benefice also includes several churches in South Lakeland
St John, Waberthwaite	Waberthwaite	John ?		12th century	Church of England	Eskdale Benefice	
St John the Baptist, Corney	Waberthwaite (Corney)	John the Baptist		Medieval	Church of England	Black Combe Churches	
St Michael & All Angels, Nether Wasdale	Wasdale (Nether Wasdale)	Michael & Angels		15th century	Church of England	Gosforth	
St Olaf, Wasdale Head	Wasdale (Wasdale Head)	Olaf II of Norway		Medieval	Church of England	Gosforth	Only dedicated to St Olaf in 1977
Keekle Mission Room	Weddicar (Keekle)				Church of England	Hensingham	
St Mary, Whicham	Whicham	Mary		12th century	Church of England	Black Combe Churches	
St Mary, Whitbeck	Whicham (Whitbeck)	Mary		13th century	Church of England	Black Combe Churches	
St Nicholas Tower Chapel, Whitehaven	Whitehaven	Nicholas		1693	Church of England	Whitehaven Parish	Most of church burnt down 1971; tower still used for services
St James, Whitehaven	Whitehaven	James		1753	Church of England	Whitehaven Parish	
St Begh's Priory, Whitehaven	Whitehaven	Bega		1761	Roman Catholic	Whitehaven (Catholic)	Current church 1864–1868
Whitehaven URC	Whitehaven			1695	United Reformed		
Whitehaven Salvation Army	Whitehaven				Salvation Army		
New Life Church, Whitehaven	Whitehaven			1920	FIEC		Affinity. Assemblies of God church until 2016
Grace Church Whitehaven	Whitehaven			2014	Newfrontiers		
Sandhills Lane Church, Whitehaven	Whitehaven				Brethren		
St John, Hensingham	Whitehaven (Hensingham)	John ?		1911-1913	Church of England	Hensingham	Replaced earlier chapel nearby of 1790
Hensingham Methodist Church	Whitehaven (Hensingham)				Methodist Church	Whitehaven MC	
St Peter, Kells	Whitehaven (Kells)	Peter		1938	Church of England	Kells	
St Mary, Kells	Whitehaven (Kells)	Mary		1927	Roman Catholic	Kells & Mirehouse	Own parish 1943. Rebuilt 1961
St Andrew, Mirehouse	Whitehaven (Mirehouse)	Andrew		1955	Church of England	Mirehouse	
St Benedict, Mirehouse	Whitehaven (Mirehouse)	Benedict of Nursia		c. 1961	Roman Catholic	Kells & Mirehouse	Own parish 1961
Woodbank Community Church	Whitehaven (Woodhouse)				Elim		
