= Listed buildings in Beckermet =

Beckermet is a civil parish in the Cumberland district, Cumbria, England. It contains 21 buildings that are recorded in the National Heritage List for England. Of these, two are listed at Grade I, the highest of the three grades, three are at Grade II*, the middle grade, and the others are at Grade II, the lowest grade. The parish contains the villages of Beckermet and Calder Bridge and the surrounding countryside. The most important building in the parish is the former Calder Abbey; the ruins of this and associated structures are listed. The other listed buildings include houses and associated structures, churches and a medieval font in a churchyard, a farmhouse and its gate piers and wall, two war memorials, and a telephone kiosk.

== Key ==
Grade	Criteria
I	Buildings of exceptional interest, sometimes considered to be internationally important
II*	Particularly important buildings of more than special interest
II	Buildings of national importance and special interest

== Buildings ==
Name and location	Photograph	Date	Notes	Grade
Ruins of the monastic church and east range, Calder Abbey; 54.44402°N 3.46474°W		Mid 12th century	The remains of the church consist of a nave, a transept, a tower at the crossing, and a chancel. The west doorway is in Norman style, and the rest of the church is Early English. The eastern range comprises parts of the chapter house, the dormitory, and an undercroft. The ruins are also a scheduled monument.	I
House incorporating monastic ruins 54.44370°N 3.46486°W		Mid 12th century	The house dates from the 1780s, incorporating material from the monastery. the porch being added in 1859. The house is in stone, partly stuccoed, with a string course, an eaves cornice, and a hipped slate roof. The west front has two storeys with a cellar, and seven bays. It has a central Doric porch with a pediment, and above it is a Venetian window. The front facing the river has three storeys, ten bays, and a bay window. The windows are mullioned, and some also have transoms. To the east are single-storey courtyard buildings.	I
St Bridget's Church, Beckermet; 54.44045°N 3.52032°W		Medieval	Alterations were made to the church in the 17th century. It is in roughcast stone and has a slate roof with coped gables. It is a small church consisting of a nave and a chancel, with a bellcote on the west gable. In the nave are three-light mullioned windows. The west doorway has a plain surround.	II*
Font; 54.44645°N 3.51482°W	—	Medieval (probable)	The font is in the churchyard of St John's Church, and was placed in its present position in the 1930s. It is in ashlar stone, and is octagonal on an octagonal base, and has a shallow bowl with a drain.	II
Gatehouse, Calder Abbey; 54.44404°N 3.46706°W	—	14th century (probable)	The gatehouse has been altered and later used for other purposes. It is in stone with quoins and a slate roof with coped gables. There two storeys and two bays. Each gable end contains a pointed double-chamfered wagon arch. The east arch has chamfered imposts and plinths; the west arch is blocked.	II*
Sella Park; 54.43529°N 3.49093°W	—	14th century	A pele tower was incorporated into this later 17th-century country house, which was restored in the 19th century. It is in stone, mainly roughcast and has quoins and a slate roof with coped gables. There are three storeys, a double-pile plan, and a front of seven bays. The windows are mullioned or mullioned and transomed.	II
Cauder House; 54.44017°N 3.47931°W	—	1727	A roughcast stone house with a slate roof. It has two storeys, three bays, and sash windows. The central doorway has a chamfered surround, a lintel with the date and an escutcheon, and a hood mould, above which is a medieval quatrefoil, probably from Calder Abbey.	II
Yeorton Farmhouse; 54.45600°N 3.50281°W	—	Mid 18th century	The farmhouse, later divided into two houses, is in stuccoed stone with quoins, a cornice, and a slate roof with coped gables. It has two storeys, the southwest front has seven bays, and the northeast face has five. In the centre of the southwest front is a round-headed entrance with an archivolt and a triple keystone. The doorway has a Doric surround with fluted pilasters, a Doric frieze, and a broken pediment surmounted by an urn. There is a plain entrance in the first bay, and a 20th-century conservatory on the front. The windows are of mixed types.	II
Gate piers and wall, Yeorton Farm; 54.45590°N 3.50286°W	—	Mid 18th century	The wall and gate piers are in ashlar stone. The wall is rusticated and about 30 metres (98 ft) long. The piers are also rusticated, and each has a Greek key band, an entablature with a pulvinated frieze and a dentilled cornice, and is surmounted by a ball finial.	II
Wodow Bank; 54.45819°N 3.53047°W	—	1816	A house in stuccoed stone with a slate roof, hipped at the west end. There are two storeys and four bays, and a two-bay extension. On the front is a portico with diagonal piers and clustered shafts. The windows are sashes. At the rear are two Venetian windows and a datestone.	II
North Lodge and gate piers, Pelham House; 54.43956°N 3.48223°W	—	Early 19th century	The lodge is in ashlar with a hipped slate roof. It is in a single storey, and has a cruciform plan. On the west front is a recessed porch with Doric columns, and a fanlight above the door. On the north front are pilaster strips, a sash window, and a casement window, and on the east and south sides are 20th-century extensions. There are four rusticated gate piers; the outer piers have urn finials, and the inner piers have plinths with coats of arms.	II
St Bridget's Church, Calder Bridge; 54.44068°N 3.47902°W		1842	The church, by Edmund Sharpe, is in sandstone and has a slate roof with coped gables and a tiled ridge. It has a cruciform plan and consists of a nave, transepts, a chancel with a north vestry, and a west tower. The tower has diagonal buttresses, a west lean-to porch, a south pointed entrance, and a coped corbelled parapet with pinnacles. The windows are lancets.	II
St John's Church; 54.44632°N 3.51452°W		1878–79	A stone church that has a slate roof with coped gables and tile cresting. It consists of a nave, a west narthex, a north aisle, transepts, a chancel with a north vestry and a south organ loft, and a northwest tower. The tower is octagonal and has gabled buttresses, louvred bell openings, and a slated pyramidal spire. The north entrance has a Tudor arched doorway, and in the south transept is a re-used 13th-century doorway. Inside the church is polychromic stone and brickwork.	II
Ingleberg House; 54.44571°N 3.51579°W	—	1900	The house is in red sandstone with quoins, moulded bands, and a slate roof with finials. There are two storeys, attics and a partial basement, and three bays, the left bay projecting and gabled. Steps flanked by low coped walls lead up to a central doorway with a decorated segmental arch, a fanlight, and a hood mould, above which is a dentilled cornice and a balustraded balcony. This is flanked by canted bay windows, each with a dentilled cornice and a parapet. The windows in the upper floor have quoined surrounds, architraves, and decorated lintels. In the apex of the gable is an initialled crest, and in the attic is a pedimented dormer.	II
Beckermet War Memorial; 54.45789°N 3.51861°W	—	1920	The war memorial stands at the edge of Beckermet Cemetery, near a road junction. It is in pink-grey granite, and consists of a polished wheel-head cross with splayed arms, on a tapering shaft, on a rough-hewn square plinth with a polished face, on another rough-hewn square block. On the front of the cross and the plinth are inscriptions and the names of those lost in the First World War, and on the back is an inscription and the names of those lost in the Second World War.	II
Calderbridge War Memorial; 54.44063°N 3.47914°W		1920	The war memorial is in the churchyard of St Bridget's Church, Calder Bridge. It is in red sandstone, and consists of a wheel-head Celtic cross on a tapering four-sided plinth on a two-stepped square base. On the front of the cross-head and shaft is strapwork and ballwork carving in relief. The base of the shaft and the plinth contain carved inscriptions and the names of those lost in the two World Wars.	II
Telephone kiosk 54.47732°N 3.52382°W	—	1935	A K6 type telephone kiosk, designed by Giles Gilbert Scott. Constructed in cast iron with a square plan and a dome, it has three unperforated crowns in the top panels.	II
Fishing box 54.44428°N 3.46146°W	—	Uncertain	The structure is on the bank of the River Calder in the grounds of Calder Abbey, and is constructed in stones taken from the abbey. It consists of a stone seat about 0.35 metres (1 ft 2 in) high. The south and west faces are built in re-used chamfered jamb stones, the east face and the top are in slabs, and the north face is open.	II
The Monks' Oven; 54.44441°N 3.46356°W		Uncertain	The detached oven is in the grounds of Calder Abbey. It is constructed in stone; some of the external stone has been removed, exposing a mound of earth. There is a low semicircular doorway, and the interior is composed of stones making a domed structure.	II*
