= Listed buildings in Ponsonby, Cumbria =

Ponsonby is a civil parish in the Cumberland district, Cumbria, England. It contains five listed buildings that are recorded in the National Heritage List for England. Of these, one is listed at Grade II*, the middle of the three grades, and the others are at Grade II, the lowest grade. The parish is almost completely rural, and the listed buildings comprise a church, a country house and its lodge, and two farmhouses.

== Key ==
Grade	Criteria
II*	Particularly important buildings of more than special interest
II	Buildings of national importance and special interest

== Buildings ==
Name and location	Photograph	Date	Notes	Grade
Ponsonby Church; 54.43679°N 3.47846°W		Medieval	The steeple was added in 1840, and the church was much altered by a restoration in 1874. It is in sandstone and has a slate roof with coped gables and crosses. The church consists of a nave and a chancel in a single vessel, a north vestry, and a west steeple. The steeple has a tower, a south stair turret with a hipped roof, and a broach spire with lucarnes. The windows are lancets. The oldest surviving fabric is in the chancel arch.	II
Pelham House; 54.43800°N 3.48513°W	—	1780	A country house that has been altered and extended. It is mainly in ashlar, with sill bands, a top frieze, and a cornice. The house mainly has two storeys, with an east front of five bays, the centre three bays having three storeys and projecting forward under a pediment. In the centre is portico with four fluted Doric columns without bases, a triglyph frieze, and a doorway with an architrave. The windows are sashes, those in the ground floor having architraves, friezes, and consoled cornices. There is also a three-bay extension, and a three-bay service wing.	II*
South Lodge, Pelham House; 54.43743°N 3.47532°W	—	Early 19th century	The lodge is in ashlar with a cornice and a blocking course, and it has a hipped slate roof. There is a single storey and three bays. On the south front is a recessed porch with two unfluted Doric columns and a pediment containing a coat of arms. Most of the windows are sashes and there is one casement window.	II
Church House Farmhouse; 54.43414°N 3.47962°W	—	Early 19th century	The farmhouse is in roughcast stone and has a slate roof with coped gables. There are two storeys, three bays, a single-bay extension to the right, and at the rear is an outshut and a wing. The doorway has a plain surround and a pediment, and the windows are sashes, also with plain surrounds.	II
Calder Farmhouse; 54.41733°N 3.48236°W	—	1829	A stone farmhouse with pilaster strips, a top frieze, and coped gables. There are two storeys, three bays, and a lean-to outshut at the southeast. Above the door is a fanlight, and the windows are sashes in stone surrounds. On the front is an inscribed and dated plaque.	II
