= St Bridget's Church, Calder Bridge =

Coordinates: 54.4407°N 3.4790°W

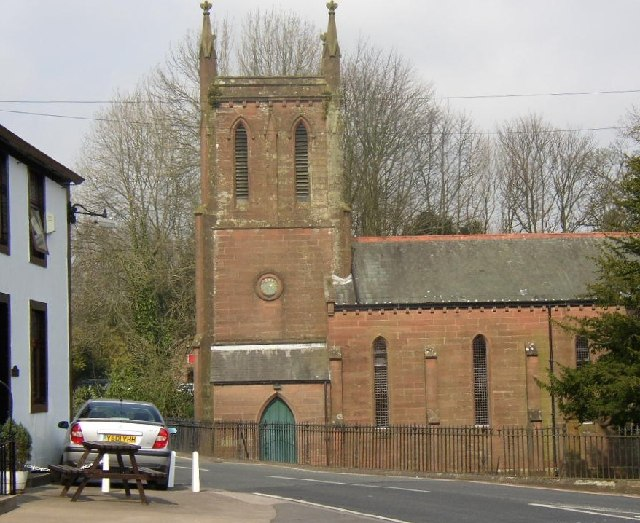
- St Bridget's Church, Calder Bridge, from the south

- Location within Cumbria
- OS grid reference: NY 041,060
- Location: Calder Bridge, near Beckermet, Cumbria
- Country: England
- Denomination: Anglican
- Website: St Bridget, Beckermet

History
- Status: Parish church
- Founder: Thomas Irwin
- Dedication: St Bridget
- Consecrated: 24 June 1844

Architecture
- Functional status: Active
- Heritage designation: Grade II
- Designated: 14 July 1989
- Architect: Edmund Sharpe
- Architectural type: Church
- Style: Gothic Revival
- Completed: 1842
- Construction cost: Under £1,900

Administration
- Province: York
- Diocese: Carlisle
- Archdeaconry: West Cumberland
- Deanery: Calder
- Parish: St Bridget, Beckermet and Ponsonby

Clergy
- Rector: Revd Jonathan M. S. Falkner

St Bridget's Church is on the north side of the A595 road in the village of Calder Bridge, near Beckermet, Cumbria, England. It is an active Anglican parish church in the deanery of Calder, the archdeaconry of West Cumberland, and the diocese of Carlisle. The church is recorded in the National Heritage List for England as a designated Grade II listed building.

== History ==
William Sowerby was ordained in 1826 becoming curate to St. Bridgets until about 1837, when he responded to an appeal by Bishop Broughton and travelled to Australia becoming the first Anglican clergyman at Goulburn. The current St Bridget's church was built between 1840 and 1842 to a design by the Lancaster architect Edmund Sharpe. It was paid for by Thomas Irwin of Calder Abbey. The church was opened for worship in May 1842, and consecrated on 24 June 1844 by Rt Revd John Bird Sumner, Bishop of Chester. Its cost was under £1,900 (equivalent to £190,000 in 2025).

== Architecture ==
The church is constructed in local red sandstone ashlar with a slate roof. Its plan is cruciform, with a west tower, a three-bay nave, long transepts, and a short chancel, with a north vestry, and a south organ loft. The windows are lancets and around the church are buttresses. In the tower are louvred bell-openings, a corbelled parapet and pinnacles. There are clock faces on three sides of the top stage of the tower. The Pre-Raphaelite stained glass, made by Powell's and dated 1879, was designed by H. E. Wooldridge and H. J. Burrow. The memorials in the north transept include one to Thomas Irwin and his wife.

== See also ==
- Listed buildings in St. Bridget Beckermet
- List of architectural works by Edmund Sharpe
