= St John, Beckermet =

Coordinates: 54.4463°N 3.5144°W

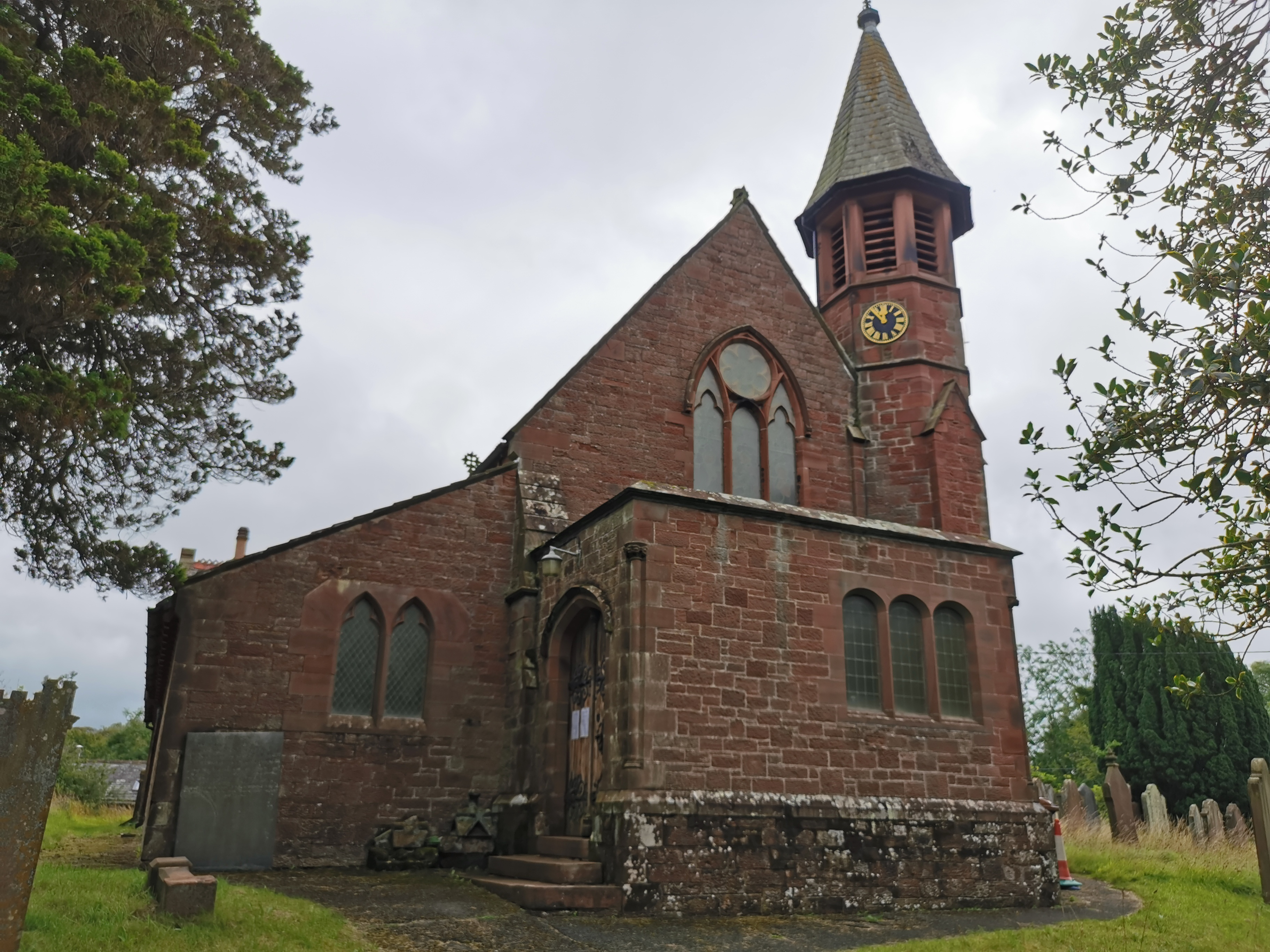
- St John, Beckermet

- Location in Cumbria
- OS grid reference: NY0189206717
- Location: St John, Beckermet, Cumbria
- Country: England
- Denomination: Anglican

History
- Status: Parish church
- Dedication: St John the Baptist

Administration
- Province: York
- Diocese: Carlisle
- Archdeaconry: West Cumberland
- Deanery: Calder
- Parish: The Black Combe Churches

St John, Beckermet, is in Beckermet, Cumbria, England. It is an Anglican parish church in the deanery of Calder, and the diocese of Carlisle. Its benefice is Seatallan. This is a Grade II Listed Building.

== History ==
St John, Beckermet was built in 1879 designed by F. Birtley of Kendal. 13th century elements are included in the present church including a doorway into south transept with a crocheted gable and carved monks heads.

== Architecture ==
Built of the local red sandstone with a slate roof. The church has an octagonal belfry. The interior space comprises a Nave. The east and west windows are stained, the west window erected by William Henry Watson. The church has a has pine pews and a square, grey font, and a 39 pipe organ. The brickwork is polychrome with black tuck pointing.

The churchyard closed for burial in 1996 and has no war graves.

== See also ==
- Listed buildings in St. John Beckermet
