= Kirkland, Lamplugh =

Village in Cumbria, England

Coordinates: 54.549°N 3.436°W

Kirkland
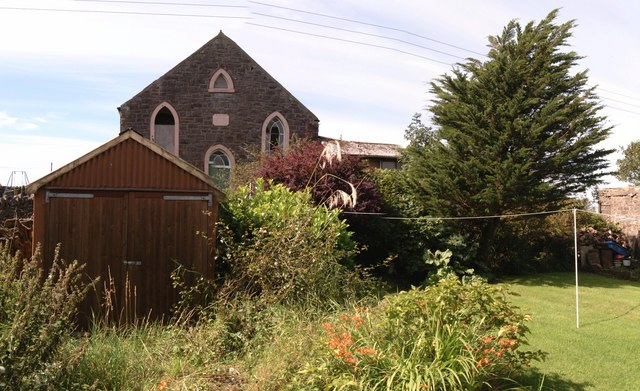
- Kirkland Bible Christian Chapel

- Location in Copeland Borough Location within Cumbria
- OS grid reference: NY071180
- Civil parish: Lamplugh
- Unitary authority: Cumberland
- Ceremonial county: Cumbria
- Region: North West
- Country: England
- Sovereign state: United Kingdom
- Post town: FRIZINGTON
- Postcode district: CA26
- Dialling code: 01946
- Police: Cumbria
- Fire: Cumbria
- Ambulance: North West
- UK Parliament: Whitehaven and Workington

Kirkland is a small village of 70 properties near the A5086 road, in the Cumberland district, in the English county of Cumbria. It is in the Ward of Lamplugh (The Lamplugh Parish Council) The nearest town is Cleator Moor.

The Bible Christian chapel was built when Cornish tin-miners, as part of the Cornish diaspora, relocated to the iron ore workings in West Cumbria. It replicates the Bible Christian Church Chapels in Devon & Cornwall. The Bible Christians amalgamated into the Methodist Movement in the early 20th century. This chapel was 'revived' and used until the mid-1990s. (It has since been developed as a residential property.)

== Amenities ==
Kirkland has a place of worship Kirkland Mission Church.

Kirkland is on the Coast to Coast (Cumbria to Yorkshire) National Cycle Route 71.

Ennerdale Water (2.4 miles away) is visible from the village.
