= Kirkland Mission Church =

Coordinates: 54.549179°N 3.434893°W

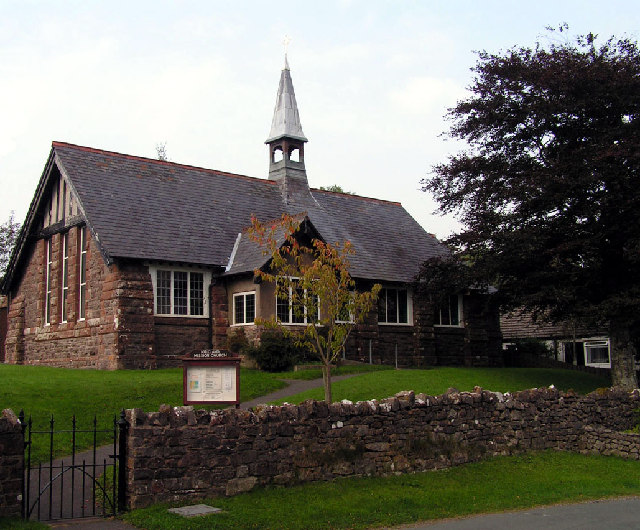
- Kirkland Mission Church

- Location in Cumbria
- ,
- OS grid reference: NY 0728418050
- Location: Kirkland, Cumbria
- Country: England
- Denomination: Anglican

History
- Status: Parish church
- Dedication: No dedication

Administration
- Province: York
- Diocese: Carlisle
- Archdeaconry: West Cumberland
- Deanery: Calder
- Parish: Kirkland

Clergy
- Vicar: Revd Ian Parker

Kirkland Mission Church is an Anglican church in Kirkland, in Cumbria in northern England. It falls within the deanery of Calder and the diocese of Carlisle. Its benefice is Lamplugh, Kirkland and Ennerdale. The church is not a listed building.
