= Calder Bridge =

Village in Cumbria, England

Coordinates: 54°26′25.5″N 3°28′45″W

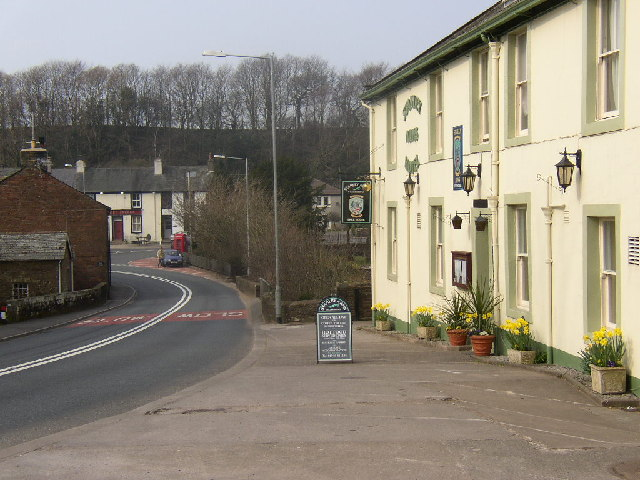
- Main road through Calder Bridge

- Location in Copeland Borough Location within Cumbria
- OS grid reference: NY0406
- Civil parish: Ponsonby
- Unitary authority: Cumberland
- Ceremonial county: Cumbria
- Region: North West
- Country: England
- Sovereign state: United Kingdom
- Post town: SEASCALE
- Postcode district: CA20
- Dialling code: 01946
- Police: Cumbria
- Fire: Cumbria
- Ambulance: North West
- UK Parliament: Whitehaven and Workington

Calder Bridge (also Calderbridge) is a small village in Cumbria in England. It is located between the hamlets of Gosforth and Beckermet and lies on the River Calder.

It is around 1 mile northeast from the Sellafield nuclear plant—Calder Hall Nuclear Power Station was the world's first major nuclear power station when it opened in 1956. The village contains the Grade II listed St Bridget's Church, the Grade II listed Pelham House (formerly Ponsonby Hall) and the Stanley Arms inn.

== Landmarks ==
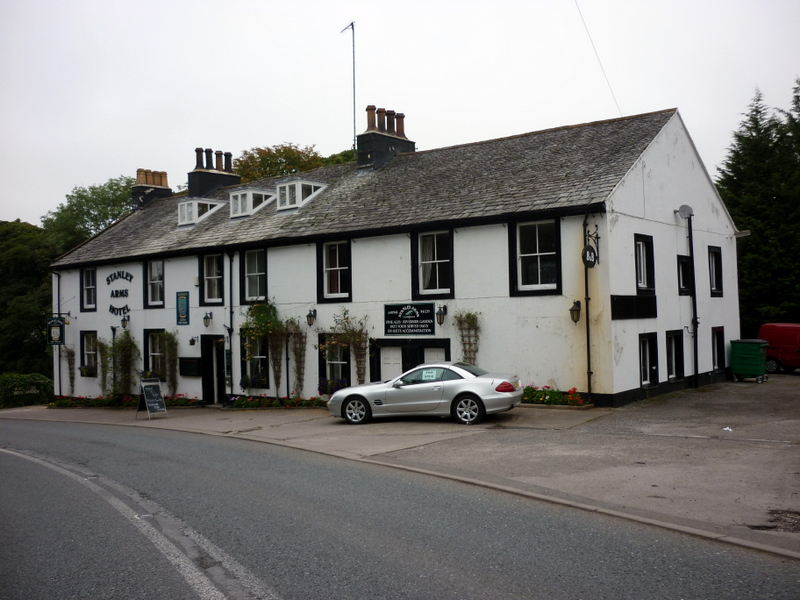
The Stanley Arms, Calder Bridge

The current St Bridget's Church, Calder Bridge was built in 1842. The church, listed as a Grade II listed building in 1989, is constructed in local red sandstone ashlar with a slate roof. The Pre-Raphaelite stained glass, made by Powell's date to 1879 and were designed by H. E. Wooldridge and H. J. Burrow.

Calder Abbey, which lies by the River Calder just northeast of Calder Bridge, was founded by Ranulph de Meschiens in 1134 for Cistercians who moved from Furness Abbey. It is a picturesque ruin adjoining Calder Abbey House, a largely 19th-century house which incorporates some remains of the abbey.

On the south side of Calder Bridge lies the Grade II listed Pelham House (named after Herbert Pelham, 3rd bishop of Barrow-in-Furness) but formerly known as Ponsonby Hall. It was built in 1774 and was designed by James Paine for Edward Stanley. This is currently used as offices for the Nuclear Decommissioning Authority (NDA), and before this was used as a School for Boys. There is woodland in the vicinity, known historically as the woods of Ponsonby.

The Stanley Arms is a 13-room inn in the village. The village was also home to the Golden Fleece inn.

== See also ==
- Listed buildings in St. Bridget Beckermet
