= Ponsonby, Cumbria =

Village and civil parish in Cumbria, England

Coordinates: 54.430°N 3.464°W

Ponsonby
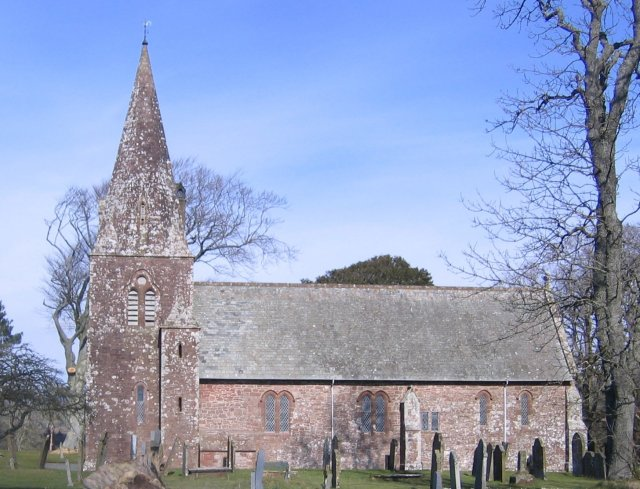
- Ponsonby Church

- Location in Copeland Borough Location within Cumbria
- Population: 205
- OS grid reference: NY050048
- Civil parish: Ponsonby
- Unitary authority: Cumberland
- Ceremonial county: Cumbria
- Region: North West
- Country: England
- Sovereign state: United Kingdom
- Post town: SEASCALE
- Postcode district: CA20
- Dialling code: 01946
- Police: Cumbria
- Fire: Cumbria
- Ambulance: North West
- UK Parliament: Whitehaven and Workington

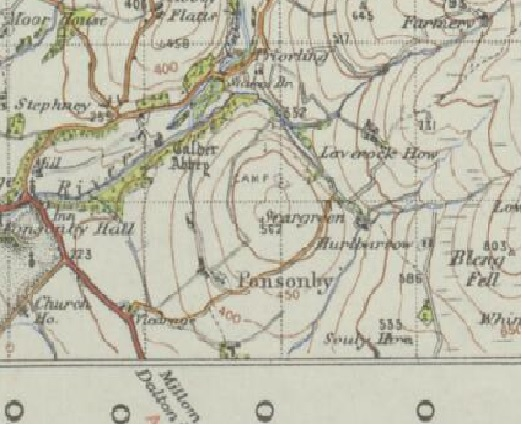
Historical Map of Ponsonby, Cumbria

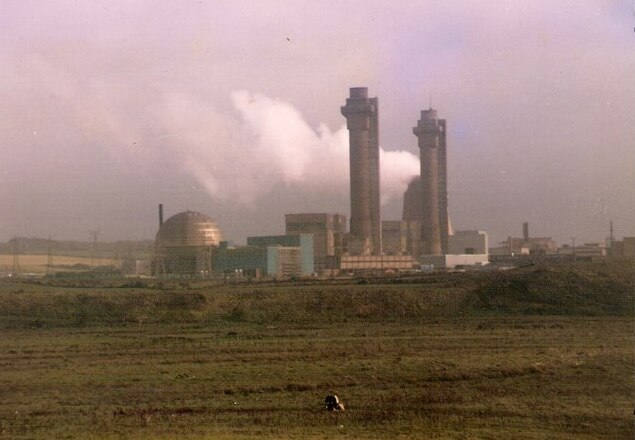

Ponsonby is a village and civil parish in the Cumberland district of the county of Cumbria, England. Ponsonby has a church which was constructed in 1840 and had further additions in 1874. Ponsonby is located along and just off the A595. It has a population of 205 according to the 2011 Census Data.

== Location ==
Ponsonby is located along the A595 and is on the edge of the Lake District National Park. Ponsonby is 2.5 miles away from the next large village of Gosforth and 10.9 miles away from Whitehaven which is Ponsonby's nearest town.

== History ==
In the 1870s Ponsonby was described as

"PONSONBY, a parish in Whitehaven district, Cumberland; on the river Calder, at Calder-Bridge. The manor was held, at the Norman Conquest, by the Ponsonbys, ancestors of the Earl of Bessborough, and, with P. Hall, belongs now to W. Stanley, Esq. The hall was built about 1786; containsmany old curiosities, brought from Dalegarth; and stands in a finely wooded park, with picturesque features, and commanding extensive views. A Roman camp is at P. Fell. The living is a p. curacy in the diocese of Carlisle. Value, £113.* Patron, W. Stanley, Esq. The church is ancient; and has some old stained glass, and a tower and spire; and contains monuments of the Stanleys."

Just outside the village of Ponsonby is Calder Bridge, within which lies the Grade II listed Pelham House (named after Herbert Pelham, 3rd bishop of Barrow-in-Furness) but formerly known as Ponsonby Hall. It was built in 1774 and was designed by James Paine for Edward Stanley. This is currently used as offices for the Nuclear Decommissioning Authority (NDA), and before this was used as a School for Boys.

== Ponsonby Church ==
The church is located between the Village of Ponsonby and Calder Bridge and is a Grade II listed building. The church has many links to the Stanley Family who were part of the village of Ponsonby and lived in the Calderbridge during the 14th Century and the church has a number of different memorials to the family. The church can be accessed by passing the dry moat, the moat is there due to the time the Church was built. From the Church you can see Sellafield (West) and the Lakeland Fells (North-East)

== Population ==
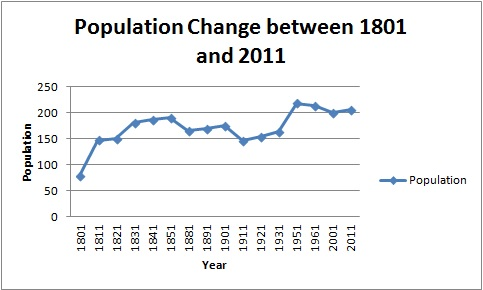
Population time Series for Ponsonby, Cumbria between 1801 and 2011

The village's population has increased since 1801 to a figure of 205 in 2011, in 106 households, all identifying as White. 165 people living in Ponsonby state that they are Christian, with 1 person Buddhist, and the remainder stating no religion or did not answer the section in the Census. The village is made up of 106 households, 7 do not have central heating.

== Employment ==
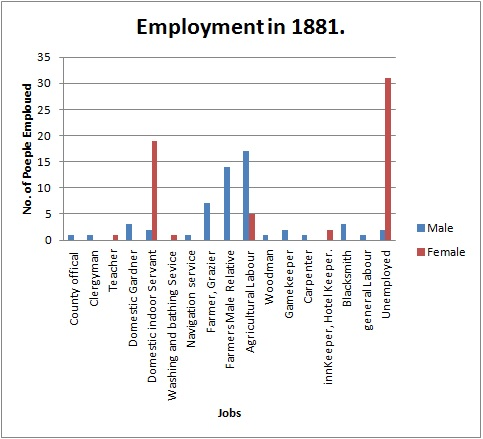
Employment in 1881

The Employment graph of 1881 shows there are many more men employed in the village than women. Women were often 'Home Workers' meaning that they would do domestic duties around the home. The sector that employed the most women is the Domestic Indoor Servant, essentially meaning that they were doing domestic duties in wealthy households within the community. The male population of Ponsonby were largely employed in the agricultural sector, either being a farmer, a farmer's son or male relative or an agricultural worker. The graph shows that there are very few people employed in high paying jobs, this could be due to the lack of education within the area.

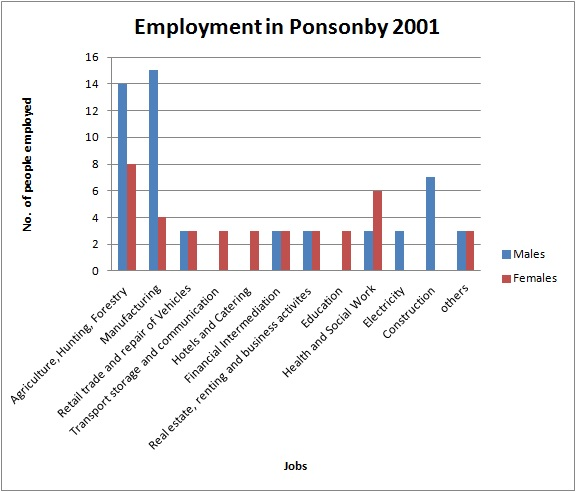
Employment in 2001

The employment graph of 2001 shows there has been an increase in the number of women employed in Ponsonby and an increase in the different sectors that people are employed in. There are a lot more people employed in 'office' jobs now compared to 1881, however agriculture is still the biggest employer. There is an increase in women working in Agriculture and Manufacturing, but males still dominate this area of work. From the graph it is apparent that there is more people travelling away from the village to work in cities where the 'office' jobs are located. There has also been an increase in the variety of Jobs that people from Ponsonby are working in, during 1881 many of the jobs were practical jobs and manual jobs, however there has now been a switch and the majority of people are working in 'office' jobs or terrestrial jobs.

== See also ==
- Listed buildings in Ponsonby, Cumbria
