= Calder Abbey =

Ruined monastery in Cumbria, England

Coordinates: 54°26′39″N 3°27′58″W

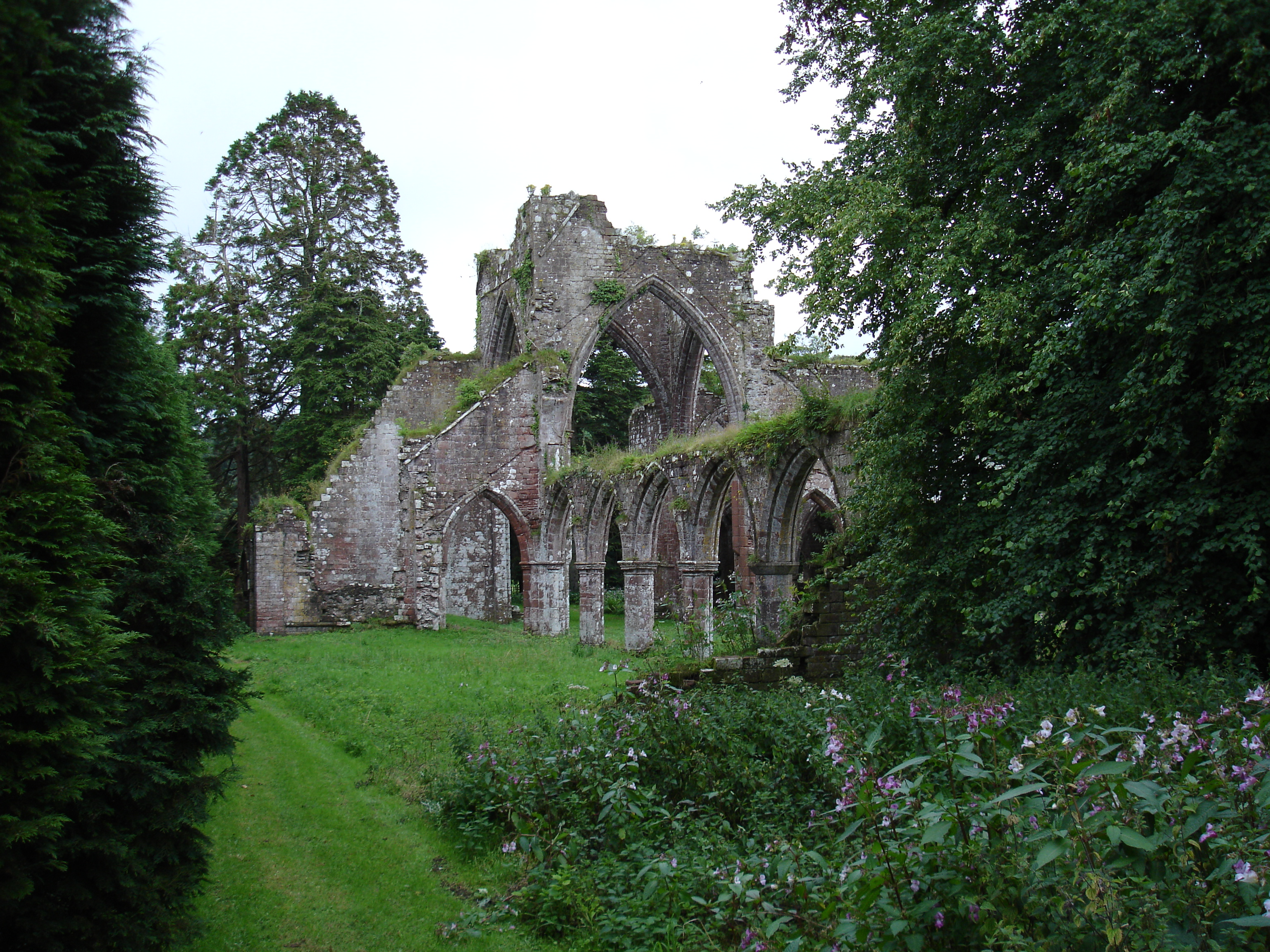
- Calder Abbey today
- Interactive map of Calder Abbey

Monastery information
- Full name: Calder Abbey
- Order: Savigniac, then Cistercian
- Established: 1135
- Disestablished: 1536
- Mother house: Furness Abbey
- Diocese: York

People
- Founder: Ranulf de Gernon

Site
- Location: Calderbridge, Cumbria, England
- Visible remains: North nave arcade, base of crossing tower, transepts, presbytery, east cloister range, refectory undercroft, monks' bridge.
- Public access: No - you can arrange a visit contact via phone or Facebook to schedule to visit (paid for)

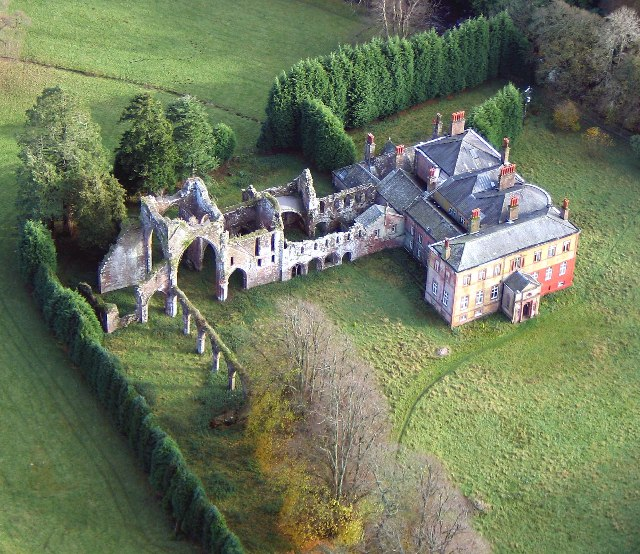
Calder Abbey from the air, with north at left

Calder Abbey in Cumbria was a Savigniac monastery founded in 1134 by Ranulph de Gernon, 2nd Earl of Chester, and moved to this site following a refoundation in 1142. It became Cistercian in 1148. It is near the village of Calderbridge.

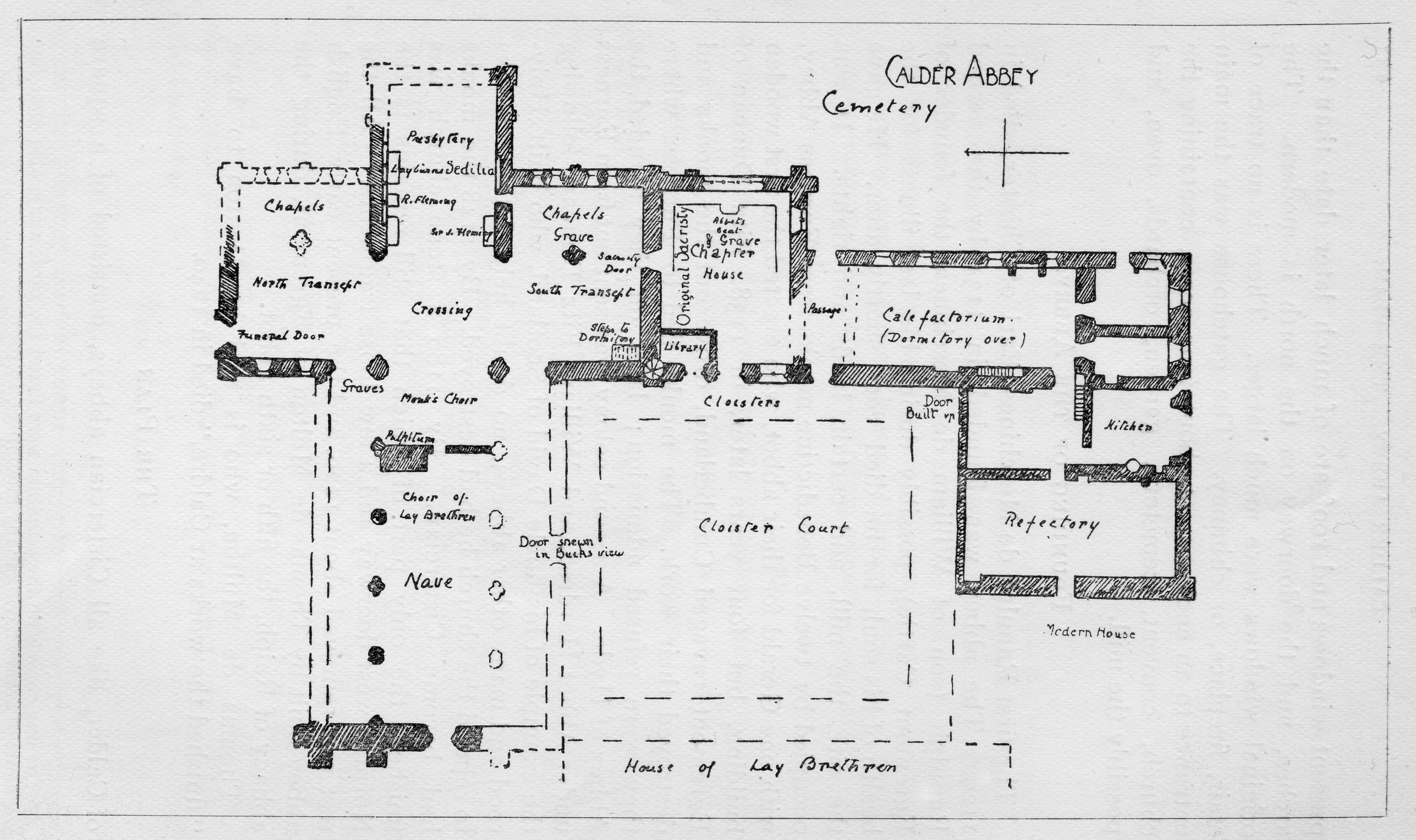
Sketch plan of Calder Abbey.

== History ==
Ranulf de Gernon (also known as Ranulph le Meschines) founded the abbey on 10 January 1134, and gave a site and a mill to the monks. It was a wooden building and occupied by twelve Savigniac monks from Furness Abbey under the abbot Gerold.

Only four years later, in the midst of the political instability following the death of Henry I, David King of Scots sent Scottish raiders under William Fitz Duncan to raid the northern English counties. Calder Abbey was one of the victims, and the Scots raided they despoiled the Abbey and drove out the monks. This, and the poor endowment, led the monks to abandon the site, and they sought sanctuary at Furness Abbey. However, as Abbot Gerold would not resign his abbacy, a dispute arose and they were obliged to leave. They started a wandering life, first to Hood near Thirsk, then to Old Byland, near Rievaulx Abbey, and finally to Stocking where they finally settled and built the great Byland Abbey. However, the monks were worried that Furness would continue to exercise control, and after Gerold travelled to Savigny in France to put his case, they were released from the jurisdiction of Furness in 1142.

Meanwhile, back at Calder, a second attempt at colonisation was made from Furness in about 1142 under Abbot Hardred, and this time they had the protection of Fitz Duncan. The Savigniac order became Cistercian in 1148 when the two orders were amalgamated, and Calder likewise was obliged to follow.

By 1180 a stone church had been built of which the west door is the main survivor today. Most of the rest of building was rebuilt in 1220 in the early English style by Thomas de Multon of Egremont.

The abbey suffered in the wars between England and Scotland - there were Scottish raids in 1216 and 1332, and by 1381 there were just four monks and three lay brothers.

The house was not rich; in 1535 the annual net income was only £50. At the Dissolution, the only recorded relic in the monastery's possession was that of a girdle (a belt) claimed to have belonged to the Virgin Mary.

In 1535 an unfavourable report was made against the abbey and its community by the King's commissioners (though their views are often suspected to be biased and dubiously motivated).

The abbey was surrendered in 1536 by the last abbot, Richard Ponsonby, and nine monks.

== Post-dissolution ==
At the Dissolution Henry VIII gave the abbey to Sir Thomas Leigh, who pulled off the roof and sold it and anything else he could and reduced the church to a ruin. Ownership passed through many secular hands, in which it still remains.

Parts of the south and east ranges of the claustral buildings were incorporated into Calder Abbey House, now a largely early-nineteenth century structure that is still a private residence. Other parts of the abbey remain as a picturesque ruin, no doubt retained by early residents of the newly formed mansion as an ornamental feature. The Abbey and grounds are private, and not open to the public, and new trees obscure much of the view from the surrounding land.

=== Modern celebration ===
In 1934 the 800th anniversary of the foundation was celebrated by a mass held in the ruined abbey. Over 2,000 people attended a celebration led by Dr Thomas Wulstan Pearson, OSB, the Roman Catholic Bishop of Lancaster.

== Remains ==
Ruins still stand of the largely 13th century church and claustral buildings. The church was cruciform, with an aisleless presbytery, transepts each with two eastern chapels, and an aisled nave of five bays. The oldest portions are the west door and parts of the transepts, dated to c.1175. While the plan of the church was typically Cistercian, the church departed from Cistercian norms in the provision of a central tower. The four arches supporting this tower still stand, as do most of the south transept and the north arcade of the nave. The presbytery and north transept are more fragmentary, and their remains are further confused by being incorporated into modern buttresses supporting the tower.

The cloister lay to the south of the church, and was surrounded by three ranges containing the monks' domestic buildings. The east range is well preserved. Immediately adjoining the south transept was the chapter house, rebuilt in the later 13th century. It projected beyond the body of the range and had a vault (part of which survives) and a large east window. To its west was a vestibule, with a central entrance and flanking arches. Unusually, the northern arch leads to a large book cupboard, over which the night stair ran. To the south of the chapter house was the slype, a passage to the cemetery, and then the plan becomes more confused but likely included a day room where the monks worked. Over the whole range was the dormitory, of which large sections of wall with regular lancet windows survive. The south range contained the refectory, but is now difficult to interpret due to its incorporation into the post-Reformation house. The west range, where the lay brothers lived, has entirely disappeared.

The central buildings stood within a walled precinct, of which a 14th-century gatehouse remains.

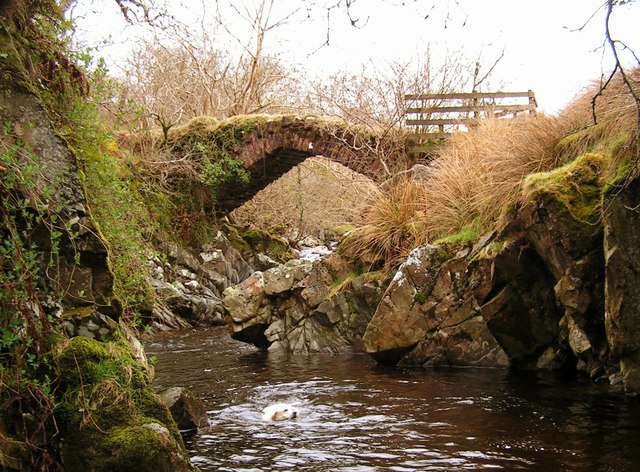
The Monk's Bridge

=== The Monk's Bridge ===
The Monk's Bridge, on Cold Fell, built by the monks of Calder, is the oldest packhorse bridge in Cumbria. It spans the River Calder, just upstream of the confluence with Friar Gill. Also known as "Matty Benn's bridge", it is still in use today and is open to the public.

== See also ==
- Grade I listed buildings in Cumbria
- Listed buildings in St. Bridget Beckermet
- List of monastic houses in Cumbria
- List of monastic houses in England
