= Beckermet =

Village and civil parish in Cumbria, England

Coordinates: 54.446°N 3.516°W

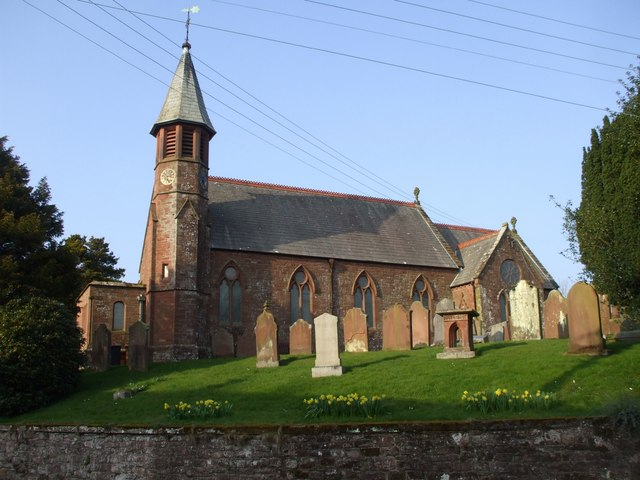
- St John's church in the village centre

- Location in Copeland Borough Location within Cumbria
- Population: 1,619 (2011)
- OS grid reference: NY0106
- Civil parish: Beckermet
- Unitary authority: Cumberland
- Ceremonial county: Cumbria
- Region: North West
- Country: England
- Sovereign state: United Kingdom
- Post town: BECKERMET
- Postcode district: CA21
- Dialling code: 01946
- Police: Cumbria
- Fire: Cumbria
- Ambulance: North West
- UK Parliament: Whitehaven and Workington

Beckermet /bɛˈkɜːrmɪt/ is a village and civil parish in Cumbria, England, between Egremont and Seascale. The parish had a population of 1,619 in the 2011 census.

Historically in Cumberland, it is served by Braystones railway station and is less than a mile west of the A595 road. It is around 2 miles (3 km) from the Sellafield nuclear plant which may be seen from the higher parts of the village.

== Toponymy ==
The natural assumption is that the village is so-named because two becks (local dialect meaning streams- specifically Kirk Beck and Black Beck) meet there. However, the name is pronounced with the accent on the middle syllable (over the years, attempts by people to spell the name as they heard it have resulted in versions like Beck Armett in 1570, and Bekyremet in 1279). In the 12th century there was an h in the middle, the earliest known version, from 1130, being Bechermet, so the English Place-Name Society suggests that the name really means "hermit's stream".

== The two parishes ==
Until May 2011 Beckermet was split between two parishes: Beckermet St Bridget (2001 census population 385) to the south east, and Beckermet St John (pop. 1925) to the north west. Arguably, a third parish should be included, as the parish of Haile (to the northeast) extended to within a few yards of St John's parish church, however this extension contains only fields. St Bridget included most of the small village of Calder Bridge, and the hamlet of High Sella field, along with about half of the nuclear plant. A large portion of the population of St John lived in the former mining community of Thornhill, near Egremont. In May 2011 the parish boundaries were changed, and the parishes of St. Johns and St Bridgets were merged to form the new parish of Beckermet, which include Beckermet, Thornhill and the northern part of the Sellafied nuclear site.

On 22 June 2012 Beckermet Parish Council was renamed Beckermet with Thornhill Parish Council. This was enacted to reflect the closer administrative ties between Beckermet and Thornhill.

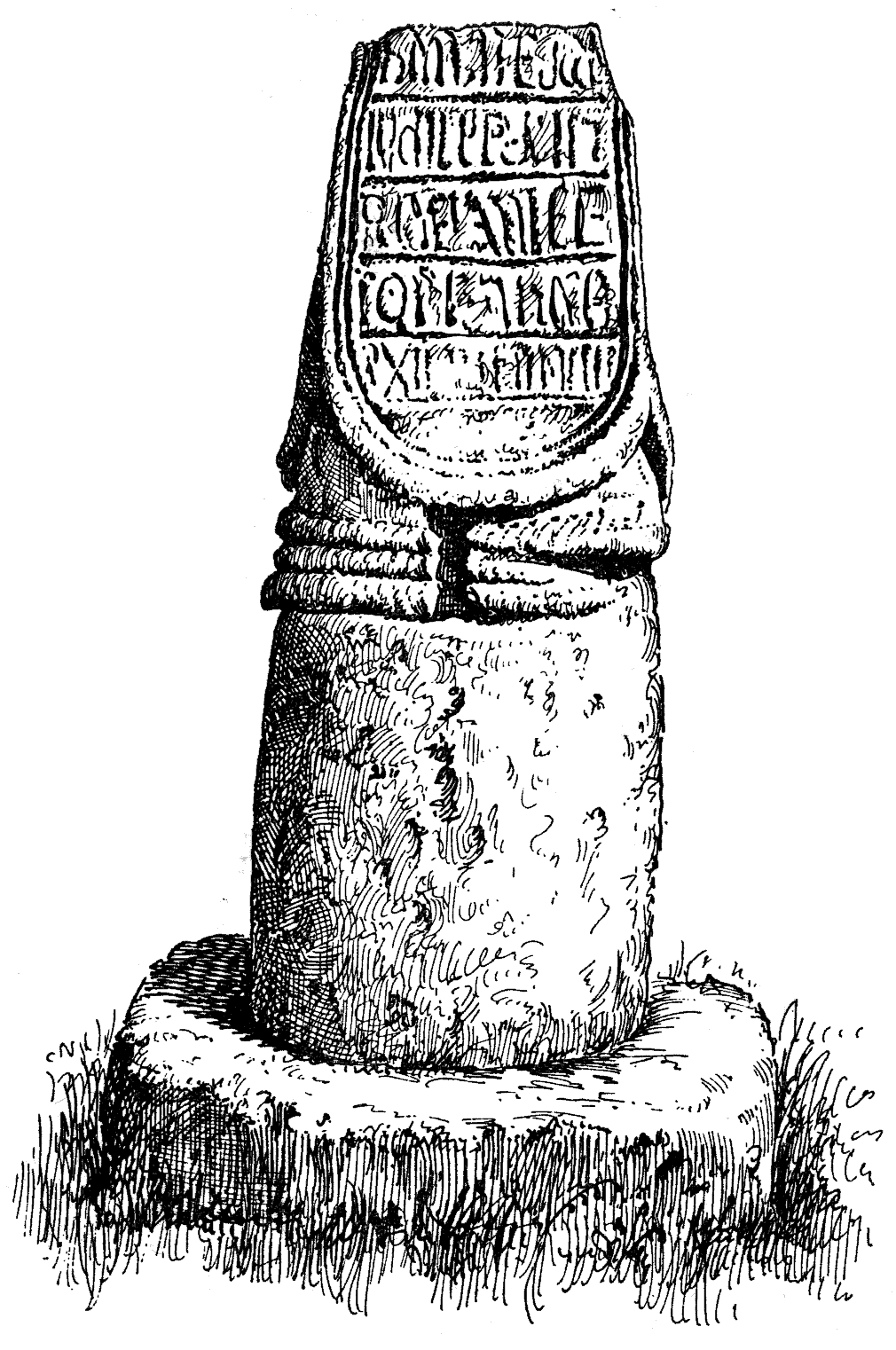
The runic cross stump in old St. Bridget's churchyard

== Governance ==
An electoral ward in the same name exists. This ward stretches beyond the confines of Beckermet parish with a total population of 3,024.

== Transport ==
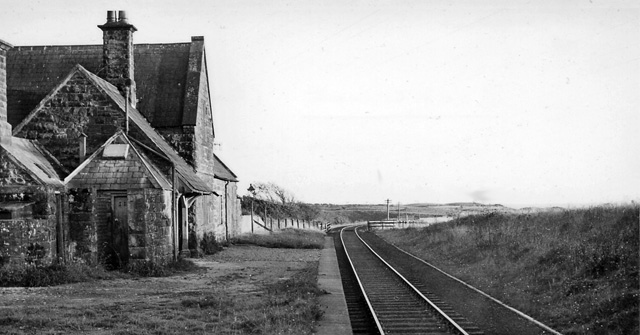
Beckermet railway station, 1961

Beckermet had a station on the Whitehaven, Cleator and Egremont Railway but it closed in 1947, the nearest station in 2016 was Braystones, a limited-service halt on the Cumbrian Coast Line, some 2 km from the village. Bus services 6 and X6 link Beckermet to Whitehaven, Egremont and Seascale.

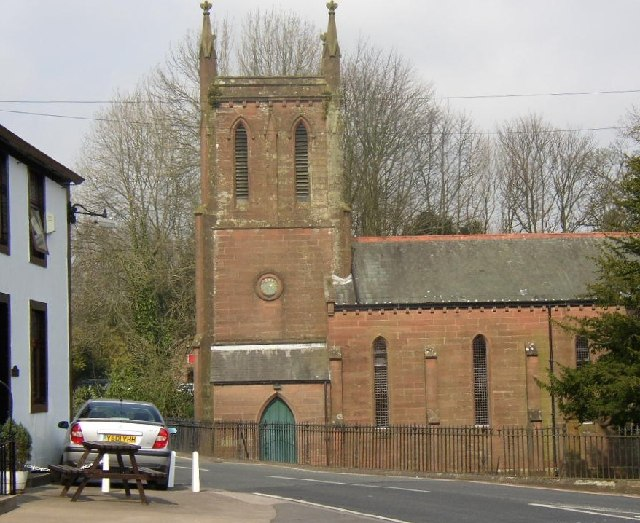
St. Bridget's Church

== Churches ==
The current church of St. Bridget, built in 1842, is at Calder Bridge, but the old "Low Church" about 1 km SW of the village (grid reference NY015061), a plain building of Norman origin with 13th-century modifications, is still used occasionally. In the churchyard are the remains of two ancient crosses, one of which (see picture) has a runic inscription, of which several very contradictory translations have been made. The church of St. John, in the centre of the village, was rebuilt in 1878–1879, but it too has fragments of ancient crosses, and many carved stone medieval coffin lids. The ruined monastery of Calder Abbey is also within St. Bridget's civil parish.

== Castle sites ==
St. John's parish also contains traces of two medieval castles, probably both residences of the le Fleming family, who were granted land in the area shortly after the Norman Conquest of the area. The earlier, at Wodobank near Thornhill, had a defensive motte and possibly an adjoining bailey enclosure. A railway line, itself now abandoned, obliterated most of the remains. The outline of the later fortification, known as Caernarvon Castle, can still be traced in the fields north of the village (grid reference NY021073); it was abandoned about 1250 when the family moved to Coniston. Although Caernarvon was identified as a castle site by a later member of the family, 17th-century historian Sir Daniel Fleming, some experts believe it was never inhabited, and that its alternative name "Coneygarth Cop" may indicate that it was a medieval rabbit warren.

== Landmarks ==
Calder Abbey, which lies by the River Calder just north of Calder Bridge, is a picturesque ruin adjoining Calder Abbey House, a largely 19th-century house which incorporates some remains of the abbey. The village also houses an 18th-century coach house, this is now the White Mare public house. To the south of Calder Bridge, also close to the river, is Sella Park, a 17th-century house incorporating a 14th-century pele tower, restored in the 19th century and now a country house hotel.

More images

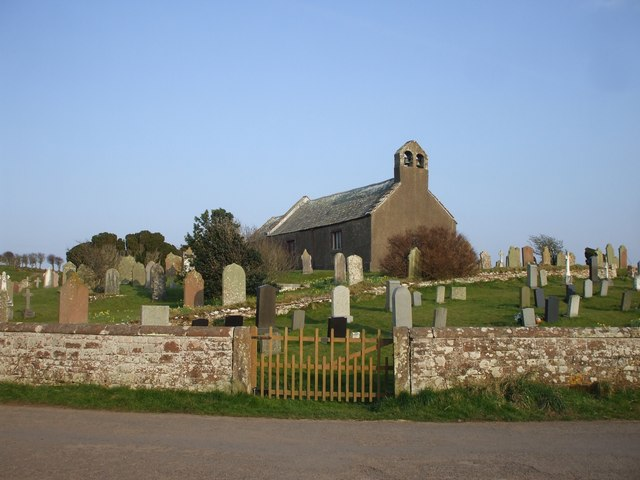
St Bridget's Church, the old "low" church

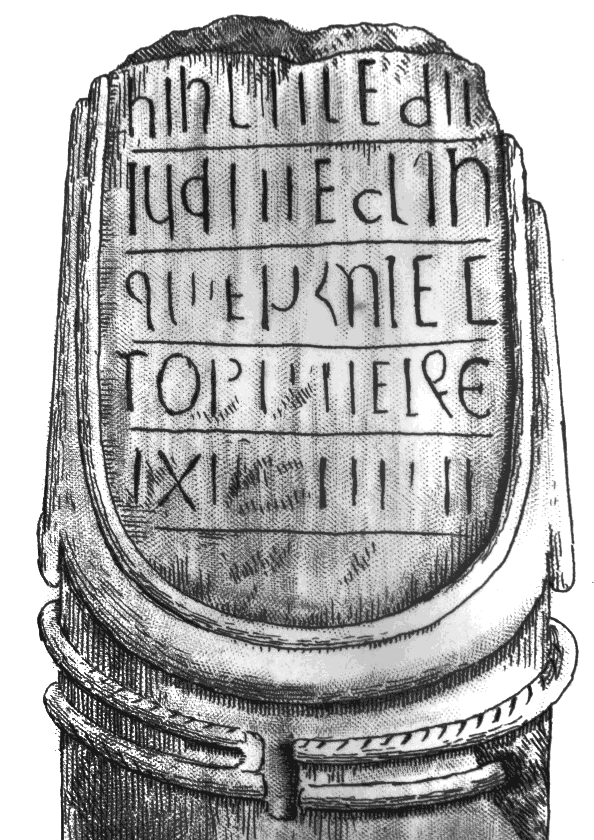
Runic cross top- Lysons 1816

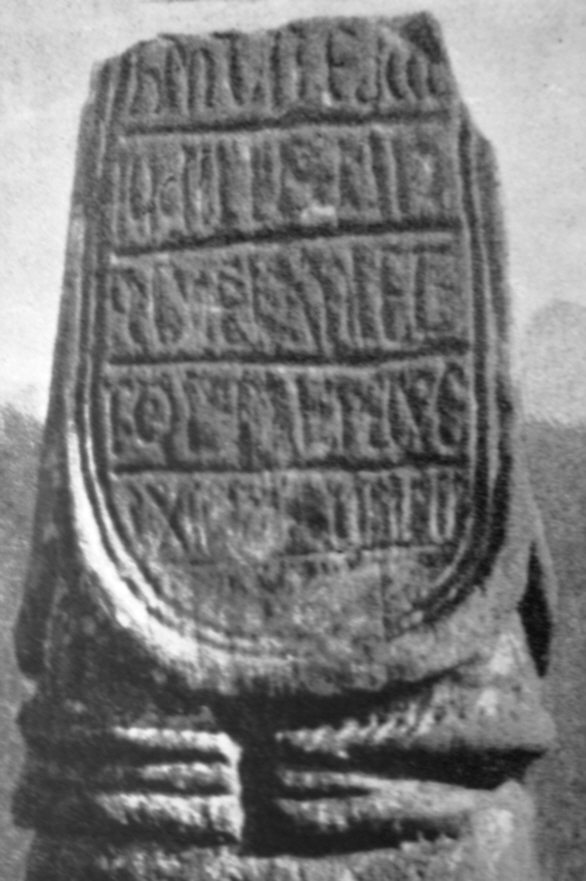
Runic cross top- Victoria History 1901

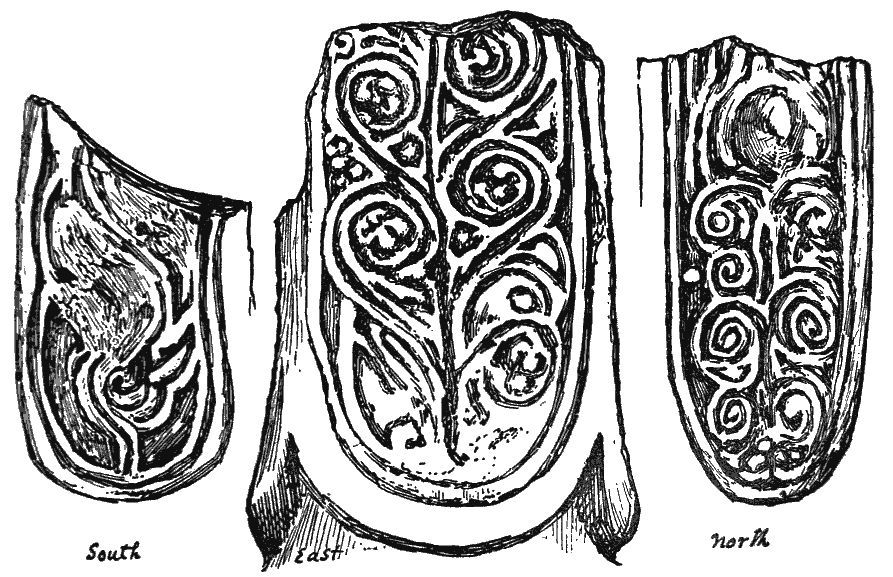
Runic cross back & sides

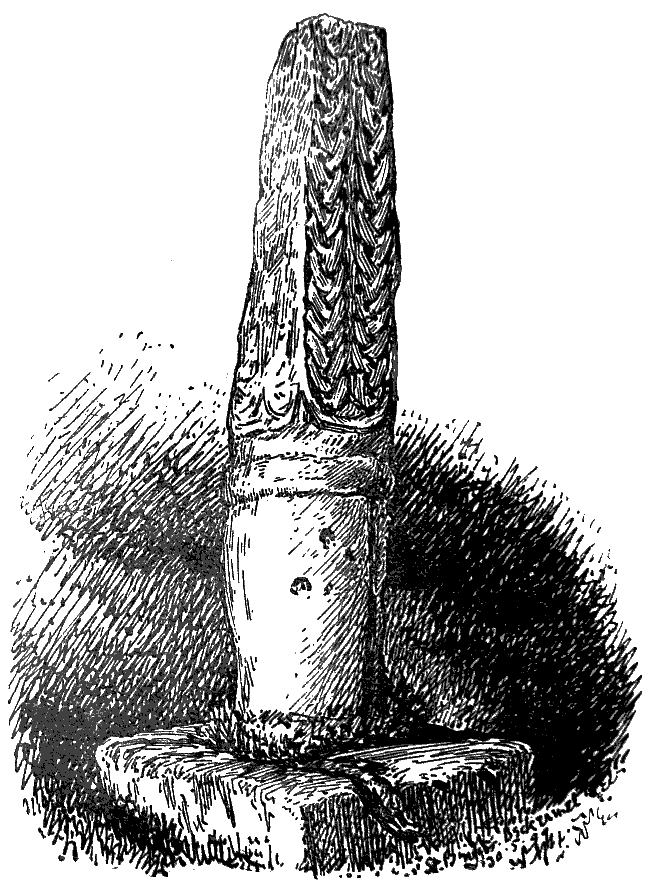
Interlace cross, St. Bridget's

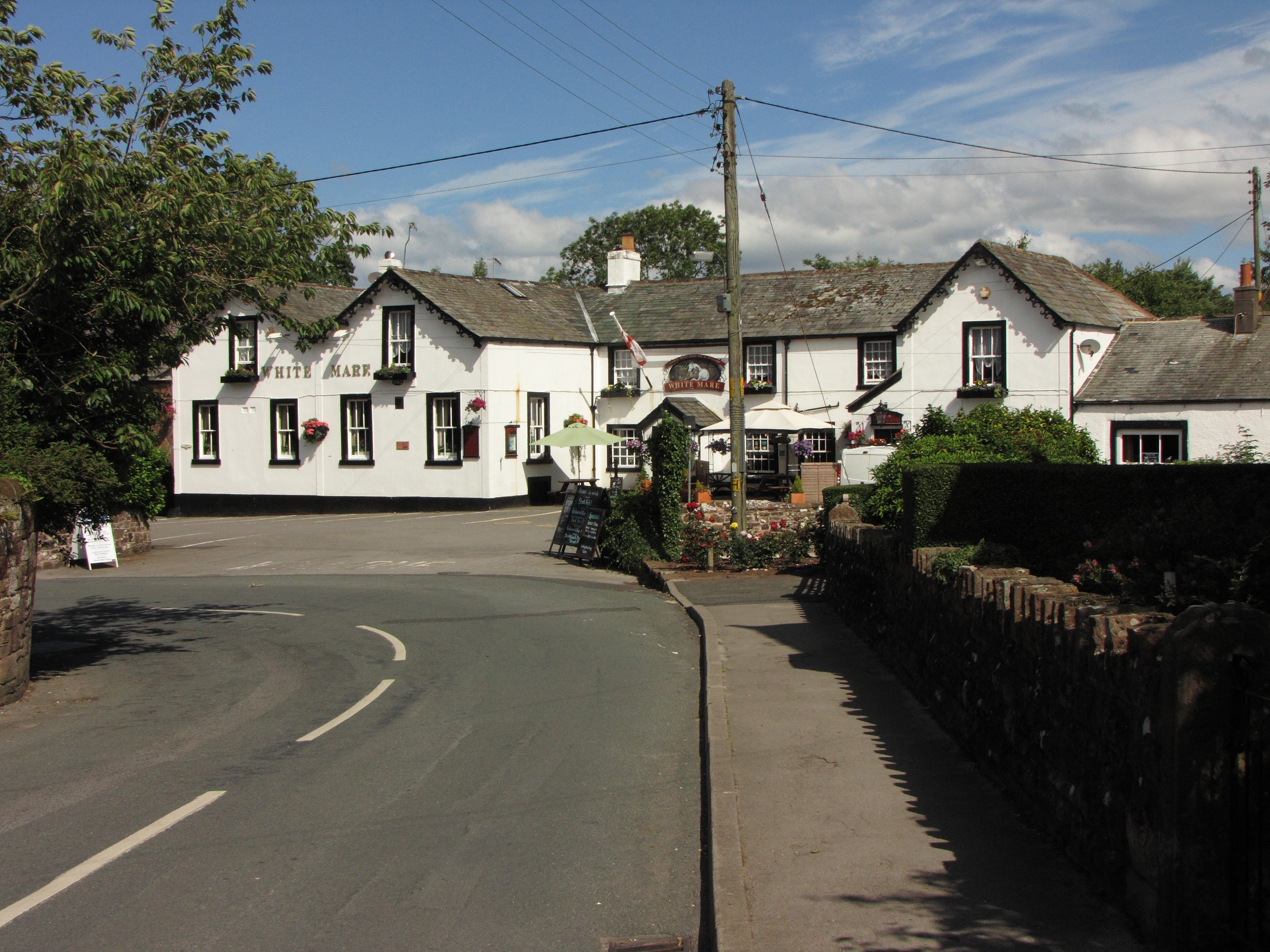
The White Mare

== See also ==
- Listed buildings in St. Bridget Beckermet
- Listed buildings in St. John Beckermet
