= River Calder, Cumbria =

River in Cumbria, England

Coordinates: 54°24′39″N 3°30′17″W

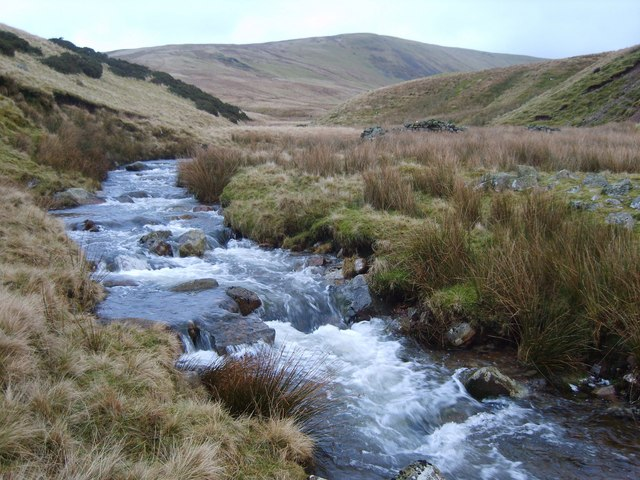
River Calder near to its source on Lankrigg Moss

The River Calder is a river in Cumbria, England.

The river rises at Lankrigg Moss and flows southwards for 10 miles (16 km) through an ancient landscape, flowing under Monks Bridge (a packhorse bridge) and by the site of Calder Abbey, as well as several tumuli and other mysterious monuments. It also runs past and (indirectly) gives its name to Calder Hall, site of the world's first commercial nuclear reactor.

Near its mouth the river runs through the Sellafield nuclear site in an artificially straightened section before flowing into the Irish Sea at the same point as the River Ehen, just southwest of Sellafield.
