= Thornhill, Cumbria =

Village in Cumbria, England

Coordinates: 54.465°N 3.527°W

Thornhill
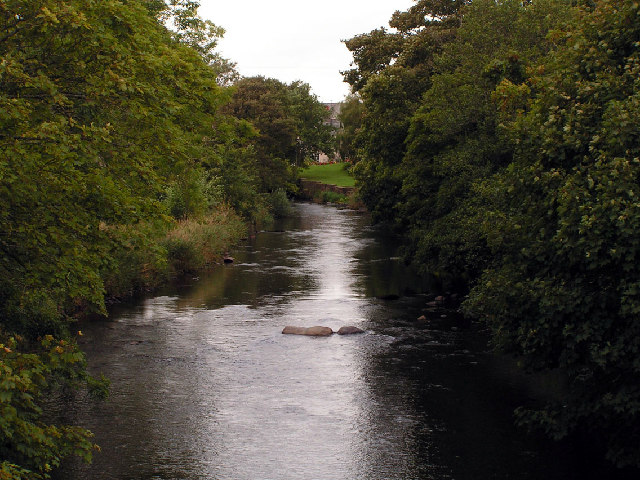
- River Ehen, below Thornhill

- Location in Copeland Borough Location within Cumbria
- OS grid reference: NY010088
- Civil parish: Beckermet
- Unitary authority: Cumberland
- Ceremonial county: Cumbria
- Region: North West
- Country: England
- Sovereign state: United Kingdom
- Post town: EGREMONT
- Postcode district: CA22
- Dialling code: 01946
- Police: Cumbria
- Fire: Cumbria
- Ambulance: North West
- UK Parliament: Penrith and Solway

Thornhill is a village in the county of Cumbria, England, south of Whitehaven and north of Seascale, close to St. Bees, and only a few miles from the Irish Sea. The village was created by Whitehaven Rural District Council and Egremont Urban District Council in the 1920s, as part of the national campaign to improve housing conditions, keeping a promise made by the Government to soldiers fighting the First World War. Tenants moved into the first completed houses, on Thorny Road, late in 1921.

Thornhill is within the ancient parish of St John Beckermet, and Thornhill Mission is an Anglican Church under the Benefice of Beckermet, created so that parishioners would not have to travel to Beckermet to attend church.

In April 2010 The Parishes of St. John's Beckermet and St. Bridgets Beckermet were reorganised to bring both Beckermet and Thornhill into the same parish. This was Beckermet Parish Council, which was renamed in June 2012 to Beckermet with Thornhill Parish Council.

The village is home to a small shop with a sub-post office, and a social club. Thornhill Primary School is also located in the centre of the village. The centre of the village also houses a community park and play area. There is also a football pitch and changing rooms, used by Thornhill Football Club.
