= Gillfoot railway station =

Railway station in Egremont, England

Gillfoot

General information
- Location: Egremont, Cumberland; England
- Coordinates: 54.4928°N 3.5306°W
- Grid reference: NY009119
- Platforms: Unknown

Other information
- Status: Disused

History
- Original company: Whitehaven, Cleator and Egremont Railway

Key dates
- ?: Opened
- ?: Closed
Location

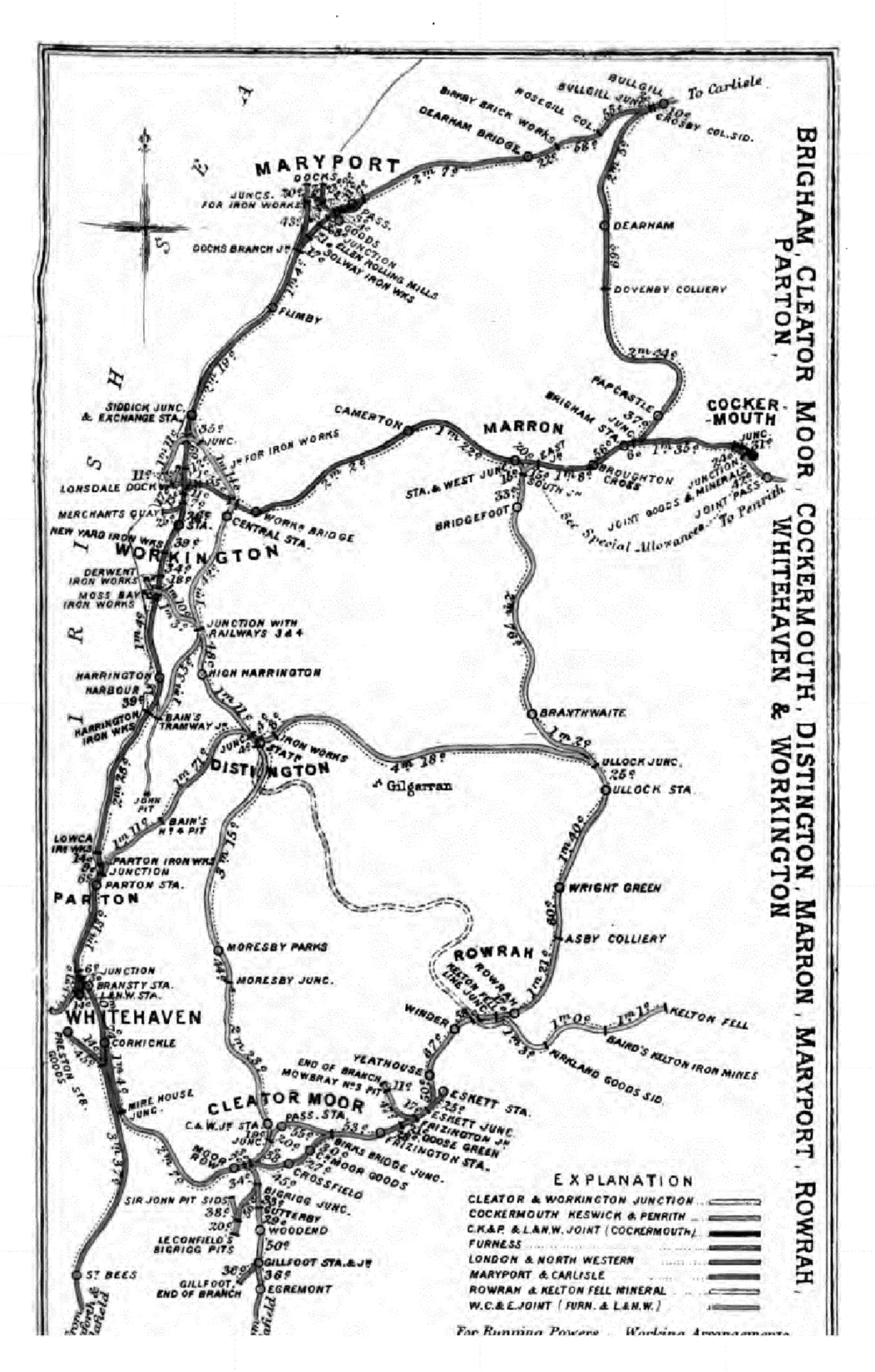
An 1882 Railway Clearing House Junction Diagram showing railways in the area

Gillfoot railway station was on the Whitehaven, Cleator and Egremont Railway line half a mile north of Egremont station, in Cumbria, England.

== History and location ==
The line was one of the fruits of the rapid industrialisation of West Cumberland in the second half of the nineteenth century, opening on 1 July 1857. Gillfoot station appears in the 1882 Railway Clearing House junction diagrams as "Gillfoot Sta. and Jn", shown right, but not in the 1904 edition. It is shown as a goods station in Jowett.

The station site appears in the Engineers' Line Reference database which can be accessed via External links, below.

The station does not appear in other standard works, notably Butt and Croughton, nor is it mentioned in any of the other works listed below, online or on paper. The station site was at the junction of the branch to Gillfoot iron ore mines. This had not been started when the 1867 OS 6" map was surveyed. The junction is plain to see in the overlaid c1900 OS map, but no station or building is evident.

== Afterlife ==
By 2013 the trackbed through the junction was a public footpath.

Preceding station	Disused railways	Following station
Woodend; Line and station closed	LNWR & FR Joint Railway	Egremont (Cumbria); Line and station closed

== See also ==
- Furness Railway
- Cleator and Workington Junction Railway
- Whitehaven, Cleator and Egremont Railway
