= Woodend, Egremont =

Hamlet in Cumbria, England

Coordinates: 54.501°N 3.531°W

Woodend
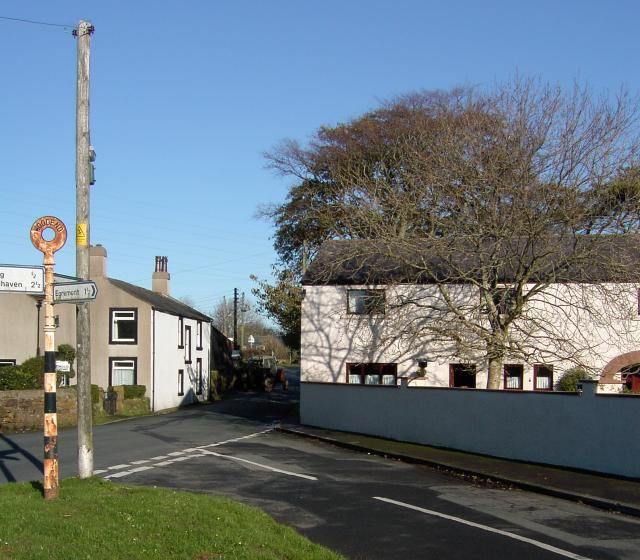
- Woodend

- Location in Copeland Borough Location within Cumbria
- OS grid reference: NY008128
- Civil parish: Egremont
- Unitary authority: Cumberland
- Ceremonial county: Cumbria
- Region: North West
- Country: England
- Sovereign state: United Kingdom
- Post town: EGREMONT
- Postcode district: CA22
- Dialling code: 01946
- Police: Cumbria
- Fire: Cumbria
- Ambulance: North West
- UK Parliament: Whitehaven and Workington

Woodend is a hamlet in the civil parish of Egremont, in the Cumberland district, in the ceremonial county of Cumbria, England. It lies north of Egremont, and east of Bigrigg, on the west of the River Ehen.

Woodend railway station was on the Whitehaven, Cleator and Egremont Railway but it closed in 1947.

Longlands Lake is located very near to this hamlet, as is Clints Quarry.
