= Listed buildings in Haile, Cumbria =

Haile is a civil parish in the Cumberland district, Cumbria, England. It contains nine listed buildings that are recorded in the National Heritage List for England. Of these, two are listed at Grade II*, the middle of the three grades, and the others are at Grade II, the lowest grade. The parish includes the village of Haile, and is otherwise rural, The listed buildings comprise a country house and its gatehouse range, smaller houses, a barn, a church, and three milestones.

== Key ==
Grade	Criteria
II*	Particularly important buildings of more than special interest
II	Buildings of national importance and special interest

== Buildings ==
Name and location	Photograph	Date	Notes	Grade
Haile Hall; 54.46846°N 3.48929°W		1591	A country house that was extended in the 17th and 18th centuries. It is roughcast with ashlar dressings and a slate roof. There are three storeys, and a south front of five bays. The house has a central doorway, and sash windows with moulded surrounds; the windows in the top floor are horizontally-sliding. The west front has four gabled bays, and contains windows that are mullioned, or mullioned and transomed, and a Venetian window containing sashes. The north and east fronts have windows of varying types. The north front also has an entrance with a dated lintel and a bellcote.	II*
Gatehouse range, Haile Hall; 54.46806°N 3.48963°W	—	16th or 17th century	The range is in stone with a slate roof, and has an L-shaped plan. On the south front is a two-storey bay containing a segmental archway, above which is a panel with an armorial. It contains windows of varying types, and on the ridge is a weathervane. The west front has a lean-to outshut, a gabled projection with an ogee window, a first floor entrance, and pigeon openings. The north front has a blocked chamfered entrance, and steps leading up to a first floor doorway.	II*
Haile Church; 54.46542°N 3.49734°W		18th century	The church contains fragments of earlier material. Alterations, including the addition of a west porch, were made in 1882–83 by C. J. Ferguson. The church is in stone, partly roughcast, with a cornice and a slate roof with coped gables. It consists of a nave and chancel in a single cell, and a lean-to west porch. There is a cross on the east gable, and a double gabled bellcote on the west gable. The windows are round-headed with voussoirs.	II
Milestone; 54.46180°N 3.49261°W	—	Early 19th century (probable)	The milestone consists of a square post with a pyramidal top. It has two faces that are inscribed with the distances in miles to nearby destinations.	II
Milestone; 54.46446°N 3.49196°W	—	Early 19th century (probable)	The milestone consists of a square post with a pyramidal top. It has two faces that are inscribed with the distances in miles to nearby destinations.	II
Milestone; 54.47768°N 3.45983°W	—	Early 19th century (probable)	The milestone consists of a square post with a pyramidal top. It has three faces that are inscribed with the distances in miles to Haile, Wilton and Egremont.	II
Orchard Brow; 54.46280°N 3.49187°W	—	Early 19th century	A house in roughcast stone with ashlar dressings and a slate roof. There are two storeys and three bays. The windows are sashes with plain surrounds, and above the door is a fanlight.	II
Barn, Orchard Brow; 54.46258°N 3.49206°W	—	Early 19th century	The barn is in stone with a slate roof. There are various openings, including three cow house entrances, a larger entrance with an elliptical head, a winnowing door, and ventilations slits.	II
Woodlands Cottage; 54.46248°N 3.49374°W	—	Early 19th century (probable)	The house is in roughcast stone, and has a slate roof with coped gables. There are two storeys and four bays, and lean-to outshuts on the west and south fronts. The windows are mullioned with small-paned glazing, and there is a 20th-century gabled porch.	II
