= Beckermet Mines railway station =

Disused railway station in Cumbria, England

Beckermet Mines

General information
- Location: West of Haile, Cumberland; England
- Coordinates: 54.4642°N 3.5060°W
- Grid reference: NY024086
- Platforms: Unknown

Other information
- Status: Disused

History
- Original company: LNWR & FR Joint Railway

Key dates
- 15 January 1912: opened for workmen's services
- after 1923: Closed
Location

Beckermet Mines railway station was situated at Pit No.1 of the mine of the same name. It was used by workmen's trains which travelled along a branch which curved eastwards off the Moor Row to Sellafield line, primarily to handle the iron ore lifted at the site.

The mine was opened in 1903 in open country west of the hamlet of Haile, Cumbria, England. The site's surroundings remained rural in 2013.

== History and location ==
The line off which the branch was built was one of the fruits of the rapid industrialisation of West Cumberland in the second half of the nineteenth century. Tracks were laid southwards from Whitehaven and Moor Row as far as Egremont by the Whitehaven, Cleator and Egremont Railway, opening to passengers on 1 July 1857. By the 1860s the company sought to extend southwards from Egremont to meet the coastal line at Sellafield, aiming for Millom, Barrow-in-Furness and beyond. The Furness opposed this, but the two companies came to an accommodation and built the Egremont to Sellafield extension as a joint line.

When winnable ore was found north east of Beckermet some years later the railway was well placed to serve it, with a workmen's service being a natural consequence in the days long before mass car ownership and road public transport. Beckermet Mine and its workmen's halt were Twentieth Century additions to the line. Services began in 1912 with three trains each way daily from Moor Row, calling at Woodend, Egremont and St Thomas Cross Platform.

The station was very likely to have been an unstaffed halt, no platform is identified as such on contemporary OS maps. The mine's products continued to be taken away by rail until the 1970s.

== Rundown and closure ==
An online source gives the mine's closure date as 1973, whilst three books give it as 1980. Both sides could be right, as Florence, Ullcoats and Beckermet mines were joined underground in their later years. The mine's product was the last traffic on any of the lines built by the Whitehaven, Cleator and Egremont Railway. The "main line" off which the branch was built closed when Beckermet Mine closed, all the way back to Corkickle. It lay unused until 1993, when it was lifted.

The exact date the workmen's service ended is not yet confirmed.

== Afterlife ==
By 2013 the site of the mine was occupied by the Beckermet Industrial Estate with road access only.

Preceding station	Disused railways	Following station
St Thomas Cross Platform; Line and station closed	LNWR & FR Joint Railway	Terminus

== See also ==
- Furness Railway
- Cleator and Workington Junction Railway
- Whitehaven, Cleator and Egremont Railway
- British quarrying and mining narrow gauge railways
