= Beckermet railway station =

Disused railway station in Cumbria, England

Beckermet
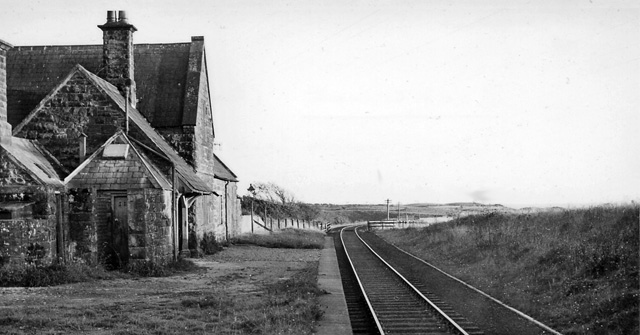
- Beckermet railway station, 1961

General information
- Location: Beckermet, Cumberland; England
- Coordinates: 54.4450°N 3.5198°W
- Grid reference: NY015065
- Platforms: 2

Other information
- Status: Disused

History
- Original company: LNWR & FR Joint Railway
- Post-grouping: London, Midland and Scottish Railway

Key dates
- 2 August 1869: Opened
- 7 January 1935: Closed to passengers
- 11 March 1940: Reopened to workmen's trains
- 8 April 1940: Closed
- 6 May 1946: Reopened
- 16 June 1947: Closed
- 1953: Reopened for workmen's trains to Sellafield
- 6 September 1965: Workmen's trains ended
Location

Beckermet railway station is a disused rail station located in the village of Beckermet in Cumbria.

Tracks were laid southwards from Whitehaven and Moor Row as far as Egremont by the Whitehaven, Cleator and Egremont Railway, opening to passengers on 1 July 1857.

By the 1860s, the Whitehaven, Cleator and Egremont Railway company sought to extend southwards from Egremont to meet the coastal line at Sellafield, aiming for Millom, Barrow-in-Furness and beyond. The Whitehaven and Furness Junction Railway company opposed this, so the two companies came to an accommodation and built the Egremont to Sellafield extension as a joint line. Beckermet was the sole intermediate passenger station on the extension.

The station was on the western edge of the village in Cumbria, England.

== History ==
The line to Egremont was one of the fruits of the rapid industrialisation of West Cumberland in the second half of the nineteenth century, opening to passengers on 1 July 1857. Egremont remained as the railway's southern terminus until 1869 when the company, in partnership with the Furness Railway, built a southern extension from Egremont to the coast line at Sellafield, with an intermediate station at Beckermet. This enabled traffic from the Cleator Moor and Rowrah areas, especially iron ore, to move much more readily southwards.

== Services ==
In 1922 five northbound passenger trains left Beckermet, two connected with trains to Whitehaven at Moor Row, all the others continued there without a change. A Saturdays Only evening train terminated at Moor Row. The southbound service was similar. There were no Sunday trains.

The LNWR and Furness Joint Railway divided traffic responsibilities so that passenger traffic through the station was usually worked by the Furness Railway.

Goods traffic was typical of an industrial area, sustaining sidings and goods depots long after passenger services were withdrawn.

Mineral traffic was the dominant flow, though this was subject to considerable fluctuation with trade cycles. A considerable amount of iron ore travelled south through Beckermet bound for the furnaces of Millom and Barrow-in-Furness.

Stations and signalling along the line south of Rowrah were changed during the Joint regime to conform to Furness Railway standards.

== Rundown and closure ==
The station closed on 7 January 1935 when normal passenger traffic ended along the line.

Life flickered briefly in Spring 1940 when workmen's trains were reinstated to support a period of high activity building the Royal Ordnance Factory at Drigg, but that lasted less than a month.

A public Sellafield-Egremont-Beckermet-Moor Row-Whitehaven service was reinstated on 6 May 1946, only to be "suspended" on 16 June 1947, a victim of the post-war fuel crisis. Bradshaw still listed the service as Suspended in 1949. It was never reinstated.

Workmen's trains to Sellafield ended on 6 September 1965.

Remarkably, a wholly new unadvertised passenger service started in September 1964, conveying pupils to Wyndham School in Egremont from Seascale in the morning then home after school. Initially this comprised eight steam-hauled carriages, ending typically formed of a pair of Derby Lightweight 2-car units. Sources differ on when this service ended: 3 March 1969 or 11 December 1969. Sources are silent on whether this called at Beckermet or passed straight through.

Preceding station	Disused railways	Following station
St Thomas Cross Platform; Line and station closed	LNWR and FR Joint Railway	Sellafield; Line closed, station open

== See also ==
- Furness Railway
- Cleator and Workington Junction Railway
- Whitehaven, Cleator and Egremont Railway
