= St Thomas Cross Platform railway station =

Former railway station in England

St Thomas Cross Platform

General information
- Location: Cringlethwaite, Egremont, Cumberland; England
- Coordinates: 54.4765°N 3.5224°W
- Grid reference: NY014100
- Platforms: Unknown

Other information
- Status: Disused

History
- Original company: LNWR & FR Joint Railway
- Post-grouping: London Midland and Scottish Railway

Key dates
- 15 January 1912: opened for workmen's services
- by 1933: Closed
Location

St Thomas Cross Platform was a railway station used by workmen's trains on the Moor Row to Sellafield line on what is now the southeastern, Cringlethwaite, edge of Egremont, Cumbria, England.

== History and location ==
The line on which the halt was built was one of the fruits of the rapid industrialisation of West Cumberland in the second half of the nineteenth century. Tracks were laid southwards from Whitehaven and Moor Row as far as Egremont by the Whitehaven, Cleator and Egremont Railway, opening to passengers on 1 July 1857. By the 1860s the company sought to extend southwards from Egremont to meet the coastal line at Sellafield, aiming for Millom, Barrow-in-Furness and beyond. The Furness opposed this, but the two companies came to an accommodation and built the Egremont to Sellafield extension as a joint line.

St Thomas Cross Platform was a Twentieth Century addition to the line. A service from Moor Row to Beckermet Mines, calling at Woodend, Egremont and St Thomas Cross was started on 15 January 1912, though it is possible that other workmen's services called before then, as Florence Mine was nearby.

The use of the term "Platform" usually signified that a station was an unstaffed halt. The halt must have been closed by 1933, when the structure was demolished. It was used by workers at the nearby Florence mine, which went on to be the last operating iron ore mine, as opposed to quarry, in Western Europe. It closed in 2008.

The halt does not appear on the relevant 1928 Railway Clearing House junction diagram or in Jowett.

The station is not marked on contemporary OS maps up to 6" to the Mile, but an unlabelled building with a footpath to the road is shown in the right place on the Cumberland 1:2,500 scale OS map linked below via Old OS Maps.

== Afterlife ==
By 2013 the trackbed through the halt was clearly visible on satellite images, but the site itself appeared to be privately occupied.

Preceding station	Disused railways	Following station
Egremont (Cumbria); Line and station closed	LNWR & FR Joint Railway	Beckermet Mines; Line and station closed
Egremont (Cumbria); Line and station closed	LNWR & FR Joint Railway	Beckermet; Line and station closed

== See also ==
- Furness Railway
- Cleator and Workington Junction Railway
- Whitehaven, Cleator and Egremont Railway
