= Listed buildings in Drigg and Carleton =

Drigg and Carleton is a civil parish located in the Cumberland district of Cumbria, England. It contains eight listed buildings that are recorded in the National Heritage List for England. All the listed buildings are designated at Grade II, the lowest of the three grades, which is applied to "buildings of national importance and special interest". The parish contains the villages of Drigg and Holmrook and the surrounding countryside. All the listed buildings are houses or farmhouses and associated structures.

== Buildings ==
Name and location	Photograph	Date	Notes
Rose Cottage; 54.37924°N 3.43375°W	—	Mid 18th century	A stuccoed house that has a slate roof with coped gables. There are two storeys and two bays, and a lean-to outbuilding on the left. On the front is a trellised porch, and the windows are sashes with plain surrounds.
Bell Hill Farmhouse; 54.36922°N 3.41470°W	—	1768	A roughcast farmhouse with quoins and a slate roof. There are two storeys and three bays, and a lower wing to the right. The central entrance has a plain surround and a pediment inscribed with the date. The windows are 20th-century casements.
Carleton Green; 54.37452°N 3.41463°W	—	1748	A stuccoed house with ashlar dressings on a rusticated plinth, with a string course, and a slate roof with coped gables. There are two storeys and six bays, the outer bays projecting forward. On the front is a porch, and the windows are sashes.
Entrance gateway and walls, Carleton Hall; 54.37723°N 3.41452°W	—	Late 18th century (probable)	The gateway and walls are stuccoed with ashlar dressings. The gate piers have rusticated alternate block shafts, and pyramid finials, and adjacent to the left pier is an archway. The entrance is flanked by serpentine walls.
Cumblands; 54.36738°N 3.41115°W	—	Late 18th century	A brick farmhouse, partly stuccoed, on an ashlar plinth, with ashlar dressings, quoins, a frieze, and a slate roof. There are two storeys with an attic, and three bays. The windows are sashes with ashlar surrounds, and the central entrance has an architrave and a pediment. On the northeast front are two gabled dormers, and on the southwest front is a blocked elliptical-headed cart entrance.
Carleton Hall and outbuildings 54.37612°N 3.41410°W		c. 1785	A stuccoed house with ashlar dressings and a slate roof. It has two storeys, the central part has three bays, and this is flanked by lower two-bay wings, the left bay of the left wing protruding with a hipped roof. The central part has a moulded plinth, a frieze, a cornice, and coped gables. On the front is a porch with Doric columns, a frieze and a cornice. There are outbuildings to the southeast and southwest, forming a courtyard, and they include a cart entrance and a pitching hole. Apart from a few casement windows in the outbuildings, most of the windows are sashes.
Drigg Hall, outbuildings and wall 54.37869°N 3.43836°W	—	1795	The house is roughcast with ashlar dressings, it has two storeys and an attic, three bays, and a one-bay extension to the right. The house has a frieze, a cornice and a pediment containing a traceried oculus. There is a central Tuscan doorway with a pediment, and the windows are sashes with plain surrounds with an elliptical-headed opening. The house is flanked by barns. The barn to the right is in brick with stone dressings and has an elliptical-headed cart entrance. The left barn is in stone, it has an entrance with a timber lintel and a datestone. At the front is a garden wall that has gate piers decorated with scrolls.
The Cottage; 54.37093°N 3.41416°W	—	Late 18th or early 19th century	A stuccoed house with a hipped slate roof. There are two storeys, and fronts of three bays. Most of the windows are sashes. On the west front is a blocked round-headed entrance, on the north front the central bay is canted with a hipped roof, and in the south front is a gabled porch.
