= Egremont railway station =

Disused railway station in Cumbria, England

Egremont

General information
- Location: Egremont, Cumbria, Cumberland; England
- Coordinates: 54.4861°N 3.5289°W
- Grid reference: NY010111
- Platforms: 2

Other information
- Status: Disused

History
- Original company: Whitehaven, Cleator and Egremont Railway
- Pre-grouping: LNWR & FR Joint Railway
- Post-grouping: London, Midland and Scottish Railway

Key dates
- 1 July 1857: Opened
- 7 January 1935: Closed to passengers
- 11 March 1940: Reopened to workmen's trains
- 8 April 1940: Closed
- 6 May 1946: Reopened
- 16 June 1947: Closed, but remained open for workmen's trains
- 6 September 1965: Workmen's trains ended
- 11 December 1969: School service ended, station closed
Location
- Location within the former Borough of Copeland Location within Cumbria

The Egremont railway station was built by the Whitehaven, Cleator and Egremont Railway as the first southern terminus of what would become the Moor Row to Sellafield branch. In 1878 the company was bought out by the LNWR and Furness Railway who operated the line jointly until grouping in 1923.

The station was towards the northern end of the town, in Cumbria, England.

== History ==
The line was one of the fruits of the rapid industrialisation of West Cumberland in the second half of the nineteenth century, opening to passengers on 1 July 1857.

The station remained as the railway's southern terminus until 1869 when the company, in partnership with the Furness Railway, built a southern extension from Egremont to the coast line at Sellafield, with an intermediate station at Beckermet. This enabled traffic from the Cleator Moor and Rowrah areas, especially iron ore, to move much more readily southwards.

== Services ==
In 1922 eight northbound passenger trains left Egremont, two connected with trains to Whitehaven at Moor Row, all the others continued there without a change. A Saturdays Only evening train terminated at Moor Row. The southbound service was similar. There were no Sunday trains.

The LNWR and Furness Joint Railway divided traffic responsibilities so that passenger traffic through the station was usually worked by the Furness Railway.

A three times a day unadvertised workmen's service from Moor Row to Beckermet Mines began on 15 January 1912, calling at Woodend, Egremont and St Thomas Cross Platform. It is not yet clear when this came to an end or if other services were provided.

Goods traffic was typical of an industrial area, sustaining sidings and goods depots long after passenger services were withdrawn.

In 1946, the Milk Marketing Board opened a dairy on the eastern side of the goods yard. The dairy had a siding where milk tanks were filled and was worked by its own diesel shunter. These tanks were worked to Carlisle and then south down the West Coast Mainline to London.

Mineral traffic was the dominant flow, though this was subject to considerable fluctuation with trade cycles. A considerable amount of iron ore travelled south through and from Egremont bound for the furnaces of Millom and Barrow-in-Furness.

Stations and signalling along the line south of Rowrah were changed during the Joint regime to conform to Furness Railway standards.

== Rundown and closure ==
The station closed on 7 January 1935 when normal passenger traffic ended along the line.

Life flickered briefly in Spring 1940 when workmen's trains were reinstated to support a period of high activity building the Royal Ordnance Factory at Drigg, but that lasted less than a month.

A public Sellafield-Egremont-Moor Row-Whitehaven service was reinstated on 6 May 1946, only to be "suspended" on 16 June 1947, a victim of the post-war fuel crisis. Bradshaw still listed the service as Suspended in 1949. It was never reinstated.

Workmen's trains to Sellafield ended on 6 September 1965.

Remarkably, a wholly new unadvertised passenger service started in September 1964, conveying pupils to Wyndham School in Egremont from Seascale in the morning then home after school. Initially this comprised eight steam-hauled carriages, ending typically formed of a pair of Derby Lightweight 2-car units. Sources differ on when this service ended:- 3 March 1969 or 11 December 1969.

Iron Ore from Beckermet Mines continued to pass through the station site until 1980, after which the line was closed and lifted.

== Afterlife ==
By 2013 satellite images appeared to show that the route through Egremont was a sliver of Public Open Space. The route of the line south of Egremont through to the junction with the Cumbrian Coast Line can be traced on satellite images with some ease, forming the western boundary of the village of Thornhill, passing to the west of the centre of the village of Beckermet and curving to join the coast line between the bridge over the River Ehen and Sellafield Station.

Preceding station	Disused railways	Following station
Woodend; Line and station closed	LNWR & FR Joint Railway	St Thomas Cross Platform; Line and station closed

== See also ==
- Furness Railway
- Cleator and Workington Junction Railway
- Whitehaven, Cleator and Egremont Railway
