= Haile, Cumbria =

Village in Cumbria, England

Coordinates: 54.464°N 3.492°W

Haile
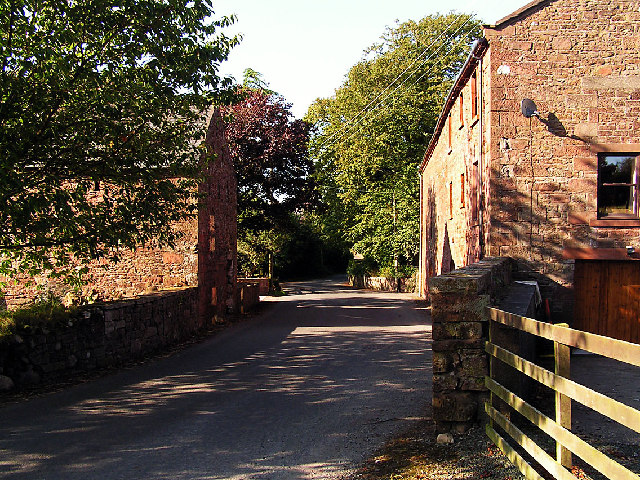
- Haile village

- Location in former Copeland Borough Location within Cumbria
- Population: 617 (2011 census)
- OS grid reference: NY035091
- Civil parish: Haile
- Unitary authority: Cumberland
- Ceremonial county: Cumbria
- Region: North West
- Country: England
- Sovereign state: United Kingdom
- Post town: Egremont
- Postcode district: CA22
- Dialling code: 01946
- Police: Cumbria
- Fire: Cumbria
- Ambulance: North West
- UK Parliament: Whitehaven and Workington

Haile is a small village and civil parish in Cumberland district, in the county of Cumbria, England. It had a population of 617 at the 2011 census.

Nearby settlements include the town of Egremont and the villages of Thornhill and Beckermet. For transport there is the A595 road nearby. The village stands high, and is exposed to the west winds. The parish is situated near the River Ellen, and comprised the townships of Hale and Wilton.

== History ==
In 1870-72, John Marius Wilson's Imperial Gazetteer of England and Wales described Haile as "a parish in Whitehaven district, Cumberland; near Copeland forest, the river Eden, and the Whitehaven and Furness railway, 2½ miles SSE of Egremont. It includes the hamlet of Wilton; and its post town is Egremont, under Whitehaven. Acres, 3, 220".

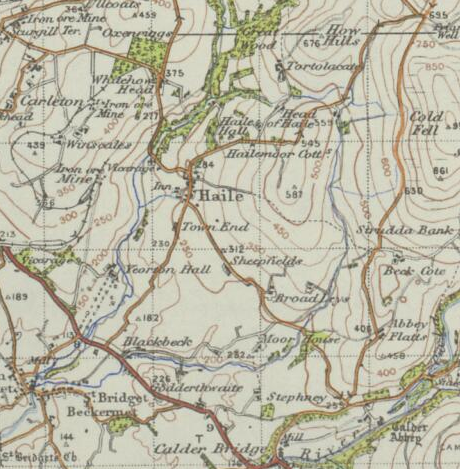
A 20th-century map of the Haile area

=== Haile Hall ===
Haile Hall is the historic seat of the Ponsonby family. It dates from 1591 with later additions.

=== Parish church ===
Haile Parish Church is a small church located in a vale just outside the village. It is surrounded by a churchyard and mature trees. According to an entry in the Archbishops' Council (Church of England) website, the "little church at Haile, with no dedication, has Georgian plain arched windows, but the walls are medieval. The west porch was added by Ferguson in 1882, and the Church restoration took place mainly in 1883. A South-East quoin in the nave is part of a Saxon cross-shaft, with scrolls. Outside against the West wall is a monument to John Ponsonby (1670, while the window depicting St George and the dragon, is a memorial to a later Ponsonby, who died in 1952".

The village hall has its basis in work, commenced in 1879, on a new Haile and Wilton School. It was used as a school until its closure in 1955. The building was then maintained by Haile Church until 1974 when it was transferred to an independent charity and established as Haile Village Hall. It was refurbished in 2000.

== Demographics ==
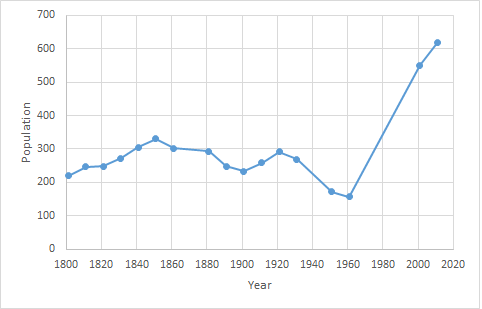
Total population of Haile Civil Parish, Cumbria as reported by the census of population 1801 to 2011 (note that differences in census boundary may imply an increase in (relative) census area rather than in (absolute) population)

According to the 2011 census, Haile then had a population of 617.

=== Occupations ===
In 1881 the majority of jobs in Haile were in the agricultural sector, having a total of around 70 people out of 266 people in work. There was a high number of unknown occupations for women. Also, during this time the majority of workers were male with 183/266 out of the total workforce. However, comparing the occupations to the 2011 census shows the change in equality in terms of the number of people working, with 164 males and 161 female. The jobs have also shifted from the agricultural sector to the professional and public sector. In 1881, Haile only had 3 people who were known professionals, compared to 108 in 2011.

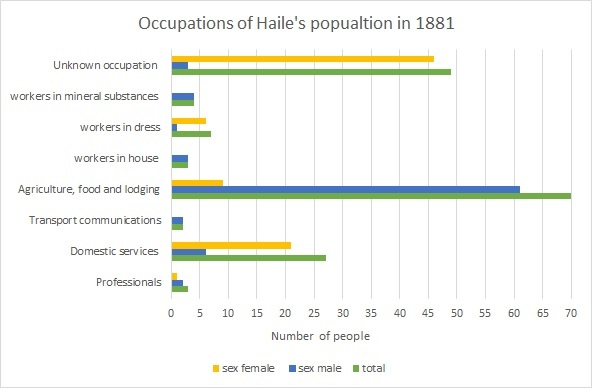
Occupations of the people of Haile in 1881.

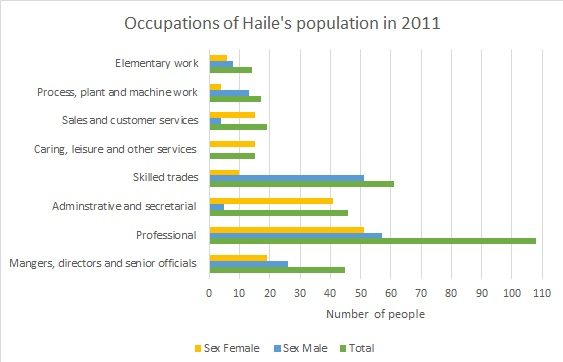
Occupations of the people of Haile in 2011.

=== Housing ===
The total numbers of houses follows a similar trend to the population of Haile, increasing to 59 households in 1931, then declining to 49 in 1961. Due to different defining boundaries according to the Neighborhood statistics in 2011 there were 259 households. In 1921 there was on average 6 rooms per house, whereas in 2011 there were on average 8-9 rooms per household.

The accommodations of Haile in 2011 were mostly detached whole houses or bungalows, having a total of 170 houses out of 259. 41 houses were semi-detached whole houses or bungalows, and 46 were terraced whole houses, flats or bungalows. Only 0.8% of households are overcrowded based on a standard definition using the numbers of inhabitants and rooms. Vacant housing is slightly higher than the national average, but only 2% have a lack of central heating whereas in England as a whole it is 2.7%.

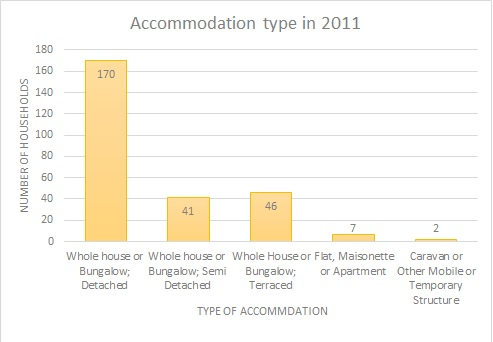
Accommodation types 2011

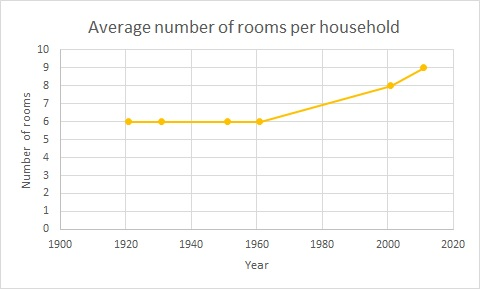
The average number of rooms per household in Haile throughout the years.

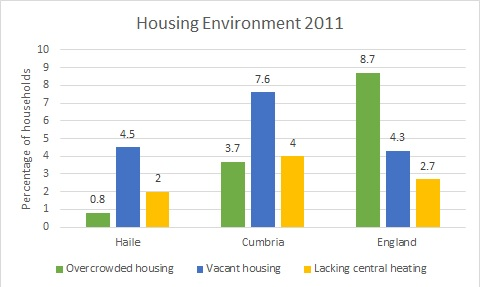
The housing quality of Haile compared to Cumbria and England in terms of overcrowding, vacant houses and lack of heating.

=== Education ===
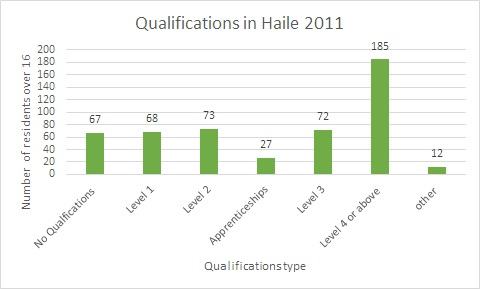
Qualifications of the people in Haile according to the 2011 census

In Haile a total of 504 people are over 16, with 67 of them gaining no qualifications. This is above the national average. In 2011 22.3% of over 16 residents gained no qualifications, whereas in Haile it is a low 13.3%. On average most people have a level 4 or above qualification (185/504). According to the Office for National Statistics in England, 27% of people over 16 have a level 4 or above qualification, however in Haile it is higher at 36.7%. Comparing Haile to the 2001 and 2011 census data shows significant improvements in its education system, with 50% of people having level 3 or above qualifications, compared to 33% in 2001.

There is no school in Haile, and the closest primary school is Beckermet school, approximately 1.5 miles away, The closest secondary school is West Lakes Academy, 2.2. miles away.

=== Transport and crime ===
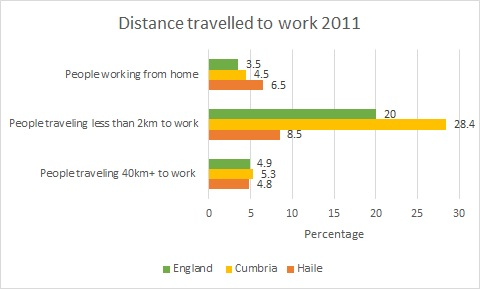
Distance travelled to work on average in Haile, Cumbria and England in 2011.

On average in Haile, more people work at home then compared to the rest of the country with 6.5% compared to 3.5%. However, both in Cumbria and England, a lot more people travel less than 2 km to work than people in Haile. For example, in Cumbria 28.4% do so, whereas in Haile, it's only 8.5% of people.

Crime is relativity low in Haile, with an overall crime rate of 26.1 per 1000 population, compared to England with 37.6.

== Sport ==
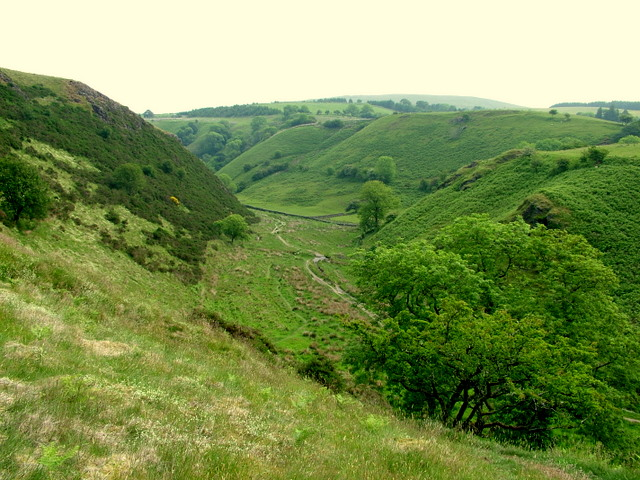
Haile countryside

Sport facilities near Haile include Egremont Rangers ARLFC.

== See also ==
- Listed buildings in Haile, Cumbria
