= John Ponsonby (British Army officer) =

British Army officer (1866–1952)

Major-General Sir John Ponsonby KCB CMG DSO
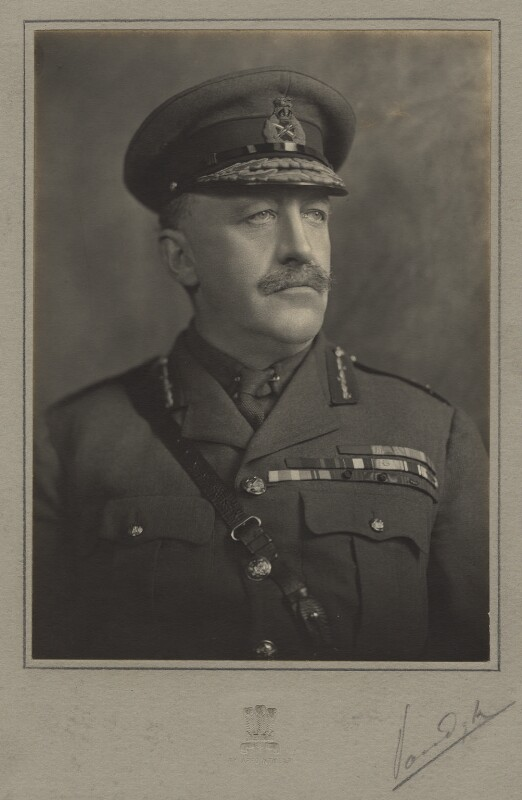
- Born: 25 March 1866; Windsor, Berkshire, England
- Died: 26 March 1952 (aged 86); Haile, Cumbria, England
- Burial place: Haile Parish Church, Haile, Cumbria, England
- Military career
- Allegiance: United Kingdom
- Branch: British Army
- Service years: 1888–1928
- Rank: Major-General
- Unit: Coldstream Guards
- Commands: Madras District; 5th Division; 40th Division; 2nd Guards Brigade; 1st Battalion, Coldstream Guards
- Conflicts: Second Boer War; First World War
- Awards: Knight Commander of the Order of the Bath; Companion of the Order of St Michael and St George; Distinguished Service Order; Mentioned in dispatches

Major General Sir John Ponsonby, KCB, CMG, DSO (25 March 1866 – 26 March 1952) was a British Army officer who commanded the 5th Division during the final months of the First World War.

== Military career ==
Born the son of Sir Henry Ponsonby and educated at Eton College, Ponsonby was commissioned as a lieutenant into the 3rd (2nd Derbyshire Militia) Battalion, Sherwood Foresters, in March 1886. After obtaining a Regular Army commission in the Royal Irish Rifles (later the Royal Ulster Rifles) in November 1887, he transferred into the Coldstream Guards in August 1888.

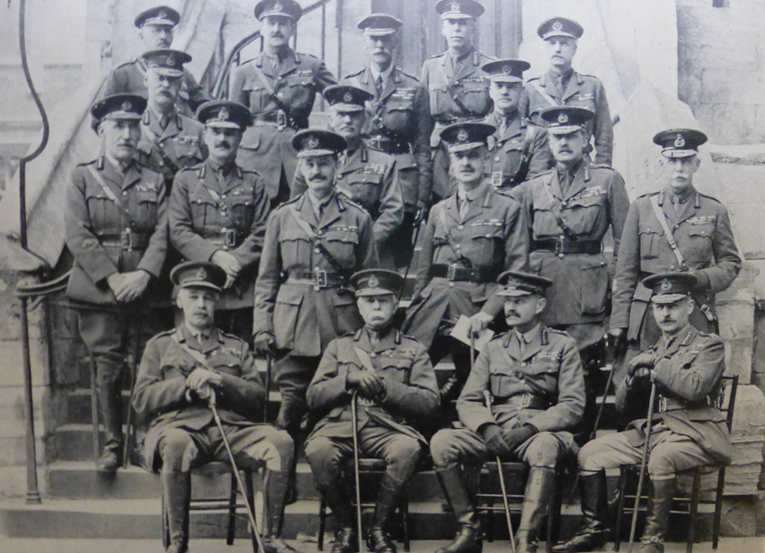
Eighteen Old Etonian generals revisit Eton, May 1919. Major General Ponsonby is stood in the back row on the extreme left.

After being seconded for service by the Foreign Office in January 1898, he served in Uganda later that year and was seconded for service in the Second Boer War in South Africa in March 1900, and attached to the Rhodesian Field Force. By now a captain, having been promoted to that rank in July 1901, he was appointed a Companion of the Distinguished Service Order in October 1901. He was again sent to South Africa in February 1902.

He was promoted from supernumerary captain to substantive captain on 21 March 1903, to major on 23 January 1904 and on 1 March 1905 was appointed commandant of the Guards Depot back in Britain, taking over from Julian Steele.

In October 1913 he was made a lieutenant colonel and succeeded Lieutenant Colonel Hugh Sutton as commanding officer of the 1st Battalion, Coldstream Guards, part of the 1st (Guards) Brigade.

Ponsonby fought in the First World War and had been appointed a Companion of the Order of St Michael and St George in February 1915. He received a promotion to the temporary rank of brigadier general in August 1915, when he was made general officer commanding of the 2nd Guards Brigade, part of the Guards Division, which he led at the Battle of Loos. He was promoted to brevet colonel in January 1916 and remained in command of his brigade throughout the rest of the year, including during the Battle of the Somme. After being promoted to temporary major general in September 1917, succeeded Major General Harold Ruggles-Brise as GOC of the 40th Division, leading his division at the Battle of Cambrai later that year. His substantive rank was advanced to colonel in November 1917. In July 1918 he went on to become GOC 5th Division, remaining in that role until the end of the war, leading it throughout the Hundred Days Offensive until the Armistice of 11 November 1918 which ended the war.

After the war Ponsonby, whose rank of major general was made permanent on 1 January 1919, became GOC Madras District of India on 11 September 1922. In May 1925, after the death of General Sir Thomas Morland, he was appointed as colonel of the Suffolk Regiment.

He was appointed a Knight Commander of the Order of the Bath (KCB) in the 1927 Birthday Honours and retired from the army in June 1927.

== Family ==
In 1935 Ponsonby married Mary (Mollie) Robley; they had no children. He lived at Haile Hall near Beckermet in Cumbria.

Military offices
Preceded by Harold Ruggles-Brise	GOC 40th Division; 1917–1918	Succeeded by William Peyton
Preceded by Reginald Stephens	GOC 5th Division; 1918–1919	Succeeded by Hugh Jeudwine
Honorary titles
Preceded by Sir Thomas Morland	Colonel of the Suffolk Regiment; 1925–1939	Succeeded by Walter Nicholson
