= Woodend railway station =

Disused railway station in Cumbria, England

Woodend for Cleator and Bigrigg

General information
- Location: Woodend, Egremont, Cumberland; England
- Coordinates: 54.5020°N 3.5308°W
- Grid reference: NY009129
- Platforms: 2

Other information
- Status: Disused

History
- Original company: Whitehaven, Cleator and Egremont Railway
- Pre-grouping: LNWR & FR Joint Railway
- Post-grouping: London, Midland and Scottish Railway

Key dates
- 1 March 1880: Opened
- 7 January 1935: Closed to passengers
- 11 March 1940: Reopened to workmen's trains
- 8 April 1940: Closed
- 6 May 1946: Reopened
- 16 June 1947: Closed, but remained open for workmen's trains
- 7 November 1955: Closed but used for occasional special trains
- 6 September 1965: closed completely
Location
- Location within the former Borough of Copeland Location within Cumbria

Woodend railway station (formally known as "Woodend for Cleator and Bigrigg") was planned by the Whitehaven, Cleator and Egremont Railway on its Sellafield to Moor Row branch, but by the time the station opened the company had been bought out by the LNWR and Furness Railway who operated the line jointly until grouping in 1923.

The station was in the hamlet of Wood End and served the villages in its full name, in Cumbria, England.

== History ==
The line was one of the fruits of the rapid industrialisation of West Cumberland in the second half of the nineteenth century. The station was a later addition, opening to passengers on 1 March 1880.

== Services ==
In 1922 eight northbound passenger trains called at Woodend, two connected with trains to Whitehaven at Moor Row, all the others continued there without a change. A Saturdays Only evening train terminated at Moor Row. The southbound service was similar. There were no Sunday trains.

The LNWR and Furness Joint Railway divided traffic responsibilities so that passenger traffic through the station was usually worked by the Furness Railway.

A three times a day unadvertised workmen's service from Moor Row to Beckermet Mines began on 15 January 1912, calling at Woodend, Egremont and St Thomas Cross Platform. It is not yet clear when this came to an end or if other workmen's services were provided.

Goods traffic was typical of an industrial area, sustaining sidings and goods depots long after passenger services were withdrawn.

Mineral traffic was the dominant flow, though this was subject to considerable fluctuation with trade cycles. A considerable amount of iron ore travelled south through Woodend bound for the furnaces of Millom and Barrow-in-Furness.

Stations and signalling along the line south of Rowrah were changed during the Joint regime to conform to Furness Railway standards.

== Rundown and closure ==
The station closed on 7 January 1935 when normal passenger traffic ended along the line.

Life flickered briefly in Spring 1940 when workmen's trains were reinstated to support a period of high activity building the Royal Ordnance Factory at Drigg, but that lasted less than a month.

A public Sellafield-Egremont-Moor Row-Whitehaven service was reinstated on 6 May 1946, only to be "suspended" on 16 June 1947, a victim of the post-war fuel crisis. Bradshaw still listed the service as Suspended in 1949. It was never reinstated.

One authority states that unadvertised workmen's trains were withdrawn on 7 November 1955, Two other sources, both with local knowledge, state that a workmen's service was started from Moor Row in 1953, calling at Woodend, Egremont and Beckermet en route to Sellafield for the nuclear plant. This service lasted until 6 September 1965.This was the end for passenger services at Woodend.

Declining quantities of freight continued to pass through the station site. The line south of Beckermet Quarry was taken out of use in January 1970, removing the possibility of diversionary or other through traffic to Sellafield and beyond. The final traffic was iron ore from Beckermet Mine. The mine closed on 3 October 1980, with the line from the site to Corkickle through Woodend closing on 1 November 1980, laying unused until it was lifted in 1993.

== Afterlife ==
By 2008 Woodend station house was a private residence.

| Preceding station | Disused railways | Following station |
|---|---|---|
| Moor Row; Line and station closed | LNWR & Furness Joint Railway | Egremont; Line and station closed |

== See also ==
- Furness Railway
- Cleator and Workington Junction Railway
- Whitehaven, Cleator and Egremont Railway
