= Wilton, Cumbria =

Hamlet in Cumbria, England

Coordinates: 54.485°N 3.487°W

Wilton
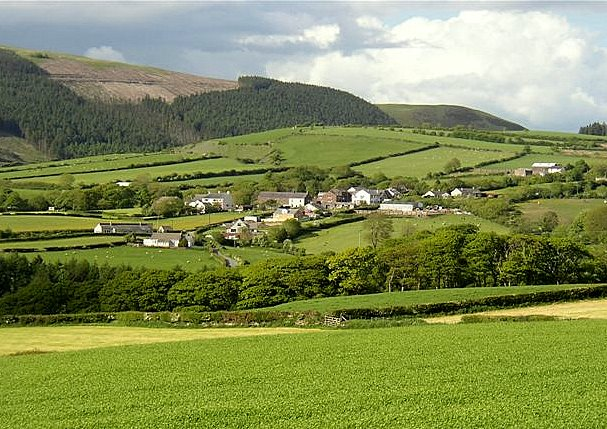
- Wilton

- Location in Copeland Borough Location within Cumbria
- OS grid reference: NY036110
- Civil parish: Haile
- Unitary authority: Cumberland
- Ceremonial county: Cumbria
- Region: North West
- Country: England
- Sovereign state: United Kingdom
- Post town: EGREMONT
- Postcode district: CA22
- Dialling code: 01946
- Police: Cumbria
- Fire: Cumbria
- Ambulance: North West
- UK Parliament: Whitehaven and Workington

Wilton is a hamlet in the Cumberland district, in the county of Cumbria, England. It is near the small town of Egremont. In 1870-72 it had a population of 253. It was one of the sites involved in a 2010 shooting spree spanning Cumbria, when 52-year-old Derrick Bird shot several residents of Wilton, killing a couple.
