= St John, Bigrigg =

Coordinates: 54.5096°N 3.5493°W

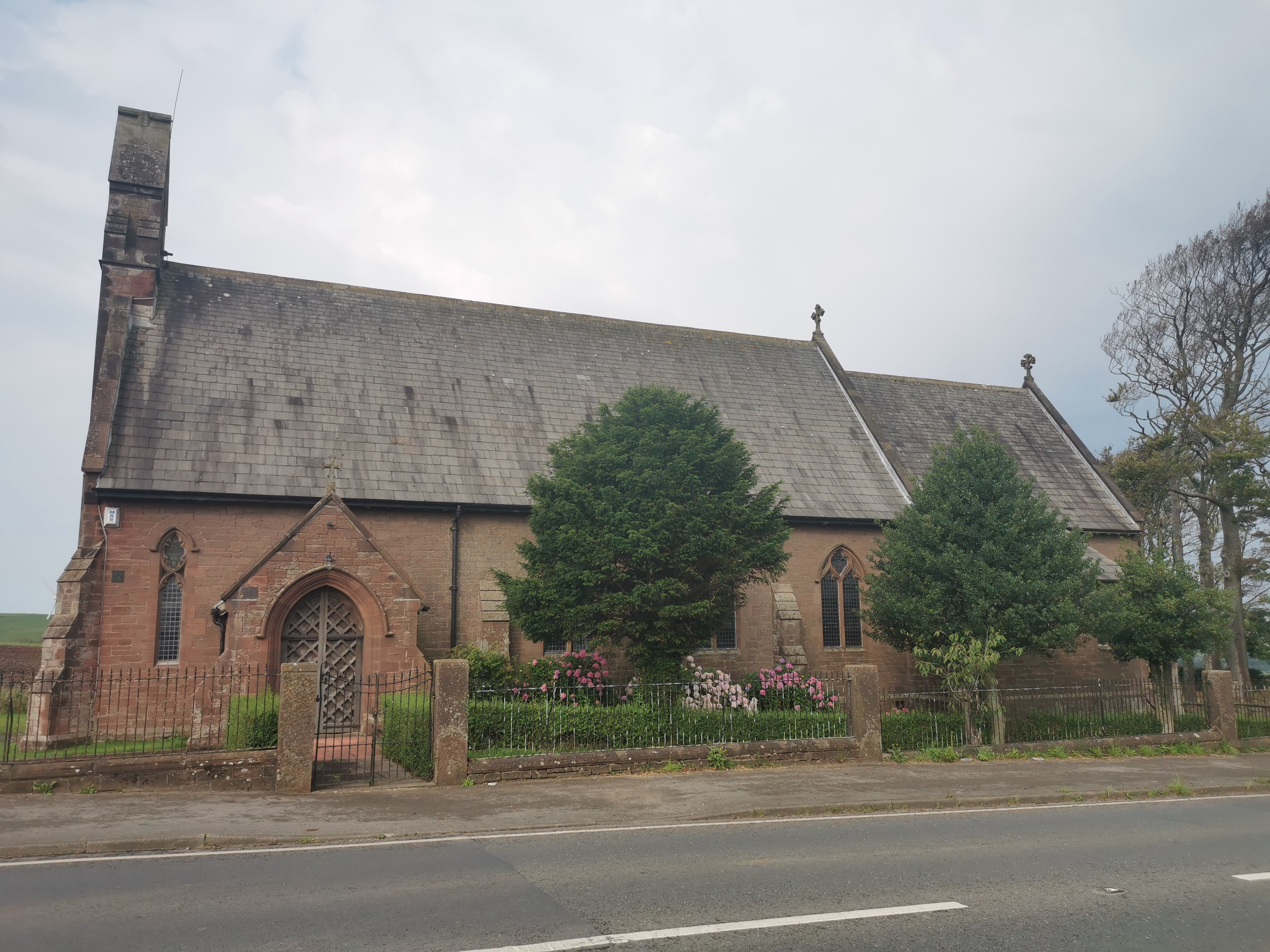
- St John, Bigrigg

- Location in Cumbria
- OS grid reference: NX 9978613813
- Location: Bigrigg, Cumbria
- Country: England
- Denomination: Anglican

History
- Status: Parish church

Administration
- Province: York
- Diocese: Carlisle
- Archdeaconry: West Cumberland
- Deanery: Calder
- Parish: Cleator

Clergy
- Vicar: Rev'd Melanie Appleby

St John, Bigrigg is an Anglican church near Bigrigg, in Cumbria in northern England. It is in the deanery of Calder, and the diocese of Carlisle. Its benefice is Egremont. The church is a Grade II listed building.
