= Egremont Castle =

Castle in Cumbria, England

Coordinates: 54.47993°N 3.52970°W

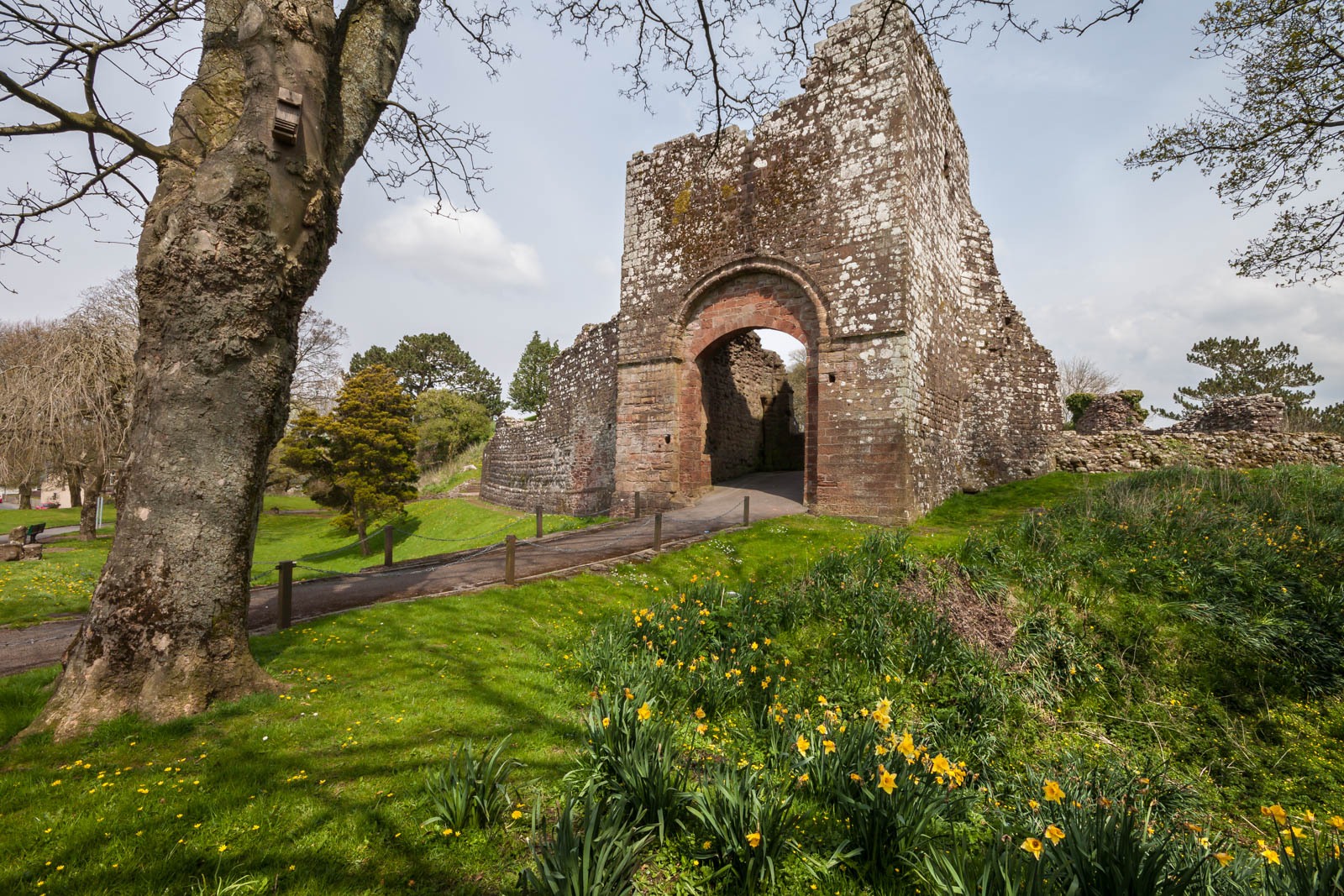
Entrance to Egremont Castle in Cumbria, 2016

Egremont Castle is located in the town of Egremont, Cumbria (grid reference NY00981050).

== History ==
The original castle was built on a mound above the River Ehen on the site of a Danish fort following the conquest of Cumberland in 1092 by William II of England. The present castle was built by William Meschin, who founded the castle between 1120 and 1135. Further additions were made in the 13th century. It eventually fell into disuse and became the ruin it is today.

The castle provided protection for the town which William also created. The long wide street provided a marketplace for traders, who were granted privileges and given security in return for payment of tolls. Some of the profits were undoubtedly used by this founding father of Egremont in the foundation of St Bees Priory, dedicated to Saint Bega, at St Bees on the Cumbrian coast.

The castle is of Motte-and-bailey design.

It is said to have once possessed a horn which only the rightful heir could blow. The legend was the subject of William Wordsworth's poem The Horn of Egremont Castle.

== In popular culture ==
An idealised view of the castle (as a painting in progress) appears as a detail on the cover of The Big Lad in the Windmill, the 1986 debut album by the band It Bites (three-quarters of whom grew up in Egremont).

== See also ==
- Grade I listed buildings in Cumbria
- Listed buildings in Egremont, Cumbria
