= Bigrigg =

Village in Cumbria, England

Coordinates: 54.5028°N 3.543543°W

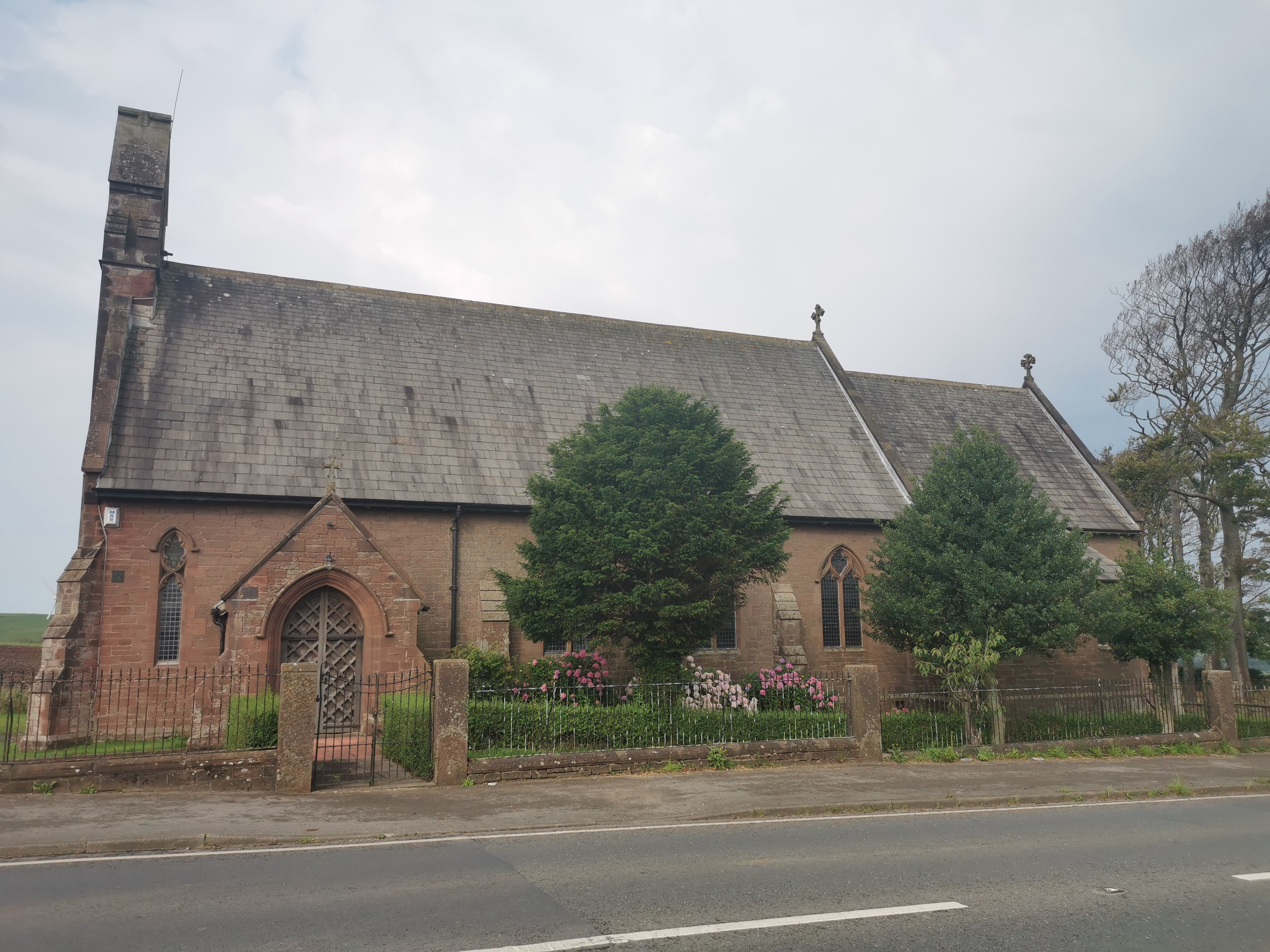
- St John's Church

- Location in Copeland Borough Location within Cumbria
- Population: 1,200
- OS grid reference: NY0014313038
- Civil parish: Egremont
- Unitary authority: Cumberland
- Ceremonial county: Cumbria
- Region: North West
- Country: England
- Sovereign state: United Kingdom
- Post town: EGREMONT
- Postcode district: CA22
- Dialling code: 01946
- Police: Cumbria
- Fire: Cumbria
- Ambulance: North West
- UK Parliament: Whitehaven and Workington

Bigrigg /ˈbɪɡrɪɡˈ/ is a village in the civil parish of Egremont, in the Cumberland district, in the ceremonial county of Cumbria, England. Until 1974 it was in the historic county of Cumberland. From 1974 to 2023 it was in Copeland district.

Bigrigg is 2 miles (3 km) north of the town of Egremont on the A595 road. Bigrigg Moor is surrounded by farmland and watered by the River Ehen. Deep hollows in the area attest to iron ore mining as far back as medieval times. Bigrigg's calcite deposits were considered to be of the highest quality.

== History ==
In 1829, there were three different companies mining eight pits in the area. Iron ore mining continued to expand from this time. Further encouragement for mining resulted when Whitehaven, Cleator and Egremont Railway opened for goods traffic in 1855. Pits often flooded due to the proximity of the River Ehen, in nearby Egremont, so the mining companies diverted the river. By the late 1800s some mines were closing in the area while others continued to open. In 1924 a mine disaster at the Croft Pit in Bigrigg trapped ten men for 28 hours before they were rescued. By 1932 all the mines were closed.

== Church ==
St John's Church in the village was built by C.J. Ferguson in 1878–80 in the Decorated style. Its stained glass memorial windows are by Charles Kempe.

== Village Hall ==
The village got its first 'Jubilee Hall' in 1935, and the village turned out for its official opening, unfortunately, hearsay says that the hall blew down in a heavy wind within a few years of opening. A further hall was built on the same spot which stood the test of time becoming a boat repair yard during the 70's and at the beginning of the 21st century it was knocked down and as of 2020 is Mitchell's Minis, a motor vehicle bodyworks offering repairs for all makes of motor cars, specialising in repairs and restoration work for classic Minis.

== Old School and Chapel ==
The school was opened in 1868 and closed in 1968, it appears that it has been extended at least three times during its history, it has recently been converted into apartments but the exterior structure has not been altered.

== Pub ==
The Old Captains House (formerly Old Captain's Table, Ship).

== Plane crash at Bigrigg in 1947 ==
During a routine training flight from its base at RAF Silloth a mechanical failure prompted a forced landing. The pilot chose a field near St John's Church at Bigrigg as he came in to land the wing of the aircraft struck a tree and it span onto the ground bursting into flames. What remained of the aircraft continued skidding across the ground breaking up as it went. The cockpit crossed a small road (A595) Narrowly missing a van and ended up on the grass verge burning fiercely. The crew escaped unhurt but badly shaken, they were taken to hospital by the van driver. The local police placed a guard on the aircraft until it was removed by a salvage team.

== See also ==
- Listed buildings in Egremont, Cumbria
