= Drigg =

Village in Cumbria, England

Coordinates: 54.378°N 3.440°W

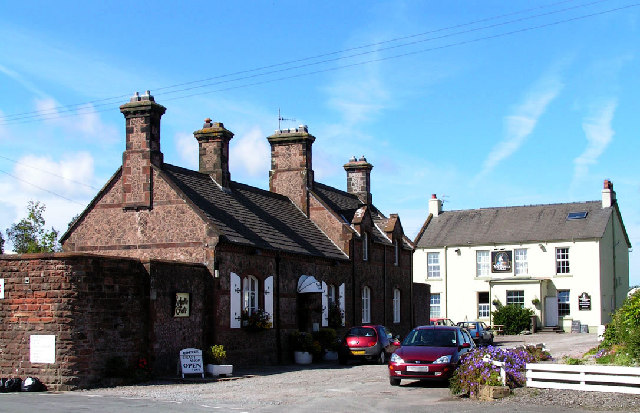
- Drigg railway station and the Victoria Inn

- Location within Cumbria
- Population: 449 (2011)
- OS grid reference: SD064990
- Civil parish: Drigg and Carleton
- Unitary authority: Cumberland
- Ceremonial county: Cumbria
- Region: North West
- Country: England
- Sovereign state: United Kingdom
- Post town: HOLMROOK
- Postcode district: CA19
- Dialling code: 019467
- Police: Cumbria
- Fire: Cumbria
- Ambulance: North West
- UK Parliament: Whitehaven and Workington
- Website: drigg.org.uk

Drigg is a village on the coast of the Irish Sea in the Cumberland district of the county of Cumbria, England. It borders the Lake District National Park. Next to the village is the site of the UK's low-level radioactive waste storage facility.

== Geography ==
Drigg sits to the north of the River Irt, with Carleton to the south of the river. The river runs from Wastwater lake and joins the River Mite just before it enters the Irish Sea. There are three bridges over the Irt within the parish; the A595 road bridge at Holmrook, the Cumbrian Coast Line railway bridge at the head of the tidal estuary near Ravenglass, and a footpath via an old packhorse bridge at Drigg Holme.

Sand dunes soil is by the coast, and a freely draining loamy soil dominates the rest of the parish.

=== Beach and sand dunes ===
Since 1996, 1,396 hectares (3,450 acres) of the Drigg coast has been a designated Special Area of Conservation. The fixed sand dunes are categorised as a "priority feature". The small bar-built estuary is described as "one of the most natural and least developed in the UK, with little industry and few artificial coastal defence structures".

A 2007 survey found Drigg beach to be stoney at high tide from Carl Crag to Kokoarrah Scar and backed by sand dunes. The beach exposed at low tide was sand; with mud and sand at the lower foreshore. This area was frequented by both locals and holidaymakers. Barn Scar was found to be popular for collecting molluscs, whereas Kokoarrah Scar was normally inaccessible on foot as it was surrounded by seawater. From Kokoarrah Scar to Drigg Point the beach was sandy with patches of stones, and less used. Drigg Point marks the River Esk estuary. Since 2013 the coastline at Drigg has been designated a Marine Conservation Zone, as part of the Cumbria Coast. Kokoarrah rocky scar inter-tidal zone supports a variety of marine organisms. In 2018 following a shift in the level of sand a shipwreck was discovered on Kokoarrah beach. Floor plank timber from the wreck was British oak. Tree-ring dating showed the trees were felled after 1777 and the vessel was late 18th century or early 19th century.

The area of sand dunes at Drigg are annotated on early Ordnance Survey maps as Drigg Common, with a rabbit warren noted on the seaward edge.

=== Inland ===
Hallsenna Moor is a National Nature Reserve of lowland heath and peatland.

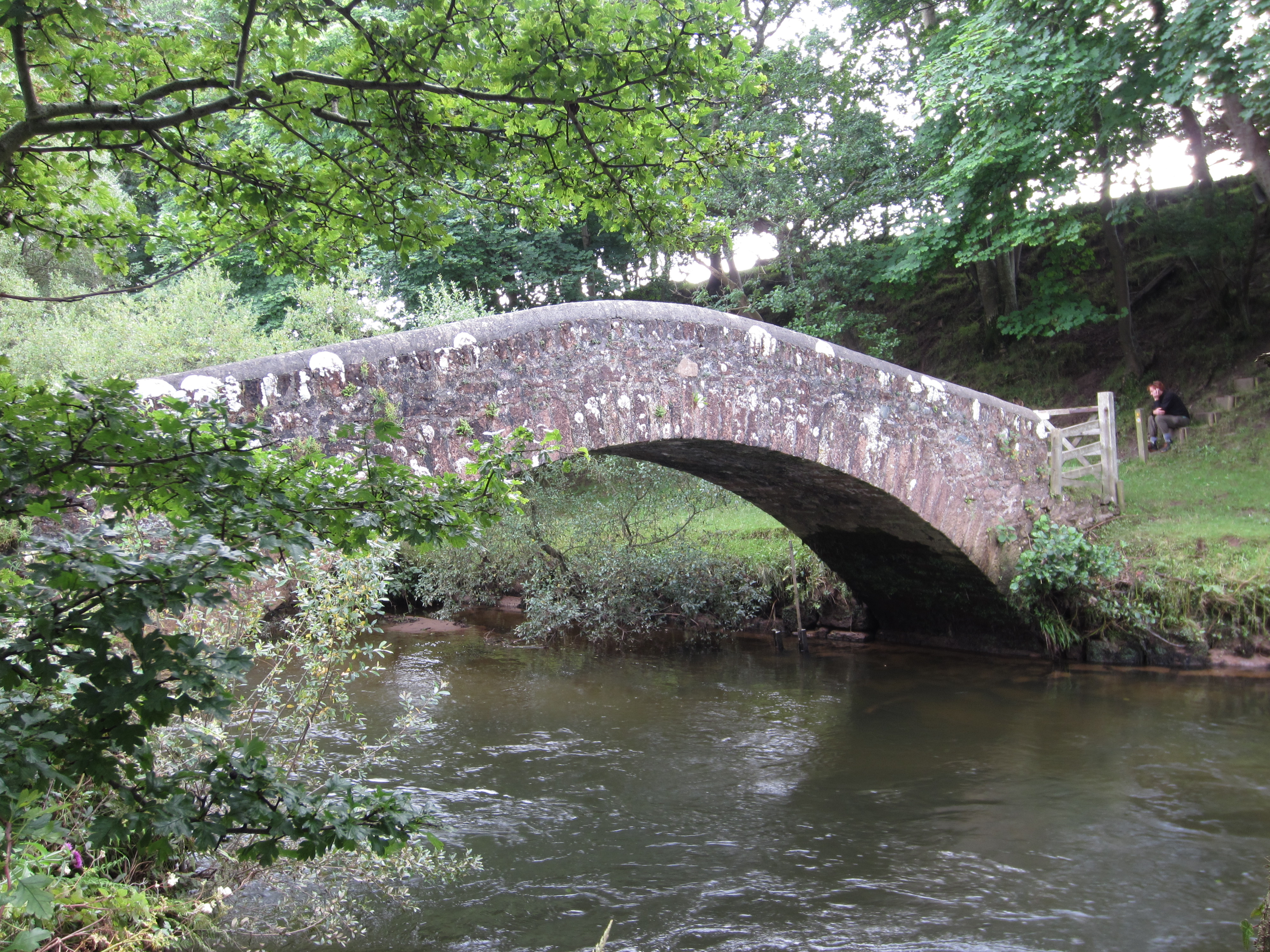
Drigg Holme Packhorse Bridge

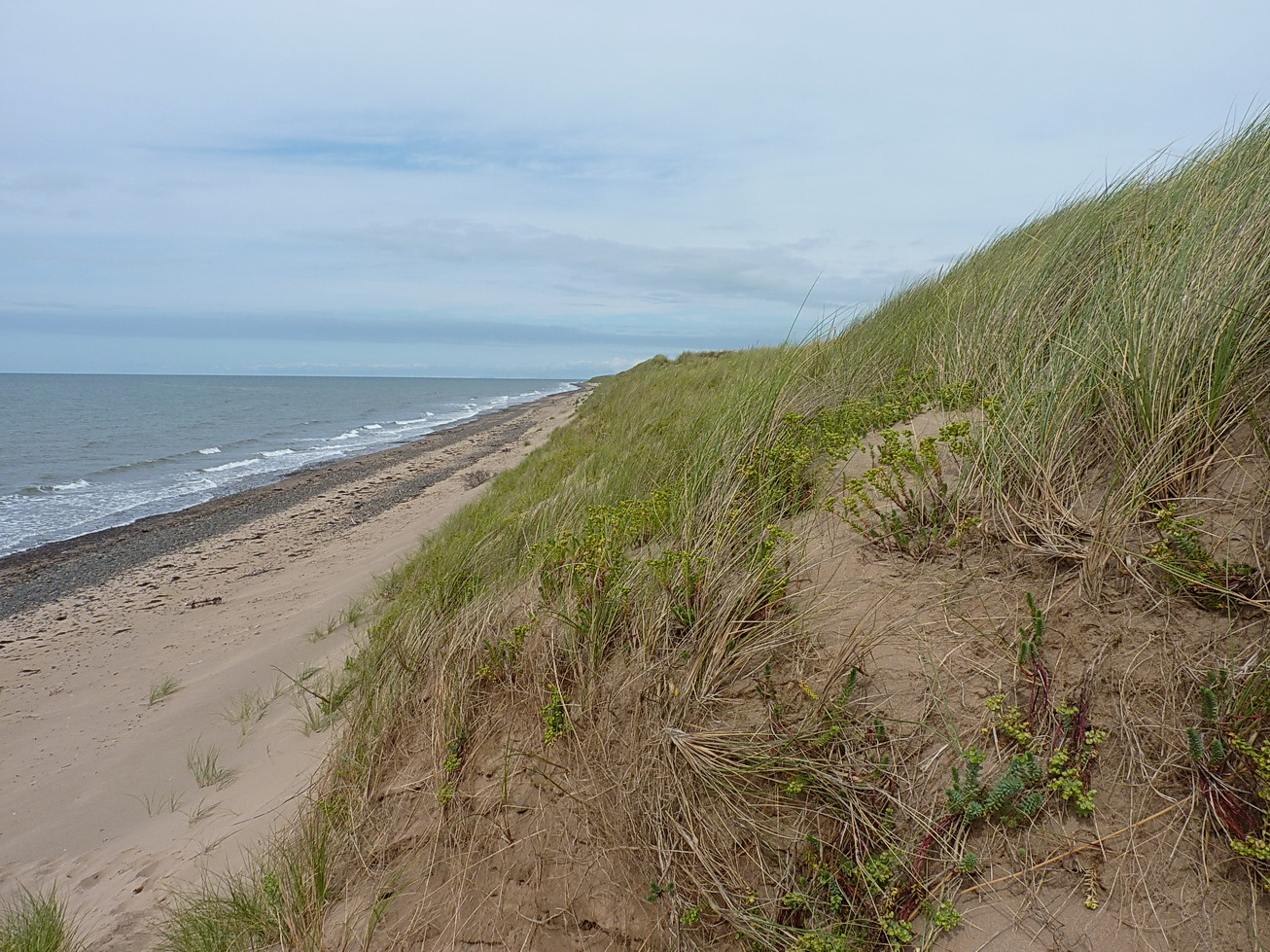
Dunes and beach near Drigg

== History ==
=== ROF Drigg ===
A Royal Ordnance Factory was established at Drigg in 1941. The site was chosen because the area was sparsely populated and to minimise the risk of German bombing. It was engaged in the production of Trinitrotoluene (TNT), reaching a weekly output of 400 tons. The factory was closed in 1945 following Victory over Japan day.

== Drigg and Carleton civil parish ==
The civil parish of Drigg and Carleton comprises the areas and settlements of Drigg, Stubble Green, Low Moor, Carleton, Saltcoats, Maudsyke, Wray Head, Hallsenna and Holmrook. Prior to the Local Government Act 1894 Carleton was a constablewick in the ancient parish of Drigg.

The civil parish population at the 2011 census was 449.

The parish council meets monthly in the village hall. Cumberland Council provides most local services. Drigg and Carleton is within the Cumberland unitary authority ward of Millom Without.

From the 2024 general election the parish is within the Whitehaven and Workington UK parliamentary constituency. It was previously within Copeland constituency.

Neighbouring parishes are Gosforth, Bootle, Seascale, Muncaster and Irton with Santon.

== Transport ==
=== Train ===
Drigg railway station is on the Cumbrian Coast Line. Southbound trains run to Barrow-in-Furness and northbound to Whitehaven, Workington and Carlisle. The Victoria Hotel stands in close proximity to the railway station; it was built soon after the railway arrived in 1849.

=== Bus ===
As of March 2026, 1 route operated by Stagecoach serves the village. The X7 to Millom or Whitehaven.

=== Road ===
The village of Drigg is on the B5344 road between Holmrook and Seascale, it links to the A595.

== Church ==
The parish church is dedicated to St Peter and was rebuilt in 1850.

== Low Level Waste Repository ==
The site of the Royal Ordnance Factory (ROF Drigg) between the railway line and the sea is now the site of the Nuclear Decommissioning Authority low-level radioactive waste repository. This was opened in 1959 by the United Kingdom Atomic Energy Authority, covers about 270 acres (110 ha), and holds about one million cubic metres of low level radioactive waste, although historic disposal records are incomplete. Much of the waste came from the nearby Sellafield nuclear complex.

== See also ==
- Listed buildings in Drigg and Carleton
