= Drigg railway station =

Railway station in Cumbria, England

Drigg
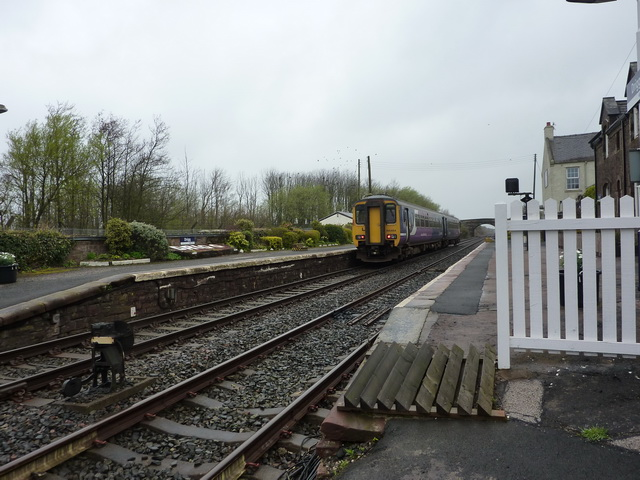

General information
- Location: Holmrook, Cumberland; England
- Coordinates: 54°22′37″N 3°26′37″W
- Grid reference: SD063988
- Owner: Network Rail
- Manager: Northern Trains
- Platforms: 2
- Tracks: 2

Other information
- Station code: DRI
- Classification: DfT category F2

History
- Original company: Whitehaven and Furness Junction Railway
- Pre-grouping: Furness Railway
- Post-grouping: London Midland and Scottish Railway; British Rail (London Midland Region)

Key dates
- 19 July 1849: Opened as Drigg for Wastwater
- 1955: Renamed Drigg

Passengers
- 2021/22: ▲5,540
- 2022/23: ▲6,258
- 2023/24: ▼5,448
- 2024/25: ▲7,076
- 2025/26: ▼6,698
Location
- Location within the former Borough of Copeland Location within Cumbria
Notes
- Passenger statistics from the Office of Rail and Road

Drigg is a railway station on the Cumbrian Coast Line, which runs between Carlisle and Barrow-in-Furness. The station, situated 31 miles (50 km) north-west of Barrow-in-Furness, serves the villages of Drigg and Holmrook in Cumbria. It is owned by Network Rail and managed by Northern Trains.

The station is unstaffed, but the main station building still stands and is in private commercial use as a cafe and craft shop.

At the south end of the station is a level crossing with manually operated gates, controlled from the adjacent signal box. There is step-free access to each platform, however the platforms are lower than the standard ones and are therefore not suitable for mobility-impaired passengers.

Waiting shelters and timetable posters are located on each side of the track, train running information for the station can also obtained by telephone. A ticket machine and digital information screens were installed by operator Northern in 2019, so passengers can now purchase tickets before boarding the train.

A short distance from the station, heavy secured sidings take special trains carrying nuclear materials from the Sellafield nuclear site (which is located close by) to the Low Level Waste Repository where the material is buried. Paul Merton visited the station en route to the Repository in the first episode of his 2016 travel documentary Paul Merton's Secret Stations.

== Services ==
There is an hourly service southbound to Barrow-in-Furness and northbound to Whitehaven, Workington and Carlisle for much of the day (with slightly longer gaps mid-morning and in the late afternoon). A few through trains continue south of Barrow-in-Furness along the Furness Line to Lancaster.

There is no service after 21:00 each evening, but a Sunday service was introduced with the May 2018 timetable change and is still in operation. Seven northbound and nine southbound trains call if required.

| Preceding station | National Rail | Following station |
|---|---|---|
| Seascale | Northern Trains; Cumbrian Coast Line | Ravenglass |
| | Historical railways | |
| Seascale | Whitehaven and Furness Junction Railway | Ravenglass |
