= Egremont Town Hall =

Municipal building in Egremont, Cumbria, England

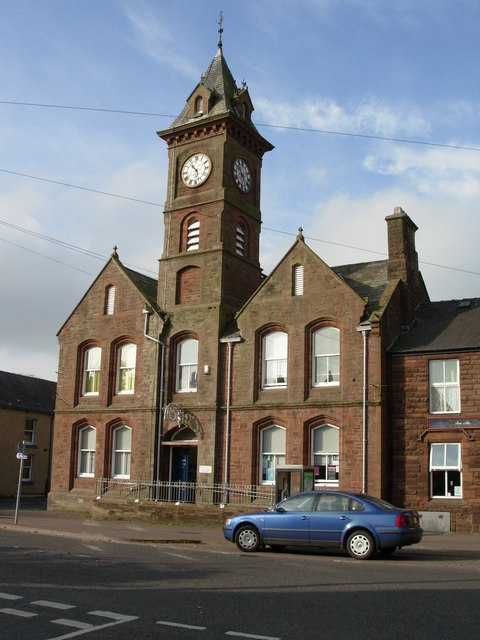
- Egremont Town Hall

- Shown in Cumbria
- 54.4836°N 3.5285°W
- Location: Main Street, Egremont

History
- Built: 1890

Site notes
- Architectural style: Gothic Revival style

Listed Building – Grade II
- Official name: Town Hall, Main Street
- Designated: 9 August 1984
- Reference no.: 1086707

Egremont Town Hall is a municipal building in Main Street, Egremont, Cumbria, England. The town hall, which is currently used as a public library, is a Grade II listed building.

== History ==
Following significant growth in the population, largely associated with the expansion of open-pit iron mining in the area, Egremont became a local government district with its own local board of health in 1879. In this context, the local board decided to commission a new market hall: the site they chose for the market hall was open land to the west of Main Street. The market hall was completed in 1883 and the local board followed this up, a few years later, with the procurement of a town hall on a site to the east of the market hall.

The new town hall was designed in the Gothic Revival style, built in fine sandstone at a cost of £5,000 and was completed in 1890. The design involved an asymmetrical main frontage with five bays facing onto Main Street; the central bay was formed by a five-stage clock tower with a doorway with a fanlight in the first stage, a segmental window in the second stage, a segmental niche in the third stage, a belfry in the fourth stage and a series of clock faces in the fifth stage: the tower was surmounted by a pyramid-shaped roof. The two outer bays on the left were surmounted with a gable, as were the two outer bays on the right: the outer bays were fenestrated by pointed windows on the ground floor and segmental windows on the first floor. Internally, the principal room was the office for the local board.

After the area became an urban district, with the town hall as its headquarters, in 1894, the new council designated some rooms for teaching and a new school was established in the building in 1895. The town hall ceased to be the local seat of government when the enlarged Ennerdale Rural District Council was formed at Cleator Moor in 1934. It was subsequently used as a venue for community events including theatre and cinema performances.

The declining use of the building caused Copeland District Council to market the building for sale in 2010. However, there was limited interest from purchasers and the building was withdrawn from sale, so that the local public library could relocate to the town hall later that year.

== See also ==
- Listed buildings in Egremont, Cumbria
