= Clints Quarry =

Nature reserve in Cumbria, England

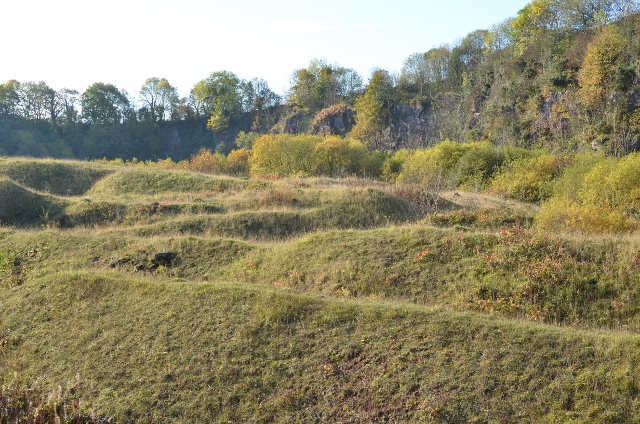

- Location within Cumbria
- Interactive map of Clints Quarry
- Location: Near Egremont, Cumbria
- OS grid: NY 008 124
- Coordinates: 54°29′49″N 3°31′59″W
- Area: 9 hectares (22 acres)
- Operator: Cumbria Wildlife Trust
- Designation: Site of Special Scientific Interest
- Website: www.cumbriawildlifetrust.org.uk/nature-reserves/clints-quarry

Clints Quarry is a nature reserve of the Cumbria Wildlife Trust, a former quarry about 1 mile (1.6 km) north of Egremont in Cumbria, England. Wildlife has become established since quarrying ceased in 1930.

== Background ==
The site, area 9 hectares (22 acres), was designated a Site of Special Scientific Interest in 1969.

Carboniferous limestone was quarried here in from the 1600s until 1930, and used for building and agriculture, and later for steelmaking. The site was purchased by the Trust from British Steel and Lord Egremont in 1984.

== Description ==
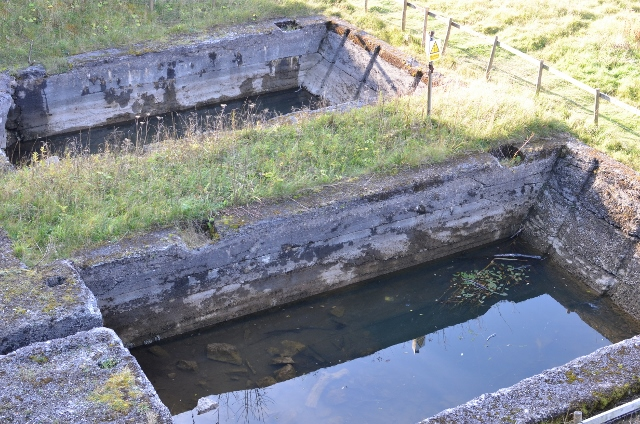
Concrete pools in the reserve

There is a circular walking trail, length 0.9 kilometres (0.6 mi); it curves around the edge of the quarry floor following old rail tracks. There are concrete pools remaining from past industrial activity.

Wildlife has become established since quarrying ceased. Spoil heaps on the quarry floor have become ridges that now have a wide range of wildlife in the dry conditions, including oxeye daisy, mouse-ear hawkweed, rough hawkbit, carline thistle and harebell. The damp conditions between spoilheaps have common spotted-orchid and the northern marsh orchid.

Butterfly species include common blue, orange tip and meadow brown. Frogs and toads breed in the ponds, and there are palmate newts and pond snails.

Management of the site includes controlling the spread of scrub and trees so that the grassland is preserved. The eastern part is wooded, mostly with ash and sycamore, and is a habitat for woodland birds.

== See also ==
- Geology of the Lake District
