= Haile Parish Church =

Coordinates: 54.465437°N 3.497351°W

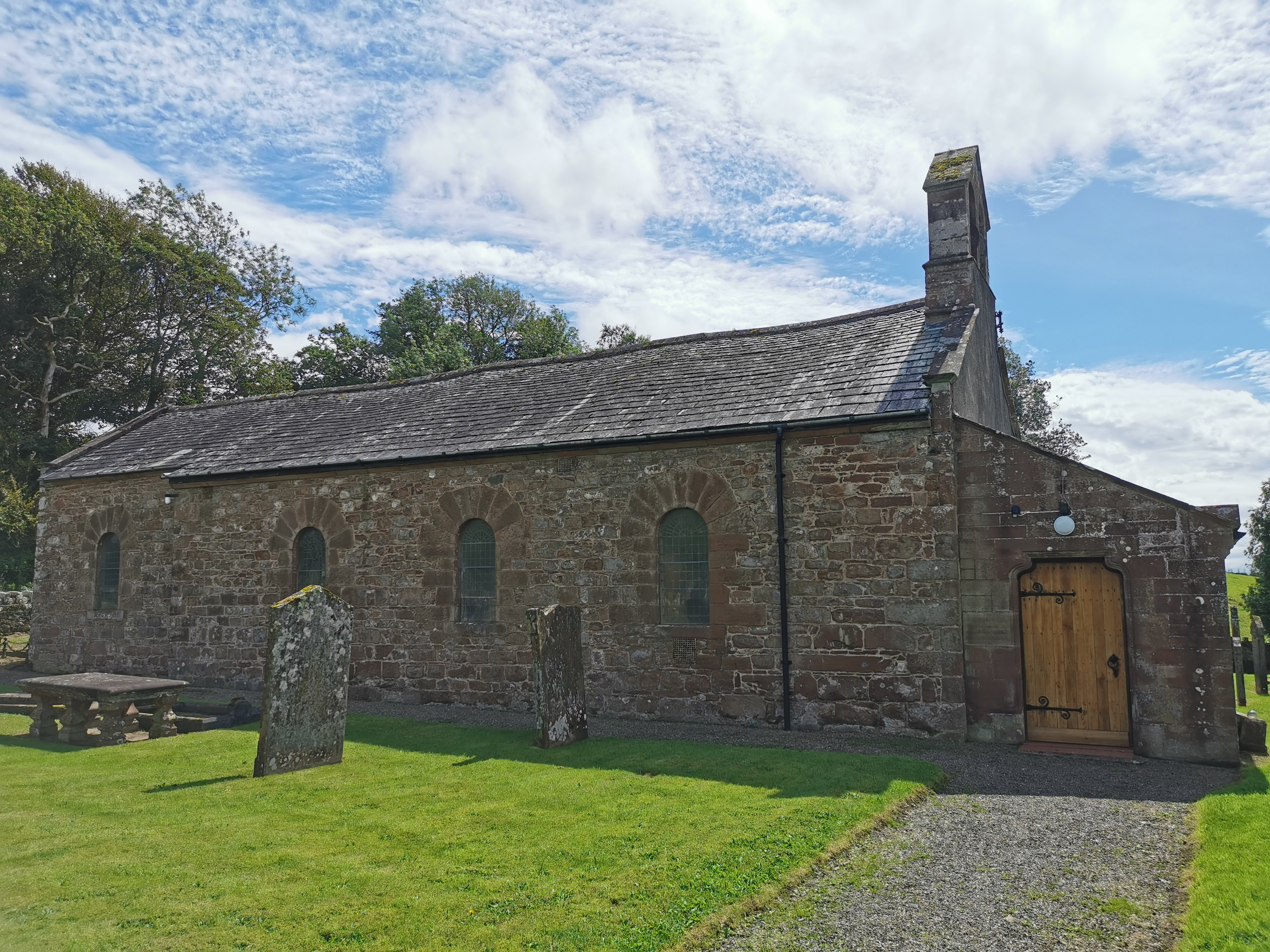
- Haile Parish Church

- Location in Cumbria
- OS grid reference: NY 0304608817
- Location: Haile, Cumbria
- Country: England
- Denomination: Anglican

History
- Status: Parish church
- Dedication: unknown

Administration
- Province: York
- Diocese: Carlisle
- Archdeaconry: West Cumberland
- Deanery: Calder
- Parish: Haile

Clergy
- Vicar: Rev'd Melanie Appleby

Haile Parish Church is near Haile, Cumbria, England. It is an active Anglican parish church in the deanery of Calder, and the diocese of Carlisle. Its benefice is Egremont with Bigrigg & Haile. The church is a Grade II listed building.

== History ==
Haile Parish Church, with no dedication, has Georgian plain arched windows, but the walls are medieval. The west porch was added by Ferguson in 1882, and the Church restoration took place mainly in 1883. a South-East quoin in the nave is part of an Anglo-Saxon cross-shaft, with scrolls. Outside against the West wall is a monument to John Ponsonby (1670).

== Architecture ==
Haile Parish Church is built of local red sandstone with white roughcast walls beneath a slate pitched roof. The church is 18th Century with earlier fragments, and a 19th Century porch believed to be by Charles John Ferguson, 1882. It has a single vessel nave and chancel with lean-to west porch. The 3-bay nave and narrower single-bay chancel have round-headed windows with large voussoirs and leaded glazing. It has plain cornice and coped gables with kneelers and an east gable cross and west gabled bellcote with 2 round-headed openings. The porch has 2 single-chamfered mullioned windows of 3 and 2 lights. The entrance to north has moulded reveals. Some 18th Century headstones to south wall, headstone to west wall, John Ponsonby (died 1678) has good naive inscription. Monument to John Ponsonby (1670) on the west outside wall. The inscription reads : "Learn Reader Under This Stone Doth Lye A Rare Example Cald John Ponsonbye If I Said Ylese I am Sur I Lyd He was a Faithful Freind And Soe He Dyd November 25 in the Year 1670". The south-east angle of nave has fragment of Anglo-Danish cross shaft as quoin. RIB 796 Altar dedicated to Hercules and Silvanus (a.d. 43-410)

The north window depicts Saint George and the Dragon by James Powell and Sons, a memorial to a later John Ponsonby, who died in 1952. The east window of the Crucifixion by Wailes and Strang and the south window depicts Saint Bega by Heaton, Butler and Bayne. Inside is a carved oak screen to the chancel. In a vault underneath this seat lie the remains of Miles Ponsonby esquire lord of the united manors of Hale and Wilton. The floor is diagonal basket weave wood. The pews are dark wood. There is a square terracotta font with cross engraved.

The church has no war graves.
