= West Lakes Academy =

Location
- Main Street; Egremont, Cumbria, CA22 2DQ; England; 54°29′04″N 3°31′46″W

Information
- Type: Academy
- Motto: Changing Lives Through Learning
- Established: 2008
- Local authority: Cumberland Council
- Department for Education URN: 135632 Tables
- Ofsted: Reports
- Chair: Claire Maxwell-Smith
- Principal: Stephen Grant
- Gender: Mixed
- Age: 11 to 18
- Enrolment: 1165
- Houses: Falcon, Longsdale, Ehen, Peel
- Colours: Blue, Red, Green, Yellow
- Website: http://www.westlakesacademy.org.uk

West Lakes Academy is a secondary school with a sixth form and sponsored academy status located in the town of Egremont in Cumbria, England. The academy is sponsored by Sellafield Ltd, the Nuclear Decommissioning Authority and the University of Central Lancashire.

The academy is a member of the West Lakes Multi-Academy Trust.

West Lakes Academy was formed in 2008 from the merger of Wyndham School, which was built and opened in the 1960s, with Ehenside School in Cleator Moor. West Lakes Academy opened on 1 September 2008. The academy is on the site of the old Wyndham School, and has been fully rebuilt, moving into the new buildings at Easter 2012.

== Senior Leadership ==
The Headteacher of West Lakes Academy is Mr Stephen Grant who was announced as the new headteacher in September 2024.The Assistant Headteacher is Mrs Karen Kellot who was announced alongside Mr Stephen Grant in September 2024

== New Building ==
In 2012 West Lakes Academy moved into a new £26 million building in Egremont. All classrooms face outwards from open learning areas on each of the three floors of the building. The academy focuses on education specialisms of technologies, science and performing arts.

Along with the new building came many new resources including computing resources which, together with the iPad program for all students supported by parental contributions, allows students of West Lakes Academy to express their creative learning.

== Ofsted ==
The academy was last inspected by Ofsted in June 2025 and was judged 'Inadequate'. Previously it was judged 'Outstanding' in March 2017, 'Good' in February 2013, and 'Satisfactory' in 2009.
