= Listed buildings in Egremont, Cumbria =

Egremont is a civil parish in the Cumberland district, Cumbria, England. It contains 26 buildings that are recorded in the National Heritage List for England. Of these, one is listed at Grade I, the highest of the three grades, and the others are at Grade II, the lowest grade. The parish contains the town of Egremont and the surrounding countryside. The oldest listed building is Egremont Castle; this and associated structures are listed. Most of the other listed buildings are houses and associated structures, farmhouses and farm buildings. The other listed buildings include churches, cemetery buildings, shops, two former toll houses, a milestone, a monument, a town hall, a drinking fountain, and two war memorials.

== Key ==
Grade	Criteria
I	Buildings of exceptional interest, sometimes considered to be internationally important
II	Buildings of national importance and special interest

== Buildings ==
Name and location	Photograph	Date	Notes	Grade
Egremont Castle; 54.47992°N 3.52942°W		12th century	A motte-and-bailey castle, now a ruin, it is built in sandstone blocks on a chamfered plinth. The surviving pasts include parts of the curtain wall with herring-bone decoration and embrasures, parts of the keep with its portcullis, and the gatehouse, with a round-headed arch and a segmental arch. The remains of the castle and its earthworks are also a scheduled monument.	I
Scalegill Hall and barn 54.51478°N 3.55252°W	—	17th century	The house is rendered and has a slate roof with stone coped gables. There are two storeys, three bays, and the house has a T-shaped plan. The doorway has an architrave and a cornice, and the windows are sashes in architraves. The barn is at right angles, in stone, and has quoins, a wagon door, two rows of ventilation slits, and a blocked mullioned window.	II
43 Main Street; 54.48167°N 3.52889°W	—	1662	Originally a house, later a shop, in pebbledashed stone with an angle pilaster on the right and a slate roof. There are two storeys and two bays. In the ground floor is a 19th-century shop front with a cornice and panelled pilasters, and above are sash windows in stone surrounds and a datestone.	II
Lowes Court; 54.48401°N 3.52800°W	—	Late 17th or early 18th century	Originally a house, later a shop, it is roughcast on a plinth, with a pilaster at the left end and a Welsh slate roof. There are two storeys and three bays. To the left is a door in a stone surround, in the centre is a large shop window, and at the right is a wagon arch with a moulded elliptical head and flanked by columns.	II
59–60 Main Street; 54.48245°N 3.52866°W		18th century	A house and a cottage, both in rendered stone and with slate roofs that have coped gables. No. 59 has three storeys and five bays. In the centre is a Tudor arched porch with angle buttresses and a doorway with a chamfered surround. The windows are mullioned and transomed, those in the ground floor with cornices. No. 60 to the right, originally two cottages, has two storeys and three bays. The windows are mullioned with sashes.	II
Sundial; 54.47967°N 3.53014°W	—	1762	The sundial is in the grounds of Egremont Castle. It is set on a square plinth, and consists of an inscribed stone drum surmounted by a stone block with a tapering octagonal finial. The sides of the block are each incised with a vertical sundial grid. The gnomons are missing.	II
57 Main Street; 54.48227°N 3.52871°W	—	Late 18th to early 19th century	A pebbledashed house with a slate roof, in two storeys and four bays. Steps with wrought iron handrails lead up to the doorway. To the right is a garage door, and the windows are sashes.	II
Croft End House, walls, gate piers, and railings 54.50227°N 3.52905°W	—	Early to mid 19th century	A stuccoed stone house with angle pilasters, an eaves cornice, and a slate roof with coped gables. There are two storeys and three bays. In the centre is a Doric porch, with a single-light sash window above, and three-light sash windows in both floors in the outer bays. In front of the house are rubble walls with quoins and chamfered coping about 3 feet (0.91 m) high. They contain square, rusticated gate piers on plinth blocks with corniced caps and ogee finials. On the walls are wrought iron spearheaded railings.	II
54–56 Main Street; 54.48219°N 3.52872°W	—	Mid 19th century	Two stuccoed houses and a cottage. No. 54 is on the left, and has a slate roof, two storeys, and two bays. Nos. 55 and 56 have a plinth, rusticated quoins, a cornice, and a tiled roof. There are three storeys and five bays, and on the front is a paired Tuscan porch. The windows in all the houses are sashes.	II
Milestone; 54.50090°N 3.53937°W	—	Mid 19th century	The milestone is in sandstone, and consists of a square block about 2 feet (0.61 m) high with a chamfered top set diagonally to the road. On the south face is a rectangular cast iron plate showing the distances in miles to Whitehaven. The plate from the north face is missing.	II
Garden walls, Scalegill Hall; 54.51456°N 3.55251°W	—	19th century (probable)	The walls are on the south and west sides of the garden. They are in rubble on a tapering plinth, and have flat coping and corner pilasters. They are between 8 feet (2.4 m) and 10 feet (3.0 m) high, and are ramped to the northeast and southwest.	II
17 Bridge End; 54.47864°N 3.52510°W	—	1851	Originally a toll house, later a private house, it is stuccoed on a chamfered plinth, and has a slate roof with coped gables and finials. It has a cruciform plan and is in a single storey. On the front, to the left, is a gabled porch with a chamfered surround and a four-centred arched head. To the right is a canted bay window with a cornice.	II
Toll Bar House; 54.48942°N 3.53308°W	—	1856	Originally a toll house, later a private house, it is stuccoed, and has a slate roof with coped gables and finials. The house has a single storey, and on the front, to the left, is a gabled porch with a chamfered surround and a four-centred arched head. To the right is a canted bay window with a cornice, and on the right return is a three-light window. All the windows are 20th-century replacements, retaining original chamfered surrounds and mullions.	II
Cemetery entrance 54.48895°N 3.53178°W	—	1864	At the entrance to the cemetery is a stone lodge on a chamfered plinth, with quoins, and a slate roof with coped gables and finials. It has two storeys and three bays, a gabled porch, and sash windows. There is a wall, about 7 feet (2.1 m) high, with moulded coping, square gate piers, about 10 feet (3.0 m) high, with a moulded plinth and a corniced cap, and cast iron gates.	II
Eastern cemetery chapel 54.48939°N 3.53115°W	—	c. 1864	The chapel is in stone on a chamfered plinth, with buttresses, and a slate roof with coped gables. It has a cruciform plan. There are doorways with porches on the north and south sides, the south porch has polished granite columns with foliated capitals. At the south end is a gabled bellcote.	II
Western cemetery chapel 54.48955°N 3.53178°W	—	c. 1864	The chapel is in stone on a chamfered plinth, with buttresses, and a slate roof with coped gables. It has a cruciform plan. There are doorways with porches on the north and south sides, the south porch has polished granite columns with foliated capitals. At the south end is a gabled bellcote.	II
58 Main Street; 54.48236°N 3.52869°W	—	Mid to late 19th century	A bank in rendered stone, with a string course, an eaves cornice, and a slate roof with coped gables. There are two storeys with an attic, and two bays. The entrance is in the left bay, with a passage door to the left, and in the right bay is a canted bay window. There are sash windows in the upper floor, above which are dormers with segmental heads containing casement windows.	II
Monument to Joseph Roberts; 54.48936°N 3.53151°W	—	1866	The monument, between the cemetery chapels, commemorates a local benefactor. It is in stone, in Decorated Gothic style, and is about 10 feet (3.0 m) high. The monument consists of a plinth on two steps, and has clustered shafts with foliate capitals. The top is gabled with crockets and apex crosses, and is surmounted by an octagon and a tapered finial.	II
Gates, walls and railings, Church of St Mary and St Michael; 54.48075°N 3.52840°W	—	Late 19th century	The gate posts are square, in cast iron, about 8 feet (2.4 m) high, with Gothic panelling and pyramidal caps. The gates are in cast and wrought iron, and are decorated with fleur-de-lis, ogee arcading, and scrollwork. The railings stand on rubble walls with chamfered copings.	II
St John's Church; 54.50966°N 3.54929°W	—	1877–80	The church was designed by C. J. Ferguson in Decorated Gothic style, and was extended in 1993. It is a small church in sandstone and has green slate roofs. The church consists of a nave with a porch, and a chancel, with an extension at the southwest. On the south gable is a pilaster buttress and a single bellcote.	II
Church of St Mary and St Michael; 54.48076°N 3.52752°W		1881–83	The church was built on the site of a 12th-century church, and fabric from that church was incorporated, namely four windows and a sedilia. The baptistry was added in 1886 and the tower was raised in 1901–02. The church is in Early English style, and built in sandstone on a moulded plinth. It has quoins, string courses, pilaster buttresses, an eaves cornice, and slate roofs with coped gables and apex crosses. The church consists of a semicircular west baptistry, a nave with a clerestory, aisles, transepts, a chancel, and a northwest tower. The tower has four stages, a doorway with a pointed arch, and an embattled parapet.	II
1 Market Street; 54.48353°N 3.52864°W	—	c. 1889–90	A stone house attached to the Town Hall, it has quoins and a slate roof. There are two storeys and two bays. The house has a door with a fanlight and a segmental head. The windows are sashes, also with segmental heads.	II
Town Hall; 54.48359°N 3.52849°W		1889–90	The town hall is in stone on a chamfered plinth, with quoins and string courses, and slate roofs with coped gables and finials. There are five bays. The central bay comprises a five-stage clock tower which contains a doorway with a four-centred arch and a fanlight, segmental-headed openings, and a pyramidal roof with gablets and a weathervane. The outer bays are gabled, they have two storeys, and segmental-headed sash windows.	II
Drinking fountain and water trough 54.48024°N 3.53081°W	—	1904	The drinking fountain and water trough stand opposite the entrance to the castle grounds, and are in polished grey and pink granite. The fountain stands on three steps and has a square plinth, bowls on three faces, and corner shafts on consoles. At the top is a cornice and a fluted dome with a ball finial. The water trough is to the left.	II
Moor Row and Scalegill War Memorial; 54.48114°N 3.52881°W	—	1921	The war memorial stands at a road junction, and is in Aberdeen granite. It consists of an elaborate Celtic cross on a square plinth and a two-stepped base. The shaft has a wreath carved in relief, and it has an elaborate foot incorporating carved pediments and shields. On the front of the lower step are rifles carved in relief. The plinth carries an inscription and the names of those lost in the First World War, and there is another inscription on the upper step. On the left side is a tablet with an inscription and the names of those lost in the Second World War.	II
Egremont war memorial and railings 54.51365°N 3.53900°W	—	1922	The war memorial consists of a square granite plinth with inscriptions, about 6 feet (1.8 m) high, on two steps. Standing on the plinth is life-size figure in bronze of a soldier leaning on a rifle. The memorial is surrounded by an oval enclosure of wrought iron railings, with a gate on the north side.	II
