= Holmrook =

Village in Cumbria, England

Coordinates: 54.383°N 3.420°W

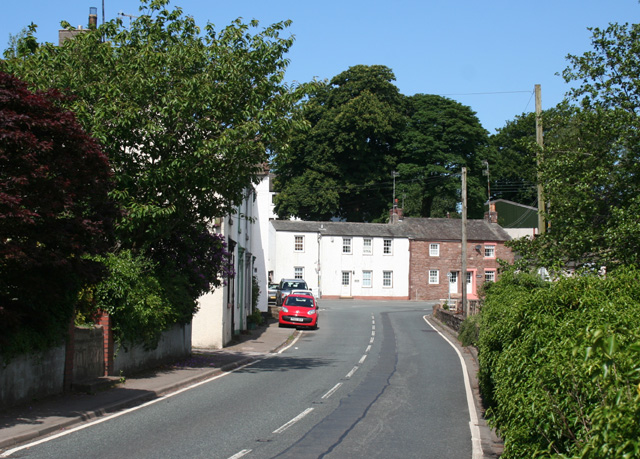
- Cottages by the A595 at Holmrook

- Location in Copeland Borough Location within Cumbria
- OS grid reference: SD077995
- Civil parish: Drigg and Carleton; Irton with Santon
- Unitary authority: Cumberland
- Ceremonial county: Cumbria
- Region: North West
- Country: England
- Sovereign state: United Kingdom
- Post town: HOLMROOK
- Postcode district: CA19
- Dialling code: 019467
- Police: Cumbria
- Fire: Cumbria
- Ambulance: North West
- UK Parliament: Whitehaven and Workington

Holmrook is a linear village in the English county of Cumbria. It lies along the A595 road on the west banks of the River Irt. The B5344 road connects it to Drigg, with its railway station less than two miles to the west.

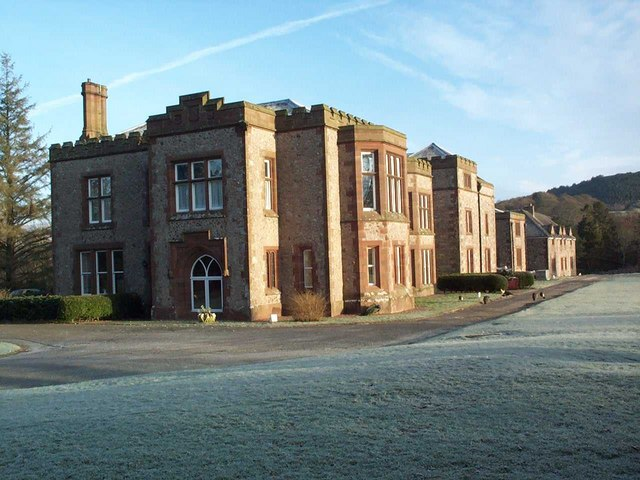
Irton Hall

Two miles north-east along the Irt valley is Irton Hall, a large mostly 19th-century house which incorporates a 14th-century pele tower.

== Holmrook Hall ==
Holmrook Hall was a Victorian country house, at one time owned by the Reverend Charles Skeffington Lutwidge. His relative Charles Lutwidge Dodgson - better known as the author, mathematician and photographer Lewis Carroll - used to come and stay occasionally.

During World War II, Holmrook Hall was requisitioned by the Admiralty on behalf of the Royal Navy, with locals told that it was a rest home for shipwrecked and distressed sailors. In fact, strategically located between ROF Drigg and ROF Sellafield, it was the Royal Navy bomb and munitions training school between 1943 and 1946, under the title HMS Volcano. Designated a Top Secret site, it trained Royal Navy personnel, the Special Boat Service and Norwegian expatriates in the wartime use of explosives and demolition. Among the graduates of HMS Volcano were:

- Noel Cashford MBE
- Lionel "Buster" Crabb OBE

After the war, the hall fell into disrepair and was demolished. Only the stable block remains, and has been converted to housing.
