= Seascale railway station =

Railway station in Cumbria, England

Seascale
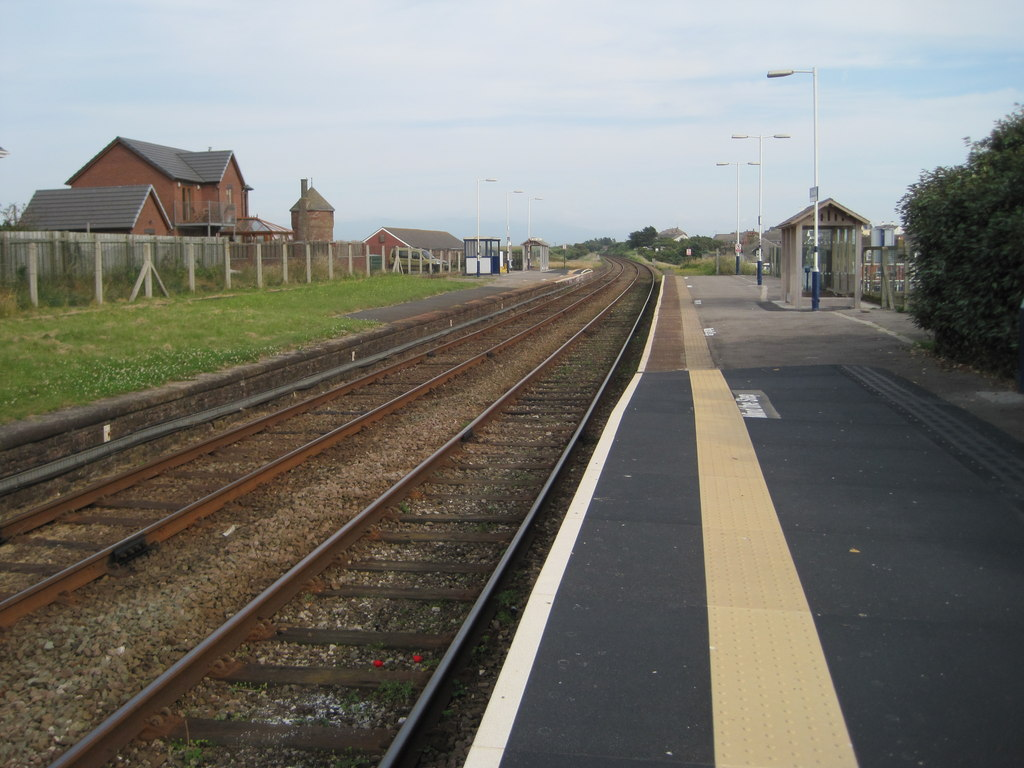

General information
- Location: Seascale, Cumberland; England
- Coordinates: 54°23′47″N 3°29′07″W
- Grid reference: NY036011
- Owner: Network Rail
- Manager: Northern Trains
- Platforms: 2
- Tracks: 2

Other information
- Station code: SSC
- Classification: DfT category F2

History
- Original company: Whitehaven and Furness Junction Railway
- Pre-grouping: Furness Railway
- Post-grouping: London Midland and Scottish Railway; British Rail (London Midland Region)

Key dates
- 19 July 1849: Opened as Seascale for Gosforth
- 1866: Renamed Seascale for Gosforth and Wastwater
- 1955: Renamed Seascale

Passengers
- 2021/22: ▲37,728
- 2022/23: ▲43,038
- 2023/24: ▲44,096
- 2024/25: ▲48,928
- 2025/26: ▼41,176
Location
- Location within the former Borough of Copeland Location within Cumbria
Notes
- Passenger statistics from the Office of Rail and Road

Seascale is a railway station on the Cumbrian Coast Line, which runs between Carlisle and Barrow-in-Furness. The station, situated 33 1/4 miles (54 km) north-west of Barrow-in-Furness, serves the village of Seascale in Cumbria. It is owned by Network Rail and managed by Northern Trains.

== History ==
The station was opened on 19 July 1849 as Seascale for Gosforth when the Whitehaven and Furness Junction Railway opened the line between Whitehaven Newtown and Ravenglass. (Note: There is some confusion over the actual date of opening the station, Quick (2022) reports that it is likely the formal opening was on the 18 July and that regular passenger trains began on 19 July, this is supported by local newspapers, the one cited giving a full account on page 4 and a summary with details of times and fares on page 1.)

Originally the station had one platform on the inland side of a passing loop in the otherwise single track railway, there was a single siding with a crane and a small building.

The station was renamed in 1866 to Seascale for Gosforth and Wastwater, although there are instances of the older, shorter, name being used in some publications. By 1899 the line had been doubled and the station had two main platforms and a bay, the station building was larger, there was a goods yard to the south east able to accommodate most types of goods including live stock and was equipped with a three-ton crane.

At least one camping coach was positioned here by the London Midland Region from 1955 to 1971, from 1964 to 1969 there were two, including two Pullman type coaches in 1967 only. The station was renamed in 1955 to Seascale.

== Facilities ==
There are train shelters, passenger information displays and seating on each side but the station is not staffed (though it is one of the few mandatory stops on the route); a ticket machine has now been installed by Northern to allow passengers to buy before boarding the train. Access to the platforms is step-free on both sides, but the low platforms make the station unsuitable for mobility-impaired users without assistance (a Harrington Hump has been installed here to improve accessibility).

The views are of St Bees Head and across the Solway Firth towards southern Scotland (to the north), Seascale village (to the east and south) and the Isle of Man (to the west).

== Services ==
Since the May 2018 timetable change, a basic hourly service (with some shorter intervals) runs through the day until mid-evening. A Sunday service also now operates (seven northbound, nine southbound) - the first time such a service has run since May 1976.

== Notes ==
| Preceding station | National Rail | Following station |
|---|---|---|
| Sellafield | Northern Trains; Cumbrian Coast Line | Drigg |
| | Historical railways | |
| Sellafield | Whitehaven and Furness Junction Railway | Drigg |
