= Sellafield railway station =

Railway station in Cumbria, England

Sellafield
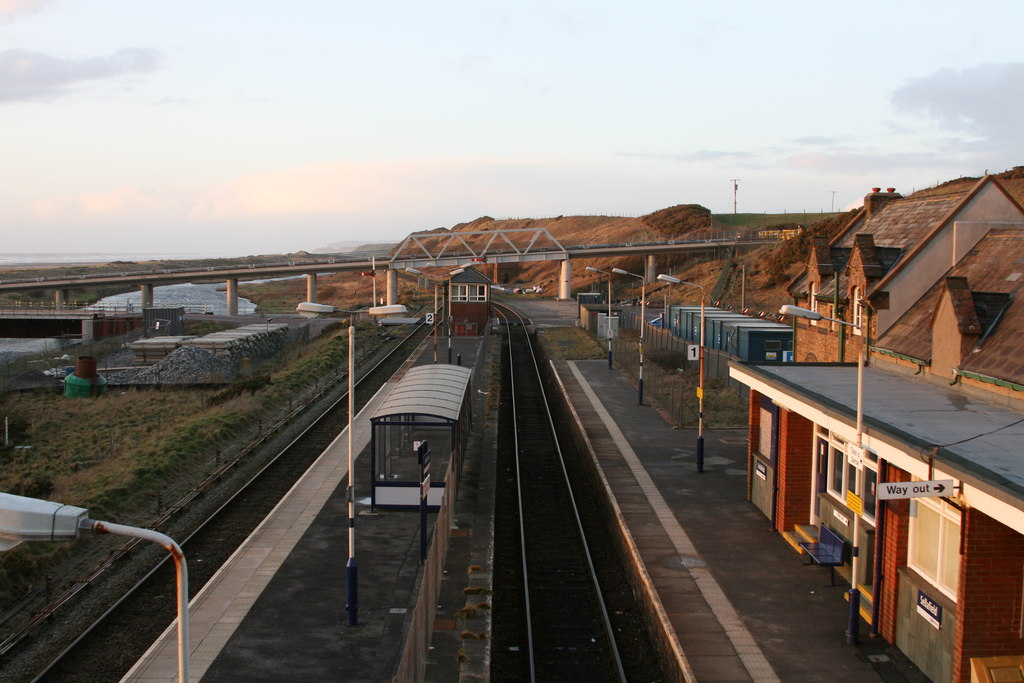

General information
- Location: Sellafield, Cumberland; England
- Coordinates: 54°25′00″N 3°30′38″W
- Grid reference: NY020034
- Owner: Network Rail
- Manager: Northern Trains
- Platforms: 2
- Tracks: 2

Other information
- Station code: SEL
- Classification: DfT category F1

History
- Original company: Whitehaven and Furness Junction Railway
- Pre-grouping: Furness Railway
- Post-grouping: London, Midland and Scottish Railway; British Rail (London Midland Region)

Key dates
- 1850: Opened as Sellafield and Calderbridge
- 1955: Renamed Sellafield

Passengers
- 2021/22: ▲0.130 million
- Interchange: ▲142
- 2022/23: ▲0.137 million
- Interchange: ▼126
- 2023/24: ▲0.145 million
- Interchange: ▲151
- 2024/25: ▲0.187 million
- Interchange: ▲168
- 2025/26: ▼0.136 million
- Interchange: ▼88
Location
- Location within the former Borough of Copeland Location within Cumbria
Notes
- Passenger statistics from the Office of Rail and Road

Sellafield is a railway station on the Cumbrian Coast Line, which runs between Carlisle and Barrow-in-Furness. It serves Sellafield, in Cumbria, England; it is situated 35 miles (56 km) north-west of Barrow-in-Furness. The station is owned by Network Rail and managed by Northern Trains.

== History ==
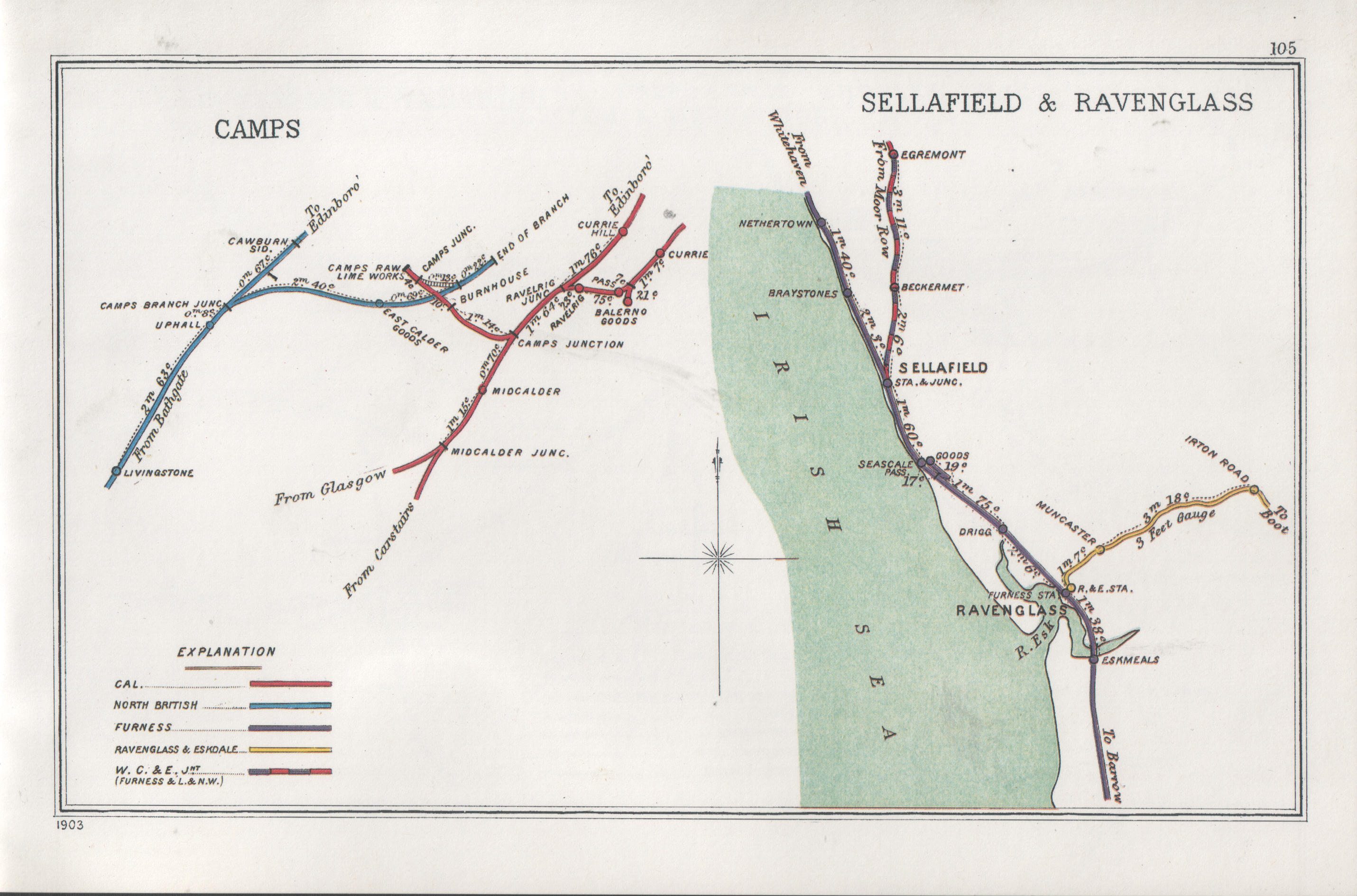
A 1903 Railway Clearing House junction diagram, showing railways in the vicinity of Sellafield to the right

The station, which dates from 1850, is a busy freight location; this is because much of the nuclear waste for Sellafield's THORP nuclear fuel reprocessing plant is carried there by train from the docks in Barrow-in-Furness or from rail-connected nuclear power stations elsewhere in the UK. The facility also generates significant commuter traffic for the railway, with workers travelling by train from nearby towns and villages.

The station is at the end of the single-line section from Whitehaven, which is operated using the electric key token system. From there, the line south towards Ravenglass and Barrow is double tracked, except for the final section between Park South Junction (south of Askam) and Barrow, which was reduced to a single track in the late 1980s.

The station used to be the southern terminus of the former Whitehaven, Cleator and Egremont Railway line from Egremont, from August 1869 until the line's closure in March 1964.

== Layout ==
The station configuration is unusual in that the southbound ('up' line) is bi-directional through the station and has platform faces on both sides. However, only the eastern platform face is used, with the other side being fenced off. This allows trains from the south to terminate and turn back without having to enter the single-line section to St Bees.

The signal box controlling the layout is located at the north end of the station, whilst the exchange sidings for the plant and the locomotive depot used by Direct Rail Services' freight trains are to the south. There are two water cranes at the station, one at each end.

== Facilities ==
The station is not staffed, but there is now a ticket machine in the main building for passengers to buy tickets prior to travel. There is a waiting room on the southbound platform and a shelter on the opposite side; the other main buildings are in private commercial use and there are no facilities for car parking. The platforms are linked by a footbridge which does not include ramps, so only the Barrow platform has step-free access. Train running information is provided by digital information screens, timetable posters and telephone.

== Services ==
There is a basic hourly service (with a few variations) in each direction between Barrow-in-Furness and Carlisle. Certain southbound trains continue to Lancaster, with one service from the south terminating and turning back at Sellafield on weekdays only.

In November 2011, it was reported that Direct Rail Services (DRS) had applied to the Office of Rail Regulation to operate one train in each direction between Carlisle and Sellafield to carry workers to the nuclear facility. Between May 2015 and December 2018, four trains per day each way ran to provide additional seating capacity for workers at the Sellafield plant, using Mark 2 coaches and Class 37 diesel locomotives hired in from DRS.

Preceding station	National Rail	Following station
Braystones	Northern Trains; Cumbrian Coast Line	Seascale
	Historical railways	
Braystones	Whitehaven and Furness Junction Railway	Seascale
