= Egremont, Cumbria =

Town and civil parish in Cumbria, England

Coordinates: 54.4840°N 3.5306°W

Egremont
- Town and parish
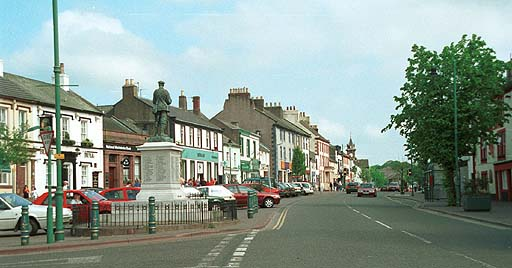
- Main Street, Egremont

- Location within Cumbria
- Population: 7,735 (Parish, 2021); 5,795 (Built up area, 2021)
- OS grid reference: NY008109
- Civil parish: Egremont
- Unitary authority: Cumberland
- Ceremonial county: Cumbria
- Region: North West
- Country: England
- Sovereign state: United Kingdom
- Post town: EGREMONT
- Postcode district: CA22
- Dialling code: 01946
- Police: Cumbria
- Fire: Cumbria
- Ambulance: North West
- UK Parliament: Whitehaven and Workington

Egremont /ˈɛɡrəmənt/ is a market town and civil parish in the Cumberland district of Cumbria, England. It is situated just outside the Lake District National Park, five miles (eight kilometres) south of Whitehaven and on the River Ehen. The parish also includes the villages of Bigrigg and Moor Row.

The town lies at the foot of the Uldale valley and Dent Fell. It has a long industrial heritage including dyeing, weaving and iron ore mining. The modern economy is based around the nuclear industry at nearby Sellafield.

Egremont Castle was built in the 12th century on the site of an earlier fortification. The castle ruins stand at the southern end of Main Street, near where the street widens out to serve as the market place. Egremont was granted a charter for a market and annual fair by Henry III around 1266. The fair continues as the Crab Fair, which now hosts the World Gurning Championships.

== History ==
=== Toponymy ===
The name Egremont derives from the Old French aigremont meaning 'pointed hill'.

=== The Barony of Copeland (or Egremont) ===
Egremont pre-dates the Norman conquest. The Danes first established a fort on the site of Egremont Castle around the end of the first millennium AD.

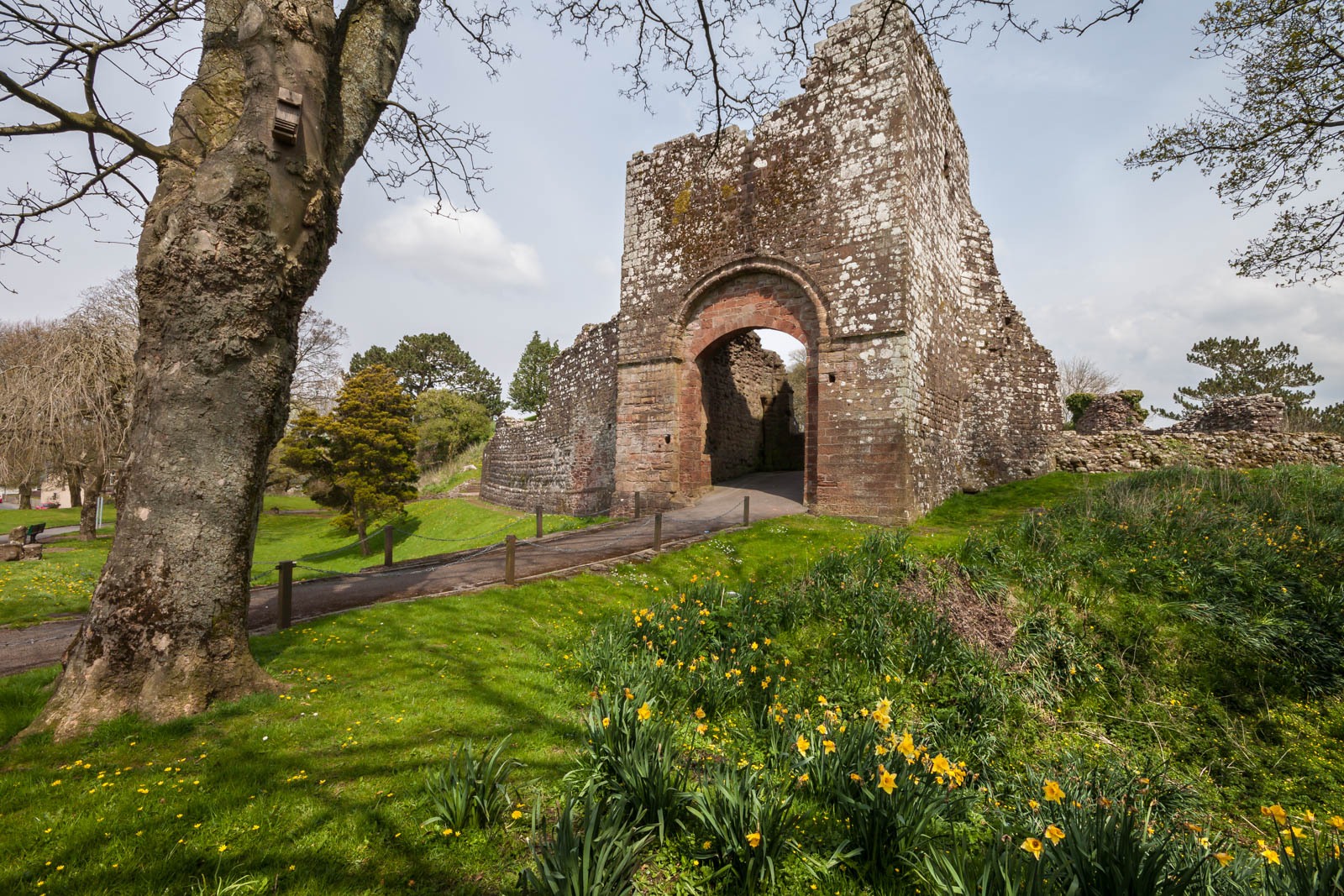
Ruins of Egremont Castle

When William Rufus extended Norman rule into Cumbria in around 1092, control of the area was given to Ivo Taillebois, who was married to Lucy of Bolingbroke, heiress of extensive lands in Lincolnshire. When Ivo died in 1094, this authority passed to Lucy's second husband Roger fitz Gerold de Roumare, who survived for only two more years, then to her third husband Ranulph le Meschines. On his becoming the Earl of Chester, his estates were returned to the Crown towards paying for the earldom. Around 1120, Henry I gave the Barony of Copeland to Ranulph's son William who made his home at Egremont and began to build the castle, which took approximately 150 years to complete. The Barony was inherited by William's son Ranulph. With Ranulph having no male heir, the barony passed to his sister Alice, who married the Scottish prince, William Fitz Duncan; they had a child who, after his death, became known as "the Boy of Egremont"; again, with no living male heir, William Fitz Duncan's estates passed to his three daughters Annabel, Cecily and Alice.

The estates passed down to Annabel's son Richard de Lucy. Richard's two daughters married two brothers of the de Multon family, Alice (now called de Morville) married Alan de Multon and Annabel (also now called de Morville) married Lambert de Multon. Annabel and Lambert de Multon inherited the Barony of Copeland and again, the castle had a lord in residence.

Around 1205, the tale of Grunwilda was told; she was the wife of Richard de Lucy and was killed by a wolf on a hunting trip; this tale is recounted in the poem "The Woeful Chase". Again leaving no male heir, Richard died and the superstition began that no male heir should inherit Egremont Castle because of the conduct of the forefathers. Egremont was granted a market charter by Henry III in 1266 or 1267, with the right to hold a weekly market and an annual fair.

When the last male Multon died in 1335, one of the co-heiresses married Thomas Lucy, grandson of Thomas Multon. Anthony, the last Lord Lucy, died in 1369, and the lands passed to his brother-in-law Henry Percy, 1st Earl of Northumberland, staying with the Percy family and its successors ever since. The present lord is Max Wyndham, 2nd Baron Egremont and 7th Baron Leconfield, who lives in the family home, one of the earliest Percy possessions: Petworth House in West Sussex. The dowager Lady Egremont, Pamela, lived at Cockermouth Castle until her death in 2013.

=== The town ===
In 1322, Robert the Bruce attacked the town, causing a huge death toll. For the next 100 years or so an uneasy peace followed and the castle fell into ruins.

In 1565, a stone bridge was built over the River Ehen to access the town, which was now smaller because of frequent Scottish raids. Little changed for a century, until new stone buildings appeared on the Main Street, probably built with stone from the castle. In 1683, Edward Benn and his heirs were given land with the provision that they rebuild the stone bridge and maintain it for ever.

In 1748, another bridge was built at Briscoe Mill at a cost of £28-15s-0d (£28.75), paid for by John Pearson, a local hatter. Soon Egremont began to service the Port of Whitehaven and in 1830, iron ore was mined over several sites.

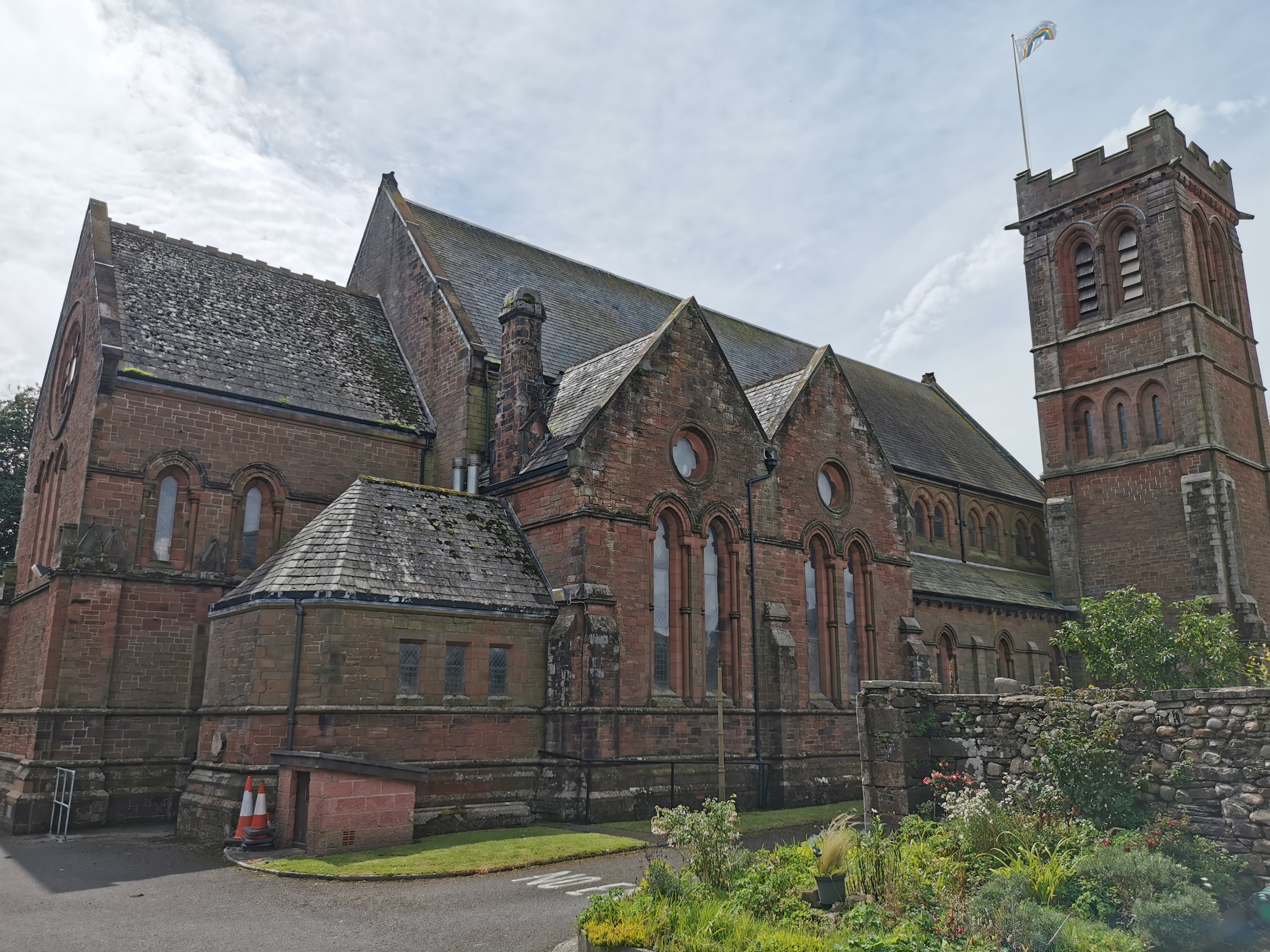
St Mary and St Michael's Church

Over the next 60 years new schools and churches were built. The town's Anglican parish church of St Mary and St Michael was rebuilt in 1881, retaining some fabric from the previous church building which had stood on the site since the 12th century.

New housing estates were also built to accommodate the growing town, with many old parts of the town being demolished in 1968.

In 1964, Wyndham School was built, an early comprehensive school. In 1970, there was a large increase in workers moving into the town to work on the new nuclear site.

In 1990, the Egremont by-pass was opened.

On 2 June 2010, the town was the scene of some of the Cumbria shootings. Derrick Bird, a 52-year-old local taxi driver, shot and killed twelve people, two of them in Egremont, before committing suicide.

=== Industrial history ===
Historically, dyeing and weaving were traditional local industries based around the River Ehen. Iron ore mining and quarrying has been established in Egremont for more than 800 years. Industrial mining of iron ore started around 1830 with many mines being opened, and ended when the Florence Mine closed in 2007.

Around the early 17th century, agricultural lime was mined at Clints Quarry, with more heavy duty mining being undertaken to supply the iron and ore industry in the mid 19th century, finally ending in 1930. Clints Quarry (now a Site of Special Scientific Interest) can be found just north of Egremont town.

In 1950, Rowntrees built a chocolate crumb factory near Christie Bridge and the nuclear industry became established at Sellafield. The Rowntrees site has become a new housing estate, York Place, which is located at the northern end of Main Street.

== Governance ==
There are two tiers of local government covering Egremont, at civil parish (town) and unitary authority level: Egremont Town Council and Cumberland Council. The town council meets and has its offices at the Market Hall on Market Street. For national elections, Egremont forms part of the Whitehaven and Workington constituency.

=== Administrative history ===
Egremont was an ancient parish in the historic county of Cumberland. In 1879, the parish was made a local government district, administered by an elected local board. Egremont Town Hall was completed in 1890 to serve as the board's headquarters. Local government districts were reconstituted as urban districts under the Local Government Act 1894.

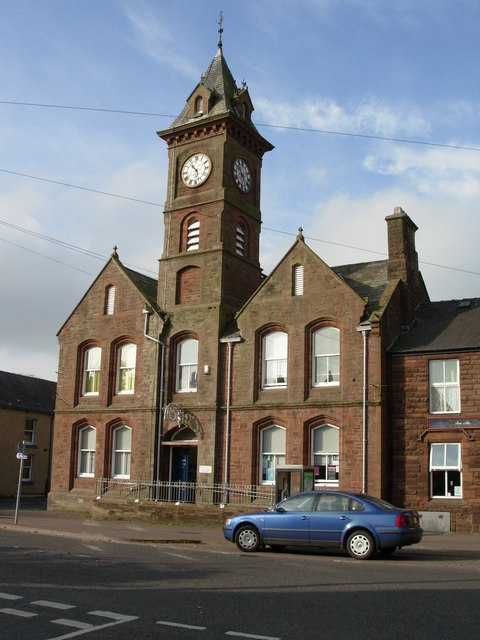
Egremont Town Hall

Egremont Urban District was abolished in 1934, with Egremont instead being given a parish council and reclassified as a rural parish within the Ennerdale Rural District. Ennerdale Rural District was abolished in 1974, becoming part of the Borough of Copeland in the new county of Cumbria. Copeland was in turn abolished in 2023 when the new Cumberland Council was created, also taking over the functions of the abolished Cumbria County Council in the area.

== Economy ==
Manufacturing industries have declined but service, new media and tourism industries have taken their place.

Egremont's Florence Mine was (until 2008) the last working deep iron ore mine left in Western Europe and produced ore, products for the cosmetics industry and high quality haematite for jewellery. The pit head is a listed building. The Florence Mine can be found just south of Egremont.

A large local employer is the nuclear site at nearby Sellafield. The last few years have seen the running down of the nuclear power industry and the growth of the nuclear decommissioning industry.

== Transport ==
Egremont formerly had a railway station on the Whitehaven, Cleator and Egremont Railway. It was first closed in 1935, with cycles of reopening and closure ending in 1947, but with a special school service running from 1964 to 1969. The nearest railway station is at Nethertown, but with a reduced service. St Bees railway station is the nearest mandatory stop station with a full service.

Bus services 6 and X6 link Egremont to Seascale, Gosforth and towns south of Egremont. There is one other bus service operated by Stagecoach that links to Whitehaven, Workington and Maryport (30).

The A595 bypasses Egremont, which gives strong links to Sellafield to the south and to the north, Whitehaven and Workington.

== Tourism ==
Egremont has Egremont Castle, Florence Mine, Hartley's Ice Cream, Lowes Court Gallery, various walks, Clint's Quarry (SSSI) and cycle paths.

== Community and culture ==
Egremont has a castle, several churches, two supermarkets and a market selling a variety of goods held every Friday.

It has had a brass band since 1904. The band aims to promote brass band music in the local area.

The town has one secondary school, West Lakes Academy, and three primary schools, which are Bookwell and Orgill primary schools, plus St Bridget's Catholic Primary School. Nearby Thornhill Primary School is sometimes counted as the fourth primary school.

It has an active public and community arts programme, called Creative Egremont. The town is home to Florence Arts Centre, based at the nearby Florence Mine (now disused), which has a programme of live events - gigs, theatre and stand-up comedy - and an art gallery. There is a studio on-site for the Florence Paintmakers, a co-operative of artists who use the local iron ore pigment to make oil and watercolour paints, pastels and other art materials.

Egremont also has a dedicated town freesheet, published by Egremont & District Labour Party and delivered to thousands of addresses in the town several times a year. The paper is financed by the Copeland Constituency Labour Party.

=== Crab Fair ===
Egremont's Crab Fair is held on the third Saturday in September annually, and features unusual events—such as the World Gurning Championships and greasy pole climbing. This fair is a major local event, with the town's high street being closed to normal traffic for street dancing and a parade, while sports such as Cumberland and Westmorland wrestling are held on a field nearby.

The fair's origins go back to 1267, and it is claimed to be one of the oldest fairs in the world. The Lord of Egremont started a tradition of giving away crab apples, from where the fair gets its name.

The Crab Fair was cancelled in 2020 and 2021 due to the COVID-19 pandemic. It was scheduled for the following year, but the Egremont Crab Fair Committee made the decision to cancel the 2022 event due to the death of Queen Elizabeth II. The Crab Fair returned in 2023 after a three-year hiatus.

== Population ==
At the 2021 census the built up area had a population of 5,795, and the parish had a population of 7,735. The parish population had been 7,444 in 2001, and 8,194 at the 2011 census.

== Notable residents ==
- William Benn English Non-Conformist Minister and author (b. 1600)
- John Lindow Calderwood, lawyer & politician, was born and brought up in Egremont, where his father was a local doctor.
- Musician and songwriter Francis Dunnery (the former frontman of It Bites, who scored a Top Ten British chart hit in 1986 with "Calling All the Heroes") was born and brought up in Egremont, as were his It Bites bandmates Bob Dalton and Dick Nolan.
- Martin Hodgson, the 1930s rugby league all-time-great forward for Swinton, Cumberland and Great Britain was born (1909) and bred in the town.
- Rob Purdham, international rugby league player, was born in Egremont in 1980.

== See also ==
- Listed buildings in Egremont, Cumbria
