= Josefina de Vasconcellos =

British sculptor

Josefina Alys Hermes de Vasconcellos MBE
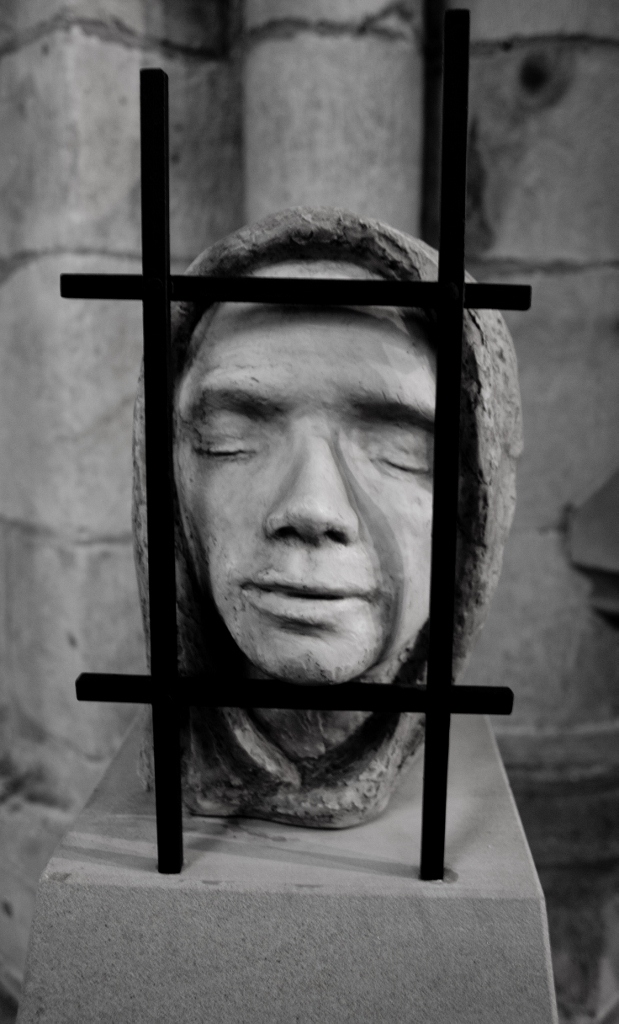
- Born: 26 October 1904; Molesey, Surrey, England
- Died: 20 July 2005 (aged 100); Blackpool, England
- Education: Bournemouth Art School; Regent Street Polytechnic; Académie de la Grande Chaumière; Royal Academy Schools
- Known for: Sculpture
- Spouse: Delmar Banner (m.1930–1983, his death)

Josefina Alys Hermes de Vasconcellos (26 October 1904 – 20 July 2005) was an English sculptor who worked in bronze, stone, wood, lead and perspex. She was at one time the world's oldest living sculptor. She lived in Little Langdale, Cumbria, much of her working life. Her most famous work includes Reconciliation (Coventry Cathedral, University of Bradford); Holy Family (Liverpool Cathedral, Gloucester Cathedral); Mary and Child (St Paul's Cathedral); and Nativity (at Christmas) at St Martin-in-the-Fields (Trafalgar Square).

== Biography ==
De Vasconcellos was born in Molesey in Surrey; she was the only child of Hippolyto de Vasconcellos, a Brazilian diplomat and Freda Coleman, an English Quaker.

After drawing lessons at Bournemouth Art School, de Vasconcellos studied at the Regent Street Polytechnic in London and, after the award of a Bronze Medal for Design in Sculpture during 1923, she studied in Florence under Guido Calore and Libero Andreotti before enrolling in the Académie de la Grande Chaumière in Paris, where she was taught by Antoine Bourdelle, one of Auguste Rodin's assistants. She first exhibited at the Royal Academy Summer Show in 1926, with The Repentance of St Hubert and completed her first major commission in 1929 for the Church of Saint Valéry in Varengeville-sur-Mer, Normandy, which included a life-sized reclining figure of Saint Valéry under a stone altar. After she returned to England, de Vasconcellos enrolled in the Royal Academy Schools and was placed second in the 1930 Prix de Rome contest.

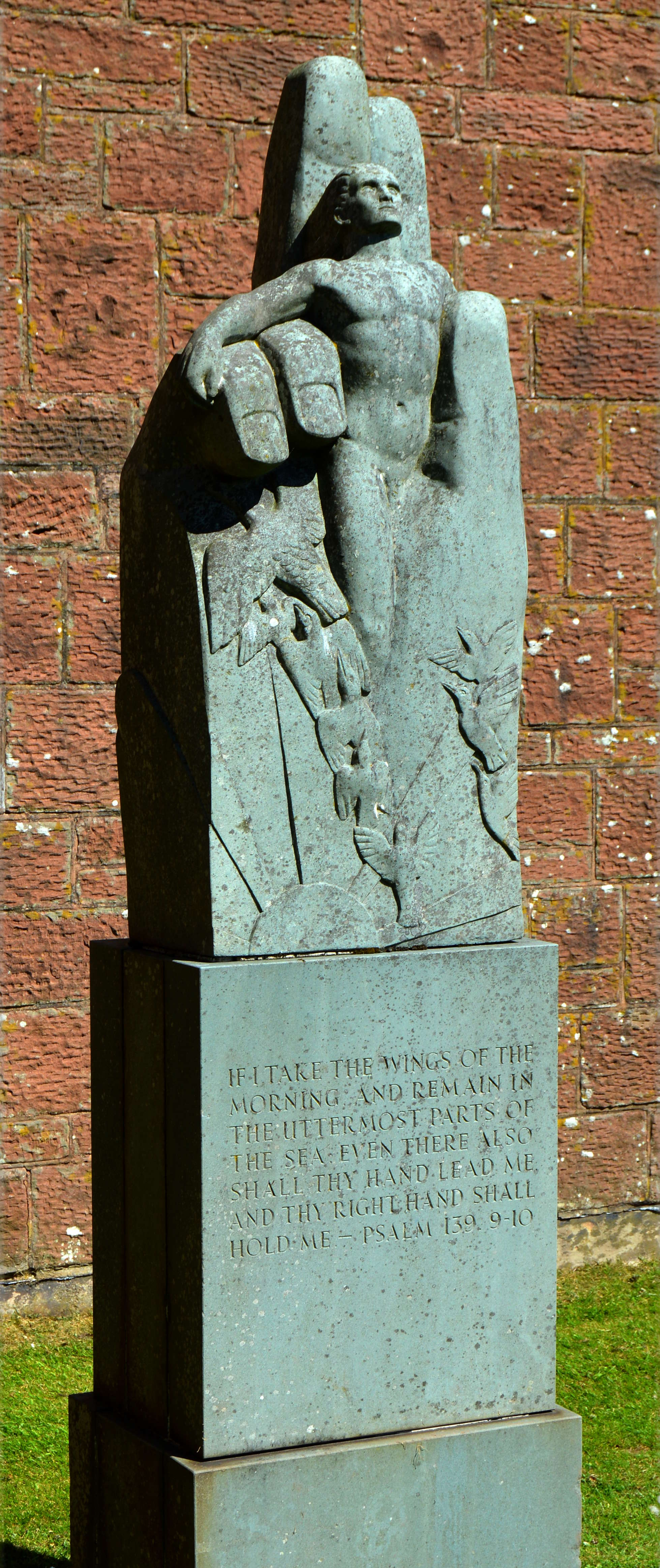
The Hand by Josephina de Vasconcellos, War Memorial Hall, St Bees School.

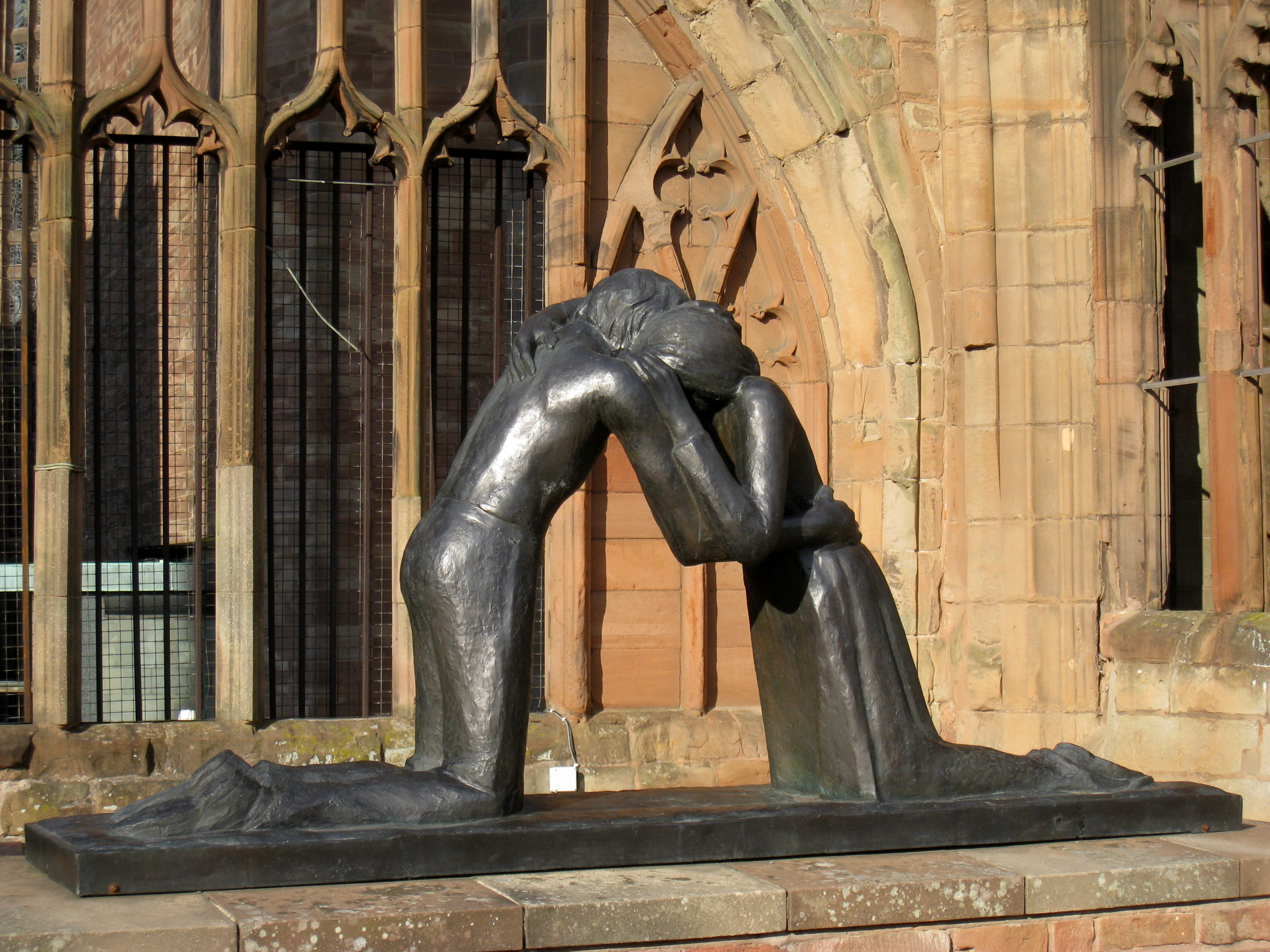
Bronze cast of Reconciliation in Coventry Cathedral

During the Second World War de Vasconcellos began working on a number of large sculptures including The Last Chimera, which is now in the grounds of the Canongate Kirk in Edinburgh and The Hand, a memorial in green slate to a friend killed in the war which now serves as a war memorial for St Bees School in Cumbria. After the war de Vasconcellos and her husband Delmar Banner established a studio in London, while maintaining their home in the Lake District. A joint exhibition of their work was held in December 1946 at the Royal Watercolour Society Gallery off Bond Street with some larger sculptures, including The Last Chimera displayed on a Piccadilly bombsite. This exhibition helped establish de Vasconcellos in the British art world. She became a regular exhibitor at the Royal Academy and at the Paris Salon. In 1948 she became the first female fellow of the Royal British Society of Sculptors, serving on its council and organising committee, and was also a founding member of the Society of Portrait Sculptors in 1953. Subjects of her portrait busts and sculptures included Lord Denning, Edith Sitwell, Roger Bannister, Norman Nicholson, General Sir William Platt, James Cameron and, in perspex, Tenzing Norgay. Other notable commissions included the Prince of Peace (1950, repaired in 1998), a war memorial in Aldershot. In 1955, with the help of students from St Paul's School, she created Mary and Child, a work that remains in the crypt of St Paul's Cathedral. In 1959, she was commissioned by the vicar of St Martin-in-the-Fields in Trafalgar Square in London to construct a Nativity scene of life-sized figures, which became a regular fixture of the church's Christmas display. In the 1990s she designed a memorial to the pilots who were based near her Lake District home during World War Two.

In 1977, the department of peace studies at Bradford University commissioned a sculpture that de Vasconcellos entitled Reunion. After its restoration in 1994 it was renamed Reconciliation, and in 1995, to mark the 50th anniversary of the end of World War II, bronze casts of this sculpture were placed in the ruins of Coventry Cathedral and in the Hiroshima Peace Park in Japan. An additional cast is in the grounds of Stormont in Belfast. To mark the opening of the rebuilt German Reichstag building in 1999, another cast was placed as part of the Berlin Wall memorial.

Throughout her life de Vasconcellos undertook numerous large commissions often carved in a flowing, naturalistic style. This contrasted with the more abstract styles of, for example Henry Moore and Barbara Hepworth. de Vasconcellos' subjects were frequently religious and many of her sculptures are in parish churches and cathedrals around Britain, including the cathedrals in Blackburn, Bristol, Carlisle, Gloucester, Liverpool, Norwich and Wells and in parishes such as St Bees Priory and St Mary's Church, Warrington. The National Art Gallery in Rio de Janeiro, Sheffield Art Galleries, Glasgow Art Galleries and the Civic Centre in Southampton all hold examples of her work.

De Vasconcellos was an active member of the Royal Society of Sculptors for much of her career.

== Personal life ==
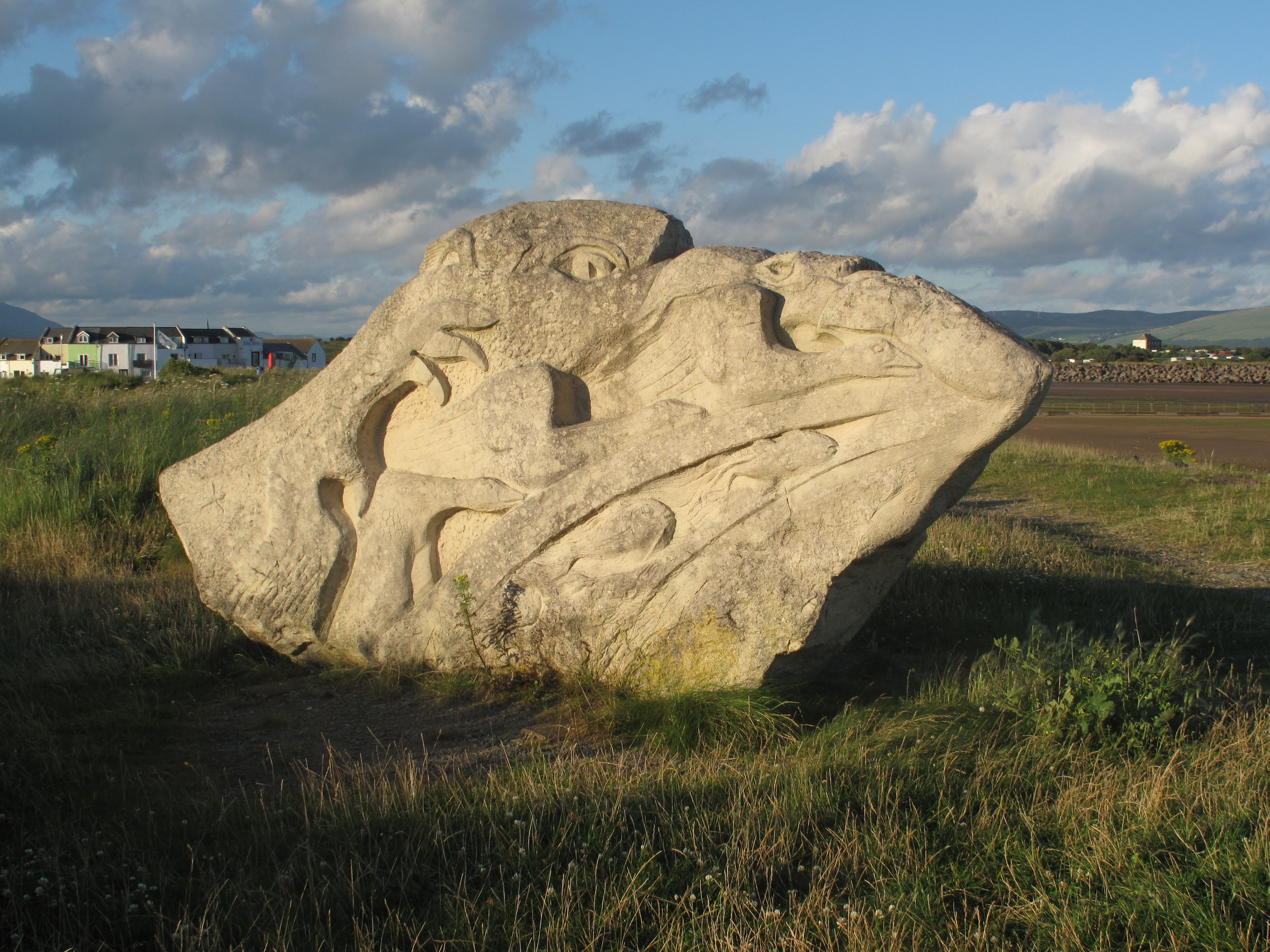
Escape to Light sculpture by de Vasconcellos at Haverigg.

In 1930 de Vasconcellos married the artist and academic Delmar Banner, who was an Anglican lay preacher, and they remained together until his death in 1983 and they adopted two children in 1940. Her husband led her to be received into the Church of England, and the topic of faith came to run through much of her artistic work. The couple adopted two boys, and the family settled in a farmhouse at The Bield in Little Langdale in the Lake District, where she made a studio in an outhouse, as well as decorating the house with carvings and a mural. de Vasconcellos and her husband were also god-parents to at least 20 children. In 1967, through associations with Pelham House School in West Cumbria, the family helped found the Beckstone Centre, an Outward Bound-type facility for disadvantaged boys at Beckstones in the Duddon Valley. In 1975, she initiated the founding of The Harriet Trust, on the Duddon Estuary at Millom so that disabled children could enjoy nature holidays within a purpose-built dwelling; the modified former fishing trawler The Harriet was used as a recreation space. It was such work, rather than her sculpture, that led to de Vasconcellos being awarded the Order of the British Empire in 1985.

=== Last years ===
In 1988, illness forced de Vasconcellos to leave Little Langdale, and for a time she was accommodated at Isel Hall near Cockermouth. She was able to find a small cottage and studio at Peggy Hill, Ambleside. She continued her creative work well into her 90s; her final piece, Escape to Light, located at Haverigg on the Cumbrian coast, was created in 2001 to commemorate the men of the Independent Off-Shore Rescue Service. de Vasconcellos died on 20 July 2005, a few months after her 100th birthday, at the Orchard Lodge nursing home, Blackpool. In her 99th year she published She was Loved: Memories of Beatrix Potter (printed by Titus Wilson), an account with letters of the friendship between the two, cultivated over many years, including a number of photographs of her sculptures and other illustrations.
