= Holy Trinity Church, Millom =

Coordinates: 54.2207°N 3.2729°W

Holy Trinity Church
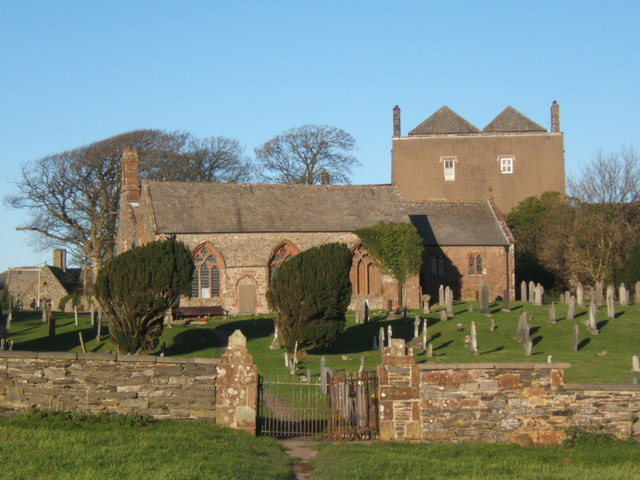
- Holy Trinity Church, Millom, from the south with Millom Castle in background

- Location in Copeland Borough Location in Cumbria
- OS grid reference: SD 171 813
- Location: Millom, Cumbria
- Country: England
- Denomination: Anglican
- Website: Holy Trinity, Millom

History
- Status: Parish church

Architecture
- Functional status: Active
- Heritage designation: Grade I
- Designated: 8 September 1967
- Architect(s): Hicks and Charlewood (1930 alterations)
- Architectural type: Church
- Style: Norman, Gothic

Specifications
- Materials: Stone, slate roofs

Administration
- Province: York
- Diocese: Carlisle
- Archdeaconry: Westmorland and Furness
- Deanery: Furness
- Parish: Millom

Clergy
- Abbot: Geoff Edmondson

Holy Trinity Church is a medieval building situated next to Millom Castle near the town of Millom, Cumbria, England. It is an active Anglican parish church in the deanery of Furness, the archdeaconry of Westmorland and Furness, and the diocese of Carlisle. Its benefice is united with those of St George (in the centre of Millom), St Anne, Thwaites, and St Luke, Haverigg. The church is recorded in the National Heritage List for England as a designated Grade I listed building.

== History ==
The earliest parts of the church are the nave and chancel, which date from the 12th century. The south aisle was added in the early 13th century, and was rebuilt in a more elaborate style in about 1335 as the Huddlestone Chapel. Some details were restored in the 19th century, and the south porch was added in 1906. More drastic alterations were carried out in 1930 by Hicks and Charlewood of Newcastle, which included making the chancel wider. During this work, and incorporated into the northeast corner of the chancel, were part of a cross-shaft dating probably from the 10th or 11th century, and another ancient boss. Also at this time a west gallery was installed.

== Architecture ==
=== Exterior ===
The church is constructed in stone rubble, with ashlar dressings, and it has slate roofs. The plan consists of a three-bay nave, a south aisle, a north porch, a smaller, lower chancel, and a small north vestry. On the west gable of the nave is a bellcote. In the north wall of the nave is a Norman doorway, and two round-headed windows. The south wall of the aisle has three three-light windows, and at the east end is a five-light window. The east window of the chancel has three lights. In the north wall of the chancel is a small 12th-century window, and the Anglo-Saxon stones have been re-set in the northeast corner.

=== Interior ===
Inside the church is a four-bay arcade carried on round and octagonal piers. The west gallery has four round piers. All the pews are box pews, and in the church are the Royal Arms of George I. In the south aisles are monuments, mainly to the Huddlestone family, the oldest being to Sir John Huddlestone, who died in 1484. The stained glass in the east window is by Clayton and Bell, and in a window on the south side of the south aisle is a window by Hugh Arnold, given to the church in 1908. The two-manual pipe organ was made in about 1930 by Harrison and Harrison of Durham.

== External features ==
Associated with the church are three structures, each of which is listed at Grade II. To the north of the church is a stone cross base, probably that of a market cross, which probably dates from the medieval era. It consists of an octagonal stone with carvings on the sides, and a socket on its top. To the south of the church is a chest tomb dating from the early 18th century; it is a memorial to the Postlethwaite family. Also to the south of the church is a sundial, probably also medieval. It consists of an octagonal shaft on a square base, and has a head carved with coats of arms.

== See also ==
- Grade I listed churches in Cumbria
- Grade I listed buildings in Cumbria
- Listed buildings in Millom
