= Cumbria 2 =

English rugby union league for Cumbria-based clubs

Counties 2 Cumbria
- Current season or competition: 2026-27 Counties 2 Cumbria
- Sport: Rugby union
- Instituted: 2018; 8 years ago
- Ceased: 2019; 7 years ago
- Number of teams: 10
- Country: England
- Most titles: Silloth (1 title)
- Website: Cumbria Rugby Union

Counties 2 Cumbria (formerly Cumbria 2) is a league at tier 8 of the English rugby union system run by the English Rugby Football Union for club sides based in Cumbria. Teams are promoted to Counties 1 Cumbria and as it was the lowest ranked RFU league in the county there is no relegation.

Cumbria 2 was formed for the 2018–19 season when the RFU had to restructure the Cumbria and northern leagues due to 19 Lancashire based clubs withdrawing from the league structure to form their own competition. A consequence of this was that North Lancashire/Cumbria was cancelled and the Cumbria League was split into two divisions, with the North Lancashire/Cumbria clubs joining the top 3 Cumbria League clubs in Cumbria 1, and the rest of the sides (including some 2nd XV teams) forming Cumbria 2.

After just one season Cumbria 2 was cancelled with teams moving into a single division Cumbria 1. However, ahead of the 2026-27 season the league was reinstated under its new name.

== 2026-27 ==
Team	Ground	Capacity	City/Area	Previous season
Ambleside	Galava Park		Ambleside, Cumbria	Demoted from Counties 1 Cumbria (9th)
Creighton	Sycamore Lane		Carlisle, Cumbria	Demoted from Counties 1 Cumbria (11th)
Furness	The Strawberry Grounds		Barrow-in-Furness, Cumbria	Re-entry
Keswick II	Davidson Park		Keswick, Cumbria	Demoted from Counties 1 Cumbria (12th)
Millom	Wilson Park		Haverigg, Millom, Cumbria	Demoted from Counties 1 Cumbria (14th)
Penrith II	Winters Park		Penrith, Cumbria	Demoted from Counties 1 Cumbria (13th)
Windermere	Dawes Meadow		Bowness-on-Windermere, Cumbria	Demoted from Counties 1 Cumbria (10th)
Workington	The Ellis Sports Ground		Workington, Cumbria	Demoted from Counties 1 Cumbria (8th)

Locations of the 2026-27 Counties Cumbria 2 teams

== 2019-26 ==
Not contested

== Teams 2018–19 ==
Team	Ground	Capacity	City/Area	Previous season
Aspatria Eagles (2nd XV)	Bower Park		Aspatria, Cumbria	Joined from Cumbria Shield League (4th)
Carlisle Crusaders (2nd XV)	Rugby Ground, Warwick Road		Carlisle, Cumbria	Relegated from Cumbria League (7th)
Creighton	Sycamore Lane		Carlisle, Cumbria	Joined from Cumbria Shield League (5th)
Egremont	Bleach Green		Egremont, Cumbria	Relegated from Cumbria League (9th)
Furness	The Strawberry Grounds		Barrow-in-Furness, Cumbria	Relegated from Cumbria League (4th)
Millom	Wilson Park		Haverigg, Millom, Cumbria	10th (Cumbria League)
Silloth	The Jim Brough Rugby Park		Silloth, Cumbria	Relegated from Cumbria League (5th)
Wigton Wanderers (2nd XV)	Lowmoor Road		Wigton, Cumbria	Joined from Cumbria Shield League (champions)
Windermere	Dawes Meadow		Bowness-on-Windermere, Cumbria	Relegated from Cumbria League (8th)
Workington	The Ellis Sports Ground	12,000 (2,000 seats)	Workington, Cumbria	Relegated from Cumbria League (6th)

Locations of the 2018–19 Cumbria 2 teams

== Cumbria 2 honours ==
Cumbria 2 Honours
Season	No of Teams	Champions	Runners–up	Relegated Teams	League Name
2018-19	10	Silloth	Workington	No relegation	Cumbria 2
Green backgrounds are promotion places.

== Number of league titles ==
- Silloth (1)

== See also ==
- Cumbria RU
- English rugby union system
- Rugby union in England
