= Holborn Hill =

Settlement in Cumbria, England

Coordinates: 54.212°N 3.277°W

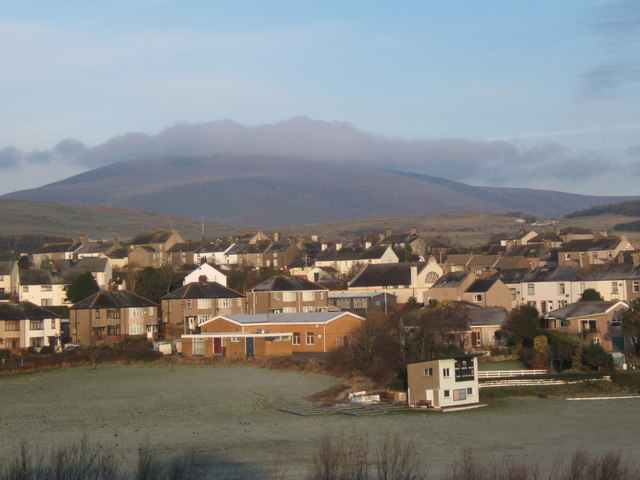
- Holborn Hill area of Millom

- Location in Copeland Borough Location within Cumbria
- Population: 2,461 (2011)
- OS grid reference: SD167803
- Civil parish: Millom
- Unitary authority: Cumberland
- Ceremonial county: Cumbria
- Region: North West
- Country: England
- Sovereign state: United Kingdom
- Post town: MILLOM
- Postcode district: LA18
- Dialling code: 01229
- Police: Cumbria
- Fire: Cumbria
- Ambulance: North West
- UK Parliament: Barrow and Furness

Holborn Hill is a street and a ward in the town of Millom, in Cumbria, England. Historically it was a village in the administrative county of Cumberland and predates Millom. In 2001 the population of the ward was 2,562, living in 1,083 households, reducing at the 2011 Census to a population of 2,461, living in 1,061 households.

== History ==
Holborn Hill was once an important place for travellers crossing the Duddon Estuary on their way up the west Cumbrian coast. Evidence of one of the coaching inns, the Pilot Inn, can still be seen in the form of an inscription on a block of houses near the junction of Holborn Hill and Newton Terrace. The inscription reads:

William and Ann Barren live heare, who mostly keep good ale and beer, 1745. You who intend to cross ye sand, call here a gide at your command.

Millom railway station was formerly called Holborn Hill halt before the building of Millom new town.

The ancient monuments of Millom Castle (private) and Holy Trinity Church are about one mile from Holborn Hill via footpath or road. A charter to hold a market was granted by King Henry III of England to John de Huddleston, Lord of Millom in 1251 and the market was held at Holborn Hill. A charter for a fair at the feast of Holy Trinity was also granted at the same time.
