= Listed buildings in Millom =

Millom is a civil parish in the Cumberland district of Cumbria, England. It contains twelve buildings that are recorded in the National Heritage List for England. Of these, two are listed at Grade I, the highest of the three grades, and the others are at Grade II, the lowest grade. The parish contains the town of Millom and the surrounding countryside. Until the middle of the 19th century the parish was mainly rural. The railway arrived in 1850, iron mining began in the 1860s, and the town grew rapidly. Only one listed building survives from the mining industry, a former office. The other listed buildings are two churches, one dating from the 13th century, the other from the 19th century, and structures in and around their churchyards, a former manor house with a great tower and associated gate piers, and three war memorials.

== Key ==
Grade	Criteria
I	Buildings of exceptional interest, sometimes considered to be internationally important
II	Buildings of national importance and special interest

== Buildings ==
Name and location	Photograph	Date	Notes	Grade
Holy Trinity Church; 54.22068°N 3.27293°W		12th century	The south aisle was added in the early 13th century, and it was converted into the Hudleston Chapel in about 1335. There was a small restoration in the 19th century, the north porch was added in 1906, and there was a greater restoration in 1930, which included widening the chancel. The church is built in stone, the roofs are in slate, and it consists of a nave, a north porch, a south aisle, and a chancel with a north vestry. On the west gable is a bellcote, and the north doorway is Norman. Anglo-Saxon carved stones have been incorporated in the walls of the chancel. Inside the church are box pews and a west gallery.	I
Cross base 54.22081°N 3.27290°W	—	Medieval (probable)	The cross base is in the churchyard of Holy Trinity Church, and probably originated as a market cross. It consists of an octagonal stone, with damaged carvings, and has a socket for a cross on the top.	II
Sundial; 54.22059°N 3.27281°W	—	Medieval (probable)	The sundial is in the churchyard of Holy Trinity Church, and the shaft is probably later than the head. The sundial is in ashlar stone, and consists of a square base, an octagonal shaft, and a head with chamfered angles, containing carved shields with coats of arms. On the top is a depression for a round plate.	II
Millom Castle; 54.22094°N 3.27254°W		14th century	Originally a castle or manor house with a moat, the great tower was added possibly in the late 15th century. The tower and part of the house remain intact, and are in use as a farmhouse, but the rest of the house is a ruin. The tower is in stone, it has five storeys, paired hipped slate roofs, and is 50 feet (15 m) square, with walls 7 feet (2.1 m) thick. There is a later two-storey wing to the west, and most of the windows are sashes. The ruined portions of the building are designated as a scheduled monument.	I
Gate piers, Millom Castle; 54.22091°N 3.27201°W	—	17th or 18th century (probable)	The gate piers are to the east of the castle, and were part of a formal garden. They are in ashlar stone, and are rusticated with cornices and ball finials.	II
Postlethwaite memorial 54.22065°N 3.27273°W	—	Early 18th century	The memorial is in the churchyard of Holy Trinity Church. It consists of an ashlar chest tomb with a moulded base and panels on the sides. The top is also moulded, and contains an inscribed rectangular copper plate in a stone architrave.	II
Former Hodbarrow Mine Office; 54.19903°N 3.27241°W		1873	The office has since been used for other purposes. It is in stone with bands, and has a hipped slate roof. There are two storeys and four bays. The doorways and windows, which are sashes, have architraves, and above the doors are fanlights.	II
St George's Church; 54.20885°N 3.27178°W		1874–77	The church, designed by Paley and Austin, is in sandstone with a slate roof. It consists of a nave, a north aisle, a south porch, a north transept, a chancel, a south vestry, and a steeple at the crossing. The steeple has a tower with angle buttresses, a stair turret, an embattled parapet with pinnacles, and a recessed octagonal spire with lucarnes. The windows contain Geometrical tracery.	II
Former vicarage 54.20920°N 3.27217°W	—	c. 1875	The vicarage to St George's Church has later been used as a care home. It is in stone with a band, and has a slate roof. There are two storeys with attics, the north front has three bays, and to the west is a single-storey service wing. On the front are a canted gabled bay window and a gabled dormer. Most of the windows are sashes. On the east front is a doorway with a dated and battlemented lintel.	II
Boer War Memorial; 54.20908°N 3.27137°W		1905	The memorial to the Boer War is in the churchyard of St George's Church. It is on a stepped base, and consists of a tapering plinth, a tapering shaft, and a head in the form of a Celtic cross. The plinth and shaft are carved with vines and interlace, and on the plinth is a dragon. The memorial is in a square enclosure surrounded by a low wall and iron railings.	II
Haverigg War Memorial; 54.19693°N 3.29239°W		1920	The war memorial stands in the churchyard of St Luke's Church. It is in limestone, and consists of a wheel-head cross on a tapering shaft, a tapering plinth, and a single-step base. On the head is a monogram, and there is an inscription on the shaft. On the plinth are the names of those lost in the two World Wars. Around the base are marble chippings and a low kerb.	II
Millom War Memorial; 54.21103°N 3.27171°W		1925	The memorial was initially to those lost in the First World War, and the names of those lost in the Second World War were added later. The memorial is in ashlar stone, and stands on four hexagonal steps. It has a two-stepped hexagonal base, a hexagonal plinth, and a hexagonal shaft with a cap carved with shields. On the plinth are panels, three inscribed with the names of those lost, and three with reliefs of a soldier, a sailor and an airman. On top of the memorial is a carving of St Michael and the Devil. Around the memorial are four cast iron lamp posts.	II
