= Listed buildings in Millom Without =

Millom Without is a civil parish in the Cumberland district of Cumbria, England. It contains 14 listed buildings that are recorded in the National Heritage List for England. Of these, one is listed at Grade II*, the middle of the three grades, and the others are at Grade II, the lowest grade. The parish is to the north of the town of Millom in the valley of the River Duddon. It is now almost completely rural, but in the past has been the site of industry, including iron smelting fired by charcoal. There are remains of this industry in form of the ruins of a blast furnace and barns for storing charcoal, both of which are listed. The parish also contains a disused cornmill and sawmill. The other listed buildings are houses and associated structures, a farmhouse and farm buildings, two bridges, a former limekiln, and a church.

== Key ==
Grade	Criteria
II*	Particularly important buildings of more than special interest
II	Buildings of national importance and special interest

== Buildings ==
Name and location	Photograph	Date	Notes	Grade
Old Broadgate bank barns 54.26934°N 3.25986°W	—	17th century (possible)	There are two barns, the later barn dating from the late 18th or early 19th century. They are in stone with quoins, slate roofs, and two storeys. The larger barn is orientated north-south and incorporates a two-bay worker's cottage, and an added bay to the north. The openings, some of which have segmental heads, include doorways, windows, some of the sashes, a garage door, and slit vents. On the left return is a pigeon loft and ledges. To the rear is a detached smaller barn, with a doorway, windows, and ramped access to the upper floor on the right return.	II
Charcoal barns, Duddon Iron Furnace; 54.28379°N 3.23605°W		Early 18th century	There are two charcoal barns, now ruined, one dating from later in the century. They are in stone, without roofs, forming an L-shaped plan, and there is a two-storey lean-to at the northeast. The earlier barn has a segmental opening, and the later barn has a first floor opening. The southeast wall is supported by buttresses. The barns are part of a scheduled monument.	II
Old Broadgate Farmhouse, barn and outbuilding 54.26908°N 3.26021°W		Early 18th century	The buildings are in rendered stone with Welsh slate roofs and two storeys. The doorway has a moulded architrave and the windows are sashes. Associated is a small single-storey outbuilding with a reset datestone. The barn to the west has opposing entrances, and a pitching door on the upper floor.	II
Duddon Iron Furnace; 54.28400°N 3.23548°W		1736	The remains of charcoal fired blast furnace for smelting iron. It is in stone and has a square tower-like furnace stack 40 feet (12 m) high, with wide round-headed openings. To the west is a roofless two-storey building, and to the south of this is a narrower two-storey building, also roofless. To the east of the furnace stack are the lower courses of the former blowing house, and to the south are the lower courses of the casting house. The remains are part of a scheduled monument.	II*
Duddon Bridge; 54.28292°N 3.23147°W		18th century (probable)	The bridge carries the A595 road over the River Duddon. It is in stone, and consists of three segmental arches with triangular cutwaters on both sides. The bridge has thin voussoirs and a low plain parapet.	II
Old Broadgate bank barn and steading 54.26963°N 3.25972°W	—	18th century	The bank barn and steading are in stone, partly painted, with quoins. The barn has a corrugated roof and a T-shaped plan, and contains byres on the ground floor and storage for threshing and grain above. The steading has a slate roof and a U-shaped plan, and consists of a pair of parallel ranges, later joined by a range at the north.	II
Rawfold bridge 54.29653°N 3.23710°W		18th century (possible)	The bridge carries a road over the River Duddon. It is in stone, and consists of two segmental arches, that to the east being longer. The central pier stands on an outcrop of rock. The bridge has voussoirs and straight parapets.	II
Low Broadgate Steading; 54.26515°N 3.26226°W		Late 18th or early 19th century	A group of field barns in stone with slate roofs and two storeys. They form an L-shaped plan, and consist of a threshing barn, and a small byre and barn at right angles. They contain entrances, windows and slit vents.	II
Broadgate; 54.26938°N 3.25893°W	—	Early 19th century	A country house in stuccoed stone with a hipped slate roof, in two storeys with an attic. The south front has three bays and an entrance with a Tuscan porch. The east front has five bays, the central bay projecting forward under a gable. Most of the windows are sashes, in the south gable is an oculus, and there is a central French window in the east front.	II
Duddon Hall; 54.29535°N 3.24027°W		Early 19th century	A country house later divided into apartments. It is stuccoed, with a band, it is in two storeys, and its windows are sashes. The west front has six bays, and contains a porch with Doric half-columns and an entablature. The east front has three doorways with fanlights.	II
Limekiln; 54.27935°N 3.24235°W	—	Early 19th century (probable)	The limekiln is in stone and consists of a square structure built into the slope of the ground. On the top is a round-headed fire hole. There are also remains of the kiln at the sides.	II
Garden temple, Duddon Hall; 54.29580°N 3.24007°W	—	1843	In 2007 the building was extended for residential use. The original part is in stone, and on the east front is a Corinthian portico that has a pediment with a wreath, a parapet with urns on the angles, and a datestone surmounted by a stag. The doorway has an architrave and a pediment, and the windows have segmental pediments. On the sides are Corinthian fluted pilasters and a balustraded parapet.	II
Thwaites Mill; 54.26888°N 3.25705°W	—	19th century (probable)	A former cornmill and sawmill in stone with a slate roof. The cornmill has gabled wings to the south and north, and to the east is a gabled wheelhouse containing a wheel and a concrete channel. The sawmill is to the east of this, and has a large south wing, and ball finials on the gables.	II
St Anne's Church; 54.25869°N 3.26335°W		1853–54	The church, designed by E. G. Paley, is in stone rubble with sandstone dressings, and has a slate roof with copings and cross finials. It consists of a nave with a clerestory, a south aisle, a chancel, and a north vestry. At the eastern and of the nave is a bellcote. At the west end is a rose window, and the east window consists of a triple lancet.	II
