= St Anne's Church, Thwaites =

Coordinates: 54.2587°N 3.2633°W

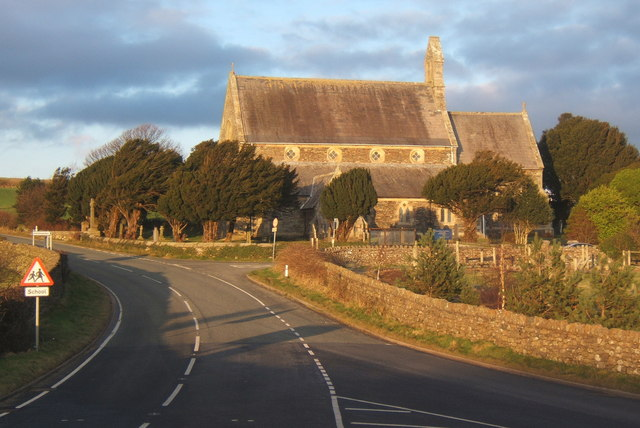
- St Anne's Church, Thwaites, from the south

- Location in Cumbria
- OS grid reference: SD 178,855
- Location: Thwaites, Cumbria
- Country: England
- Denomination: Anglican
- Website: St Anne, Thwaites

History
- Status: Parish church
- Dedication: Saint Anne

Architecture
- Functional status: Active
- Heritage designation: Grade II
- Designated: 14 June 1989
- Architect: E. G. Paley
- Architectural type: Church
- Style: Gothic Revival
- Completed: 1854

Specifications
- Materials: Stone rubble with sandstone ashlar dressings Slated roofs

Administration
- Province: York
- Diocese: Carlisle
- Archdeaconry: Furness
- Deanery: Millom
- Parish: St. Anne Thwaites

St Anne's Church is in the village of Thwaites, Cumbria, England. It is an active Anglican parish church in the deanery of Millom, the archdeaconry of Furness, and the diocese of Carlisle. Its benefice is united with those of St George, Millom, Holy Trinity, Millom, and St Luke, Haverigg. The church is recorded in the National Heritage List for England as a designated Grade II listed building.

== History ==
The church replaced a chapel of ease on the other site of the road, which was built in 1721 and consecrated in 1725. This church was built in 1853–54, and designed by the Lancaster architect E. G. Paley, at a cost of £1,678 (equivalent to £160,000 as of 2025). It was consecrated on 16 June 1854 by the bishop of Chester.

== Architecture ==
=== Exterior ===
St Anne's is constructed in stone rubble with sandstone ashlar dressings. It is roofed with large slates. The plan consists of a four-bay nave with a clerestory, a south aisle, a chancel, and a north vestry. On the east end of the nave is a bellcote. There are cross finials on the east and west gables. At the west end there are three two-light windows under a rose window. Along the north wall of the nave and the south wall of the aisle are two-light windows containing plate tracery. The clerestory windows are quatrefoils in roundels. The east window in the chancel consists of a triple lancet window, there are three lancets on the south side of the chancel, and one on the north. The vestry has a three-light north window, and a single-light window and doorway to the east.

=== Interior ===
Inside the church, the south arcade is carried on circular piers. The stone reredos dates from 1863, and has marble colonnettes. All the stained glass is by William Wailes, other than a north window in the nave dated 1914 by Powells. The stone font and pulpit were carved by George Henry Redpath Young of Ulverston in 1854 at a cost of £34.10s having been commissioned by Elizabeth Lewthwaite, gentlewoman of Broadgate.

== See also ==
- Listed buildings in Millom Without
- List of works by Sharpe and Paley
