= Reconciliation (Josefina de Vasconcellos sculpture) =

Statue by Josefina de Vasconcellos at Coventry Cathedral

Coordinates: 53.7909°N 1.7672°W

- Interactive map of Reconciliation
- Designer: Josefina de Vasconcellos
- Type: Sculpture

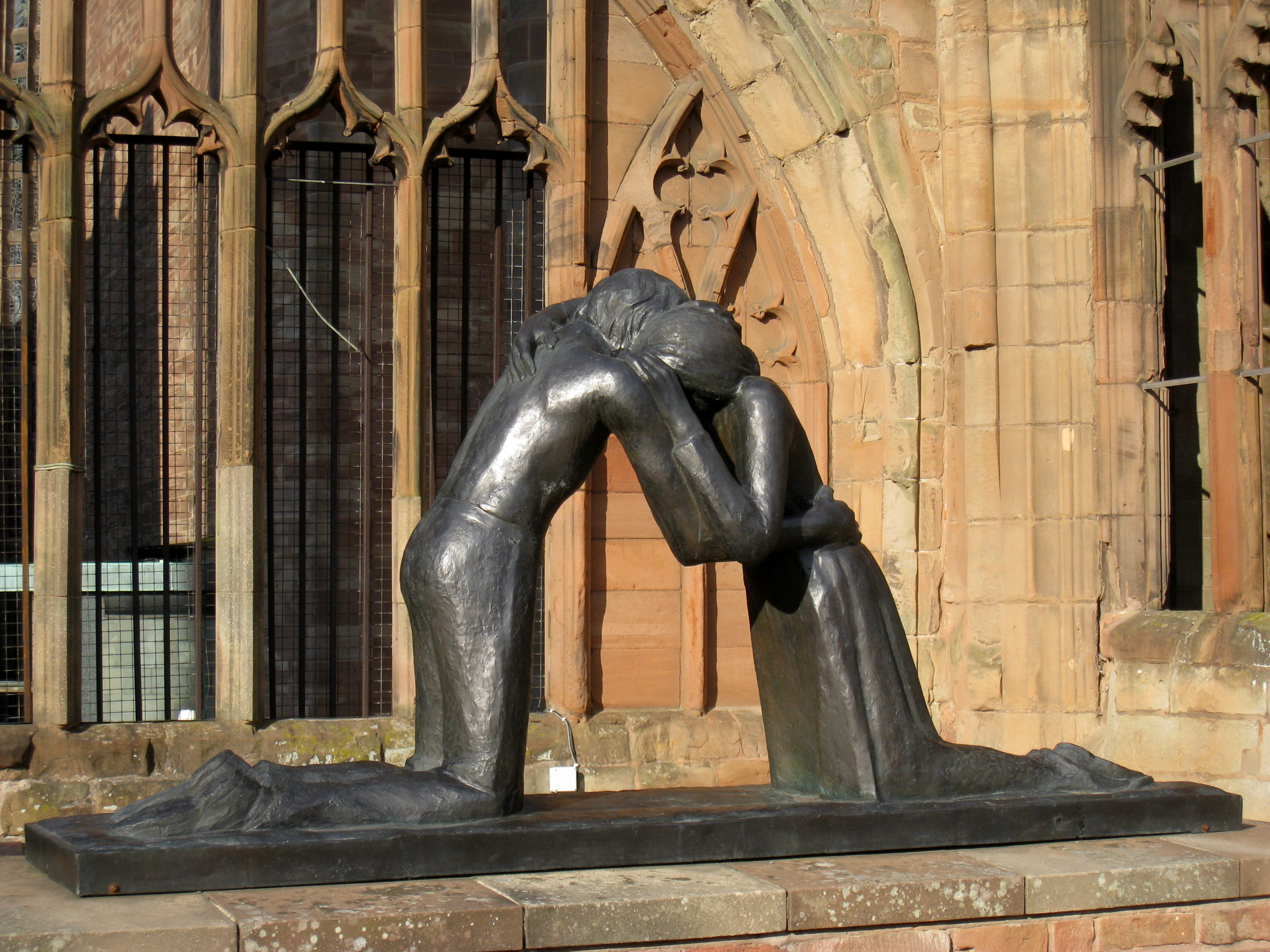
Reconciliation, by Josefina de Vasconcellos, in St. Michael's Cathedral, Coventry.

Reconciliation (originally named Reunion) is a sculpture by Josefina de Vasconcellos.

Originally created in 1977 and entitled Reunion, it depicted a man and woman embracing each other. In May 1998 it was presented to University of Bradford as a memorial to the university's first vice-chancellor, Professor Ted Edwards. De Vasconcellos said:

"The sculpture was originally conceived in the aftermath of the War. Europe was in shock, people were stunned. I read in a newspaper about a woman who crossed Europe on foot to find her husband, and I was so moved that I made the sculpture. Then I thought that it wasn't only about the reunion of two people but hopefully a reunion of nations which had been fighting."

Later it was taken for repairs to the sculptor's workshop, and renamed Reconciliation upon the request of the Peace Studies Department of the university. It was unveiled for the second time, under the new name, on de Vasconcellos 90th birthday, 26 October 1994.

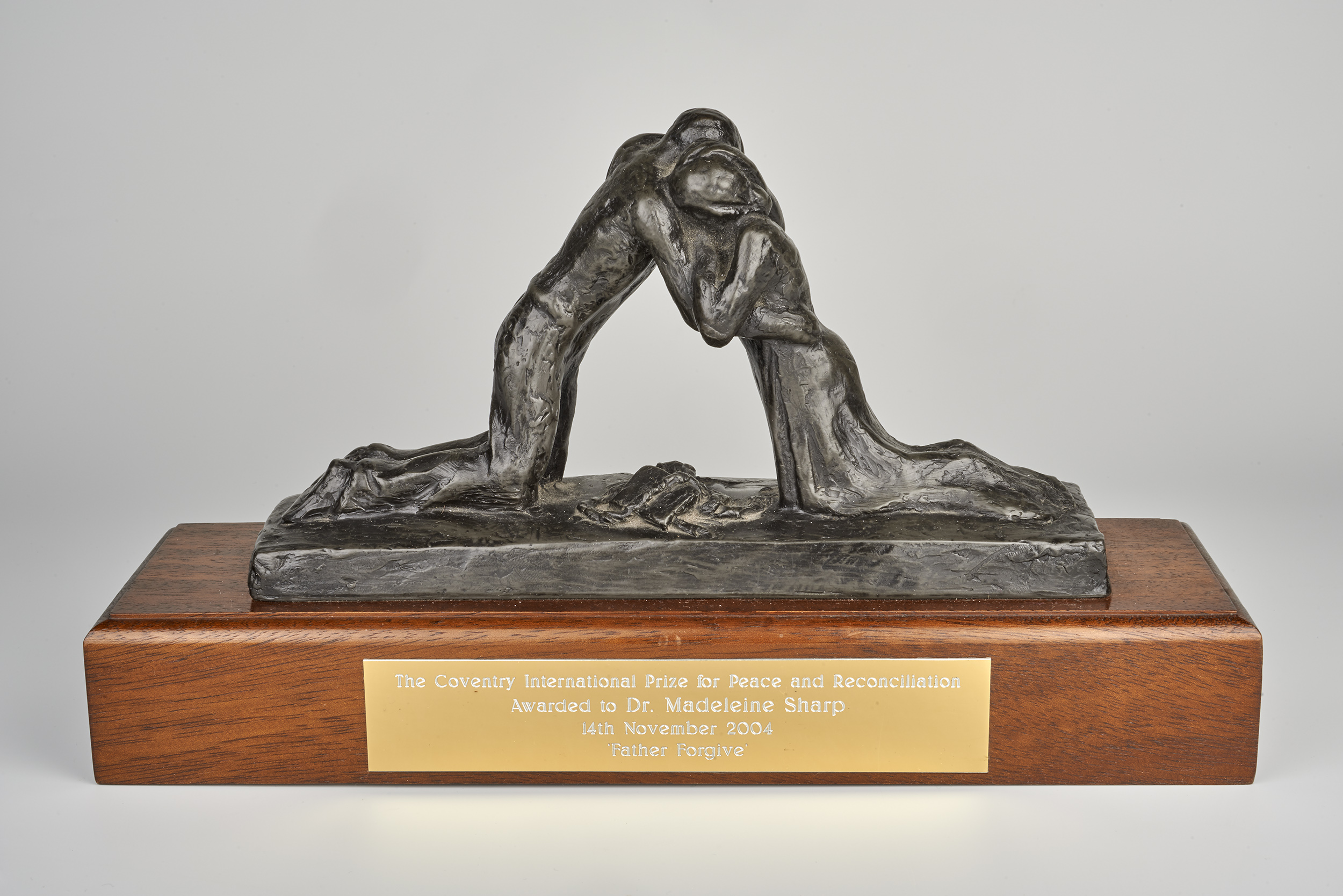
The Coventry International Prize for Peace and Reconciliation is modelled on the statue

In 1995 (to mark the 50th anniversary of the end of World War II) bronze casts of this sculpture (as Reconciliation) were placed in the ruins of Coventry Cathedral and in the Hiroshima Peace Park in Japan. An additional cast can be found in the Stormont Estate in Belfast. To mark the opening of the rebuilt German Reichstag (parliament building) and to commemorate the tenth anniversary of the fall of the Berlin Wall in 1999, another cast was placed as part of the Chapel of Reconciliation in Berlin.
