= Delmar Banner =

British painter

- Born: 28 January 1896; Freiburg im Breisgau, Germany
- Died: 8 November 1983 (aged 87); Ambleside, England
- Occupation: Painter
- Spouse: Josefina de Vasconcellos (married 1930)

Delmar Banner (28 January 1896 – 8 November 1983) was a German-born British painter who worked predominantly as a landscape and portrait artist. One of his best known works is his 1938 portrait of Beatrix Potter, in the collection of the National Portrait Gallery, London. His work was part of the painting event in the art competition at the 1948 Summer Olympics.

== Early life ==
Delmar Harmood Banner was born on 28 January 1896 in Freiburg im Breisgau, Germany, where his grandfather was an Anglican chaplain. He spoke German until he was seven, when his family moved back to England.

He attended Cheltenham College, received a BA in history from Magdalen College, University of Oxford in 1917 and attended the Regent Street Polytechnic School of Art from 1919 to 1927. There he met the Brazilian artist Josefina de Vasconcellos, whom he married in London in 1930. They settled in the Lake District, where they lived in a mountainside farmhouse at The Bield, Little Langdale.

== Career ==
In Cumbria, the couple met the artist, writer and farmer Beatrix Potter and became close friends, with Potter encouraging Banner's development as a painter. In 1938, he painted Potter's portrait in oils. In 1948, Banner donated the painting to the National Portrait Gallery, London.

After the Second World War, the couple established a studio in London, while maintaining their home in the Lake District. They often exhibited their work together, with joint exhibitions held in London (1947 and 1954) and Bradford (1987).

In 1948, he represented Great Britain in the painting event in the art competition at the Summer Olympics.

He painted mainly portraits and landscapes, many of them featuring the Cumbrian Fells. Other, more formal, portraits by Banner are in the collections of the Universities of Oxford and Cambridge, and the Nottingham Castle Museum and Art Gallery. His landscape paintings are held in numerous public collections across the UK, including Abbot Hall, Ferens Art Gallery, Leicester Museum and Art Gallery and Sunderland Museum and Winter Gardens

== Personal life ==
Banner became an Anglican lay preacher and he and Josefina adopted two boys in 1940. Delmar and Josefina were godparents to at least 20 children and in 1967, through associations with Pelham House School in West Cumbria, they helped found the Beckstone Centre, an outward bound-type facility for disadvantaged boys.

The couple shared a love of nature and the arts and, despite Banner's homosexuality, remained together until his death. Delmar died in Ulverston, South Lakes in 1983, aged 87, and is buried at Langdale Cemetery, Chapel Stile, South Lakes.
