= Thwaites, Cumbria =

Village in Cumbria, England

Coordinates: 54.257°N 3.259°W

Thwaites
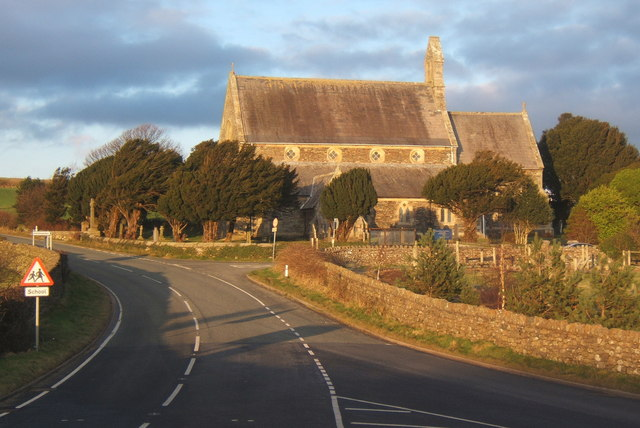
- St Anne's Church, Thwaites

- Location in Copeland Borough Location within Cumbria
- OS grid reference: SD179853
- Civil parish: Millom Without
- Unitary authority: Cumberland
- Ceremonial county: Cumbria
- Region: North West
- Country: England
- Sovereign state: United Kingdom
- Post town: MILLOM
- Postcode district: LA18
- Dialling code: 01229
- Police: Cumbria
- Fire: Cumbria
- Ambulance: North West
- UK Parliament: Barrow and Furness

Thwaites is a small village near Duddon Valley and on the edge of the Duddon Estuary in the Lake District National Park in the district of Cumberland (unitary authority), Cumbria, England. The River Duddon flows through the valley, rising in the mountains between Eskdale and Langdale, before flowing into the Irish Sea near Broughton in Furness. In its lower reaches it is bounded by the Furness Fells and Harter Fell.

Thwaites has an impressive sized church for the small population — the neighbouring villages of The Green, Broad Gate, Hallthwaites and Lady Hall all use St Anne's Church.

Close by along the Duddon Valley are steep roads leading over the Hardknott Pass to Eskdale and east over the Wrynose Pass to the Langdale valleys. A less steep pass to Eskdale over Birker Fell leaves the Duddon Valley at Ulpha, with extensive views of the Scafell range. There is also the Corney Fell Road from Duddon Bridge or Broad Gate over to Waberthwaite and Broad Oak near Muncaster Castle.
