= Millom School =

Location
- Salthouse Road; Millom; Cumbria, LA18 5AB; England; 54.21326°N 3.26853°W

Information
- Type: Community school
- Established: 1905
- Local authority: Cumberland Council
- Department for Education URN: 112388 Tables
- Ofsted: Reports
- Executive Headteacher: Matt Savidge
- Gender: Coeducational
- Age: 11 to 18
- Enrolment: 499
- Capacity: 775
- Houses: Lowther, Morthing, Pennington, Seaton
- Website: millom.cumbria.sch.uk

Millom School, formerly Millom County Secondary School, is a coeducational secondary school and sixth form located in Millom in the English county of Cumbria.

== The school today ==
It is a comprehensive community school administered by Cumberland Council. There is an all weather sports pitch (not 4G) and the "Melvyn Bragg Drama Studio" which was opened in 2005.

Millom School offers GCSEs and BTECs as programmes of study for pupils, while students in the sixth form have the option to study from a range of A-levels and further BTECs.

The school's catchment area has "serious socio-economic problems due mainly to the demise of the mining industry".

== Academic performance and school inspections ==
In 2001 the school won the National Science Challenge Award, and in 2002 a teacher at the school was awarded the BP Award for Science Year.

In 2014 the school was inspected by Ofsted and judged Good. It was inspected again in 2018 and judged to Require Improvement; as of 2020 this is the most recent inspection.

In 2019, pupils' progress at GCSE was average. A level results in 2019 were below average.

== History ==
The school has its roots in a Pupil-Teacher Centre, which formally became a secondary school in 1905. The school therefore celebrated its centenary in 2005. It was rebuilt in 1938, and at that point grammar school provision was added. The school at this time was known as Millom County Secondary School, and was co-educational grammar school. In 1950 the headteacher noted the "local tendency to despise study and to the consequent difficulty of the school-master in getting any sound homework done", especially because of the long journeys some children had to school.

The technical side of the school included a Commercial School teaching secretarial skills.

The school in its current format was opened by Princess Alexandra in 1959. The school comprises three main teaching blocks with a few specialist classrooms to one side for practical lessons. The three blocks, originally called Lower, Middle and Upper Schools, are now referred as Lonsdale Building, Muncaster Building and Ulpha Building.

Since 1983, several specialist classrooms have been repurposed, losing woodworking and metalwork rooms, a typing room and a technical drawing room. The swimming pool (left to decay until unviable by Cumbria County Council) remains as dug. The Alexandra Hall, named after Princess Alexandra, is the school's main hall. The 'Melvyn Bragg' studio was added to the rear of the 'Alex Hall' in 2005 as a performing arts educational space.

The 'Ulpha Building' was extended as 'Millom Network Centre', later changing name to Millom Hub, offering space to external organisations. It has been relocated to Millom Work and Skills Centre in the Devonshire Road Industrial Estate. In 2019 the local authority took over responsibility for the network centre, and there were concerns about its future.

== Notable former pupils ==
- Cliff Addison, chemist
- Norman Nicholson, poet
- John Satterthwaite, bishop
