= Hodbarrow RSPB reserve =

Nature reserve in Cumbria, England

Coordinates: 54.1998°N 3.2651°W

RSPB Hodsbarrow
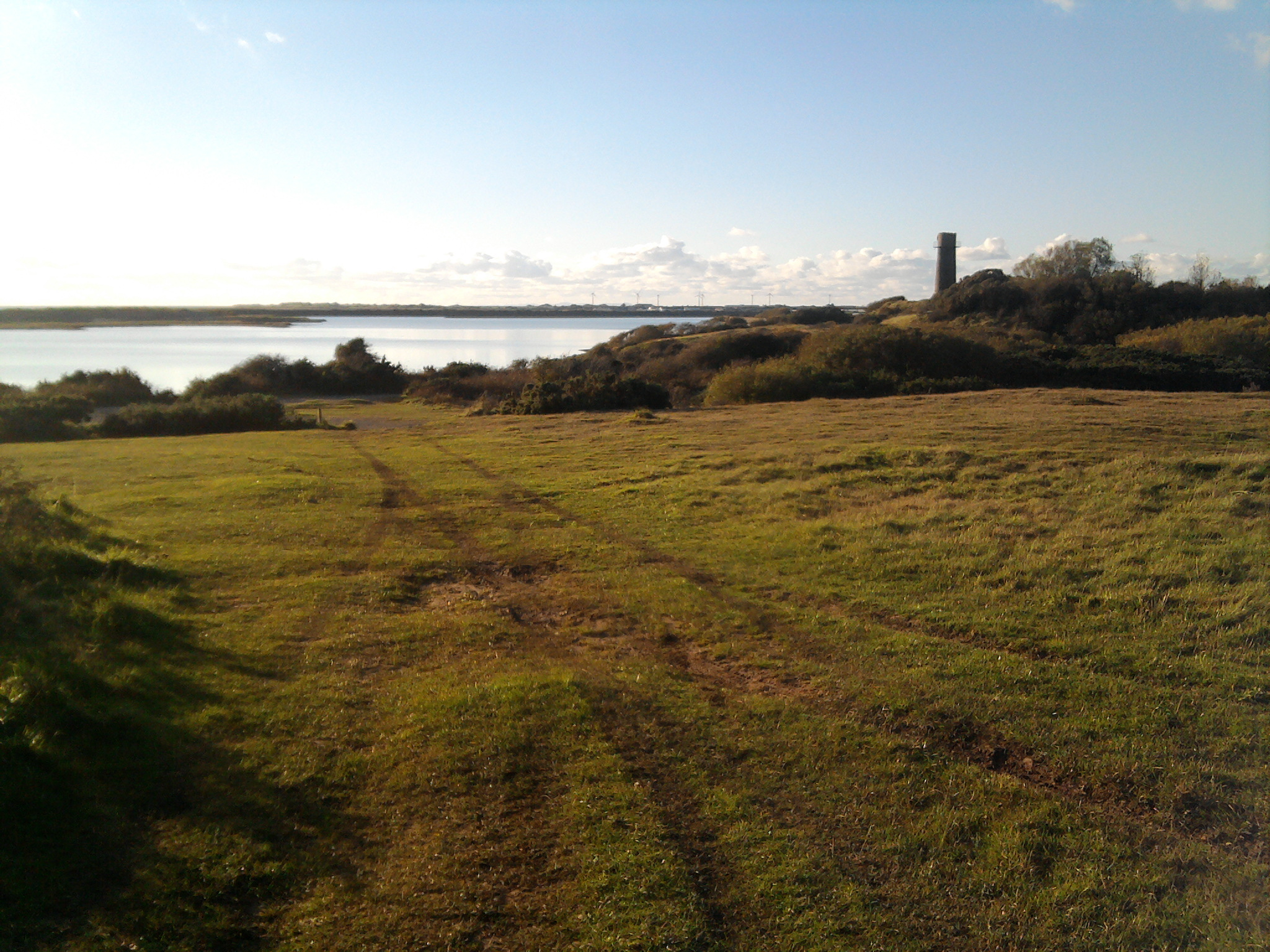
- View over reserve
- Interactive map of RSPB Hodsbarrow
- Location: Duddon Estuary, Cumbria, England
- Area: 3.28 ha (8.1 acres)
- Operator: Royal Society for the Protection of Birds
- Website: Hodbarrow

Hodbarrow RSPB Reserve is a nature reserve run by the Royal Society for the Protection of Birds (RSPB) on the edge of the Lake District National Park in Cumbria, England. It is on the Duddon Estuary near the town of Millom and covers an area of 3.28 hectares (8.1 acres).

== History ==
The nature reserve was purchased by the RSPB in 1986. It occupies a site where haematite iron ore was mined from c. 1850 until the 1960s. The mining caused subsidence. Flooding increased after the closure of the mine, as the site was no longer dewatered. The reserve continues to be protected from the sea by a seawall built by John Aird & Co. and completed in 1905.

== Habitats ==
Most of the area of the reserve is taken up by Hodbarrow Lagoon, a flooded part of the former mine, which is described as a "coastal lagoon". Some of the reserve is scrubland.

== Facilities ==
There is a car park on the Millom side of the reserve from which you can walk to the seawall. (Alternatively, there is more direct pedestrian access to the seawall from Haverigg).

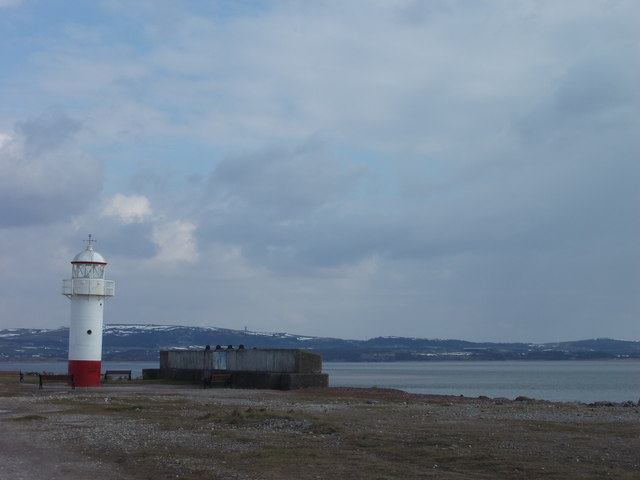
Lighthouse on the seawall with Duddon Estuary behind

A bird hide is located on the seawall which gives views of the lagoon.

== Protection status ==
The lagoon was originally a separate Site of Special Scientific Interest (SSSI), notified in 1983. Following an amalgamation of SSSIs, it is part of the Duddon Estuary SSSI. The Duddon estuary is also an Important Bird Area, and a Special Protection Area (Morecambe Bay and Duddon Estuary SPA).

== Birdlife ==
Hodbarrow has breeding populations of terns. It was one of the sites involved in a project funded by the LIFE programme called "LIFE on the edge improving the condition and long-term resilience of key coastal SPAs in S, E and N England". In the case of Hodbarrow, slag was moved to create a new island in the lagoon for the benefit of little, common and sandwich terns.

Hodbarrow is also renowned for large numbers of wildfowl during the winter, especially teal, wigeon, coot, mallard, tufted duck, common pochard, goldeneye, red-breasted merganser, and occasionally long-tailed duck, eider, goosander, pintail and shoveler.
