= Old Town Hall, Millom =

Municipal building in Millom, Cumbria, England

Old Town Hall
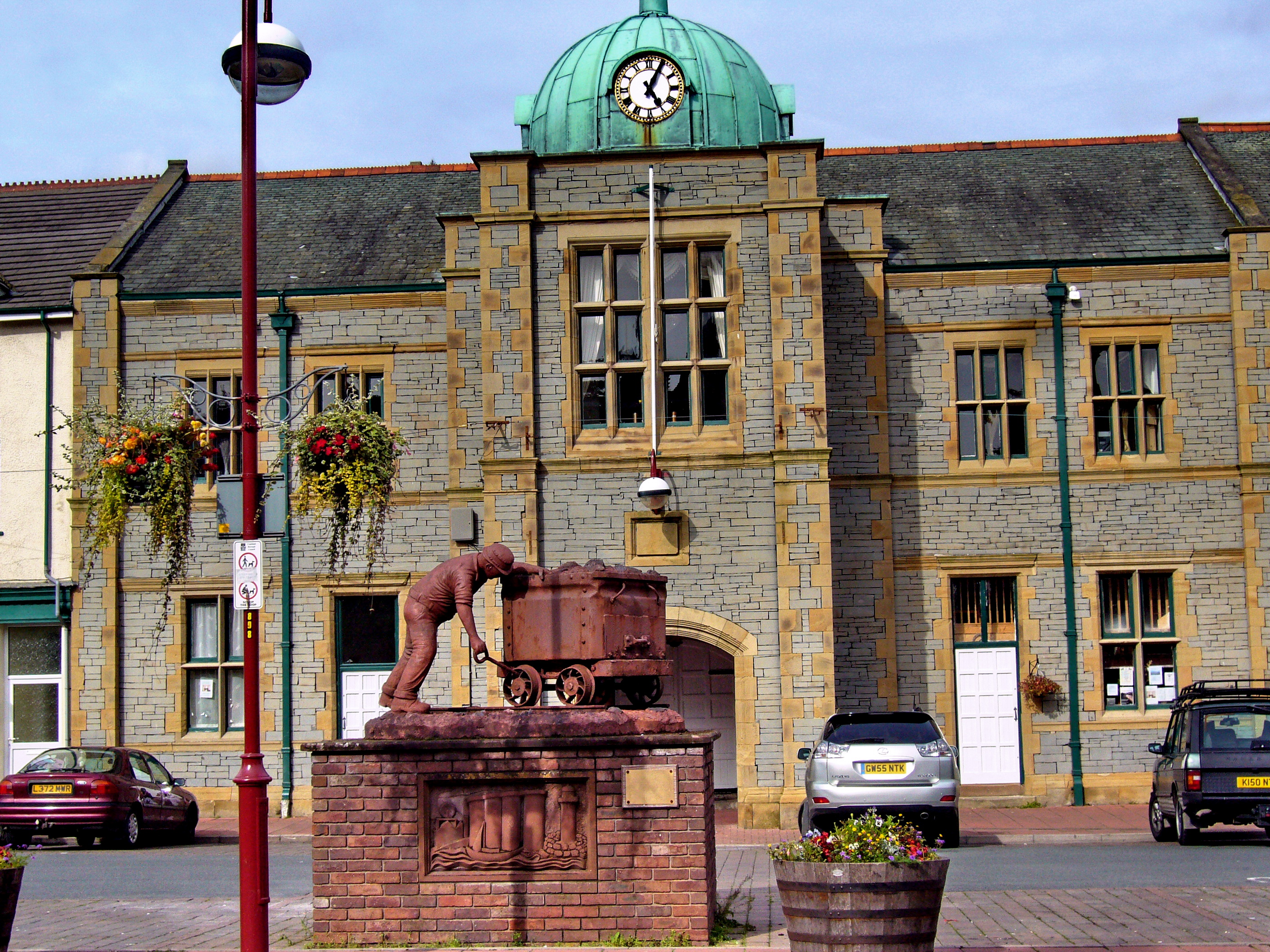
- The building in 2008

- Shown in Cumbria
- 54.2098°N 3.2698°W
- Location: Market Square, Millom

History
- Built: 1879

Site notes
- Architectural style: Tudor Revival style

The Old Town Hall, also known as the Market House, is a former municipal building in the Market Square, Millom, a town in Cumbria, England. The building currently accommodates a bar and restaurant known as the "Clock Tower".

== History ==
The building was commissioned by the Millom Local Board and Urban Sanitary Authority, with a budget of £3,500, to accommodate a boardroom and a market hall, in 1878. The site they selected was a prominent location on the northeast side of the Market Square.

The building was designed in the Tudor Revival style, built in limestone with sandstone dressings and was completed in 1879. The design involved a symmetrical main frontage of five bays facing onto the Market Square. The central bay featured a three-stage tower, which was projected forward. The tower involved a porte-cochère in the first stage, a twelve-pane mullioned and transomed window in the second stage, and two lancet windows in the third stage, all surmounted by a hexagonal section with clock faces, a dome and a lantern. There was a doorway in the bay to the left of the tower, and single sash windows in the other bays on the ground floor. On the first floor, the wings were fenestrated by six-pane mullioned and transomed windows.

The local board was succeeded by Millom Urban District Council, which continued to use the building as its meeting place, in 1894. The urban district council was absorbed into Millom Rural District Council, which also continued to use the building as its meeting place, in 1934. By the 1940s, the ground floor was "a busy covered market with around 20 stalls selling sweets, ice cream, eggs, meat and vegetables." The clock tower was substantially reduced in height, with both the third stage of the tower and the hexagonal section removed due to structural issues, in the 1950s.

The building ceased to be the local seat of government when the enlarged Copeland District Council was formed in 1974. A sculpture by a former miner, Colin Telfer, entitled The Scutcher, was cast from resin and iron ore dust and installed outside the town hall, to commemorate the town's industrial past, in around 2000. The council, which had been using the building for the delivery of local services, decided in 2001 that the building was surplus to requirements and sold it for commercial use. The building subsequently accommodated a nightclub named the "Clock Tower" until 2016, when it was put up for auction with a starting price of £95,000. It subsequently became a bar and restaurant operating under the same name. A programme of restoration works to the clock, undertaken with funding from local donations and managed by a newly formed entity, the Millom Clock Trust, was completed in December 2016.
