= Millom Without =

Civil parish in Cumbria, England

Coordinates: 54°15′N 03°15′W

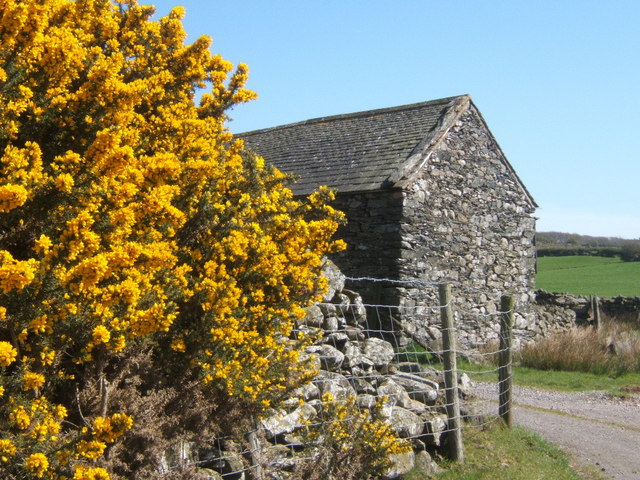

- Location within Cumbria
- Population: 859 (2011 census)
- Civil parish: Millom Without
- Unitary authority: Cumberland
- Ceremonial county: Cumbria
- Region: North West
- Country: England
- Sovereign state: United Kingdom
- Police: Cumbria
- Fire: Cumbria
- Ambulance: North West

Millom Without is a civil parish in the county of Cumbria, England. It had a population of 1,638 in 2001, decreasing to 859 at the 2011 Census. Millom Without forms part of the Cumberland district; the largest settlement in the parish is The Green.

The area was historically part of the parish of Millom. Parishes which straddled district boundaries were split under the Local Government Act 1894. The town of Millom itself was an urban district, and so a new parish was created for the parts of the old Millom parish outside the urban district. The new parish was initially called "Millom Rural", but was renamed "Millom Without" in 1934.

== Governance ==
An electoral ward in the same name exists. This ward stretches north-east to Ulpha with a total population as at the 2011 census of 1,369. From 1974 to 2023 it was in Copeland district.

== See also ==
- Listed buildings in Millom Without
