= Norman Nicholson =

English poet from Cumbria (1914–1987)

Norman Nicholson

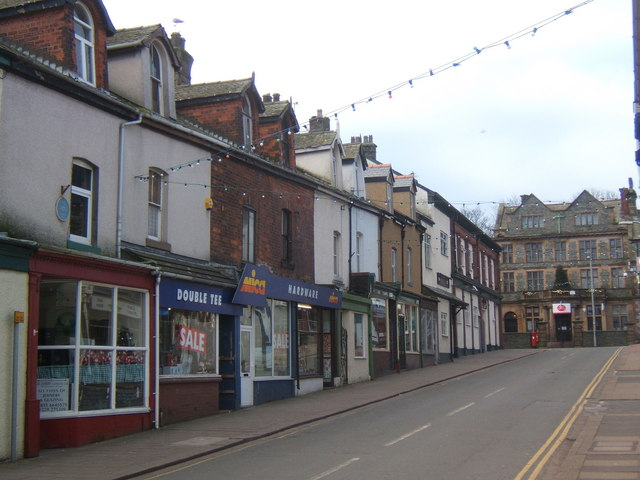
Nicholson's home (left) in St George's Terrace, Millom

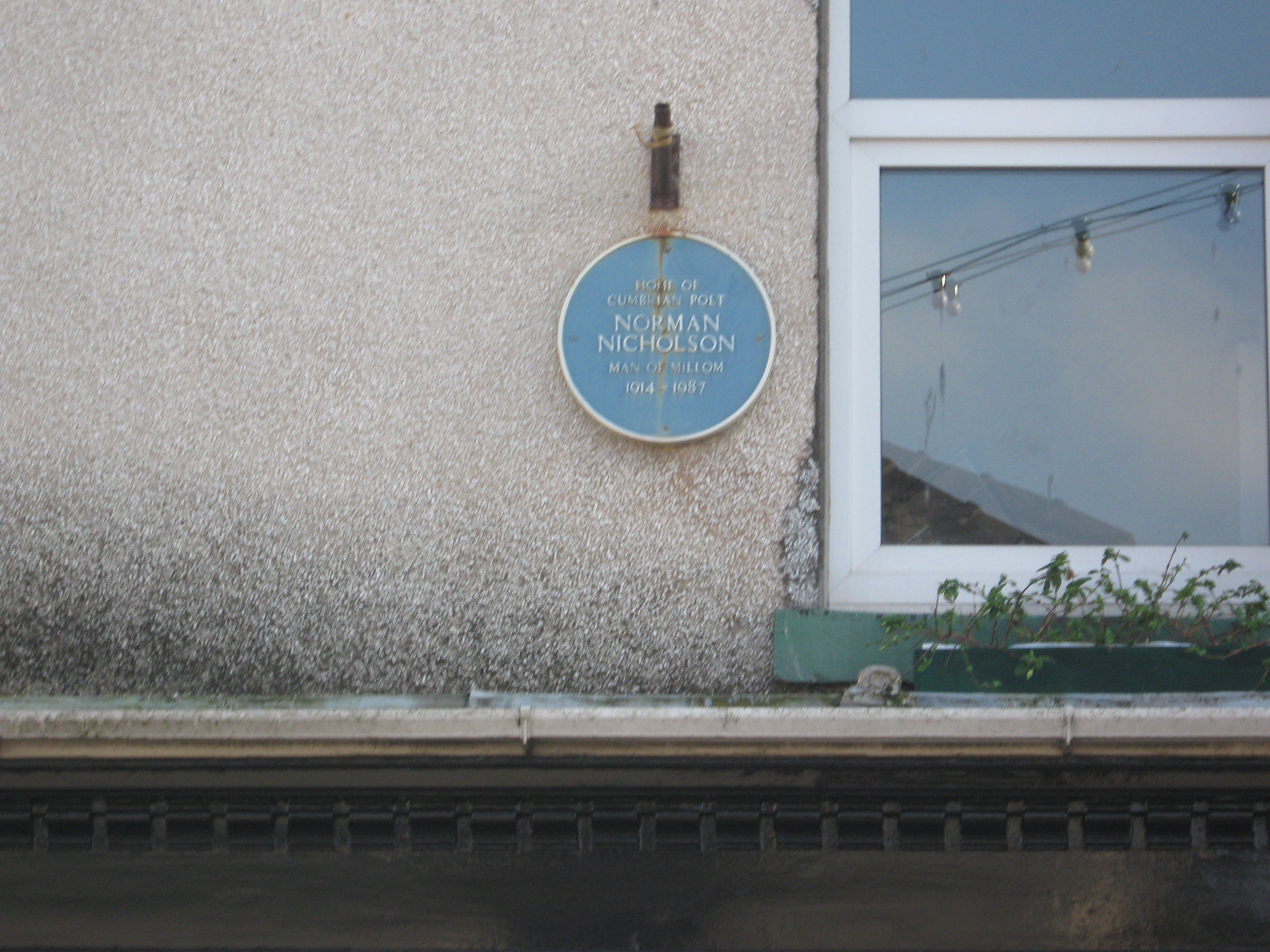
Nicholson's blue plaque in Millom

Norman Cornthwaite Nicholson OBE (8 January 1914 – 30 May 1987) was an English writer. Although he is now known chiefly for his poetry, Nicholson also wrote in many other forms: novels, plays, essays, topography and criticism.

== Biography ==
Nicholson was born on 8 January 1914 at 14 St George's Terrace in the industrial town of Millom, to Joseph and Edith Maud Mary Nicholson (nee Cornthwaite). His father was a gentleman's outfitter who worked out of his own home.

Nicholson was educated at Holborn Hill School and Millom Secondary School, but his education was interrupted at the age of 16 after he contracted tuberculosis. He then spent two years at a sanatorium in Linford, Hampshire. Although he had been regarded as one of the most brilliant school students in Cumberland his poor health prevented him from attending university and instead he devoted his life to writing.

Nicholson was influenced by the social and religious community around the local Wesleyan Methodist chapel in Millom. He was confirmed in 1940 into the Church of England.

In 1956 he married Yvonne Edith Gardner (d. 31 August 1982), a teacher who had consulted him about a school production of his play The Old Man of the Mountains. They travelled extensively in England, Scotland and Norway. They had no children.

Norman Nicholson died on 30 May 1987 in Whitehaven and was buried in St George's Churchyard, Millom.

== Writings ==
Nicholson's writing career stretched from the 1930s until his death in 1987. He was published by T. S. Eliot at Faber and Faber and by Robert Hale. His poetry collections include Rock Face (1948), The Pot Geranium (1954), A Local Habitation (1972), and Sea to the West (1981). He was elected to the Royal Society of Literature in 1945. He received altogether five honorary higher degrees from British universities; one of Britain's top poetry awards, the Queen's Gold Medal for Poetry in 1977; and was appointed an Officer of the Order of the British Empire (OBE) in the 1981 Birthday Honours. He reviewed frequently for the TLS, the Church Times, The Listener and many other magazines and gave numerous talks on the BBC. He also travelled widely around the UK to give poetry readings.

Some of the poems in Five Rivers foreshadow verse plays of his – The Old Man of the Mountains (1946), A Match for the Devil (1955) and Birth by Drowning (1960) – placing the Bible in a distinctly Cumbrian setting. A fourth, Prophesy to the Wind (1947) is about survival after nuclear disaster.

As a poet Nicholson is not generally associated with any of the 20th-century movements. Like Charles Causley, he stood outside the mainstream of poetic trends. Nonetheless, he acknowledged a debt to W. H. Auden and the way he had "turned to the industrial scene." His descriptive poetry can be remarkably vivid:

Above the collar of crags,
The granite pate breaks bare to the sky
Through a tonsure of bracken and bilberry.
(From "Eskdale Granite")

Nicholson's Lake District comprises not only the National Park but also the industrial coastal towns of Millom, Egremont, Whitehaven, Bootle and Askam. His admirers included T. S. Eliot, Ted Hughes, and Seamus Heaney, who wrote in a poem of tribute:

...those Cumbrian phonetics
cracked like a plaited whip
until the slack, nostalgic
ambler in me trotted

on the paved margin
of my own black pool —
Dublin black pool, dubh linn
...that is yours and mine as well

Aspects of Nicholson include his social awareness as a champion of the working class and the environment. As a young man he worked as a lecturer for the Workers' Educational Association. He was intensely interested in geology and botany and his poem "Windscale" about the catastrophic nuclear accident in 1957 has become something of an environmentalists' anthem.

The toadstool towers infest the shore:
Stink-horns that propagate and spore
Wherever the wind blows.
Scafell looks down from the bracken band
And sees hell in a grain of sand,
And feels the canker itch between his toes.

This is a land where dirt is clean
And poison pasture, quick and green,
And storm sky, bright and bare;
Where sewers flow with milk, and meat
is carved up for the fire to eat,
And children suffocate in God's fresh air.

Nicholson was the subject of a South Bank Show television broadcast in the United Kingdom on 4 November 1984.

== Partial bibliography ==
- Man and Literature (criticism, 1943)
- Five Rivers (poetry, 1944)
- The Fire of the Lord (novel, 1944)
- Old Man of the Mountains (verse drama, 1946)
- The Green Shore (novel, 1947)
- Rock Face (poetry, 1948)
- Cumberland and Westmorland (topography, 1949)
- Prophesy to the Wind (verse drama, 1950)
- H. G. Wells (criticism, 1950)
- William Cowper (criticism, 1951)
- The Pot Geranium (poetry, 1954)
- The Lakers (topography, 1955)
- A Match for the Devil (verse drama, 1955)
- Provincial Pleasures (novel, 1959)
- Birth by Drowning (verse drama, 1960)
- Portrait of the Lakes (topography, 1963)
- Selected Poems (poetry, 1966)
- No Star on the Way Back (poetry, 1967)
- Greater Lakeland (topography, 1969)
- A Local Habitation (poetry, 1972)
- Stitch and Stone (1975)
- Wednesday Early Closing (memoirs, 1975)
- The Lake District (anthology, 1978)
- The Shadow of Black Combe (poetry, 1978)
- Sea to the West (poetry, 1981)
- Selected Poems 1940-1982 (poetry, 1982)
- Norman Nicholson's Lakeland (anthology ed. Irvine Hunt, 1991)
- Collected Poems (ed. Neil Curry, 1994)

== Legacy ==
The John Rylands Library, Manchester, and Cumbria Library Service have bronze busts of Nicholson by Joan Palmer. A memorial stained-glass window created by Christine Boyce can be found in St George's Church, Millom and there is a bust of Nicholson in Carlisle Cathedral.

=== Archive ===
Nicholson's papers are in the John Rylands Library, Manchester

=== Exhibition ===
Millom Heritage and Arts Centre, formerly Millom Discovery Centre, houses information about Norman Nicholson.

=== Library ===
Nicholson's personal collection of published poetry was acquired by the John Rylands Library, Manchester, from his family.

=== Norman Nicholson House ===
Norman Nicholson's home at 14 St George's Terrace is now owned by the Norman Nicholson House CIC, which bought it in February 2024. There are plans to renovate the house and provide a museum, cafe and outreach centre. There is a commemorative blue plaque on the front of the building.

=== Norman Nicholson Society ===
This literary society was inaugurated in Millom on 31 March 2006, to celebrate Nicholson's work and to promote it as widely as possible. Lord Melvyn Bragg is the Honorary President. The NNS aims to encourage appreciation and academic research of Nicholson and to encourage republication of any of his works that are currently out of print. Talks (both online and in person), festivals, academic symposia and other events are arranged throughout the year. The newsletter Comet, published and distributed free to members, contains articles on Nicholson's life and work and original material from members. Contributors have included David Cooper, Neil Curry, U. A. Fanthorpe, Harry Whalley and Matt Simpson. Contributions relevant to Nicholson's life and work are invited by the editor, Antoinette Fawcett. Members of the NNS also receive regular online news bulletins.

== Sources ==
- Norman Nicholson: The Whispering Poet, a biography by Royal Literary Fund Fellow Kathleen Jones, The Book Mill, 2013, ISBN 9780957433243
- Norman Nicholson at 100 Essays and Memoirs on his Centenary, Edited by Stephen Matthews and Neil Curry, Bookcase, Carlisle, 2014 ISBN 978190414779-4
- Norman Nicholson, A Literary Life David Boyd, Seascale Press, 2015, ISBN 978-0-9928261-0-9
- Norman Nicholson, Philip Gardner, Twayne's English Authors Series, Twayne, New York, 1973, ISBN 0-8057-1418-9
