= St George's Church, Millom =

Coordinates: 54.2088°N 3.2718°W

St George's Church
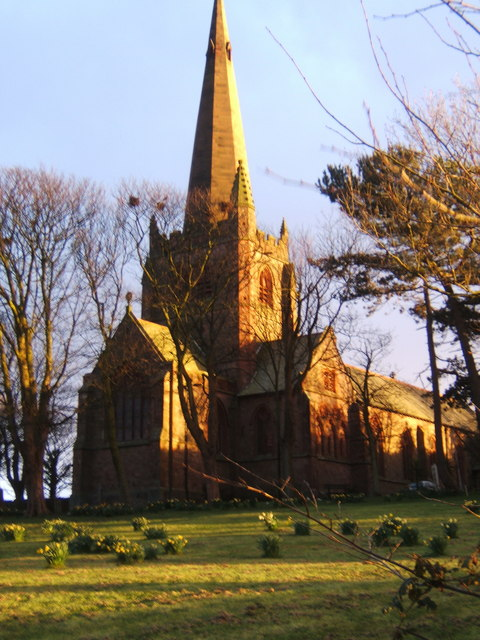
- St George's Church, Millom, from the northeast

- Location in Copeland Borough Location in Cumbria
- OS grid reference: SD 172,800
- Location: Millom, Cumbria
- Country: England
- Denomination: Anglican
- Website: St George, Millom

History
- Status: Parish church

Architecture
- Functional status: Active
- Heritage designation: Grade II
- Designated: 8 September 1967
- Architect: Paley and Austin
- Architectural type: Church
- Style: Gothic Revival
- Groundbreaking: 1874
- Completed: 1877

Specifications
- Materials: Sandstone, slate roofs

Administration
- Province: York
- Diocese: Carlisle
- Archdeaconry: Westmorland and Furness
- Deanery: Furness
- Parish: Millom

Clergy
- Vicar: Revd Malcolm Cowan

St George's Church is in the town of Millom, Cumbria, England. It is an active Anglican parish church in the deanery of Furness, the archdeaconry of Westmoreland and Furness, and the diocese of Carlisle. Its benefice is united with those of St Anne, Thwaites, Holy Trinity, Millom, and St Luke, Haverigg. The church is recorded in the National Heritage List for England as a designated Grade II listed building. It is a prominent landmark in the town.

== History ==
The church was built between 1874 and 1877 to serve the growing town of Millom. It was designed by the Lancaster architects Paley and Austin. The church cost about £12,000 (equivalent to £520,000 in 2025), of which £7,186 was given by the Millom Ironworks. The site for the church was given by the Earl of Lonsdale.

== Architecture ==
=== Exterior ===
St George's is constructed in red sandstone with ashlar dressings, and has slate roofs. Its plan is "markedly asymmetrical", and consists of a four-bay nave with a north aisle, a central tower with a transept to the north, a south vestry, and a chancel. The nave and the aisle have two-light windows on the sides and three-light windows at the east ends. At the west end, the nave has a five-light window, and the aisle a two-light window. All the windows contain Geometrical-type tracery. The tower has gabled angle buttresses, a stair turret to the northeast, two two-light windows on the south side, pairs of louvred two-light bell openings, and an embattled parapet with pinnacles. It is surmounted by an octagonal spire with lucarnes. The chancel has a five-light east window and three-light windows on each side. It is surmounted by a traceried parapet and has a cross on its gable.

=== Interior ===
All the fittings were designed by Paley and Austin, other than the lectern. The east window and the window on the north side of the chancel (the latter dated 1911), are by Heaton, Butler and Bayne; the window on the south side, dated 1906, is by Seward and Company. On the north side of the church is a memorial window to Norman Nicholson, a local poet who died in 1987. It was designed by Christine Boyce, inserted in 2000, and includes depictions of a bee orchid, a bloody cranesbill, Halley's Comet, and quotations from Nicholson's work. The original organ was built in about 1877 by Alfred Kirkland. It was replaced in 1972 with an organ by Keates that was moved from Morley. There is a ring of six bells, all cast by John Warner & Sons; the oldest dates from 1876, and the other five from 1921.

== External features ==
Outside the church is a memorial to the Boer War dated 1905. It consists of a Celtic-type cross on a tall shaft in a square enclosure. The memorial is carved with a vine, and dragon eating its tail. It is a Grade II listed building.

== See also ==
- List of ecclesiastical works by Paley and Austin
