= Duddon Estuary =

Estuary and SSSI in the South Lakeland district of Cumbria, England

Designations

Ramsar Wetland
- Official name: Duddon Estuary
- Designated: 16 March 1998
- Reference no.: 938

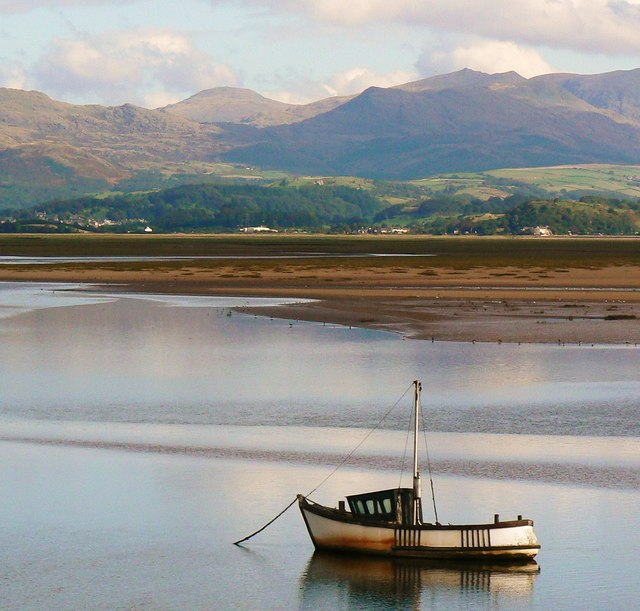
Boat in the Duddon estuary

The Duddon Estuary is the sandy, gritty estuary of the River Duddon that lies between Morecambe Bay and the North Lonsdale coast.

The River Duddon and its estuary form part of the boundary of the historic county of Lancashire.

It opens into the Irish Sea to the north of the Furness peninsula; Walney Island forming part of its southern edge. Its 28 miles (45 km) of shoreline enclose an area of 13 square miles (35 km^{2}), making it the second largest estuary in Cumbria after the Solway Firth and one of the six main estuaries in the historic county of Lancashire.

The main settlements alongside the Duddon estuary are Haverigg, Millom, Foxfield, Kirkby-in-Furness, Askam and Ireleth and Barrow-in-Furness.

== Biological importance ==
The estuary as a whole was designated as a Site of Special Scientific Interest (SSSI) in 1990 with the amalgamation of five previously separate SSSIs: Duddon Sands, Sandscale Haws, North Walney, Hodbarrow Lagoon and Haverigg Haws. It is a Ramsar site.

=== Fauna ===
The Duddon Estuary is significant for natterjack toads. It supports one fifth of the national population of the rare amphibian that is only found at 50 sites in the UK, of which five are in the Duddon Estuary.

==== Birds ====
The Duddon Estuary is an Important Bird Area. Species to be seen include pintail, red knot and common redshank with wintering waterfowl including common shelduck, red-breasted mergansers, Eurasian oystercatchers, ringed plover, dunlin and Eurasian curlew.

In 1998 it was designated a Special Protection Area (SPA) under the Birds Directive. It qualified under three criteria:

- regularly there are over 20,000 wintering waterfowl.
- breeding population of sandwich terns
- overwintering populations of knot, pintail and redshank; populations on passage of ringed plover and sanderling.

In 2015, before the United Kingdom European Union membership referendum, there were consultations on a successful proposal that Morecambe Bay and Duddon Estuary be combined in a new SPA. This would amalgamate the existing Morecambe Bay and Duddon Estuary SPAs and would add marine areas identified as being used by foraging terns.

=== Flora ===
The estuary is botanically rich with salt marsh, sand dune and shingle communities, including a nationally rare shingle vegetation community at Haverigg Haws and North Walney.

Shingle species include sea sandwort, spear-leaved orache, sea rocket and sea kale. All the dune grasslands at Sandscale Haws, Haverigg Haws and North Walney support a rich flora with the rare dune helleborine.

=== Threats ===
Development has had no significant effect on the nature conservation interest of the estuary, but it is at risk from coastal defence works, grazing by agricultural stock, sea level rise, recreational pressure and bait digging.
