= Millom =

Town in Cumbria, England

- Town and parish
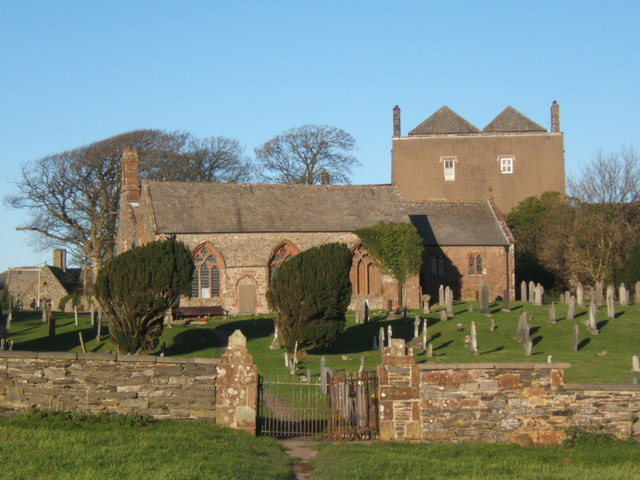
- Millom Castle and Holy Trinity Church

- Location within Cumbria
- Population: 7,240 (Parish, 2021); 5,690 (Built up area, 2021)
- OS grid reference: SD172802
- Civil parish: Millom
- Unitary authority: Cumberland
- Ceremonial county: Cumbria
- Region: North West
- Country: England
- Sovereign state: United Kingdom
- Post town: MILLOM
- Postcode district: LA18
- Dialling code: 01229
- Police: Cumbria
- Fire: Cumbria
- Ambulance: North West
- UK Parliament: Barrow and Furness

Millom is a town and civil parish on the north shore of the estuary of the River Duddon in southernmost Cumberland, Cumbria, England. It is situated just outside the Lake District National Park, about 6 miles (10 km) north of Barrow-in-Furness (23 miles or 37 kilometres by road) and 26 miles (42 km) south of Whitehaven.

Millom was a small village centred on Holy Trinity Church and Millom Castle until the 19th century. The modern town developed following the opening of Millom Ironworks in 1866. Built around the ironworks, the town subsumed the village of Holborn Hill and grew to a size of over 10,000 people by the 1960s, but has struggled since the works were closed in 1968. Culturally, Millom is notable as the birthplace of poet Norman Nicholson, and for its historical links with rugby league.

== History ==
In January 2023, six Bronze Age socketed axe heads at a site near Millom. The finds were featured in the BBC's Digging for Britain in January 2025.

The name Millom is derived from the plural form of the Old English myln meaning 'mill'.

Millom is mentioned in the Domesday Book of 1086 as one of the townships forming the Manor of Hougun which had been held by Tostig Godwinson, Earl of Northumbria.

Millom Castle is a grade I listed building and scheduled monument which by 1739 was in dilapidated condition.

In 1251 a market charter was granted by King Henry III of England to John de Huddleston, Lord of Millom.

Millom is the most southerly town in the historic county of Cumberland.

The Whitehaven & Furness Junction Railway opened a station in 1850, which was known as 'Holborn Hill Halt' until the new town of Millom was built in 1866. It was taken over by the Furness Railway in 1866.

A map of 1862 shows that there was a small hamlet by the name of Holborn Hill on the northwest side of the railway line. It had a railway station, an inn and a tile and brickworks. By 1899 the small town of Millom had grown up, with terraced streets on either side of the railway, a public library, police station, banks, hotels, school, market square and allotments.

In the intervening years, the Hodbarrow iron mines began extracting haematite from deposits between the village of Holborn Hill and the seashore at Hodbarrow. The first shafts were sunk in the 1850s and by 1881 there were seven pits operated by the Hodbarrow Mining Company. Millom & Askam Iron Company built Millom Ironworks and the first furnaces were completed in 1866. The opening of the ironworks led to the building of the new town of Millom . The Hodbarrow Outer Barrier, the third seawall to be built to protect the mines from the sea, was completed in 1905 . It took five years to construct at a cost of almost £600,000. The Hodbarrow Mines and Millom Ironworks were closed in 1968. The town's population of 10,997 in 1967 fell to 7,101 by the 1971 census.

In 1877 the expanding town needed more water and Whicham Beck was dammed at Baystone Bank (54.261226,-3.274237) to form Baystone Bank Reservoir. The reservoir remained in use until about 1996. It was drained in 2011, the dam removed and the valley returned to its original form. This work was carried out by water network company United Utilities.

During the Second World War an airfield, RAF Millom, was developed on flat coastal land at Haverigg. This was an advanced flying training station, mainly for Observers and also Air Gunners. Aircraft stationed there were firstly the Blackburn Botha and Fairey Battle, then the more popular and successful Avro Anson. Post-war this became the site of HM Prison Haverigg.

Throughout its history the town has struggled with socio-economic problems, once being described by the Mayor of Copeland as 'a place of despair'.

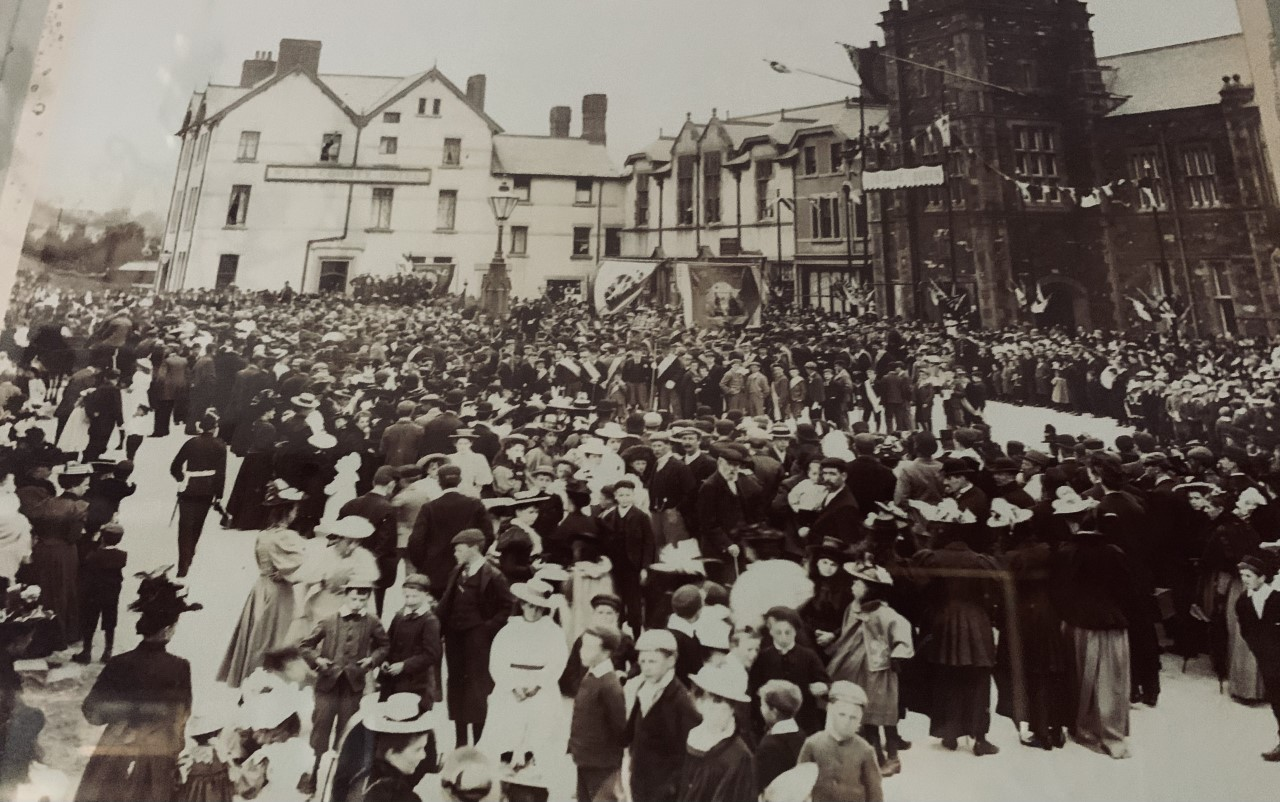
Millom Market Square - c.1900

Millom & District Local History Society was formed at a public meeting held on 4 February 1972.

== Governance ==
There are two tiers of local government covering Millom, at civil parish (town) and unitary authority level: Millom Town Council and Cumberland Council. The town council is based at 6 Newton Street.

Millom is within the Barrow and Furness UK Parliamentary constituency; Michelle Scrogham of the Labour Party is the Member of Parliament.

=== Administrative history ===
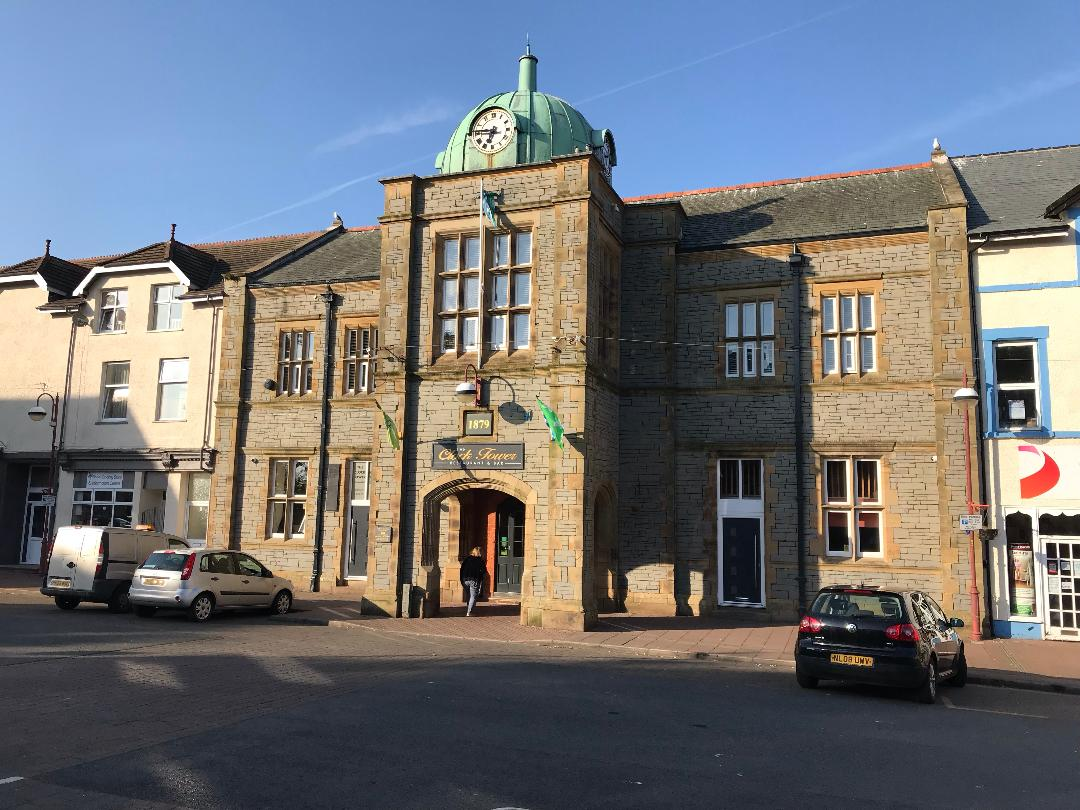
The Old Town Hall

Millom was an ancient parish, which formed part of Cumberland from the county's creation in the 12th century. The parish covered a large area. It included Kirksanton and Haverigg and the adjoining coast at its southern end, and also continued northwards up the west side of the Duddon Valley and over Birker Fell to reach the south bank of the River Esk in Eskdale. The parish was subdivided into six townships: Birker and Austhwaite, Chapel Sucken, Millom Above, Millom Below, Thwaites, and Ulpha.

From the 17th century onwards, parishes were gradually given various civil functions under the poor laws, in addition to their original ecclesiastical functions. In some cases, including Millom, the civil functions were exercised by subdivisions of the parish rather than the parish as a whole. The parish was subdivided into three parts for administering the poor laws: the township of Birker and Austhwaite, the township of Ulpha, and the rest of the parish. In 1866, the legal definition of 'parish' was changed to be the areas used for administering the poor laws, and so Birker and Austhwaite, Millom, and Ulpha became separate civil parishes.

As the modern town began to develop from the 1860s following the opening of the ironworks, there was a need for more modern forms of local government. A Millom local government district was established in 1875, just covering the area around the growing new town. The district was administered by an elected local board, which built the Town Hall in Market Square in 1879 to serve as its headquarters.

Local government districts were reconstituted as urban districts under the Local Government Act 1894. The 1894 Act also directed that civil parishes could no longer straddle district boundaries, and so the part of Millom parish outside the urban district was made a separate parish called Millom Rural (renamed Millom Without in 1934). Millom Urban District was abolished in 1934, with Millom instead being given a parish council and reclassified as a rural parish within the wider Millom Rural District. Millom Rural District was abolished in 1974, becoming part of the Borough of Copeland in the new county of Cumbria. Copeland was in turn abolished in 2023 when the new Cumberland Council was created, also taking over the functions of the abolished Cumbria County Council in the area.

== Economy ==
Millom's economy is now mainly based around retail, services and tourism. It is a relatively low wage area, with a lot of people employed in skilled trades such as building, painting and decorating. Many also work in the service sector in hotels, pubs and shops within the nearby Lake District National Park. Higher wage centres are Barrow-in-Furness to the south and Sellafield to the north-west with commuting each way on the road or via the railway.

The prison at Haverigg, two miles (three kilometres) away is a large employer.

Millom was granted the status of a Fairtrade town in 2004.

== Culture and community ==
Millom Palladium is a theatre, bar and full multi-functional venue. Completed in 1911, it has stood on the site for over 100 years. This building and entertainments venue is home to Millom Amateur Operatic Society (MAOS), founded in 1909, and is currently an ongoing project run and managed by a registered charity and group of volunteers with hopes to reinstate the cinema facility within the building.

The Beggar's Theatre is a multi-function arts base with several activities, performing-arts based, for local talent and provides a venue for touring theatres, stand-up comedians etc.

== Norman Nicholson Society ==
The Norman Nicholson Society promotes and explores the work of the town's most famous son, the poet and writer Norman Nicholson, who spent his whole life in the town.

== Landmarks ==
St. George's Church stands within the town on a small hill and with its steeple is the biggest landmark of the town, being visible from many miles away.

The area's bigger landmark is the significant hill of Black Combe standing 1,970 feet (600 m) above sea level. It forms a grand panoramic viewing platform of the south-western Lake District and also offers views of England, Scotland, Ireland and Wales on a clear day.

Millom Heritage and Arts Centre (formerly Millom Discovery Centre and Millom Folk Museum) at Millom railway station presents a snapshot of past times in Millom, paying particular attention to the historical development of the area brought about by the significant iron ore mining and iron works.

Millom Rock Park is situated high on the north rim of the nearby Ghyll Scaur Quarry in the parish of Millom Without. A viewpoint in the Rock Park permits views into the working quarry and overlooks the processing machinery. There is an avenue of 15 large rock specimens with detailed interpretation panels.

There are two nature reserves near the town, both of which are located on the Duddon Estuary; an internationally important area for wildlife and designated a Site of Special Scientific Interest (SSSI). Hodbarrow Nature Reserve is owned by the RSPB and is located to the south of the town, which in October 2005, saw the unveiling of its new public aid, with logos produced by local artists Stuart Edwards and Holly Parminter. Millom Iron Works Local Nature Reserve is located to the east of the town. Both reserves are important for tern species and a number of wading birds and waterfowl. Hodbarrow is renowned for large numbers of wildfowl during the winter. Various birds of prey can be seen hunting on both reserves throughout the year.

RAF Millom Museum closed in 2010.

=== Lighthouses ===
Hodbarrow Beacon
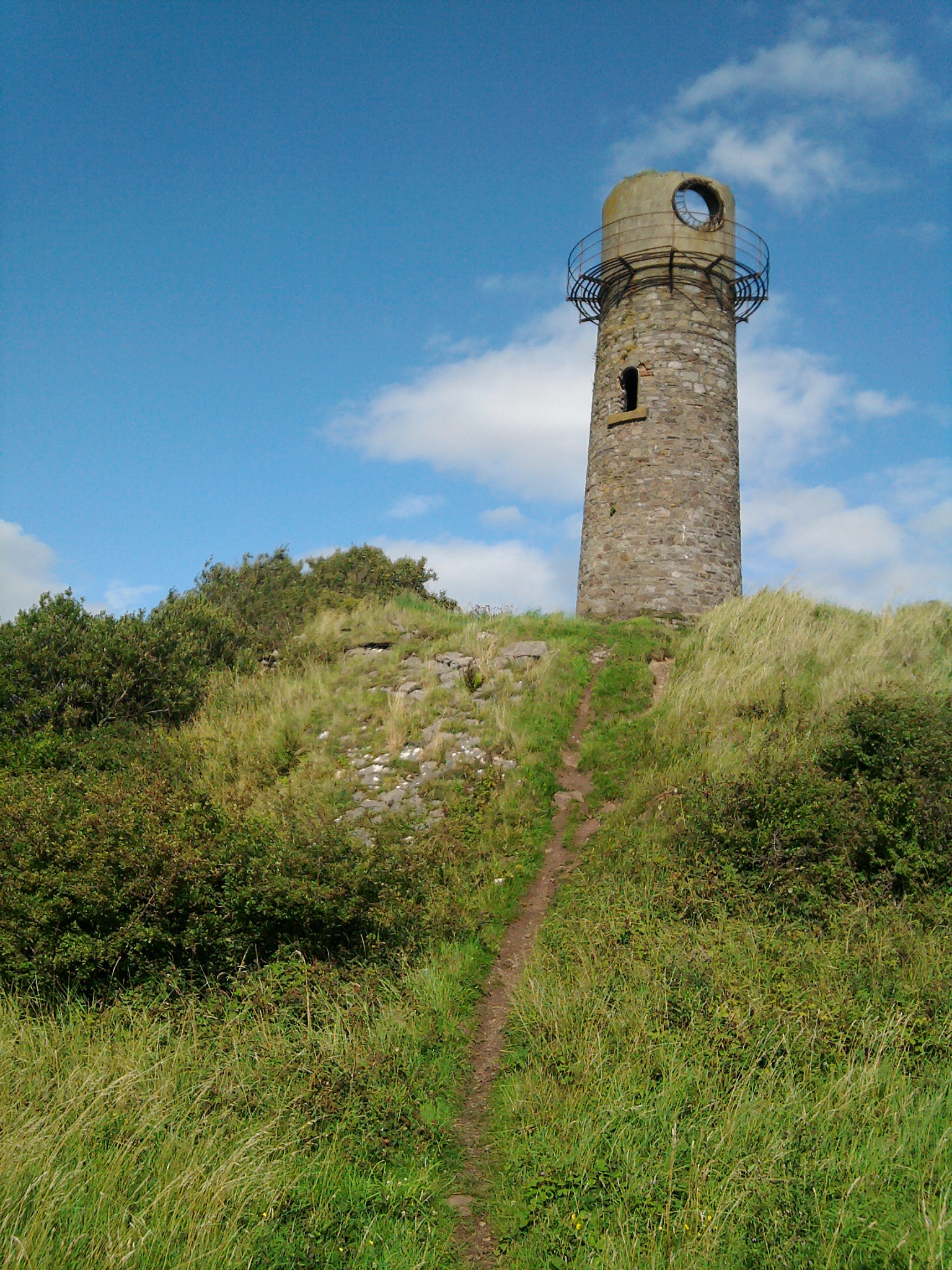
- The older of two lighthouses at Hodbarrow
- Location: Millom, United Kingdom
- OS grid: SD1800078326
- Coordinates: 54°11′39″N 3°15′30″W

Tower
- Constructed: 1866
- Construction: stone
- Height: 18 m (59 ft)
- Shape: cylindrical tower with balcony and embattled top, light from a window
- Markings: Unpainted
- Operator: Haverigg Lighthouse Club
- Heritage: scheduled monument

Light
- Deactivated: 1905
- Hodbarrow Point Lighthouse
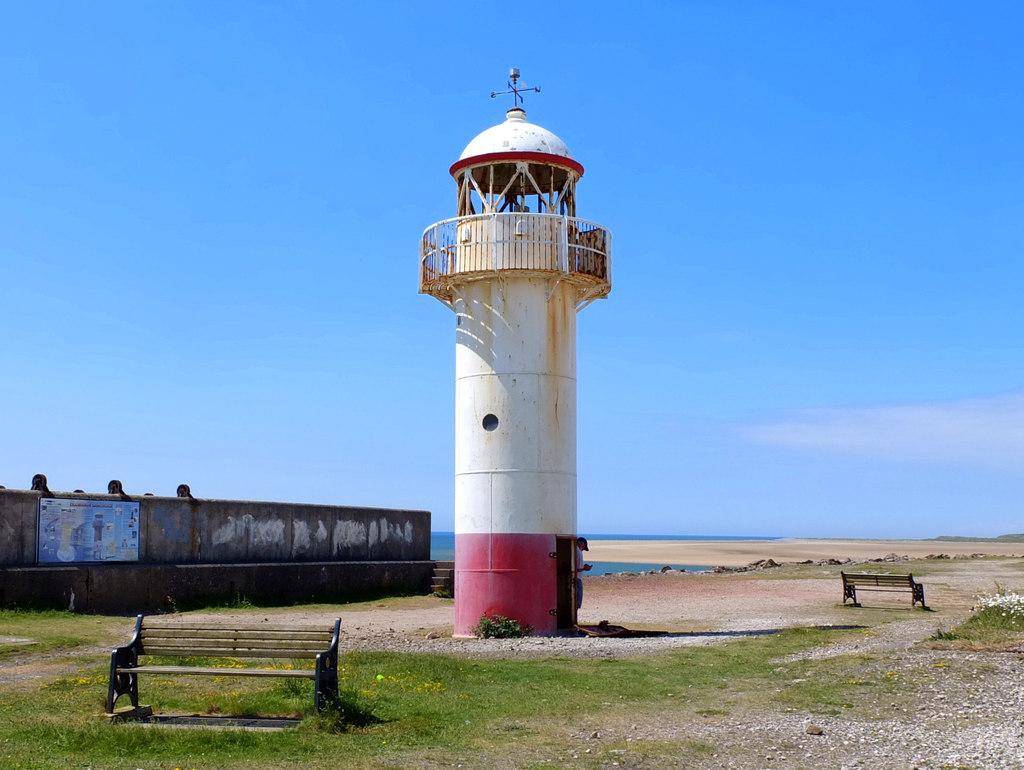
- Constructed: 1905
- Construction: cast iron (tower)
- Height: 9 m (30 ft)
- Shape: cylindrical tower with balcony and lantern
- Markings: White (tower), white (lantern), red (horizontal stripe)
- Operator: Hodbarrow Mining Company (–1946), Hodbarrow RSPB reserve
- Deactivated: 1949
- Focal height: 12 m (39 ft)
- Characteristic: Fl W 4s

In 1866 the Hodbarrow Mining Company built a lighthouse on Hodbarrow Point to guide ships to its dock. When the company built a seawall in 1905 to protect its mineworkings, it established a new lighthouse on the wall and abandoned the old one. Both structures still stand. In 2004 the newer lighthouse (which had itself been abandoned in 1949) was refurbished as part of a local community initiative. At the time a new solar-powered light was placed in the lantern which used to operate at night, but by 2016 it was no longer functioning.

== Transport ==
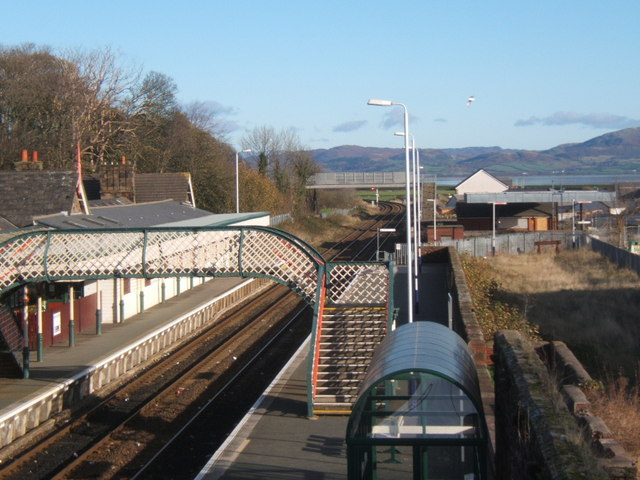
Millom railway station

Millom is served by Millom railway station on the Cumbrian Coast Line.

As of March 2026, Stagecoach run bus services to Barrow-in-Furness and Whitehaven.

The A5093 road goes through the town and is itself a loop off of the A595. The town council supports the building of a road bridge across the Duddon estuary between Millom and the Furness peninsula.

== Media ==
Local news and television programmes are provided by BBC North West and ITV Granada. Television signals are received from the Winter Hill and the local relay TV transmitters.

Local radio stations are BBC Radio Cumbria, Heart North West and CandoFM, a community based station.

The town is served by the local newspaper, North West Evening Mail.

== Education ==
Millom School is a secondary school and sixth form, it includes the adult education centre, an all-weather sports pitch and the "Melvyn Bragg Drama Studio" which was opened in 2005. At one time it had a swimming pool, however this was subsequently demolished by Cumbria County Council.

There are a number of other schools in the town including;

- Millom Infants School,
- The Nursery,
- St James' Catholic Primary School,
- Black Combe Junior School, which was built in the early 1970s; its first headmaster, Frank Eccles, died 1 January 2013 aged 89.

== Health ==
Primary health care is provided at the town's community hospital. It also provides some clinics, physiotherapy, podiatry and has a small x-ray facility. The in-patients occupy one ward spanning a six- (now five-) bed bay, a four-bed bay, twin and single rooms. The hospital does not offer A+E service nor any other 'drop-in' healthcare services. The nearest A+E (Accident and Emergency) service is at Furness General Hospital 23 miles (37 kilometres) away by road at Barrow-in-Furness.

== Religious sites ==
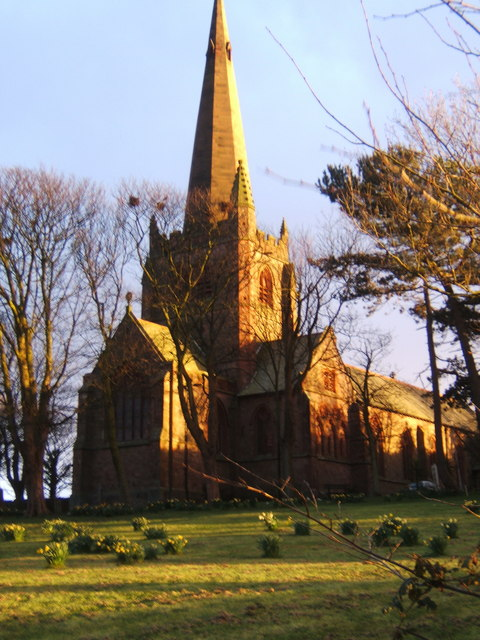
St George's Church, Millom

Millom's original parish church is Holy Trinity, a grade I listed building dating to the 12th century. In 1877 the growth of the town required the building of another church and architects Paley and Austin were commissioned to build St George's, a Grade II Listed building. It contains an impressive memorial window to Norman Nicholson by the stained-glass artist Christine Boyce. There are also Roman Catholic, Baptist and Methodist churches and a community church. Jehovah's Witnesses also have a Kingdom Hall in the town.

== Sport ==
Millom Recreation Centre comprises a large sports hall and a small multi-gym and caters for a wide range of different sports. Millom has a Crown green bowling club, tennis and cricket are also played in the town.

Millom Rugby League Club is the oldest existing amateur rugby league club in the world having been founded in 1873.

Millom has a Rugby Union club which was formed in 1873, making it one of the oldest rugby clubs in England.

== Notable people ==
- John A. Agnew, British-American political geographer.
- Professor John T Andrews, (Born in Millom 1937, educated Millom School, played for the U-19 English Schools Rugby team in 1955 and 1956) University of Colorado Boulder, Fellow American Geophysical Union, Fellow American Association Science. Penrose Medal 2016 Geological Society of America.
- Norman Nicholson, poet and author, whose work was published by T. S. Eliot at Faber and Faber, spent his entire life in Millom. He is commemorated by a blue plaque on his house at 14 St George's Terrace.
- Jimmy Settle, English international footballer, was born in Millom in 1874.

== See also ==
- Listed buildings in Millom
- Millom Without
- Category:People from Millom
- Millom Rural District
