= Millom Castle =

Castle in Cumbria, England

Coordinates: 54.2210°N 3.2725°W

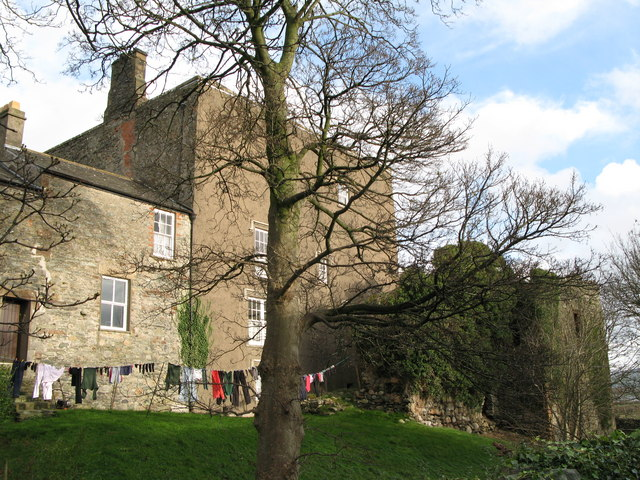
Millom Castle

Millom Castle is an ancient building at Millom in Cumbria. It is a Grade I listed building and scheduled ancient monument.

== History ==
A manor on the site was granted to Godard de Boyvill, owner of the Manor of Millom, in around 1134. The manor came into the Hudleston family's ownership in around 1240 when de Boyvill's granddaughter married into the Hudleston family. John Hudleston was given a licence to crenellate in 1335. The great tower dates from the 16th or perhaps 17th century.

The Hudlestones took an active part in England's regional warfare. In the Wars of the Roses, Sir John Hudlestone fought on the Yorkist side, being present at the Battle of Blore Heath in 1459, and also the Battle of Bosworth Field in 1485. In 1460 Millom Castle was captured by Lancastrian forces. After the accession of Henry VII, Sir John and his son Henry secured a pardon and retained the estate. In the English Civil War of the 1600s, Sir William Hudlestone was a leading Royalist colonel in Cumberland and Lancashire. He was defeated by Parliamentarian forces, and Millom Castle damaged by cannon fire in 1644. Heavy fines exacted by victorious Parliament began the slide of the Hudlestons into debt.

By 1739 the castle walls were in dilapidated condition. In 1748, Elizabeth Huddleston sold the castle to Sir James Lowther of Whitehaven. The gatepiers were added in the 17th or 18th century. The great tower is now used as a farmhouse.

A 3D explorable scan of the castle that includes parts of the castle off limits to the public due to safety restrictions has been produced. The Millom & District Local History Society has written papers on the Castle and on an Archaeological Survey completed in 2024.

== Architecture ==
The stone building has ashlar dressings and slate roofs. The east side has a gatehouse and 17th-century steps. The west side has a pointed entrance. Various barns and outhouses have been attached to the north and west sides. It has the remains of a moat to the north and west.

== See also ==
- Grade I listed buildings in Cumbria
- Listed buildings in Millom
