= Haverigg =

Village in Cumbria, England

Coordinates: 54.19715°N 3.28906°W

- Village
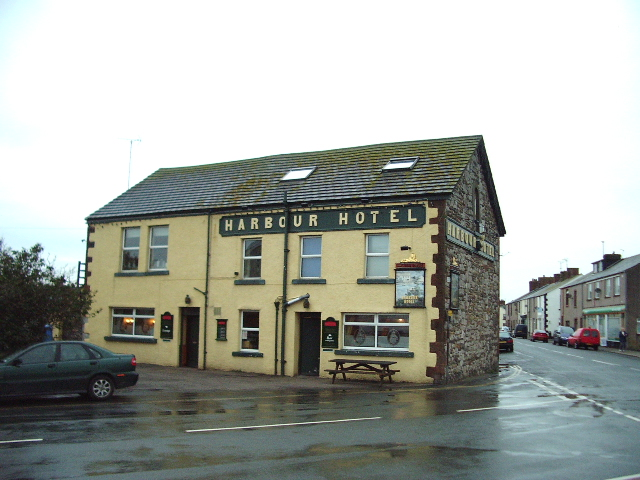
- The Harbour Hotel, Haverigg

- Location in the former Copeland Borough Location within Cumbria
- Population: 1,546 (2021.Ward)
- OS grid reference: SD160787
- Civil parish: Millom
- Unitary authority: Cumberland
- Ceremonial county: Cumbria
- Region: North West
- Country: England
- Sovereign state: United Kingdom
- Post town: Millom
- Postcode district: LA18
- Dialling code: 01229
- Police: Cumbria
- Fire: Cumbria
- Ambulance: North West
- UK Parliament: Barrow and Furness

Haverigg is a village on the south-west coast of Cumbria, England, historically part of the county of Cumberland. In 2001 it had a population of 1,791 in 548 households, increasing in 2011 to a population of 1,849 in 549 Households.

The name Haverigg derives from Old Norse and can be translated as "the hill where oats are grown".

Haverigg is at the mouth of the Duddon Estuary, a protected area important for birds and other wildlife. Haverigg has an extensive, quiet Blue Flag beach. There is also access to a seawall with a lighthouse which protects Hodbarrow Lagoon, part of Hodbarrow RSPB Reserve. The River Lazy flows through Haverigg and joins the estuary of the River Duddon here.

Haverigg is 31.9 miles (51.3 km) to the south of Whitehaven, 24.4 miles (39.3 km) to the north of Barrow-in-Furness (by road via the estuary) and 1.3 miles (2.1 km) to the west of Millom.

An independent lifeboat station, Haverigg Inshore Rescue Team, has been based in the village since 1973 assisting those in difficulty around the Duddon coastline.

In 2020, the Lakes first Aqua Park opened in Haverigg, situated on the lagoon, it features an inflatable obstacle course plus other attractions.

== Governance ==
Haverigg is in the parliamentary constituency of Barrow and Furness.

For Local Government purposes it is administered as part of the Cumberland unitary authority.

The village does not have its own Parish Council; instead the Haverigg Ward is governed by Millom Town Council.

== Haverigg Prison ==
The village is home to the Category D Haverigg Prison, a low security prison for males from all over the North of England.

== Gallery ==
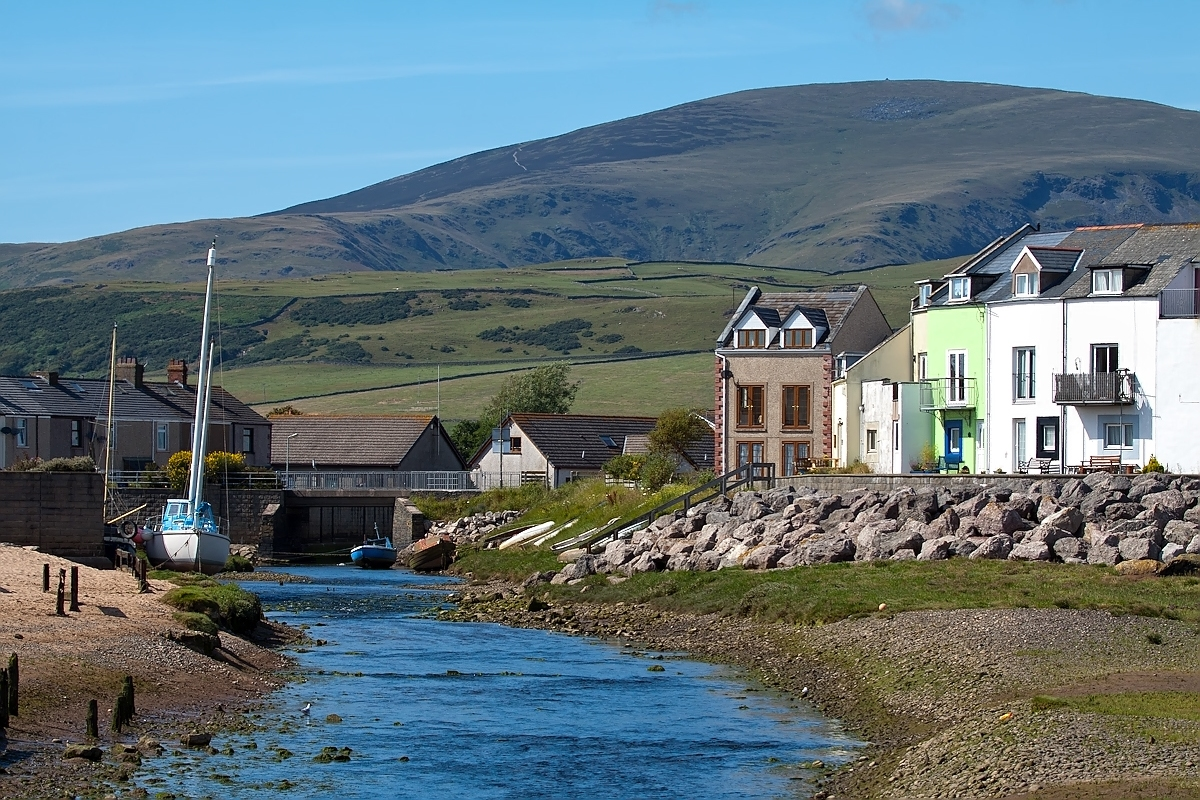
Haverigg Pool

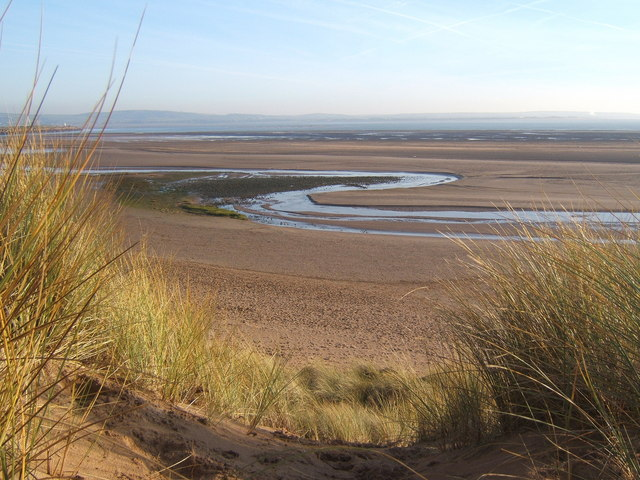
Duddon sands

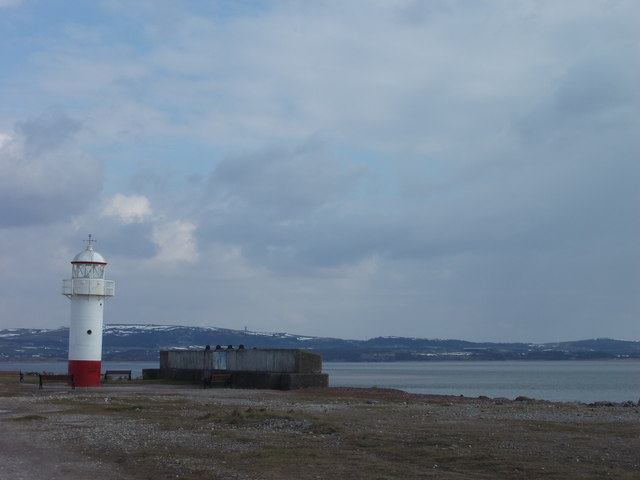
Duddon Estuary and restored lighthouse

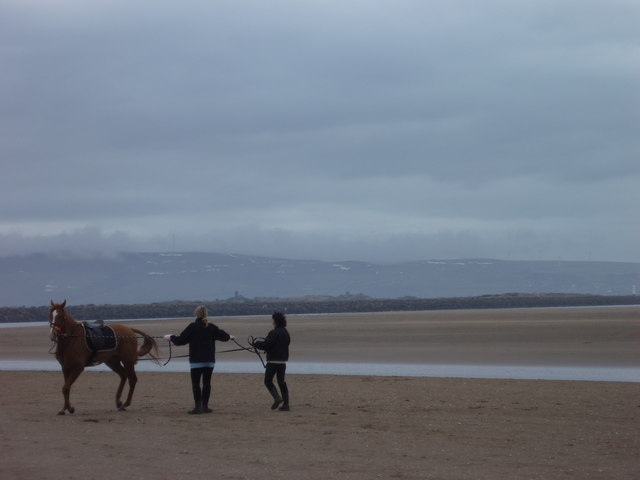
Horses on the beach
