= Broughton Mills =

Village in Cumbria, England

Coordinates: 54.30°N 03.20°W

- Hamlet
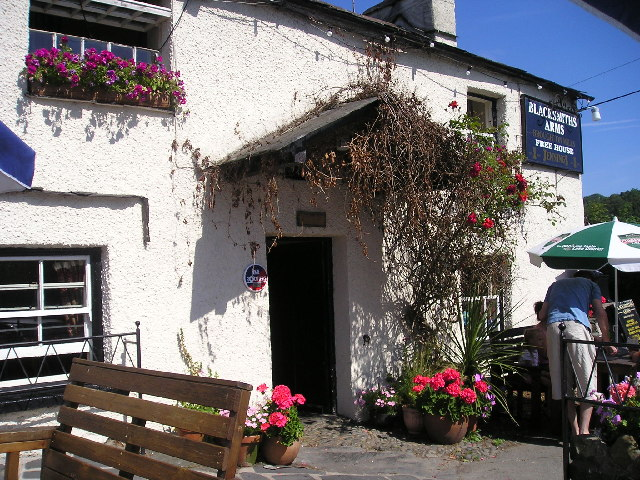
- The Blacksmiths Arms, Broughton Mills

- Location in South Lakeland Location within Cumbria
- OS grid reference: SD2290
- Civil parish: Broughton West; Dunnerdale-with-Seathwaite
- Unitary authority: Westmorland and Furness
- Ceremonial county: Cumbria
- Region: North West
- Country: England
- Sovereign state: United Kingdom
- Post town: BROUGHTON-IN-FURNESS
- Postcode district: LA20
- Dialling code: 01229
- Police: Cumbria
- Fire: Cumbria
- Ambulance: North West
- UK Parliament: Barrow and Furness

Broughton Mills is a village in Cumbria, England, located 2 miles (3.2 km) from the larger town of Broughton-in-Furness. The village consists of about 40 households, a phonebox (non-functional), church and a pub called the Blacksmiths Arms.

== History ==
Broughton Mills was formerly the place where the people of Broughton-in-Furness came to grind their corn, saw their timber, weave their cloth, malt their barley and burn lime. There was formerly a wool mill which later became a bobbin mill, a corn mill and a flax mill built along the River Lickle along with quarries, mines, bloomeries, charcoal burners, joiner's shop and a smithy, hatter, weaver and clogger.

== See also ==
- Listed buildings in Broughton West
- Listed buildings in Dunnerdale-with-Seathwaite
