= Listed buildings in Ulpha =

Ulpha is a civil parish in the Cumberland district, Cumbria, England. It contains six listed buildings that are recorded in the National Heritage List for England. Of these, one is listed at Grade II*, the middle of the three grades, and the others are at Grade II, the lowest grade. The parish is in the Lake District National Park, it contains the settlement of Ulpha and is otherwise sparsely populated, and consists mainly of moorland and mountain. The listed buildings stretch along the valley of the River Duddon, and comprise a church, a sundial in the churchyard, two bridges, a farmhouse and barn, and a house.

== Key ==
Grade	Criteria
II*	Particularly important buildings of more than special interest
II	Buildings of national importance and special interest

== Buildings ==
Name and location	Photograph	Date	Notes	Grade
Loganbeck and barn 54.30320°N 3.25682°W	—	17th century	The farmhouse and barn, which was added later, are in stone with quoins, and have slate roofs with stone ridges. The house has two storeys and three bays, with a single-bay extension to the left. On the front is a gabled porch and casement windows. The barn has a wagon door, and a lean-to and window to the right.	II
St John's Church; 54.32848°N 3.23469°W		17th century (probable)	The church is rendered and has a slate roof with stone copings. It is a small church in a single cell, with a west porch, and a bellcote on the west gable. The east window dates probably from the 17th century, and the others were inserted later. Inside the church are the remains of 17th to 18th-century wall paintings.	II*
Bridge, Old Coach Road; 54.31646°N 3.24785°W		18th century or earlier	The bridge carries a former coach road over Blea Beck. It is in Lakeland stone, and consists of a single segmental arch. The bridge has voussoirs, a parapet with flat copings, and near-parallel abutments. At the south end are flagstones set vertically acting as terminal piers.	II
Birks Bridge; 54.38383°N 3.18069°W		18th century (probable)	The bridge carries over a small ravine carrying the River Duddon. It is in stone, and consists of a single segmental arch with voussoirs, and is 2.5 metres (8 ft 2 in) wide.	II
Sundial; 54.32862°N 3.23481°W	—	1761	The sundial is in the churchyard of St John's Church. It is in sandstone and consists of a shaft with moulded edges, carrying a square block about 1.5 feet (0.46 m) high. On the block is a later octagonal inscribed brass plate with a gnomon.	II
Holme Cottage; 54.32247°N 3.24531°W		Early to mid 19th century (probable)	A house in pebbledashed stone on a plinth, with rusticated pilasters, an eaves band, a moulded cast iron gutter, and a hipped slate roof. There are two storeys and a symmetrical front of three bays. In the centre is a doorway with a fanlight and a cornice. The windows are sashes in stuccoed surrounds.	II
