= Listed buildings in Broughton West =

Broughton West is a civil parish in the Westmorland and Furness district of Cumbria, England. It contains 39 listed buildings that are recorded in the National Heritage List for England. Of these, two are listed at Grade II*, the middle of the three grades, and the others are at Grade II, the lowest grade. The parish contains the market town of Broughton-in-Furness and a number of small villages and settlements, including Broughton Mills, but is otherwise rural. Many of the listed buildings are located in Broughton-in-Furness, and the others are scattered around the parish. Most of the listed buildings are country houses, smaller houses and associated structures, and farmhouses and farm buildings. The other listed buildings include a church and items in the churchyard, bridges, public houses, a former market hall, a commemorative obelisk, stocks, a limekiln and market benches.

== Key ==
Grade	Criteria
II*	Particularly important buildings of more than special interest
II	Buildings of national importance and special interest

== Buildings ==
Name and location	Photograph	Date	Notes	Grade
St Mary Magdalene's Church; 54.27596°N 3.21570°W		12th century	The oldest part of the church is the south doorway, and the present south aisle was originally the nave of the earlier chapel of ease. The present nave was built in 1873–74 by Paley and Austin, and the tower was replaced in 1900–01 by Austin and Paley. The church is built in stone with bands, and has slate roofs with coped gables. The church consists of a nave and a chancel in a single vessel, and a southwest tower. The south doorway is in Norman style, and the east window of the aisle is Perpendicular.	II
Sundial; 54.27573°N 3.21561°W	—	Medieval (probable)	The sundial is in the churchyard of St Mary Magdalene's Church, and the base is probably the stump of a medieval churchyard cross. On this base, and from a later date, are a chamfered square base and a roughly octagonal shaft, with a brass plate and gnomon on the top.	II
Broughton Tower; 54.28082°N 3.20874°W		14th century	A country house, later used as a school and then converted into flats, it originated as a pele tower. The house was extended in 1744, wrapping round three sides of the tower, and Gothic features were added in 1777. The house was further extended in 1838–41 by George Webster, and outer towers were added in 1882–83. The house is built in stone with quoins, a coped embattled parapet, and slate roofs. The main front has two storeys, a basement, and eight bays. The projecting porch has an embattled parapet, an ogee-shaped head, clustered shafts, pinnacles, and a fleuron. The outer bays also project forward as towers, the right tower also having a circular corner turret. In the centre, at the rear, is the former three-storey pele tower, acting as a belvedere.	II*
Angerton Farmhouse and barn 54.24892°N 3.20892°W	—	17th century (probable)	The farmhouse and barn are in stone with slate roof. The house is roughcast with two storeys and two bays. The windows vary; one has a chamfered surround and a timber lintel, and another is mullioned, and some have hood moulds. On the north front is a gabled porch. The barn dates from the 19th century and has various openings.	II
Black Cock Inn; 54.27728°N 3.21189°W		17th century (probable)	The public house is in roughcast stone and has a slate roof, two storeys and five bays. The windows are sashes with plaster surrounds. There are three doorways, the middle doorway having paired doors and a former loading door above, now converted into a window.	II
Town End Farmhouse and outbuilding 54.32144°N 3.13918°W	—	17th century (probable)	A ruined farmhouse and outbuilding in stone and with the remains of a slate roof. The house has a single storey and two bays, windows with stone lintels, and a blocked fire window. The outbuilding has two storeys, various openings, some of which are blocked, and a pitching hole.	II
Syke House and Syke House Cottage; 54.27769°N 3.21587°W	—	1655	A pair of roughcast houses with two storeys and a slate roof. Each house has two bays. Above the doorway of the house, which is to the right, is a dated and inscribed panel, including details of the rebuilding of the house in 1740. Most of the windows are sashes, and there is a casement window in the upper floor of the cottage.	II
Lower Bleansley; 54.29145°N 3.21970°W	—	1666	A roughcast farmhouse with a slate roof, two storeys and five bays. The first two bays have been converted from an outbuilding, and the third bay is an extension. The windows in the fourth and fifth bays are mullioned, in the third bay they are casements, and in the first two bays they are 20th-century replacements. On the front is a gabled porch incorporating a datestone, and at the rear are a gabled wing and a lean-to outshut.	II
Sand Gap Farmhouse; 54.26328°N 3.21566°W	—	Late 17th century	The farmhouse is in roughcast stone with a slate roof. It has three storeys and an attic, and three bays with a two-storey extension to the west. Most of the windows are casements, and there are two three-light mullioned windows.	II
Lane End Farmhouse and barn 54.29976°N 3.20113°W	—	1694	The farmhouse and barn are in stone, and the farmhouse is roughcast. The house has two storeys, two bays, sash windows, and a fire window. Above the door is a datestone, and the barn is at right angles on the right.	II
Lane End Cottage and barn 54.29967°N 3.20098°W	—	Late 17th or early 18th century (probable)	A roughcast stone house with a slate roof, two storeys and two bays. The windows are casements. The outbuilding to the southwest has a small window and an entrance.	II
Lumholme and barn 54.30275°N 3.20197°W	—	Late 17th or early 18th century	The house and outbuildings are in stone, partly roughcast, with slate roofs, and form an L-shaped plan. The house has three storeys and three bays, with a two-storey single-bay extension to the right, one arm of a barn to the left, and a gabled wing at the rear. Some of the windows are mullioned, and others are casements. The long range of outbuildings extends at right angles and includes various openings including doorways, pitching holes, and a cart entrance.	II
Blacksmith's Arms public house 54.30434°N 3.19694°W		1748	The public house is in roughcast stone with a slate roof, two storeys and four bays. Most of the windows are sashes, and above the doorway is a slate gabled canopy under which is a datestone. In front of the right bay is a five-step mounting block. At the rear is a gabled wing and an outshut with a catslide roof, and in the right wall is a Victorian post box.	II
Broughton House; 54.27726°N 3.21246°W		18th century	A pebbledashed house with stuccoed quoins and window surrounds, and a slate roof. There are three storeys and three bays, and a rear gabled wing. The windows are sashes, and the doorway has a Doric doorcase.	II
Gates and gate posts north of Broughton Tower; 54.28141°N 3.20826°W	—	18th century (probable)	The gate piers flanking the entrance to the drive are square and in ashlar stone. Each pier has paired Tuscan angle pilasters, bands, a cornice and four pinnacles. The pair of cast iron gates have spear finials.	II
Cobblers Cottage; 54.27746°N 3.21218°W	—	18th century	A roughcast house with a slate roof, two storeys and two bays. In the ground floor is a bow window with a frieze and a cornice on the left, and a fixed shop window on the right. The windows in the upper floor are sashes, and between them is a re-used datestone. Between the ground floor windows is a doorway, and there is another door with a fanlight to the right. (Note: Street View in August 2011 shows that the name on the building reads "Deelers Cottage", and that it does not appear to be in use as a shop.)	II
Cottage and farm buildings opposite Syke House; 54.27769°N 3.21587°W	—	18th century (probable)	The buildings are in stone with a slate roof and have an irregular plan. The cottage has two storeys and two bays. To the left the farm buildings consist of a lower two-storey bay and two projecting gabled wings further to the left. Steps lead up to the entrance in the first floor of the outbuilding.	II
Crag Cottage; 54.30400°N 3.19761°W	—	18th century (probable)	A roughcast stone house with two storeys and three bays. In the first bay is an outhouse, and the entrance is between the second and third bays. Most of the windows are fixed, and there is a horizontally-sliding sash window at the rear.	II
Hawk Bridge; 54.31742°N 3.17117°W		18th century (probable)	The bridge carries a road over Appletree Worth Beck. It is in stone and consists of a single segmental arch with thin voussoirs and iron railings on the parapets.	II
Low Rosthwaite Farmhouse; 54.30017°N 3.16920°W	—	18th century	A roughcast farmhouse with a slate roof, it has two storeys, three bays, and a lean-to outshut at the rear. The ground floor windows are casements, one of which has a mullion, and the windows in the upper floor are sashes.	II
Old King's Head Public House; 54.27691°N 3.21261°W		Mid 18th century (probable)	The public house is in roughcast stone and has a slate roof. There are two storeys, five bays, and outshuts at the rear. Most of the windows are sashes, and above the doorway is a canopy on brackets.	II
Shop Bridge and boundary stone 54.30612°N 3.19666°W		18th century (possible)	The bridge carries a road over the River Lickle. It is in stone, and consists of a single segmental arch with thin voussoirs and low parapets. The roadway is about 3.5 metres (11 ft) wide. The boundary stone marks the boundary between the parishes of Broughton and Dunnerdale, and is inscribed with the names of the parishes.	II
Water Yeat Bridge; 54.32717°N 3.17229°W		18th century (probable)	The bridge carries a road over the River Lickle. It is in stone, and consists of a single broad segmental arch with thin voussoirs and iron parapet railings.	II
1–5 The Square; 54.27742°N 3.21124°W	—	c. 1760	The terrace of five houses is on the south side of The Square. They are in roughcast stone with slate roofs, they have three storeys, and the three houses to the west also have basements. No. 5 has two bays, and the other houses have one bay each. Most of the windows are sashes, there are some casement windows, and at the rear are stair windows. In the right bay of No. 5 is a segmental-arched through passage.	II
Beswick's Restaurant and Café; 54.27761°N 3.21172°W	—	c. 1760	Originally a house, it is in roughcast stone and has a slate roof. There are three storeys with a basement, and two bays. The windows in the top floor are casements, and in the lower floors they are sashes. The central doorway has angle pilasters, a frieze and a cornice, and there is also a basement entrance. In front of the building are area railings.	II
Grovelands and adjoining house 54.27784°N 3.21185°W	—	c. 1760	A pair of roughcast houses with a common slate roof. The house on the left has three storeys, one bay, and casement windows. The house on the right has two storeys, two bays, a canted bay window on the right in the ground floor, and sash windows elsewhere.	II
Market Hall; 54.27754°N 3.21155°W		c. 1760	The market hall, later used for other purposes, is in roughcast stone and has a slate roof. There are two storeys and four bays. In the ground floor is an arcade of seven bays, now infilled, with round heads, square piers, plain capital blocks, and keystones. In the upper floor are pairs of round-headed windows with keystones and containing sashes. In the centre is a clock face in an architrave, and to the left is a lantern on a bracket. On the roof is a square bell turret with round arches, a pyramidal roof, a ball finial, and a weathervane surmounted by hunting figures.	II
Terrace of six houses 54.27801°N 3.21116°W	—	c. 1760	The terrace forms the north side of The Square. The houses are in roughcast stone, most with a cornice, and they have a slate roof. There are two storeys and each house has one or two bays. Most of the windows are sashes, and the others are casements. The second house has a central round-headed doorway with a reeded archivolt and a keystone. At the rear are stair windows, and in front of most of the houses are area railings.	II
Terrace of seven houses and Manor Arms public house 54.27768°N 3.21086°W		c. 1760	The terrace forms the east side of The Square. The houses and public house are in roughcast stone with a cornice, and have a slate roof. They have three storeys, most with basements, and there is a total of nine bays, the public house having two bays. Most of the windows are sashes, and at the rear are stair windows. The public house, at the right end, has canted bay windows in the ground floor, and between them is an elliptical-headed doorway with a fanlight and a lantern.	II
The Square Café, Hillside and Aitken House; 54.27806°N 3.21164°W	—	c. 1760	A row of three buildings on the west side of The Square, in roughcast stone and with a slate roof. The house on the right has three storeys and one bay, the house in the centre and the café on the left have two bays each and two storeys, and the café also has a basement. Steps lead up to the doorway in the café above which is a canopy, to the left is a casement window, and to the right is a canted bay window with a hipped roof; most of the other windows are sashes.	II
Hawes Farmhouse and outbuildings 54.30557°N 3.21003°W	—	Mid to late 18th century	The farmhouse and outbuildings are in roughcast stone with a slate roof. The house has two storeys and four bays, sash windows, and a door with a fanlight. The outbuildings to the right have three doorways, and at the rear is an outshut and a loft entrance.	II
Group of four tombs 54.27574°N 3.21552°W	—	Late 18th century	The tombs are in the churchyard of St Mary Magdalene's Church, and consist of two chest tombs and two table tombs. The chest tombs are inscribed with the names of people dying in the late 18th and the 19th centuries. The table tombs have balusters and moulded edges, but the inscriptions are illegible; one has a relief of a cherub and crossed bones.	II
Barn, Low Rosthwaite Farm; 54.29986°N 3.16918°W	—	1782	The barn is in stone with a slate roof. It has various entrances, ventilation slits, and a round-headed stone inscribed with initials and the date. On the right side are steps leading to a first floor entrance.	II
Atkinson Monument; 54.27564°N 3.21517°W	—	1805	The monument is in the churchyard of St Mary Magdalene's Church, and is in ashlar stone. It consists of a headstone with a triangular head containing a fluted fan. On the stone are inscriptions relating to members of the Atkinson family.	II
Obelisk and stocks 54.27779°N 3.21134°W		1810	The obelisk was built to commemorate the golden jubilee of George III. It has a moulded base, and stands on a square plinth on four square steps. On the southeast side is a brass plate. The stocks, which are of an uncertain date, consist of two round-headed posts with slots in the inner faces.	II*
Duddon Bridge; 54.28292°N 3.23147°W		18th century (probable)	The bridge carries the A595 road over the River Duddon. It is in stone, and consists of three segmental arches with triangular cutwaters on both sides. The bridge has thin voussoirs and a low plain parapet.	II
Gateway to Broughton Tower; 54.27830°N 3.21127°W		19th century (probable)	The entrance to the drive is flanked by square stone gate piers that have Tuscan angle pilasters and caps with ball finials. Outside these are canted stone walls with coping rising above central round arches. The gates are in cast iron and have decorative finials.	II
Limekiln; 54.30380°N 3.19830°W	—	19th century (probable)	The limekiln is constructed in slate and consists of a square structure built into a slope in the ground. The fire hole has a brick segmental arch.	II
Two market benches 54.27779°N 3.21143°W	—	Uncertain	The benches are parallel to each other in the Market Square adjacent to the obelisk. They are in stone, and consist of flat stones on flat upright stones.	II

== Notes and references ==
=== Sources ===
- Historic England, "Church of St Mary Magdalene, Broughton West (1086818)", National Heritage List for England
- Historic England, "Sundial approximately 13.5 metres to south of St Mary's Church, Broughton West (1086819)", National Heritage List for England
- Historic England, "Broughton Tower, Broughton West (1335949)", National Heritage List for England
- Historic England, "Angerton Farmhouse and barn, Broughton West (1138019)", National Heritage List for England
- Historic England, "Black Cock Inn, Broughton West (1138217)", National Heritage List for England
- Historic England, "Town End Farmhouse and outbuildings, Broughton West (1086851)", National Heritage List for England
- Historic England, "Syke House and Syke House Cottage, Broughton West (1086816)", National Heritage List for England
- Historic England, "Lower Bleansley, Broughton West (1086850)", National Heritage List for England
- Historic England, "Sand Gap Farmhouse, Broughton West (1335951)", National Heritage List for England
- Historic England, "Lane End Farmhouse and barn, Broughton West (1335974)", National Heritage List for England
- Historic England, "Lane End Cottage and barn, Broughton West (1086815)", National Heritage List for England
- Historic England, "Lumholme and adjoining barn, Broughton West (1086814)", National Heritage List for England
- Historic England, "Blacksmith's Arms public house, Broughton West (1335972)", National Heritage List for England
- Historic England, "Broughton House, Broughton West (1086821)", National Heritage List for England
- Historic England, "Gate and gate piers approx 67 metres to north of Broughton Tower, Broughton West (1312025)", National Heritage List for England
- Historic England, "Cobblers Cottage and Broughton Craft Shop, Broughton West (1138199)", National Heritage List for England
- Historic England, "Cottage and farm buildings opposite Syke House, Broughton West (1086817)", National Heritage List for England
- Historic England, "Crag Cottage, Broughton West (1086813)", National Heritage List for England
- Historic England, "Hawk Bridge, Broughton West (1312026)", National Heritage List for England
- Historic England, "Low Rosthwaite Farmhouse, Broughton West (1138051)", National Heritage List for England
- Historic England, "Old King's Head Public House, Broughton West (1138289)", National Heritage List for England
- Historic England, "Shop Bridge and boundary stone, Broughton West (1086852)", National Heritage List for England
- Historic England, "Water Yeat Bridge, Broughton West (1138062)", National Heritage List for England
- Historic England, "Nos. 1 to 5 The Square, Broughton West (1335976)", National Heritage List for England
- Historic England, "Beswick's Restaurant and Cafe, Broughton West (1086824)", National Heritage List for England
- Historic England, "Grovelands and adjoining house, Broughton West (1311933)", National Heritage List for England
- Historic England, "Market Hall, Broughton West (1138235)", National Heritage List for England
- Historic England, "Terrace of six houses, Broughton West (1086825)", National Heritage List for England
- Historic England, "Terrace of seven houses and Manor Arms public house, Broughton West (1311902)", National Heritage List for England
- Historic England, "The Square Cafe, Hillside and Aitken House, Broughton West (1335975)", National Heritage List for England
- Historic England, "Hawes Farmhouse and outbuildings, Broughton West (1086849)", National Heritage List for England
- Historic England, "Group of four tombs approximately 14 metres to South of St Mary's Church, Broughton West (1311974)", National Heritage List for England
- Historic England, "Barn opposite of Low Rosthwaite Farmhouse, Broughton West (1335950)", National Heritage List for England
- Historic England, "Atkinson Monument approximately 10.5 metres to south of St Mary's Church, Broughton West (1086820)", National Heritage List for England
- Historic England, "Duddon Bridge, Broughton West (1356555)", National Heritage List for England
- Historic England, "Obelisk and stocks, Broughton West (1086822)", National Heritage List for England
- Historic England, "Gateway to Broughton Tower, Broughton West (1138268)", National Heritage List for England
- Historic England, "Limekiln to south-west of Crag Cottage, Broughton West (1335973)", National Heritage List for England
- Historic England, "Two Market Benches to east of Obelisk, Broughton West (1086823)", National Heritage List for England
- Historic England, Listed Buildings
- Hyde, Matthew; Pevsner, Nikolaus (2010) [1967], Cumbria, The Buildings of England, New Haven and London: Yale University Press, ISBN 978-0-300-12663-1
