= Listed buildings in Dunnerdale-with-Seathwaite =

Dunnerdale-with-Seathwaite is a civil parish in the Westmorland and Furness district of Cumbria, England. It contains 19 listed buildings that are recorded in the National Heritage List for England. All the listed buildings are designated at Grade II, the lowest of the three grades, which is applied to "buildings of national importance and special interest". The parish is in the Lake District National Park, and is sparsely populated. It contains the settlements of Seathwaite, part of Ulpha, and Broughton Mills. The listed buildings include farmhouses, farm buildings, houses, bridges, potash kilns, a burial ground, a church, and a boundary stone.

== Buildings ==
Name and location	Photograph	Date	Notes
Farm building, Stephenson Ground; 54.32804°N 3.17665°W		16th century (possible)	Originally a dwelling, later a farm building, it is in stone with a stone-slate roof, and has a single storey. On the front are two doorways with slate lintels, and at the left end is a window. At the rear is a single door, and inside there is one disturbed cruck truss.
Low Whineray Ground Farmhouse and outbuildings 54.30303°N 3.22928°W	—	17th century or earlier	The buildings are in stone with quoins and a slate roof. The farmhouse has two storeys, initially three bays, later extended at the north end. Most windows are casements, with one sash window and an added 20th-century window. At the north end steps lead up to a loft door. The outbuildings adjoin the farmhouse to the south and have a total of four bays. They consist of a byre, an outshut containing an earth closet, steps leading to a loft door, and a cart shed.
Friends' Burial Ground; 54.33038°N 3.22580°W	—	17th century	The Friends' burial ground continued in use until the 19th century. It consists of a square stone enclosure about 15 metres (49 ft) square, with walls about 2 metres (6 ft 7 in) high. There is an entrance in the north wall, and on the inner faces of the walls are stone benches.
Scrithwaite Farmhouse, laundry and bank barns 54.31116°N 3.20074°W		17th century	The buildings are in stone with Westmorland slate roofs, and the front of the farmhouse range is rendered. The farmhouse range has two storeys, and contains doorways and sash windows. To the southwest is a small rectangular laundry with a curved side. To the west of this are two barns, one a threshing barn with a full-height cart entrance. The north barn has a single storey element, and a double-height barn with quoins and through stones.
Stickle House Barn; 54.30961°N 3.21007°W		17th century (probable)	This is a field barn in stone with a slate roof. In the east front are two entrances and blocked ventilation slits, and in the west front is a blocked entrance and a ventilation slit. The south gable end contains an owl hole, and inside the barn are two full cruck trusses.
Dale Head; 54.39571°N 3.16971°W		Late 17th century (probable)	A house that was extended in the 19th century, it is in stone. There are two storeys, the original part has two bays, and the higher extension to the left also has two bays. At the rear is an outshut, and the windows are a mix of sashes and casements.
Under Crag; 54.35986°N 3.18181°W	—	1714	A roughcast stone farmhouse with a slate roof. It has two storeys, three bays, a lean-to outshut to the left, and another at the rear. There is a central doorway, casement windows in the ground floor, sash windows above, and fixed small-paned windows at the rear.
Ulpha Bridge; 54.32654°N 3.23696°W		Late 17th or early 18th century (probable)	The bridge carries a road, Sella Brow, over the River Duddon. It is in stone and consists of three segmental arches. It has voussoirs and parapets with flat coping. On the north parapet is an inscribed stone and a boundary stone.
Birks Bridge; 54.38383°N 3.18069°W		18th century (probable)	The bridge carries a road over the River Duddon. It is in stone, and consists of a single segmental arch over a ravine. The bridge is 2.5 metres (8 ft 2 in) wide, it has voussoirs, and there are pipes in the parapets for drainage.
Potash kiln 54.32692°N 3.17288°W	—	18th century (probable)	The potash kiln is a round stone structure built into sloping ground. It has a rectangular fire hole, and inside is a shallow bowl.
Potash kiln 54.32210°N 3.17665°W	—	18th century (probable)	The potash kiln is stone. It consists of a round shallow bowl in a ruinous state, and it has a rectangular fire hole.
Rawfold Bridge; 54.29653°N 3.23709°W		18th century (probable)	The bridge carries a road over the River Duddon. It is in stone and consists of two rectangular arches, the eastern arch being the wider. The central pier stands on a rocky outcrop, and the bridge has voussoirs and straight parapets.
Seathwaite Bridge; 54.36122°N 3.18344°W		18th century (probable)	The bridge carries a road over Tarn Beck. It is in stone, and consists of two segmental arches, the arch to the west being smaller. The parapets were added later and contain an inscribed stone.
Dunnerdale Hall Farmhouse with byres 54.34941°N 3.20972°W	—	Mid to late 18th century (probable)	A byre was added to each end of the farmhouse in the 19th century. The building is in stone, the house is on a boulder plinth, the byres have quoins, and the whole has a slate roof. The house has two storeys, originally three bays, and it was later extended into a former one-bay cart shed. Most of the windows are casements, and there are some sash windows. Each byre has steps leading up to a hay-loft door.
Turner Hall; 54.35772°N 3.18148°W	—	Mid to late 18th century (probable)	A stone house with quoins and a slate roof. There are two storeys and a symmetrical front of three bays. In the centre is a porch, most of the windows are sashes, and there are two fixed windows at the rear.
Boundary stone (Three Shires Stone); 54.41501°N 3.11523°W		1816	The boundary stone stands at the meeting point of the historic counties of Lancashire, Cumberland and Westmorland, and was erected as a memorial. It consists of a pillar with a rectangular plan about 6 feet (1.8 m) high, and inscribed on one side with initials and the year, and on the other side with "LANCASHIRE".
Barn, byres and courtyard entrance, Hesketh Hall; 54.30717°N 3.19527°W	—	Late 18th to early 19th century (probable)	The buildings are in stone with quoins and slate roofs. The barn has two storeys and five bays. On the north side a ramp leads to a wagon entrance, and on the south side there is a winnowing door, three byre and stable doors, windows, and a slate canopy. A wall containing a wagon entrance links the barn to the house.
Hesketh Hall; 54.30699°N 3.19526°W	—	19th century (probable)	A stone house, partly slate-hung, with a slate roof. There are two storeys and a symmetrical front of three bays. There is a central doorway, and the windows are sashes. Above the door is a re-set dated and initialled panel.
Holy Trinity Church; 54.35490°N 3.18772°W		1874	The church is built in slate rubble and has a slate roof. It consists of a nave and chancel in a single cell, a south porch, and a north organ loft and vestry. On the west gable is a bellcote. The porch is gabled, and contains an entrance with a pointed arch, and a sundial. The windows are lancets, the east window being a stepped triple lancet.
