= Angerton, Westmorland and Furness =

Civil parish in Cumbria, England

Coordinates: 54.239°N 3.189°W

Angerton
- Civil parish
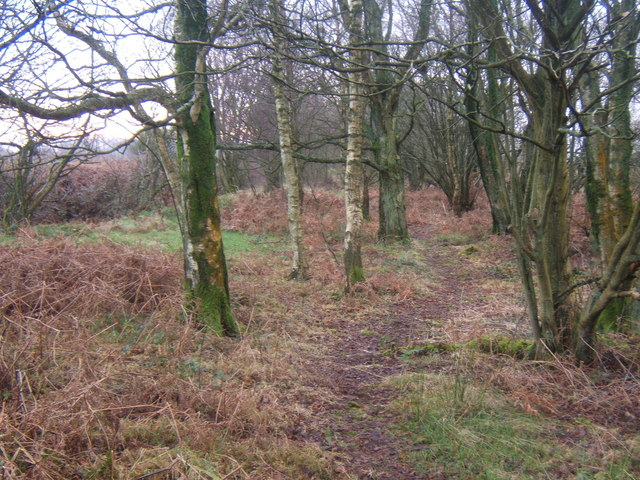
- Duddon Mosses

- Location within Cumbria
- Population: 25 (Parish, 2021)
- OS grid reference: NY2283
- Unitary authority: Westmorland and Furness
- Ceremonial county: Cumbria
- Region: North West
- Country: England
- Sovereign state: United Kingdom
- Post town: KIRKBY IN FURNESS
- Postcode district: LA17
- Dialling code: 01229
- Police: Cumbria
- Fire: Cumbria
- Ambulance: North West
- UK Parliament: Barrow and Furness

Angerton is a civil parish in the Westmorland and Furness district of Cumbria, England. It was historically part of the Furness portion of Lancashire. The parish includes a few houses, Angerton Hall, and Angerton Marsh. At the 2021 census, the population was 25.

== History ==
Angerton, also called Angerton Moss, was historically an extra-parochial area within the Lonsdale Hundred of Lancashire. It was bounded on three sides by the parish of Kirkby Ireleth, and on the fourth (western) side by the estuary of the River Duddon. Angerton became a civil parish in 1858 under the Extra-Parochial Places Act 1857, which sought to eliminate such areas that lay outside any parish.

When elected parish and district councils were established under the Local Government Act 1894, Angerton was included in the Ulverston Rural District, which was renamed North Lonsdale Rural District in 1960. Angerton was too small to qualify for a parish council, and so it had a parish meeting instead. North Lonsdale Rural District was abolished in 1974, and Angerton became part of the South Lakeland district in the new county of Cumbria. In 1976, Angerton was placed under a grouped parish council covering the three civil parishes of Angerton, Broughton West, and Dunnerdale-with-Seathwaite. South Lakeland was abolished in 2023 when the new Westmorland and Furness Council was created, also taking over the functions of the abolished Cumbria County Council in the area.

== Governance ==
There are two tiers of local government covering Angerton, at parish and unitary authority level: Duddon Parish Council and Westmorland and Furness Council. The parish council is a grouped parish council, covering the three parishes of Broughton West, Angerton, and Dunnerdale-with-Seathwaite. The parish council meets at the Victory Hall in Broughton-in-Furness.
