= Rosthwaite =

Rosthwaite may refer to:

- Rosthwaite, Borrowdale, Cumbria, England (a settlement some 6 miles (9.7 km) south of Keswick)
- Rosthwaite, Broughton, Cumbria, England (a settlement 3 miles (4.8 km) north-east of Broughton-in-Furness)
- Rosthwaite Fell, a summit overlooking Borrowdale in the English Lake District
