= Rosthwaite, Cumbria =

Rosthwaite, Cumbria may refer to two different settlements in the English county of Cumbria:

- Rosthwaite, Borrowdale, Cumbria (6 miles (9.7 km) south of Keswick)
- Rosthwaite, Broughton, Cumbria (3 miles (4.8 km) north-east of Broughton-in-Furness)
