= Bankend =

Bankend may refer to:

- Bankend, Dumfries and Galloway, Scotland
- Bankend, Saskatchewan, Canada
- Bankend, South Lanarkshire, Scotland

== See also ==
- Bank End, a village in Cumbria, England
