= Holy Trinity Church, Seathwaite =

Coordinates: 54.3549°N 3.1878°W

Holy Trinity Church
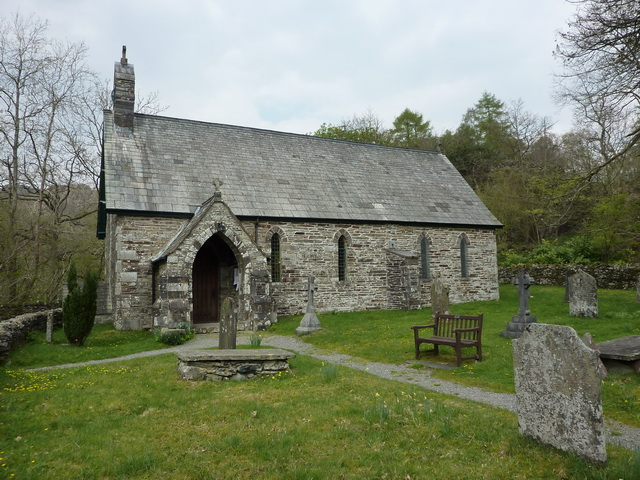
- Holy Trinity Church, Seathwaite, from the south

- Location in South Lakeland Location in Cumbria
- OS grid reference: SD 229,961
- Location: Seathwaite, Cumbria
- Country: England
- Denomination: Anglican
- Website: Holy Trinity, Seathwaite

History
- Status: Parish church

Architecture
- Functional status: Active
- Heritage designation: Grade II
- Designated: 25 March 1970
- Architect: Paley and Austin
- Architectural type: Church
- Style: Gothic Revival
- Completed: 1874

Specifications
- Materials: Slate

Administration
- Province: York
- Diocese: Carlisle
- Archdeaconry: Westmorland and Furness
- Deanery: Furness
- Parish: Broughton and Duddon

Clergy
- Priest: Revd Stephen Tudway

Holy Trinity Church is in the village of Seathwaite, Cumbria, England. It is an active Anglican parish church in the deanery of Furness, the archdeaconry of Westmorland and Furness, and the diocese of Carlisle. Its benefice is united with those of four other local parishes. The church is recorded in the National Heritage List for England as a designated Grade II listed building.

== History ==
The church was built in 1874 to a design by the Lancaster partnership of Paley and Austin. Holy Trinity was built on the site of an earlier church. For 67 years the curate of that church had been Robert Walker, who was made famous by the poet William Wordsworth. Wordsworth called him "Wonderful Walker", and made reference to him in his Duddon Sonnets and in the poem The Excursion. It was paid for mainly by the industrialist H. W. Schneider.

== Architecture ==
=== Exterior ===
Holy Trinity is constructed in coursed slate rubble and has a slate roof. Its plan consists of a nave and chancel in one range, with an organ loft and vestry to the north, and a south porch. At the west end is a gabled bellcote. All the windows are lancets. There are wide buttresses externally between the nave and the chancel. A stone is attached to the porch incorporating a sundial; this had formerly been the shearing stool of Walker.

=== Interior ===
Inside the church is a stoup with a trefoil arcade. Painted on the wall of the chancel are the Ten Commandments. Also in the church is a brass. This had formerly been on a gravestone; it is to the memory of Walker, who died in 1802, and his wife, Anne, who had died two years previously. The stained glass, dating from 1897, is by Kempe. The two-manual organ was built in 1902 by Young.

== See also ==
- List of ecclesiastical works by Paley and Austin
- Listed buildings in Dunnerdale-with-Seathwaite
