= Old Town Hall, Broughton-in-Furness =

Municipal building in Broughton-in-Furness, Cumbria, England

Old Town Hall
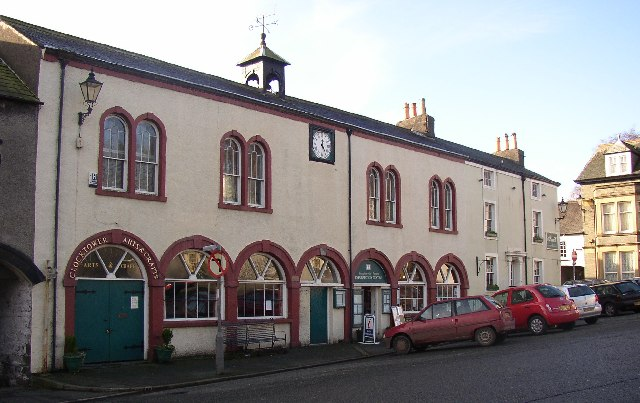
- The building in 2004

- Shown in Cumbria
- 54.2776°N 3.2116°W
- Location: The Square, Broughton-in-Furness

History
- Built: 1766

Site notes
- Architectural style: Italianate style

Listed Building – Grade II
- Official name: Market Hall
- Designated: 5 March 1990
- Reference no.: 1138235

The Old Town Hall is a municipal building in The Square, Broughton-in-Furness, a town in Cumbria, England. The building, which currently accommodates a tourist information centre and a shop, is a Grade II listed building.

== History ==
The building was commissioned as a market hall by the lord of the manor, John Gilpin Sawrey, whose seat was at Broughton Tower c. 0.3 miles (0.48 km) to the northeast of the centre of the town. The building formed part of a grander scheme by Sawrey to lay out a market square for the town. His vision was to create a square that recalled the great squares of London, and the market hall, on the south side of the proposed square, was the first step in implementing that plan. The scheme was seen as very successful: the architectural historian, Nikolaus Pevsner, has described the square with its trees as "handsome".

The building was designed in the Italianate style, built in brick with a cement render finish and was completed in 1766. The design involved a main frontage of seven bays facing onto The Square. It was arcaded so that markets could be held, with an assembly hall on the first floor.

The use of the building as a market hall declined significantly in the wake of the Great depression of British agriculture in the late 19th century. In the early 20th century, the building remained in the ownership of the Broughton Tower Estate. However, lock-up shops were established on the ground floor and the assembly hall on the first floor was increasingly used for social events such as dances. Ownership of the building became vested in the trustees of the "Broughton Reading and Recreation Rooms".

Later on the uses changed again and a tourist information centre was established on the ground floor, while an antiques shop was accommodated on the first floor. The clock was the subject of an 18-month refurbishment programme which was completed in 2007.

== Architecture ==
The town hall is a two-storey stone building, with a slate roof. The ground floor has a seven-bay arcade with architraves and keystones, since infilled with entrances and glazing, while the first floor has four sets of paired round-headed windows. There is a central clock, and a bell turret, topped by a weathervane depicting figures from a hunt. The clock was designed and manufactured by a local clockmaker, William Shepherd, and requires winding twice a week by a local volunteer. The building was grade II listed in 1990.

== See also ==
- Listed buildings in Broughton West
