= Rosthwaite, Broughton West =

Coordinates: 54.299748°N 3.168697°W

Rosthwaite
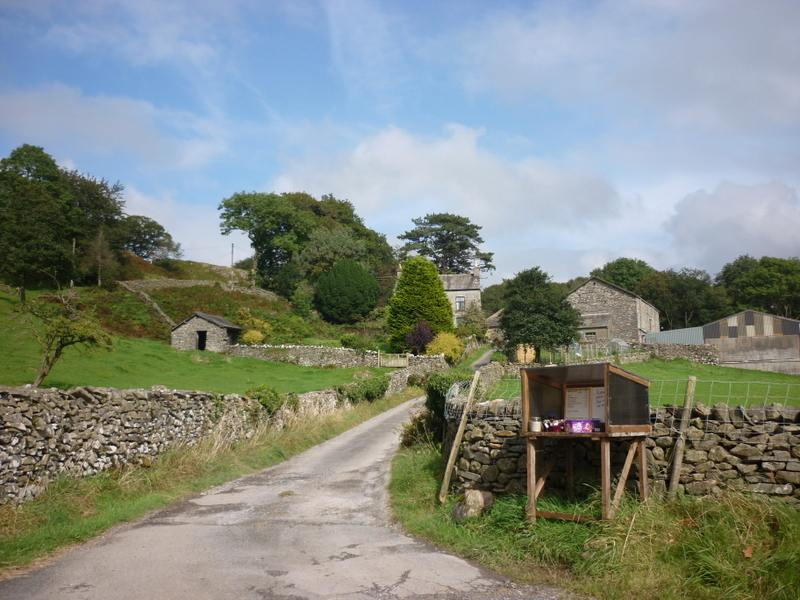
- High Rosthwaite Farm

- Location within Cumbria
- OS grid reference: SD239899
- Civil parish: Broughton West
- Unitary authority: Westmorland and Furness
- Ceremonial county: Cumbria
- Region: North West
- Country: England
- Sovereign state: United Kingdom
- Post town: BROUGHTON-IN-FURNESS
- Postcode district: LA20
- Dialling code: 01229
- Police: Cumbria
- Fire: Cumbria
- Ambulance: North West
- UK Parliament: Barrow and Furness

Rosthwaite is a settlement in the Broughton West civil parish of Westmorland and Furness, Cumbria England. It is part of the Lake District, 3 miles (4.8 km) north-east of Broughton-in-Furness.

The settlement is within the Barrow and Furness constituency of the United Kingdom Parliament. Prior to Brexit in 2020 it was part of the North West England constituency of the European Parliament.
