= Foxfield, Cumbria =

Village in Cumbria, England

Coordinates: 54.258°N 3.215°W

Foxfield
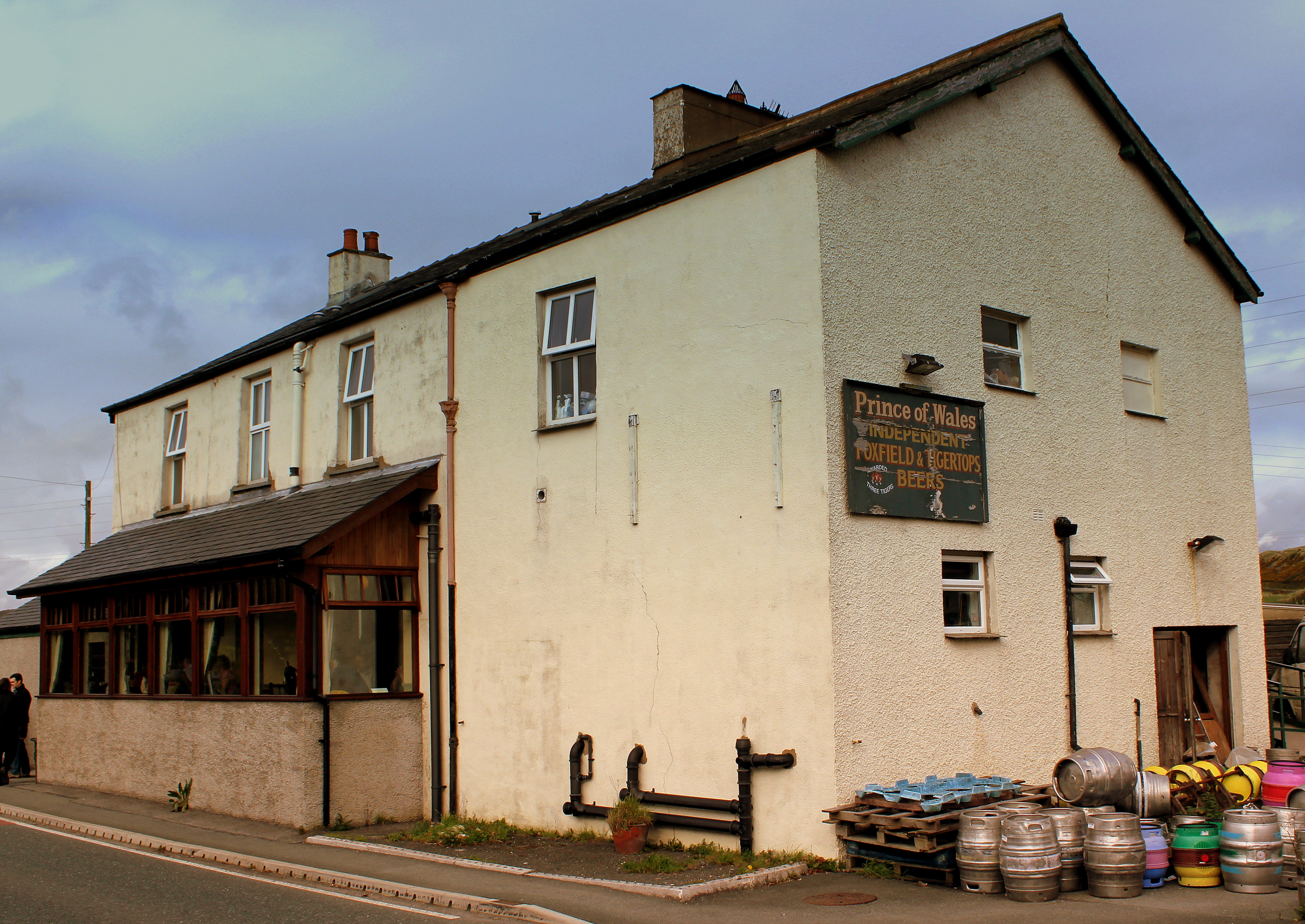
- The Prince of Wales public house, Foxfield

- Location in South Lakeland Location within Cumbria
- OS grid reference: SD208854
- Civil parish: Broughton West
- Unitary authority: Westmorland and Furness
- Ceremonial county: Cumbria
- Region: North West
- Country: England
- Sovereign state: United Kingdom
- Post town: BROUGHTON-IN-FURNESS
- Postcode district: LA20
- Dialling code: 01229
- Police: Cumbria
- Fire: Cumbria
- Ambulance: North West
- UK Parliament: Barrow and Furness

Foxfield is a village on the west coast of Cumbria, England, in the Furness district that was part of Lancashire from 1182 to 1974. It lies on the Duddon Estuary, just outside the Lake District National Park, around ten miles to the north-east of Barrow-in-Furness and one mile out of Broughton-in-Furness. It is part of the parish of Broughton West.

The village contains a public house, the Prince of Wales, and Foxfield railway station on the Cumbria Coast Line, where a branch line to Broughton and Coniston used to commence.
