= Richard Parkinson (priest) =

British clergyman and antiquary (1797–1858)

The Reverend Canon Richard Parkinson
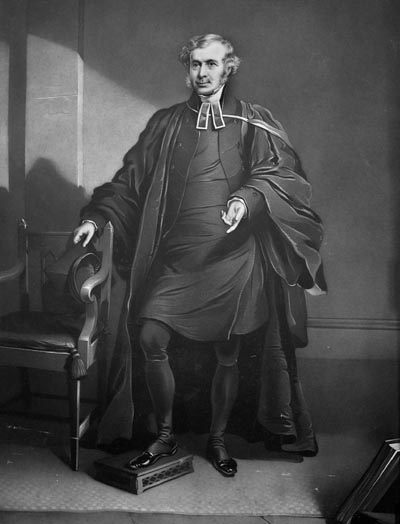
- Born: 17 September 1797; Woodgates, Admarsh, Lancaster, England
- Died: 28 January 1858 (aged 60); St Bees, Cumberland, England
- Education: Sedbergh; St John's College, Cambridge
- Occupations: Anglican Clergyman; Theologian; Antiquary

Richard Parkinson (1797–1858) was an English clergyman, known as a canon of Manchester Cathedral, college principal, theologian and antiquarian.

== Background ==
The son of John Parkinson, by his wife Margaret Blackburne, he was born at Woodgates, Admarsh, near Lancaster, on 17 September 1797. He was educated at the grammar schools of Chipping, Hawkstead, and Sedbergh, and at St John's College, Cambridge, where he matriculated in December 1815. At Sedbergh he was the last pupil who studied mathematics under John Dawson, and at Cambridge his tutor was Thomas Calvert. He graduated B.A. in 1820, proceeding M.A. in 1824, B.D. in 1838, and D.D. on 10 December 1851.

== Career ==
On leaving Cambridge in 1820, Parkinson was for a short time master of Lea School, near Preston. He edited the Preston Sentinel, a conservative newspaper, during its one year's existence (1821), and contributed to its successor, the Preston Pilot. In 1823 he was ordained, and became curate of St. Michael's-on-Wyre, Lancashire. Three years later he was appointed theological lecturer or tutor at St Bees Theological College, Cumberland; twenty years later he was its principal.

In 1830 he was appointed perpetual curate of Whitworth, near Rochdale This living he resigned in 1841, in favour of his curate. In 1833 he preached at Bishop Charles Sumner's visitation at Manchester; and he was elected (on 20 May 1833) as fellow of the collegiate chapter. He was elected to the membership of Manchester Literary and Philosophical Society on 1 November 1833.

In 1837, and again in 1838, he was Hulsean lecturer at Cambridge. His retention of the fellowship (and then canonry) of the collegiate church after his appointment in September 1846 as principal of St Bees Theological College, and incumbent of St Bees Priory, led to some bad feeling. He was a liberal donor to church objects, and gave towards the cost of rebuilding the vicarage-house and the old conventual abbey of St Bees.

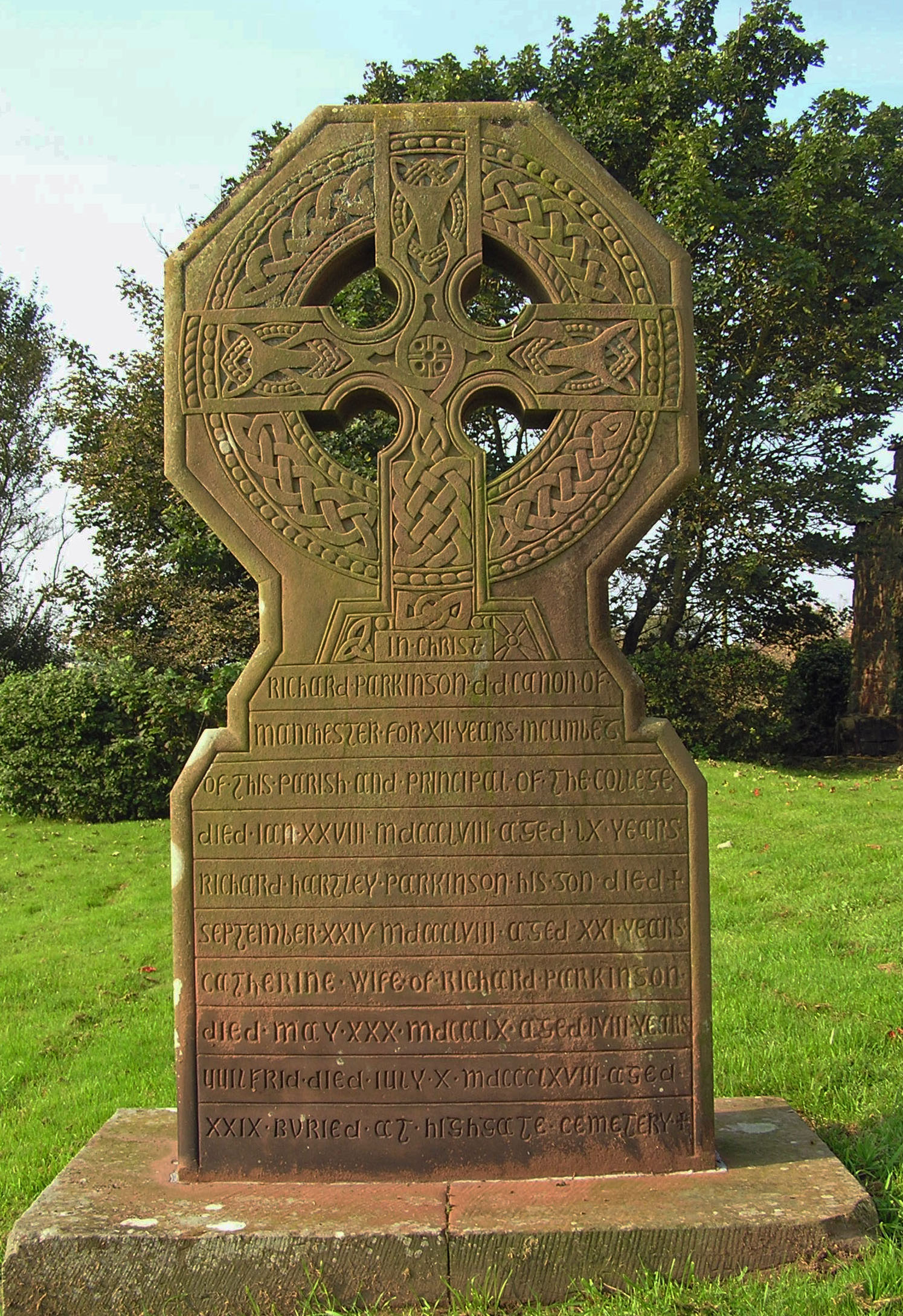
Grave of Canon Richard Parkinson, died 1858, at St Bees Priory, Cumbria.

On 1 March 1857 Parkinson was seized with an attack of paralysis while in the pulpit of Manchester Cathedral. On 28 January 1858 he had a second paralytic seizure at St. Bees, and died on the same day. He was one of the founder Members of the Chetham Society, and served as Vice-President from 1843 to 1858.

== Works ==
Parkinson wrote for Blackwood's Magazine, one of his pieces (November 1820) being a parody on Young Lochinvar. He obtained the Seatonian prize at Cambridge in 1830 for his poem on the Ascent of Elijah, ahead of Winthrop Mackworth Praed and others.

Parkinson edited for the Chetham Society:

- The Life of Adam Martindale, 1845.
- The Autobiography of Henry Newcome, 1851–2, 2 vols.
- The Private Journal and Literary Remains of John Byrom, 4 vols. 1853–8. The notes to this were contributed by Francis Robert Raines and James Crossley.
- The Journal of Elizabeth Byrom in 1745, 1857

With sermons and pamphlets, Parkinson also published:

- Sermons on Points of Doctrine and Rules of Duty, 1825.
- Poems Sacred and Miscellaneous, Whitehaven, 1832; reissued with Appendix in 1845.
- Rationalism and Revelation: Hulsean Lectures, 1837.
- The Constitution of the Visible Church of Christ: Hulsean Lectures, 1838.
- The Old Church Clock, 1843; 4th edit. 1852; 5th edit. 1880, with memoir and notes by John Evans. This story, in which is interwoven a narrative of "Wonderful Walker", was originally issued in the Christian Magazine.

== Family ==
Parkinson married, in 1831, Catherine, daughter of Thomas Hartley of Gill Foot, Cumberland (she died in 1860), and they had two sons and two daughters.

== Notes ==
Attribution

This article incorporates text from a publication now in the public domain: Lee, Sidney, ed. (1895). "Parkinson, Richard (1797-1858)". Dictionary of National Biography. Vol. 43. London: Smith, Elder & Co.

Professional and academic associations
| Preceded by Creation | Vice-President of the Chetham Society; 1843–58 | Succeeded by Francis Robert Raines |
