= Francis Robert Raines =

British vicar and historian (1805–1878)

The Reverend Canon Francis Robert Raines FSA
- Born: 22 February 1805; Whitby, Yorkshire, England
- Died: 17 October 1878 (aged 73); Scarborough, Yorkshire, England
- Education: Clitheroe Royal Grammar School; Burnley Grammar School; St Bees' Theological College
- Occupations: Anglican Clergyman; Antiquary

Francis Robert Raines FSA (22 February 1805 – 17 October 1878) was the Anglican vicar of Milnrow, Lancashire, known as an antiquary. He edited 23 volumes for the Chetham Society publications. He also transcribed 44 volumes of manuscripts.

== Early life ==
He was born 22 February 1805 in Whitby, the son of Isaac Raines, M.D. and Ann, daughter of Joseph Robertson. At thirteen years old, he was sent to Clitheroe, Lancashire, as an apprentice surgeon. He later moved to Burnley with his employer, during which time he went to the Clitheroe and Burnley Grammar Schools. In 1826, he was released from his apprenticeship and admitted to St. Bees' Theological College.

== Career ==
He was ordained in 1828, and after short appointments at Saddleworth and Rochdale, he was vicar at Milnrow for the rest of his life. He was a founder Member of the Chetham Society, serving as a Member of Council from 1843, and as Vice-President from 1858.

Raines died after a short illness at Scarborough on 17 October 1878, aged 73, and was buried in Milnrow churchyard.

== Works ==
- Francis Gastrell, Notitia Cestriensis: Or Historical Notices of the Diocese of Chester (1850) editor
- Miscellanies: being a selection from the poems and correspondence of the Rev. T. Wilson (1857). Concerns Thomas Wilson (1747–1813).
- A History of the Chantries Within the County Palatine of Lancaster: Being the Reports of the Royal Commissioners of Henry VIII., Edward VI. and Queen Mary (1862) editor
- William Dugdale, The Visitation of the County Palatine of Lancaster, Made in the Year 1664-5 (1872–73) editor
- The Vicars of Rochdale (1883)
- The Rectors of Manchester, and the Wardens of the Collegiate Church of that Town (1885)
- The Fellows of the Collegiate Church of Manchester (1891)

Professional and academic associations
Preceded by Richard Parkinson	Vice-President of the Chetham Society; 1858–78	Succeeded by William Beamont
