= Seathwaite, Westmorland and Furness =

Village in Cumbria, England

Coordinates: 54.354°N 3.188°W

Seathwaite
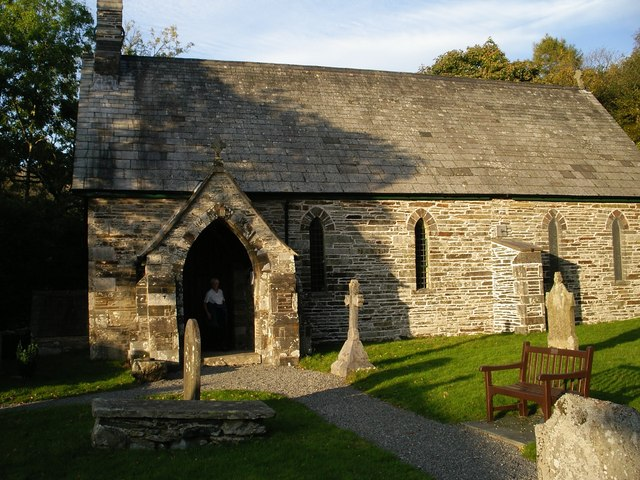
- Holy Trinity Church

- Location within Cumbria
- Population: 129 (2001)
- OS grid reference: SD2296
- Civil parish: Dunnerdale-with-Seathwaite
- Unitary authority: Westmorland and Furness
- Ceremonial county: Cumbria
- Region: North West
- Country: England
- Sovereign state: United Kingdom
- Post town: BROUGHTON IN FURNESS
- Postcode district: LA20
- Dialling code: 01229
- Police: Cumbria
- Fire: Cumbria
- Ambulance: North West
- UK Parliament: Barrow and Furness

Seathwaite is a village in the Dunnerdale-with-Seathwaite civil parish in the Westmorland and Furness district of Cumbria in North West England. It is in the Lake District and part of historic Lancashire. The parish has a population of 129. The village's name comes from old Norse words sef (sedges) and thveit (clearing) and may be taken to mean "Sedges clearing"; written records from 1340 spell the village as Seuthwayt.

Nearby Seathwaite Tarn takes its name from the village, the tarn is west of the Coniston Fells and the village is further south west of the tarn. The village is north east of Hall Dunnerdale. It around the old Walna Scar road, which can be reached from the A595 in the south, or the A593 from Skelwith Bridge through the steep Hardknott–Wrynose pass road heading north.

A local landmark is the Newfield Inn, a pub that dates from the 16th century that is reputed to have been visited by William Wordsworth on his trips around the Lake District in the early 19th century. Another prominent local building is the Church of the Holy Trinity which was originally built in the early 16th century. William Wordsworth visited the church and dedicated one of his 35 Duddon Sonnets to the place and to Robert Walker (1709–1802) who was parson at the church for 66 years. The church contains a memorial plaque to Walker, who was known as "Wonderful Walker" because of his long and exemplary ministry. Wordsworth refers to him in the sonnet as someone "whose good works formed an endless retinue". The church itself was completely rebuilt in 1874 due to its rundown state, it was reconsecrated in May 1875.

== See also ==
- Listed buildings in Dunnerdale-with-Seathwaite
- Cumbrian placename etymology
