= Robert Walker (priest, of Seathwaite) =

Robert Walker (1709–1802), called Wonderful Walker, was a Church of England priest in Dunnerdale, now in Cumbria. In around 1804, William and Dorothy Wordsworth became interested in the local stories about him; William mentioned Walker in The Excursion, and later in one of his sonnets.

== Life ==
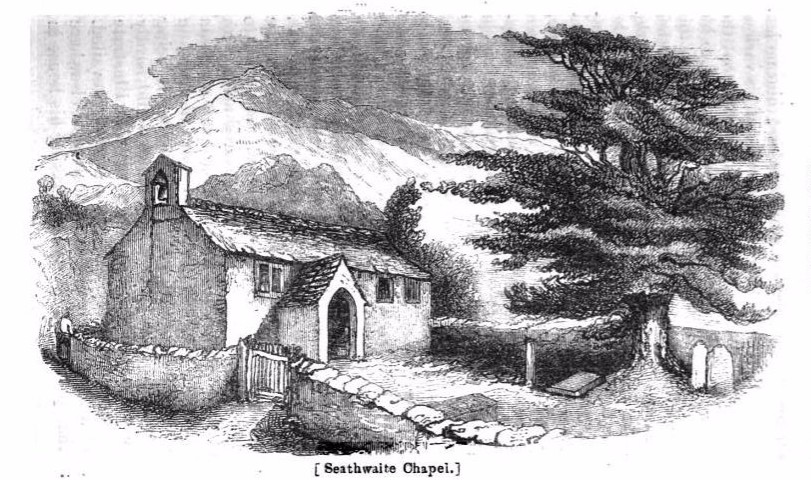
Old chapel at Seathwaite, 1844 woodcut

Walker was born at Undercrag in Seathwaite, Dunnerdale, Furness, then in Lancashire, in 1709. He was the son of Nicholas Walker, a yeoman farmer, and his wife Elizabeth, and was the youngest of 12 children; his eldest brother was born about 1684. He was taught at an elementary level in Seathwaite Chapel. Regarded as frail by his parents, he sought more education and ordination, in Eskdale and the Vale of Lorton, with support from clerical patrons.

Walker was schoolmaster in Loweswater in 1735, when he became curate of Seathwaite. In 1755–6, he proposed to the bishop of Chester that the curacy of Ulpha should be joined to that of Seathwaite, but was turned down. A few years later the curacy was slightly enlarged.

Walker farmed his glebe land, and laboured for other farmers. He earned small sums as scrivener to the surrounding villages. He also acted as schoolmaster, for gifts rather than charging fees.

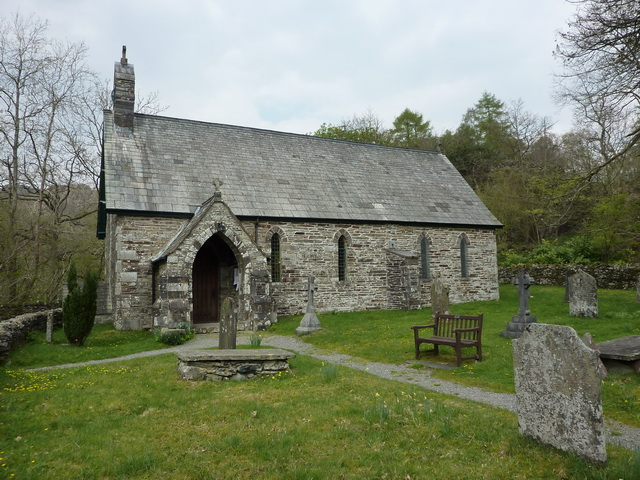
Holy Trinity Church, Seathwaite, today, rebuilt in the 19th century

== Death and legacy ==
Walker died on 25 June 1802, and was buried in Seathwaite churchyard. His tombstone later had a new inscription cut, and a brass was erected to his memory in Seathwaite chapel. He left £1500 or £2000 in savings.

== Reputation in literature ==
Walker dressed and lived simply. His life was sketched by William Wordsworth, who alluded to his grave in The Excursion (bk. vii. ll. 351 sq.), and in the eighteenth sonnet of The River Duddon, A Series of Sonnets (1820) ("Seathwaite Chapel") referred to Walker as the "Gospel Teacher

Whose good works formed an endless retinue,
A pastor such as Chaucer's verse portrays,
Such as the heaven-taught skill of Herbert drew
And tender Goldsmith crowned with deathless praise."

Walker's character was idealised to some extent by Wordsworth. Robert Walker Bamford (1796–1838), a cleric and great-grandson of Walker, published a memoir in the Christian Remembrancer in 1819, cited by Wordsworth in his notes to the sonnet. Both Bamford and Wordsworth omitted to mention Walker's sale of ale, which was one of the ways in which he supported himself. Richard Parkinson, who included material about Walker in a novel, The Old Church Clock (1843), also slanted the facts. He wrote in the novel's introduction:

"Nor was it merely as an exemplary parish priest, (and well does Robert Walker deserve the title of Priest of the Lakes [...]), that the character of this good man is to be regarded, but as one striking instance out of many (if the history of our Parish Priesthood could now be written) in which the true liturgical teaching of the church was strictly maintained in the lower ranks of the clergy, when it had been either totally discontinued or had withered down to a mere lifeless form, in the higher."

Edwin Waugh included an account of Walker in his Rambles in the Lake Country and its Borders from 1861. In 1892, Samuel Barber wrote that "The wonderful Walker type of parson may be considered about as extinct as the Dodo."

== Family ==
Walker and his wife Ann (née Tyson, died 1800, at age around 93) had ten children, of whom eight—three sons and five daughters—survived to adulthood. With an income as priest calculated as £20 per annum in 1755, Walker supported his family's finances in other ways, including by spinning wool, which became a family business.

The eldest son, Zaccheus Walker (1736–1808), joined the engineering firm Boulton and Watt and married Mary Boulton, sister of Matthew Boulton. Their only daughter married Joseph Vincent Barber. Another son, who predeceased his father, was William Tyson Walker. He was a curate and schoolteacher at Ulverston, where one of his pupils was the future Sir John Barrow, 1st Baronet. Barrow remembered him, around 1777, as a good classical scholar, educated at Trinity College Dublin.

== Notes ==
Attribution

This article incorporates text from a publication now in the public domain: Lee, Sidney, ed. (1899). "Walker, Robert (1709-1802)". Dictionary of National Biography. Vol. 59. London: Smith, Elder & Co.
