= Broughton West =

Civil parish in Cumbria, England

Coordinates: 54.299°N 3.187°W

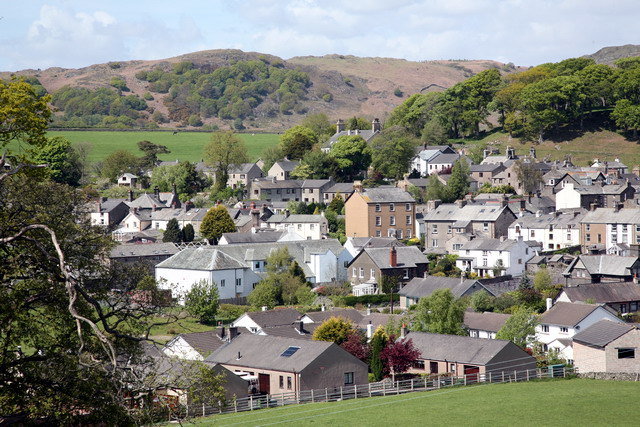
- Broughton in Furness

- Location within Cumbria
- Population: 925 (Parish, 2021)
- OS grid reference: SD2187
- Civil parish: Broughton West
- Unitary authority: Westmorland and Furness
- Ceremonial county: Cumbria
- Region: North West
- Country: England
- Sovereign state: United Kingdom
- Post town: BROUGHTON IN FURNESS
- Postcode district: LA20
- Dialling code: 01229
- Police: Cumbria
- Fire: Cumbria
- Ambulance: North West
- UK Parliament: Barrow and Furness

Broughton West is a civil parish in the Westmorland and Furness district of Cumbria, England. It is based around the small town of Broughton-in-Furness, for which Broughton West was historically an alternative name. The parish also includes the small village of Foxfield, and the hamlets of Bank End, Lower Hawthwaite and Broughton Mills.

== History ==
Broughton was historically a township in the ancient parish of Kirkby Ireleth, which formed part of the Lonsdale Hundred of Lancashire. The township was known as "Broughton West" or "Broughton-in-Furness", to distinguish it from the other township in Lonsdale Hundred called Broughton, 14 miles (23 km) to the east, which was also known as Broughton-in-Cartmel or Broughton East. St Mary Magdalene's Church at Broughton-in-Furness, although dating back to at least the 12th century, was a chapel of ease to St Cuthbert's Church at Kirkby Ireleth until 1870, when an ecclesiastical parish of Broughton-in-Furness was created.

The township took on civil functions under the poor laws from the 17th century onwards. As such, the township also became a civil parish in 1866, when the legal definition of 'parish' was changed to be the areas used for administering the poor laws. Whereas the name Broughton-in-Furness was used for the ecclesiastical parish and by the General Post Office for postal addresses, the civil parish used the Broughton West variant of the name.

When elected parish and district councils were created under the Local Government Act 1894, Broughton West was given a parish council and included in the Ulverston Rural District, which was renamed North Lonsdale Rural District in 1960. North Lonsdale Rural District was abolished in 1974, and Broughton West became part of the South Lakeland district in the new county of Cumbria. Broughton West ceased to have its own parish council in 1976, when it was grouped with the neighbouring parishes of Angerton and Dunnerdale-with-Seathwaite under Duddon Parish Council. South Lakeland was abolished in 2023 when the new Westmorland and Furness Council was created, also taking over the functions of the abolished Cumbria County Council in the area.

== Governance ==
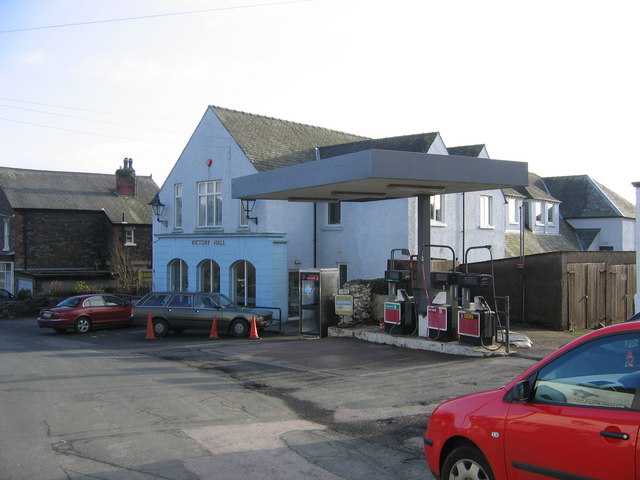
Victory Hall, Station Road, Broughton-in-Furness: Meeting place of Duddon Parish Council

There are two tiers of local government covering Broughton West, at parish and unitary authority level: Duddon Parish Council and Westmorland and Furness Council. The parish council is a grouped parish council covering the three parishes of Broughton West, Angerton and Dunnerdale-with-Seathwaite. The parish council meets at the Victory Hall on Station Road in Broughton-in-Furness.

== Demography ==
At the 2021 census the population of the parish was 925. The population had been 954 at the 2001 census, and 912 at the 2011 census.

== See also ==
- Listed buildings in Broughton West
