= Birks Bridge =

Stone bridge in Cumbria, England

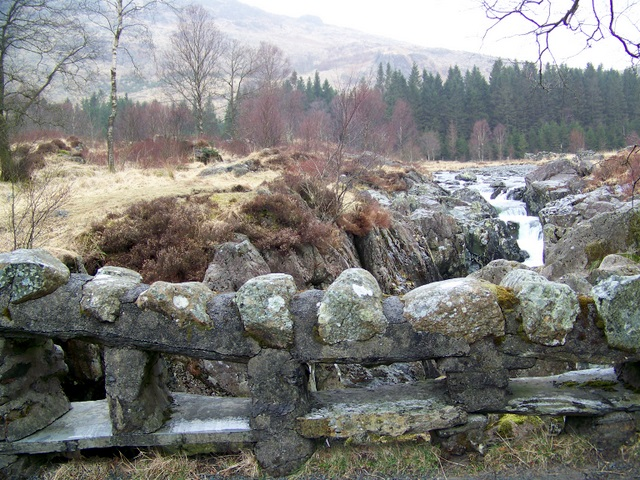
- Coordinates: 54.38383°N 3.18069°W
- Crosses: River Duddon
- Locale: Dunnerdale-with-Seathwaite, Cumbria, England

Statistics

Listed Building – Grade II*
- Official name: Birks Bridge
- Designated: 05-Mar-1990
- Reference no.: 1086826

Location
- Interactive map of Birks Bridge

Birks Bridge is a traditional stone-built bridge over the River Duddon in the English Lake District, in Dunnerdale-with-Seathwaite, Cumbria, standing at Grid Reference SD239995.

== History and construction ==
The bridge was built around the 18th century, with voussoirs and inbuilt drainage, and became a listed building in 1990.

== Aspect ==
Birks Bridge is a packhorse bridge of outstanding beauty, even for Lakeland. Hunter Davies described how "the hump-back stone bridge seems itself to be a work of nature, blending and melding so well with the rocks either side". Wainwright considered this a tribute to the artistry of craftsmen of former times.

== See also ==
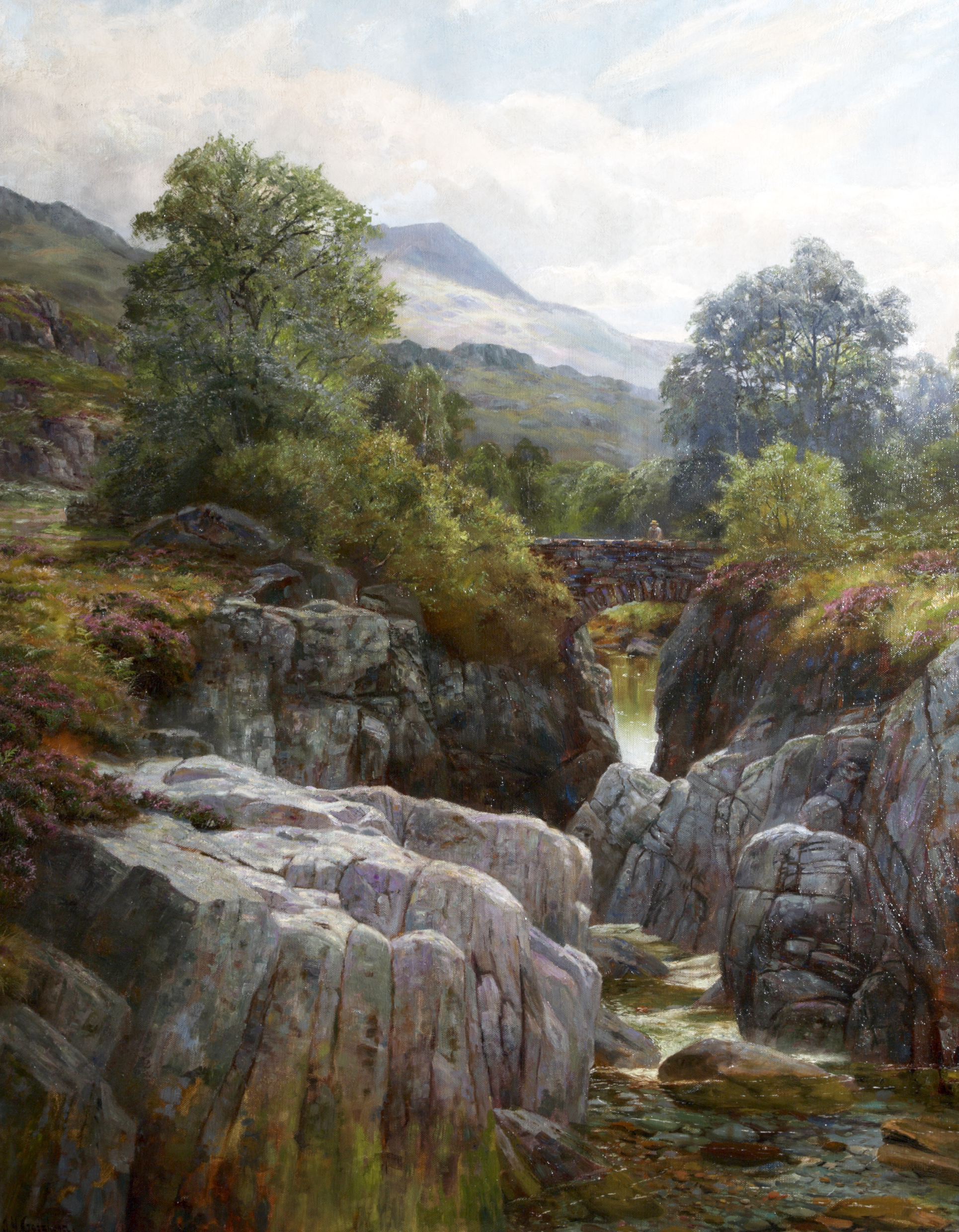
- Birks Bridge Duddon Valley by James Henry Crossland, circa 1900
  Listed buildings in Dunnerdale-with-Seathwaite
- Ashness Bridge
- Harter Fell (Eskdale)
- Slater's Bridge
