= Blacksmiths Arms, Broughton Mills =

Pub in Broughton Mills, Cumbria, England

Coordinates: 54.303863°N 3.197568°W

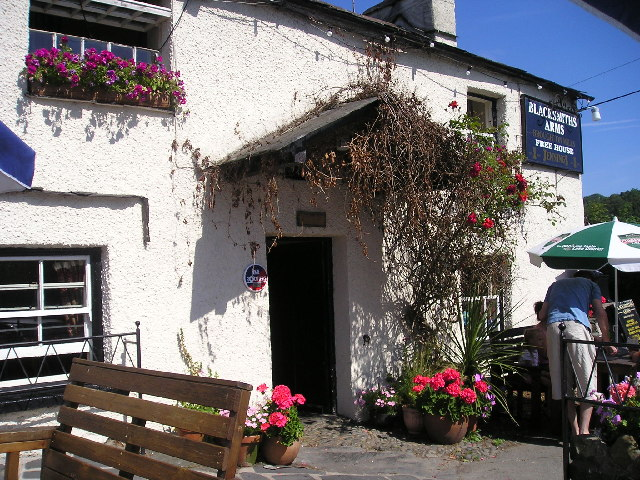
The Blacksmiths Arms

The Blacksmiths Arms is a Grade II listed public house at Broughton Mills, Cumbria, England.

It is on the Campaign for Real Ale's National Inventory of Historic Pub Interiors.

== History ==
Parts of the building date from 1577 when it was a farmhouse called "Broadstones". It was revised and converted into an inn in 1748, when it included a blacksmith's forge and had a working farm of 34 acres (14 ha).

The chef Michael Lane took over the pub in 2004.

== Architecture ==
The roughcast stone whitewashed building has stone flagstone floors and a slate roof. The two-storey structure is of four-bays.

In one of the dining rooms is the original range and fireplace. There are still working gas lights in two of the rooms.
