= Broughton-in-Furness =

Town in Cumbria, England

Coordinates: 54.278°N 3.214°W

- Town
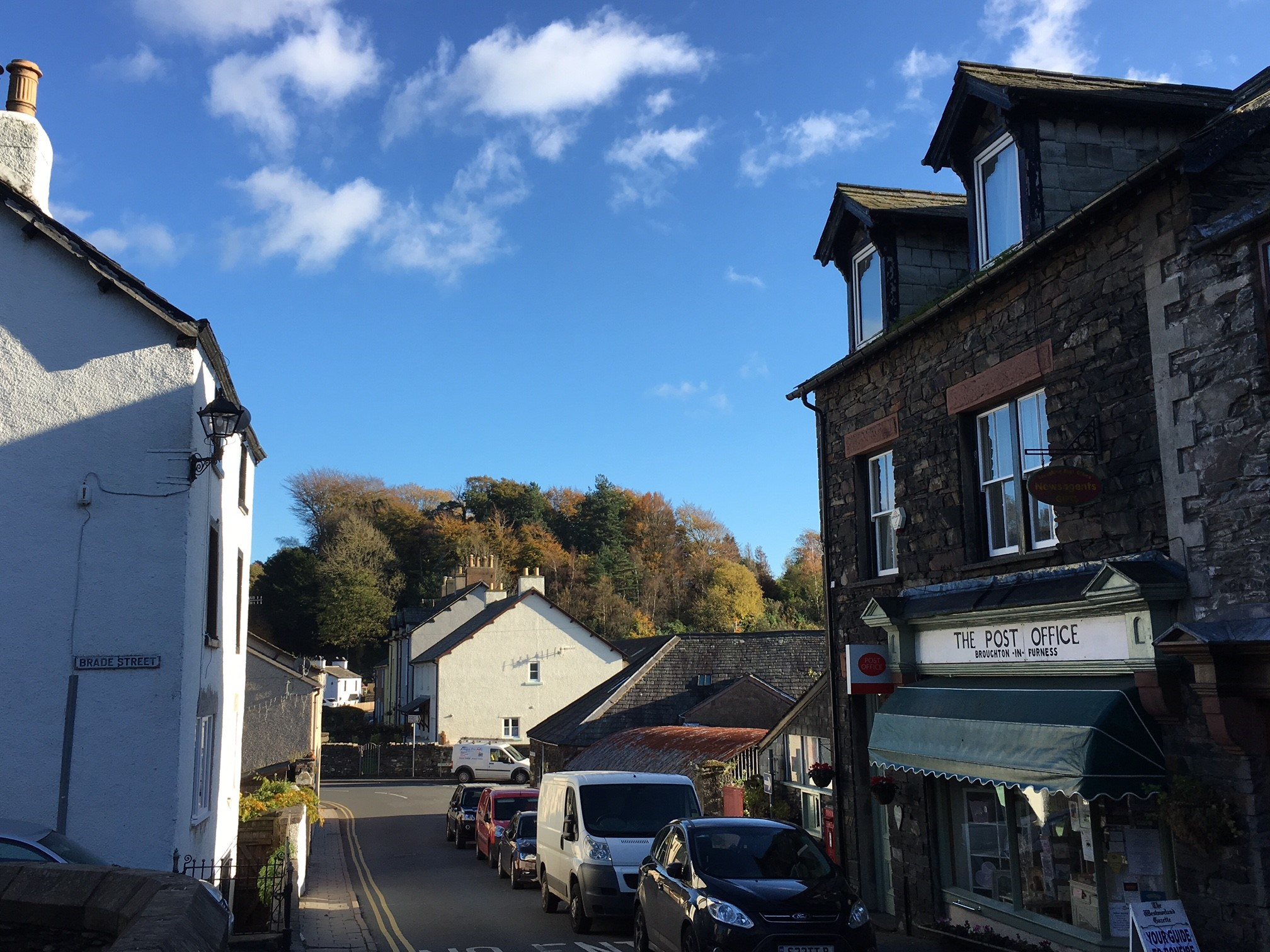
- Prince's Street, Broughton-in-Furness

- Location within Cumbria
- Population: 549 (2021 Census)
- OS grid reference: SD2087
- Civil parish: Broughton West
- Unitary authority: Westmorland and Furness
- Ceremonial county: Cumbria
- Region: North West
- Country: England
- Sovereign state: United Kingdom
- Post town: BROUGHTON-IN-FURNESS
- Postcode district: LA20
- Dialling code: 01229
- Police: Cumbria
- Fire: Cumbria
- Ambulance: North West
- UK Parliament: Barrow and Furness

Broughton-in-Furness is a small market town in the civil parish of Broughton West in the Westmorland and Furness district of Cumbria, England. It is located on the south western boundary of England's Lake District National Park, and in the Furness region, which was historically part of Lancashire. It had a population of 549 at the 2021 Census.

== History ==
The name Broughton derives from the Old English brōctūn meaning 'settlement by the brook'.

Broughton-in-Furness is mentioned in the Domesday Book of 1086 as one of the townships forming the Manor of Hougun held by Tostig Godwinson, Earl of Northumbria. Dating from around the eleventh century, the original settlement grew to become the local market town for both fishing and agriculture. Wool was particularly important for the town's development. The town was given a charter in 1575.

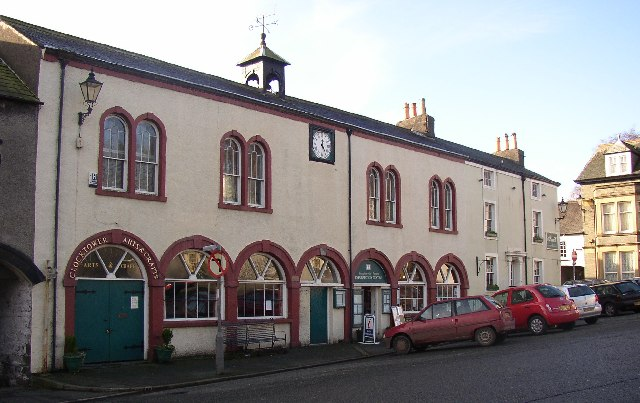
Old Town Hall

The Market Square was formally laid out in 1760 by John Gilpin Sawrey, the Lord of the Manor, who lived at Broughton Tower, a large mansion just a short distance from the Square. Key developments around the Market Square included the Old Town Hall.

In the 1990s the A595 road was diverted in an attempt to improve the environment of the town and help it retain its rural feel.

== Governance ==
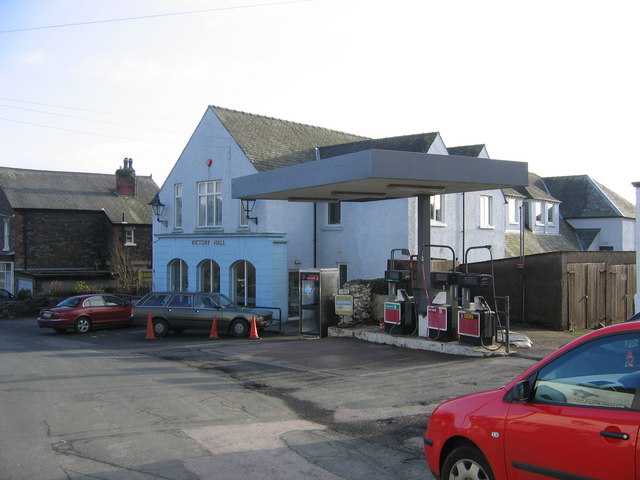
Victory Hall, Station Road

Broughton-in-Furness forms part of the civil parish of Broughton West. There are two tiers of local government covering Broughton West, at parish and unitary authority level: Duddon Parish Council and Westmorland and Furness Council. The parish council is a grouped parish council covering the three parishes of Broughton West, Angerton and Dunnerdale-with-Seathwaite. The parish council meets at the Victory Hall on Station Road in Broughton.

=== Administrative history ===
Broughton was historically a township in the ancient parish of Kirkby Ireleth, which formed part of the Lonsdale Hundred of Lancashire. The township was known as "Broughton West" or "Broughton-in-Furness", to distinguish it from the other township in Lonsdale Hundred called Broughton, 14 miles (23 km) to the east, which was also known as Broughton-in-Cartmel or Broughton East. St Mary Magdalene's Church at Broughton-in-Furness, although dating back to at least the 12th century, was a chapel of ease to St Cuthbert's Church at Kirkby Ireleth until 1870, when an ecclesiastical parish of Broughton-in-Furness was created.

The township took on civil functions under the poor laws from the 17th century onwards. As such, the township also became a civil parish in 1866, when the legal definition of 'parish' was changed to be the areas used for administering the poor laws. Whereas the name Broughton-in-Furness was used for the ecclesiastical parish and by the General Post Office for postal addresses, the civil parish used the Broughton West variant of the name.

When elected parish and district councils were created under the Local Government Act 1894, Broughton West was given a parish council and included in the Ulverston Rural District, which was renamed North Lonsdale Rural District in 1960. North Lonsdale Rural District was abolished in 1974, and Broughton West became part of the South Lakeland district in the new county of Cumbria. Broughton West ceased to have its own parish council in 1976, when it was grouped with the neighbouring parishes of Angerton and Dunnerdale-with-Seathwaite under Duddon Parish Council. South Lakeland was abolished in 2023 when the new Westmorland and Furness Council was created, also taking over the functions of the abolished Cumbria County Council in the area.

== Geography ==
It lies near the River Duddon, just inland from the coastal hamlet of Foxfield. Duddon Mosses is a site of special scientific interest with deer, lizards, adders and barn owls.

With just 549 residents at the 2021 census, Broughton-in-Furness is the smallest town in the ceremonial county of Cumbria.

== Economy ==
Traditionally the economy was based on fishing and agriculture; there is a regular livestock market. The creation of the National Park in the 1950s produced some tourism for the area, there is a Tourist Information Centre located in the main square.

== Culture and community ==
The Victory Hall has been recently refurbished with Lottery funding and puts on plays and musical events. The town contains, amongst other shops, a Post Office/newsagents, a grocer/butcher, a bakery and a number of pubs/restaurants.

The central obelisk in the town square was constructed to mark the Jubilee of King George III in 1810. Syke House on the western approach is an attractive listed building with datestones of 1655 and 1740.

There is a thriving tennis club with two outdoor courts and there is sailing on Coniston Water. Eccle Riggs is a Victorian manor house to the south of town that is now a leisure club.

== Media ==
Local television news programmes are BBC North West Tonight and ITV Granada Reports. Local radio stations are BBC Radio Cumbria, Heart North West, Smooth Lake District, and Cando FM, a community-based station. The town's local newspapers are the North West Evening Mail and The Westmorland Gazette.

== Transport ==
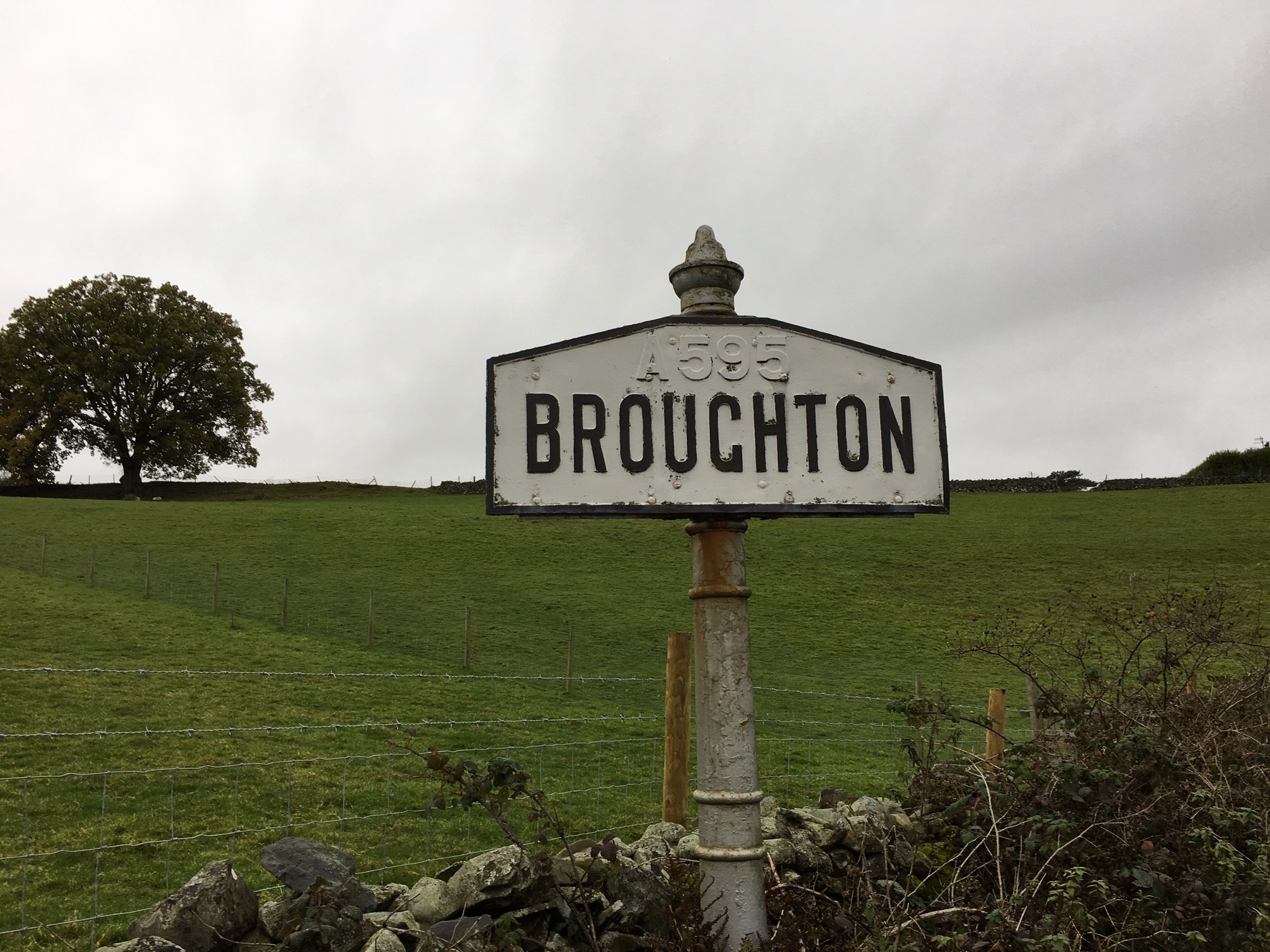
Signage on C5009 into Broughton-in-Furness with the old A595 designation still visible

The Furness Railway opened the line from Kirkby to Broughton station in 1848; the Whitehaven and Furness Junction Railway - which amalgamated with the Furness Railway in 1866 - opened its line from Whitehaven into Foxfield station in 1850. In 1859, the nominally independent Coniston Railway - which amalgamated with the Furness Railway in 1862 - extended the line through Broughton to Coniston. Nearly 100 years after the opening of the Coniston line, in 1958, the line closed to passengers, goods traffic continuing until 1962, at which point the line was closed and dismantled, the route of which is now a public bridleway for approximately 1.3 miles (2.1 km) towards Coniston. Broughton's nearest railway station is now Foxfield railway station, 2 miles (3.2 km) south west of the town.

The main west-coast road, the A595, used to pass through Broughton until the road along Duddon Mosses through Foxfield was designated as the A595. The stretch of road through Broughton has been designated the number C5009, although A595 can still be seen on older road signage.

== Education ==
There is a Church of England primary school in the town. The old school house, now a private residence, can still be seen on Church Street, close to the pathway to the church.

There are no secondary schools in Broughton with children usually attending John Ruskin School in Coniston, Ulverston Victoria High School or Windermere School. Young people frequently travel to Barrow-in-Furness to attend Furness College and Barrow Sixth Form College from the age of 16.

== Church ==
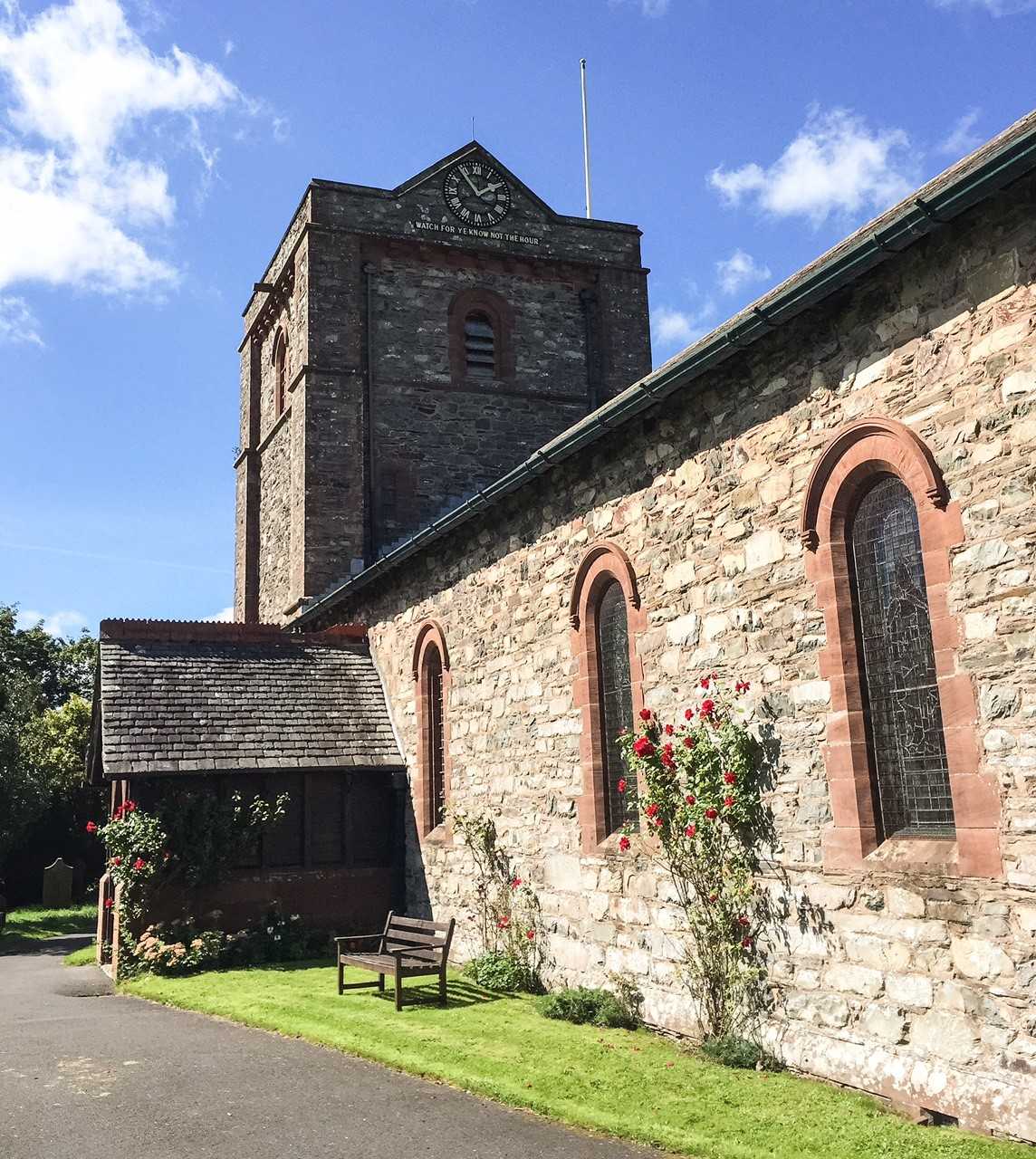
St Mary Magdalene's Church, Broughton-in-Furness

The Anglican church dedicated to St Mary Magdalene has its roots in Saxon times but the oldest part of the current building dates to the 12th century.

It is an active Anglican parish church in the deanery of Furness, the archdeaconry of Westmorland and Furness, and the diocese of Carlisle. Its benefice is united with those of four other local parishes. The church is recorded in the National Heritage List for England as a designated Grade II listed building.

== Notable people ==
- Richard Parsons is the author of a series of best-selling GCSE study guides.
- Sir Robin Philipson (1916–1992) was born in the town.
- Branwell Brontë, brother of the famous literary sisters, lived in Broughton for six months in 1840.
- R. A. Cross, 1st Viscount Cross of Broughton-in-Furness (created 1886) was, amongst other Government Appointments, Home Secretary from 1874 to 1880, and from 1885 to 1886.

== See also ==
- Listed buildings in Broughton West
- Local Government Act 1972
- Cumbria County Council
- South Lakeland
- Barrow and Furness (UK Parliament constituency)
