= St Mary Magdalene's Church, Broughton-in-Furness =

Coordinates: 54.2760°N 3.2157°W

St Mary Magdalene's Church
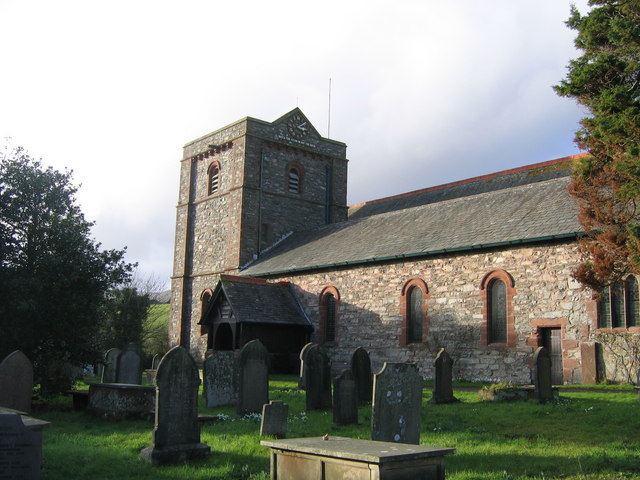
- St Mary Magdalene's Church from the southeast

- Location in South Lakeland Location in Cumbria
- OS grid reference: SD 209,874
- Location: Broughton-in-Furness, Cumbria
- Country: England
- Denomination: Anglican
- Website: St Mary Magdalene, Broughton-in-Furness

History
- Status: Parish church
- Dedication: Mary Magdalene

Architecture
- Functional status: Active
- Heritage designation: Grade II
- Designated: 5 March 1990
- Architect(s): Paley and Austin, Austin and Paley
- Architectural type: Church

Specifications
- Materials: Stone, slate roofs

Administration
- Province: York
- Diocese: Carlisle
- Archdeaconry: Westmorland and Furness
- Deanery: Furness
- Parish: Broughton and Duddon

Clergy
- Priest: Revd Stephen Tudway

St Mary Magdalene's Church is in Broughton-in-Furness, Cumbria, England. It is an active Anglican parish church in the deanery of Furness, the archdeaconry of Westmorland and Furness, and the diocese of Carlisle. Its benefice is united with those of four other local parishes. The church, dedicated to Jesus' companion Mary Magdalene, is recorded in the National Heritage List for England as a designated Grade II listed building.

== History ==
The oldest fabric in the present church is the late Norman south doorway, dating from the 12th century. Alterations and additions were made to the church in the 16th and the 19th centuries. In 1873–74 the church was restored by the Lancaster architects Paley and Austin. This included rebuilding the nave, restoring the chancel and adding a new aisle. They removed the west gallery and reseated the body of the church. Stone from St Bees was used for the external dressings, and the interior was faced with Runcorn sandstone. In 1900 the south west tower was replaced by Austin and Paley, the successors of Paley and Austin. The funds for the improvement were provided by Lord Cross who also donated a peal of bells.

== Architecture ==
The church is constructed in stone rubble with ashlar dressings, and has slate roofs. Its plan consists of a five-bay nave, a three-bay chancel, a south aisle, a south porch, and a southwest tower. The windows and bell openings are round-headed, following the style of the Norman doorway. The tower is in three stages, with buttresses and a corbel table. At its summit are a coped parapet and gablets to the east and west. The bell openings are louvred. Internally, the arcade is carried on round piers. In the aisle is a restored piscina. The stained glass includes works by Kempe, Shrigley and Hunt, and by William Morris, (designed by Burne-Jones).

== External features ==
In the churchyard to the south of the church are three more Grade II listed buildings. The sundial is possibly the stump of a medieval churchyard cross. The Atkinson monument consists of a headstone dated 1805. Also to the south of the church is a group of four tombs dating from the late 18th and early 19th centuries. There is a ring of 12 bells in the tower. Originally a ring of 8, they were augmented to 10 and later to 12.

== See also ==
- Listed buildings in Broughton West
- List of ecclesiastical works by Paley and Austin
- List of ecclesiastical works by Austin and Paley (1895–1914)
