= Bank End =

Village in Cumbria, England

Coordinates: 54.287°N 3.232°W

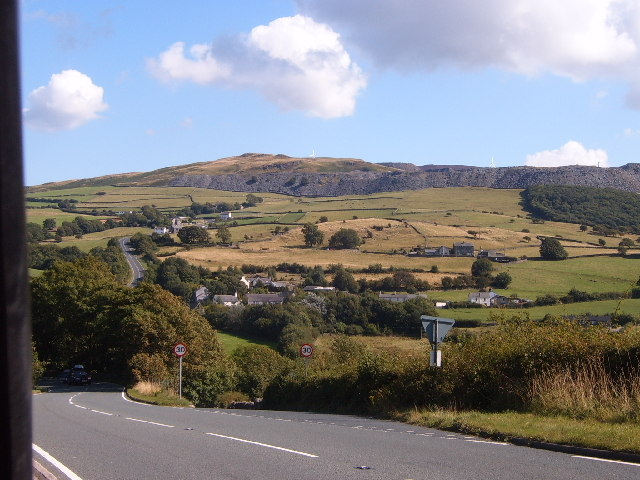
- A view of Bank End from the road

- Location in South Lakeland Location within Cumbria
- OS grid reference: SD1988
- Civil parish: Broughton West
- Unitary authority: Westmorland and Furness
- Ceremonial county: Cumbria
- Region: North West
- Country: England
- Sovereign state: United Kingdom
- Post town: BROUGHTON-IN-FURNESS
- Postcode district: LA20
- Dialling code: 01229
- Police: Cumbria
- Fire: Cumbria
- Ambulance: North West
- UK Parliament: Barrow and Furness

Bank End is a village in Cumbria, England.
