= Dunnerdale-with-Seathwaite =

Civil parish in Cumbria, England

Coordinates: 54.355°N 3.188°W

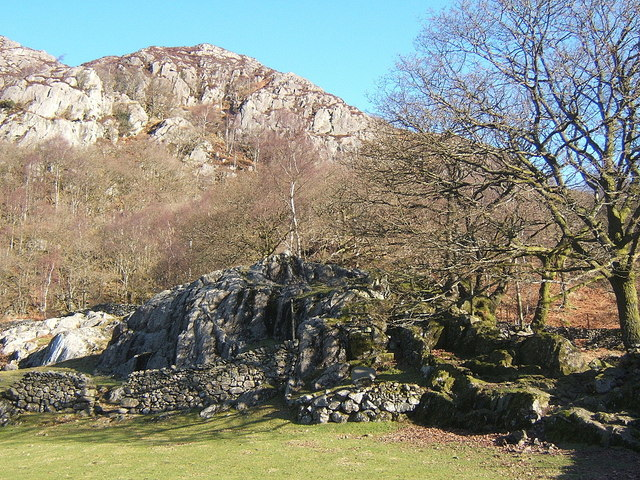
- Hollin House Tongue

- Location within Cumbria
- Population: 109 (Parish, 2021)
- OS grid reference: SD2296
- Civil parish: Dunnerdale-with-Seathwaite
- Unitary authority: Westmorland and Furness
- Ceremonial county: Cumbria
- Region: North West
- Country: England
- Sovereign state: United Kingdom
- Post town: BROUGHTON IN FURNESS
- Postcode district: LA20
- Dialling code: 01229
- Police: Cumbria
- Fire: Cumbria
- Ambulance: North West
- UK Parliament: Barrow and Furness

Dunnerdale-with-Seathwaite is a civil parish in the Westmorland and Furness district of Cumbria, England. It includes the village of Seathwaite and the hamlets of Cockley Beck, Hall Dunnerdale and Hoses. Dunnerdale is an alternative name for the Duddon Valley, and the parish covers the part of the valley east of the River Duddon. The parish is located 6.2 miles (10.0 km) north of Broughton in Furness, 34.0 miles (54.7 km) west of Kendal and 57.3 miles (92.2 km) south of Carlisle.

== History ==
Dunnerdale-with-Seathwaite was historically a township in the ancient parish of Kirkby Ireleth, which formed part of the Lonsdale Hundred of Lancashire. The township took on civil functions under the poor laws from the 17th century onwards. As such, the township also became a civil parish in 1866, when the legal definition of 'parish' was changed to be the areas used for administering the poor laws.

When elected parish and district councils were created under the Local Government Act 1894, Dunnerdale-with-Seathwaite was included in the Ulverston Rural District, which was renamed North Lonsdale Rural District in 1960. North Lonsdale Rural District was abolished in 1974, and Dunnerdale-with-Seathwaite became part of the South Lakeland district in the new county of Cumbria. In 1976, Dunnerdale-with-Seathwaite was placed under a grouped parish council covering the three parishes of Angerton, Dunnerdale-with-Seathwaite, and Broughton West. South Lakeland was abolished in 2023 when the new Westmorland and Furness Council was created, also taking over the functions of the abolished Cumbria County Council in the area.

== Governance ==
There are two tiers of local government covering Dunnerdale-with-Seathwaite, at parish and unitary authority level: Duddon Parish Council and Westmorland and Furness Council. The parish council is a grouped parish council, covering the three parishes of Angerton, Broughton West, and Dunnerdale-with-Seathwaite. The parish council meets at the Victory Hall in Broughton-in-Furness.

== Demography ==
At the 2021 census, the parish had a population of 109. At the 2001 census population was 129, and at the 2011 census it was 119.

== See also ==
- Listed buildings in Dunnerdale-with-Seathwaite
