= The Excursion =

Long poem by William Wordsworth

The Excursion: Being a portion of The Recluse, a poem is a long poem by Romantic poet William Wordsworth, first published in 1814 (see 1814 in poetry). The poem is a conversational dialogue among archetypal characters.

Wordsworth's letters suggest that the poem was intended to be the second installment of The Recluse, an unfinished multi-work poem that began with The Prelude, Wordsworth's other long poem, which was mailed to members of Wordsworth's circle, and eventually published posthumously in various versions (1798, 1805, 1850). The dating of its composition is uncertain, but the first manuscript is generally considered to have been dated either September 1806 or December 1809, with early notes being written in the margins of Samuel Taylor Coleridge's Poems on Various Subjects.

== Historical background ==
The Excursion was written at a moment of Wordsworth's unpopularity in England. With the semi-success of Lyrical Ballads, Wordsworth hoped to continue his working relationship with Coleridge. Seeing the deathly consequences of the French Revolution, Coleridge wanted Wordsworth, his favorite poet, to write the work that would deliver Englishmen from their "torpid stupor" and reenliven their revolutionary spirit. Wordsworth, all but refusing Coleridge's herculean agenda, composes The Excursion instead.

Fleeing to Malta to detox from his opium habit, Coleridge does his best to avoid dealing with Wordsworth's many letters asking for comments on manuscript drafts. Begging Coleridge for any notes at all, Wordsworth exclaims that he would go destitute for just a single line edit. Coleridge cooly writes that all of his notes were given to a plague-ridden man who drowned in the Aegean Sea. Their friendship would scarcely survive the decade. When finally reading The Excursion, Coleridge delivers backhanded praise through Lady Beaumont before excoriating the poem for the very same reasons that he has praised The Prelude, leaving Wordsworth perplexed at his "comparative censure."

Wordsworth also struggled to find a publisher for the poem, and was forced to put up one-third of the printing costs himself. As a result, Wordsworth was able to set the price of the poem at 33 GBP, making it the most expensive book printed to date in English. Scholar William St. Clair estimates that the poem cost as much as 100 large hogs. Dozens of copies were remaindered and burned after low sales figures.

== Major characters ==
The Poet - the narrator of the poem. The poem never calls this character "The Poet," but the scholarly convention has bestowed this name upon the poetic persona.

The Wanderer - first introduced in Book 1, "The Wanderer." Contrary to what his title might suggest, he dwells in a fixed abode but "still he loved to pace the public roads / And the wild paths; and, when the summer's warmth / Invited him, would often leave his home / And journey far, revisiting those scenes" (1.416-420)

The Solitary - plagued by the death of his wife and children, as well as by his disenchantment with the French Revolution, the Solitary has chosen to live alone, wanting no more connection with the social world that has brought him so much pain. The only book in his hovel is a Voltaire novel.

The Pastor - A country pastor who is encountered by the Poet, the Wanderer, and the Solitary during their excursion.

== Arrangement of the poem ==
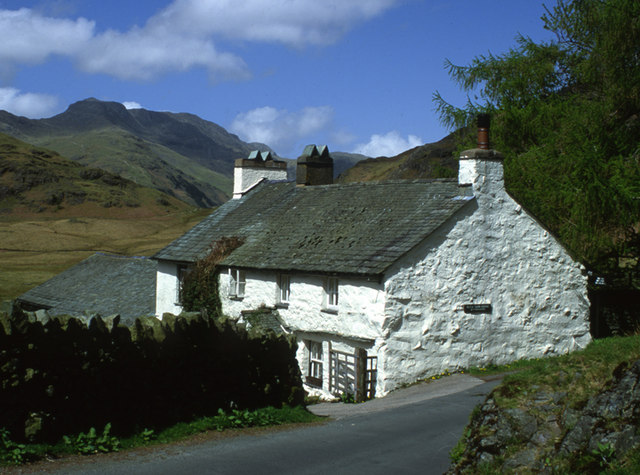
Blea Tarn House, believed to be the house described in The Solitary

The poem is arranged into nine books: "The Wanderer"; "The Solitary"; "Despondency"; "Despondency Corrected"; "The Pastor"; "The Churchyard Among the Mountains"; "The Churchyard Among the Mountains, continued"; "The Parsonage"; "Discourse of the Wanderer, &c.". The first and second books introduce the characters of the Wanderer and the Solitary, respectively. The third and fourth books consist of a conversation/debate between the Wanderer and the Solitary regarding the truth of Religion and the virtue of Mankind. The fifth, sixth, seventh, and eighth books introduce the character of the Pastor and consist largely of the Pastor explaining the life stories of many of the townspeople who lie buried in the country-churchyard. In the final two books, all of the aforementioned characters travel to the Parsonage, are introduced to the family of the Pastor, and eventually part ways.
