= Ulpha =

Village and civil parish in Cumbria, England

Coordinates: 54.331°N 3.233°W

- Village and parish
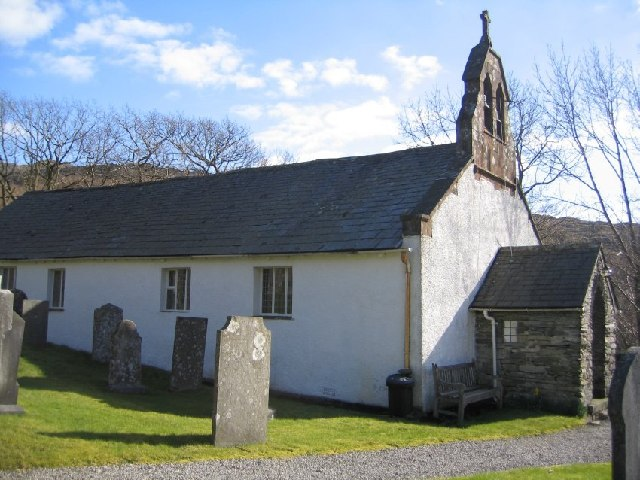
- St. Johns Church, Ulpha

- Location in the former Copeland Borough Location within Cumbria
- Population: 128 (2011)
- OS grid reference: SD198935
- Civil parish: Ulpha
- Unitary authority: Cumberland
- Ceremonial county: Cumbria
- Region: North West
- Country: England
- Sovereign state: United Kingdom
- Post town: BROUGHTON-IN-FURNESS
- Postcode district: LA20
- Dialling code: 01229
- Police: Cumbria
- Fire: Cumbria
- Ambulance: North West
- UK Parliament: Barrow and Furness

Ulpha is a small village and civil parish in the Duddon Valley in the Lake District National Park in Cumbria, England. Historically in Cumberland, it forms part of the Cumberland unitary authority area. At Ulpha a road leaves the Duddon Valley to cross Birker Fell to the valley of Eskdale. In the 2001 census the parish had a population of 159, reducing at the 2011 Census to 128.

The name Ulpha is believed to have originated with the meaning of 'hill frequented by wolves'. The name was derived from the Old Norse words ulfr meaning wolves and haugr meaning hill.

== See also ==
- Listed buildings in Ulpha
- Listed buildings in Dunnerdale-with-Seathwaite
