= River Duddon =

River in England

Duddon
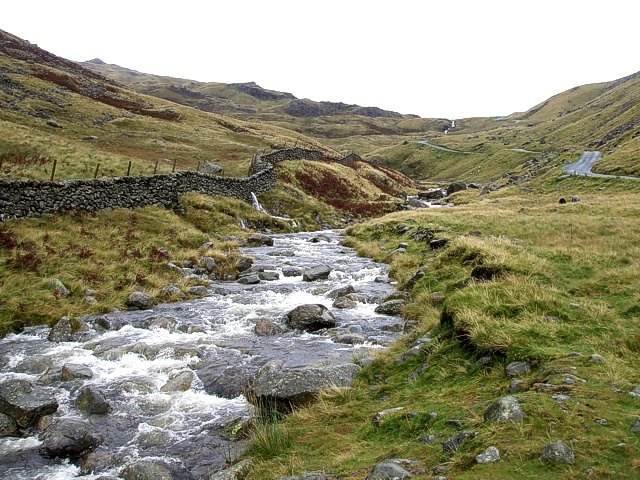
- The Duddon flowing down Wrynose Pass

Location
- Country: England
- Region: Cumbria

Physical characteristics
- Source
  - location: southern slopes of Pike of Blisco
  - coordinates: 54.4196°N 3.1168°W
  - elevation: 500 m (1,600 ft)
- Mouth: Irish Sea
  - location: Duddon Sands
  - coordinates: 54.1700°N 3.3250°W
  - elevation: 0 m (0 ft)
- Length: 43 km (27 mi)

The Duddon is a river of north-west England. It rises at a point 1,289 feet (393 m) above sea level near the Three Shire Stone at the highest point of Wrynose Pass (grid reference NY277028). The river descends to the sea over a course of about 15 miles (24 km) before entering the Irish Sea at the Duddon Sands. In total, from source to the westernmost part of Duddon Sands, its length is 43 kilometres (27 mi). For its entire length the Duddon forms the boundary between the historic counties of Lancashire and Cumberland and since local government re-organisation in 1974 the Duddon has been in the ceremonial county of Cumbria.

The catchment area of the River Duddon includes a substantial part of the south-western Lake District fells, including the eastern slopes of Corney Fell, Ulpha Fell and Harter Fell; the southern slopes of the mountains around the head of Langdale, and the western slopes of Dunnerdale and Seathwaite Fells.

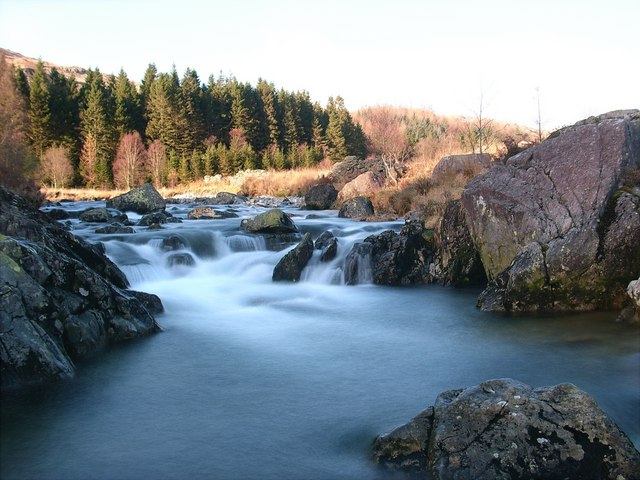
A small waterfall upstream of Birks Bridge

From its source the Duddon falls rapidly over a distance of two miles (3.2 km) to Cockley Beck at the head of Dunnerdale. Close to the hamlet of Seathwaite the Tarn Beck from Seathwaite Tarn is subsumed. The river then takes a south-westerly direction to Ulpha Bridge. Passing under the Duddon Valley road, the river assumes a southerly course to Duddon Bridge where it is crossed by the A595 trunk road. After about a mile (1.6 km) the Duddon becomes tidal as it opens into the Duddon Estuary between Furness and south-west Cumberland.

== Literary associations ==
- The River Duddon and the Duddon Estuary have figured prominently in the work of the Cumbrian poet Norman Nicholson, who said of the river valley that “Without hesitation this is my favourite place of all. There is such variety, such texture”.
- Arthur Ransome figured the valley under the name ‘Dundale’ in his Lake novels.
- The poet William Wordsworth wrote extensively of the Duddon, a river he knew and loved from his early years. He wrote his lyric sequence "The River Duddon, A Series of Sonnets" between 1804 and 1820. This sequence first appeared in The River Duddon, A Series of Sonnets: Vaudracour and Julia: And Other Poems. To which is annexed a Topographical Description of the Country of the Lakes in the North of England in April 1820, and later in Wordsworth's Miscellaneous Poems in July 1820. (Although it was first published as a series of 33 sonnets, the Duddon series was expanded to 34 sonnets in the Poetical Works of 1827.)

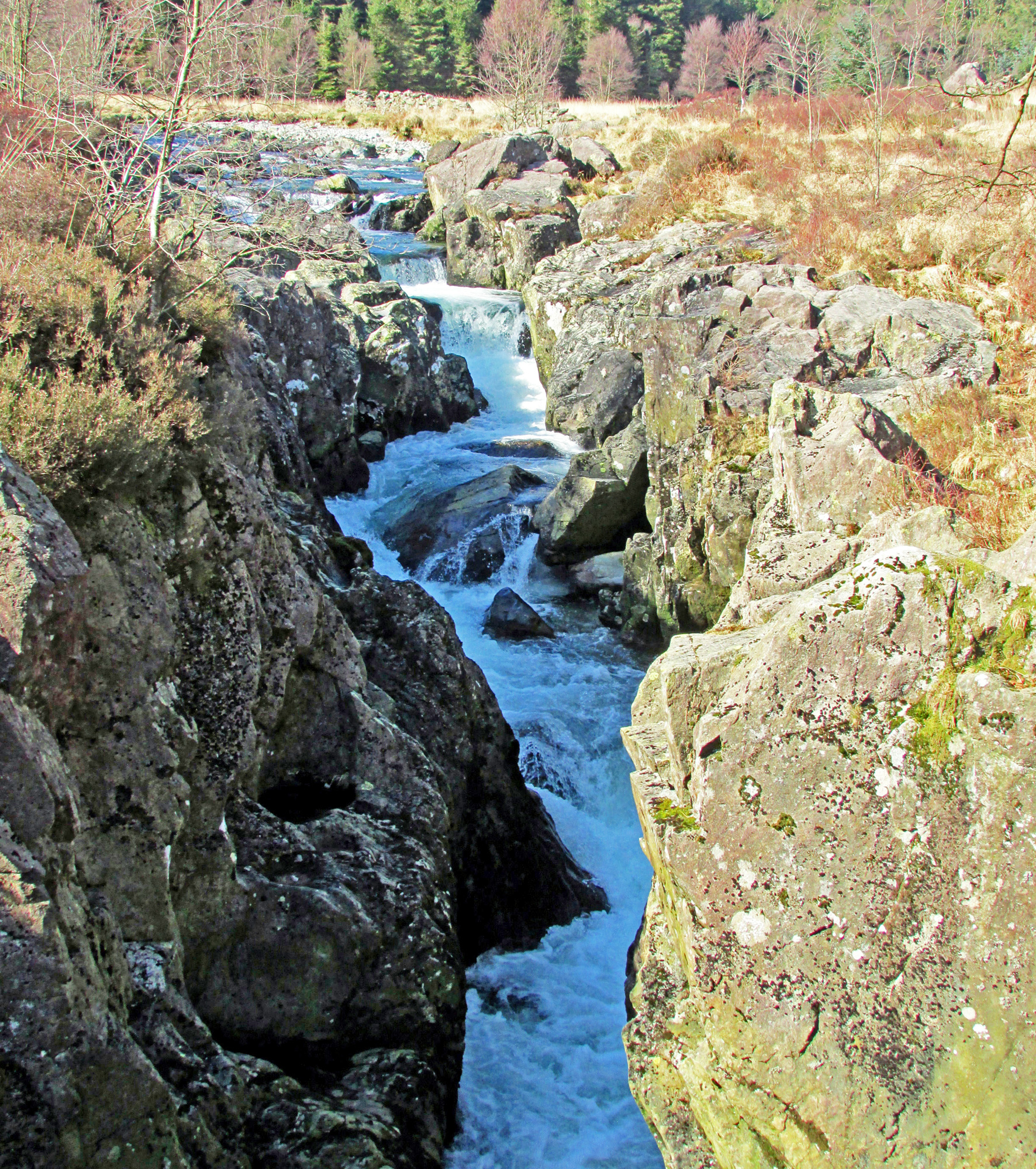
The Duddon at Troutal Gorge above Seathwaite

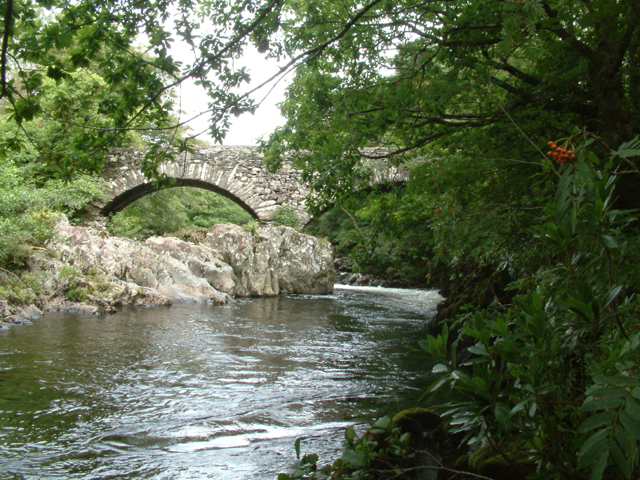
Rawfold Bridge on the Duddon

Sonnet I.

NOT envying shades which haply yet may throw
A grateful coolness round that rocky spring,
Bandusia, once responsive to the string
Of the Horatian lyre with babbling flow;
Careless of flowers that in perennial blow
Round the moist marge of Persian fountains cling;
Heedless of Alpine torrents thundering
Through icy portals radiant as heaven’s bow;
I seek the birth-place of a native Stream.—
All hail, ye mountains! hail, thou morning light!
Better to breathe at large on this aëry height
Than toil in needless sleep from dream to dream;
Pure flow the verse, pure, vigorous, free, and bright,
For Duddon, long-loved Duddon, is my theme!

Subsequent sonnets followed the river downstream, past Birks Bridge (Sonnet XI), to Ulpha (Sonnet XXII), before reaching “the Deep...over smooth flat sands” with Sonnet XXXII.

== Recreation ==
The River Duddon is a salmon fishery. The section of the river downstream from Seathwaite is popular with canoeists and is graded as 3 with some easy 4. From Birks Bridge, through Troutal Gorge to Seathwaite there are some difficult canoeing sections graded at 5 requiring higher water levels to navigate.

Many parts of the Duddon Valley are visited by tourists, but the location is outside the main tourist area of the Lake District. Consequently, most of the visitors are day trippers who live locally, or who travel from elsewhere in northern England: Hunter Davies considered its unfrequented nature one of its great attractions.

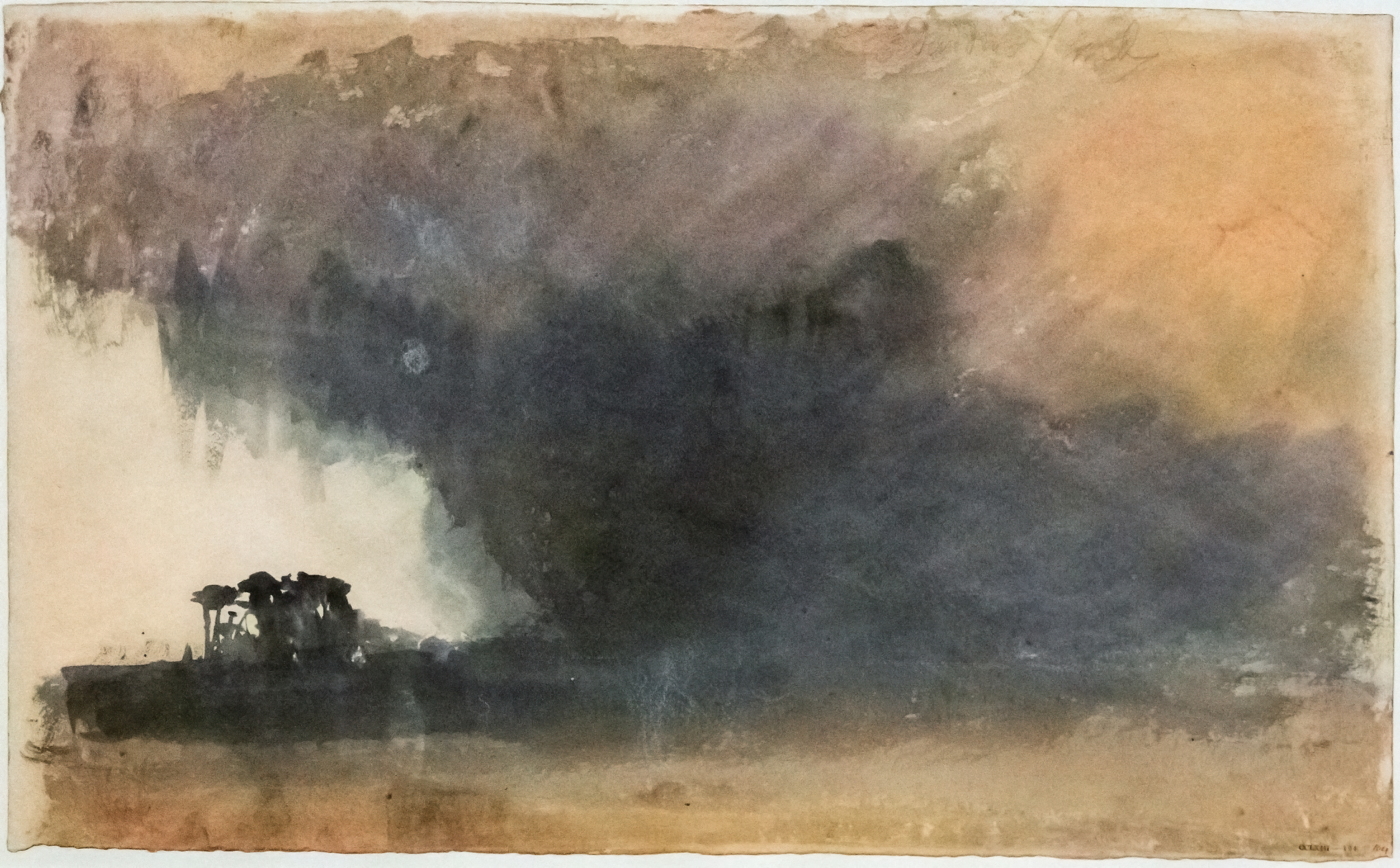
Duddon Sands, Cumbria - William Turner

== Duddon in art ==
- Duddon Sands, Cumbria by William Turner in Tate Britain

== See also ==
- Hardknott Roman Fort
- Wonderful Walker
