= St. John's Church =

St. John's Church, Church of St. John, St John's Anglican Church, Church of St John the Evangelist, or variants, may refer to the following churches, former churches or other places:

== Armenia ==
- Church of Saint John, Mastara

== Australia ==
- St John's Anglican Church, Darlinghurst, Sydney, New South Wales
- St John's Anglican Church, Salisbury, Adelaide, South Australia
- St John's Anglican Church, Wentworth, New South Wales
- St John's Uniting Church, Neutral Bay, Sydney, New South Wales
- St John's Uniting Church, Wahroonga, Sydney, New South Wales
- St John's Church, Adelaide, South Australia
- St John's Church, Launceston, Tasmania
- St John's Church, Mundoolun, Queensland
- St John's the Less Anglican Church, a former church and schoolhouse in East Brighton, Victoria
- St John's, Ashfield, Sydney, New South Wales

== Barbados ==
- St. John's Parish Church, Barbados

== Belgium ==
- Church of St John the Evangelist, Liège

== Brunei ==
- St John's Church, Kuala Belait

== Canada ==
- St. John's, York Mills

== China ==
- St John's Church, Chengdu
- St. John's Church, Fuzhou
- St. John's Church, Suzhou

== Denmark ==
- St. John's Church, Aarhus
- St. John's Church, Copenhagen

== Estonia ==
- St. John's Church, Tartu
- St. John's Church, Tallinn

== Finland ==
- St John's Church, Hauho
- St. John's Church, Helsinki
- St. John's Church, Tampere

== Germany ==
- American Church of St. John, Dresden
- Meissen Cathedral, Church of St John and St Donatus
- Neustädter Kirche, Hanover (Neustädter Kirche St. Johannis)
- St. Johannes Evangelist, Cappenberg
- St. John's Church, Leipzig
- St. John's Church, Lüneburg

== India ==
- St. John in the Wilderness Church (Dharamshala)
- St. John's Church, Meerut
- St. John's Church, Kolkata
- St. John's Church, Secunderabad
- St. John's Church, Midnapore
- St. John's Church, Gorakhpur

== Iran ==
- St. John the Baptist Church, New Julfa

== Ireland ==
- Church of Saint John the Evangelist, Kilkenny
- Church of Our Lady and St John, Inishmaan, Aran Islands
- St. John's Church, Ballinasloe
- St. John's Church, Ballymore Eustace

== Italy ==
- Archbasilica of Saint John Lateran, Rome

== Latvia ==
- St. John's Church, Riga

== Lithuania ==
- Church of St. Johns, Vilnius

== Luxembourg ==
- St. John's Church, Luxembourg, location of a Black Madonna

== Netherlands ==
- Sint Janskerk or St. John's Church, Gouda
- Janskerk, Haarlem or St. John's Church
- St. John's Cathedral ('s-Hertogenbosch)

== New Zealand ==
- Old St John's Church, Te Awamutu
- St John's Anglican Church, Trentham, Wellington
- St John's Church, Arrowtown
- St John's Church, Wakefield
- St John's Church, Wellington

== Norway ==
- St John's Church, Bergen

== Pakistan ==
- St. John's Church (Jhelum)

== Romania ==
- Saint John's Church, Sibiu

== Russia ==
- St. John's Church (Saint Petersburg)
- Chesme Church or Church of Saint John at Chesme Palace
- Church of St. John the Warrior, Moscow

== Saint Helena ==
- Saint John's Church, Jamestown

== South Korea ==
- St. John's Church, Seongnam

== Sweden ==
- Saint John's Church, Habo
- St. John's Church, Malmö
- St. John's Church, Stockholm

== Switzerland ==
- Stadtpfarrkirche Rapperswil or Stadtpfarrkirche St. Johann
- Münster Schaffhausen or parish of St. Johann Schaffhausen Münster

== Turkey ==
- Saint John's Church, Gülşehir
- St. John's Cathedral (İzmir)

== United Kingdom ==
=== England ===
==== Birmingham ====
- St John's Church, Sparkhill

==== Buckinghamshire ====
- St. Mary's & St John's, Bletchley

==== Cambridgeshire ====
- St John's Church, Duxford
- St John the Baptist's Church, Papworth St Agnes
- St John the Baptist's Church, Parson Drove

==== Cheshire ====
- St John the Baptist's Church, Aldford
- St John the Evangelist's Church, Alvanley
- St John the Evangelist's Church, Ashton Hayes
- St John's Church, Burwardsley
- St John the Evangelist's Church, Chelford
- St John the Baptist's Church, Chester
- St John's Church, Cotebrook
- St John's Church, Doddington
- St John the Baptist's Church, Guilden Sutton
- St John's Church, Hartford
- St John's Church, High Legh
- St John the Evangelist's Church, Kingsley
- St John the Baptist's Church, Knutsford
- St John the Evangelist's Church, Norley
- St John the Evangelist's Church, Sandbach Heath
- St John the Evangelist's Church, Sandiway
- St John's Church, Threapwood
- St John the Evangelist's Church, Toft
- St John the Evangelist's Church, Warrington
- St John the Evangelist's Church, Weston, Runcorn
- St John the Evangelist's Church, Winsford

==== Cornwall ====
- Church of St Morwenna and St John the Baptist, Morwenstow

==== Cumbria ====
- St John the Baptist's Church, Blawith
- St John the Evangelist's Church, Crosscanonby
- St John the Evangelist's Church, Cowgill
- St John's Church, Hutton Roof
- St John's Church, Gamblesby, decommissioned
- St John the Evangelist's Church, Newton Arlosh
- St John the Evangelist's Church, Osmotherley
- St John's Church, St John's in the Vale
- St John the Evangelist's Church, Woodland
- St John's Church, Workington

==== Derbyshire ====
- St John the Baptist's Chapel, Matlock Bath

==== Dorset ====
- St John's Church, Tolpuddle

==== County Durham ====
- St John's Church, Darlington

==== East Sussex ====
- St John the Baptist's Church, Brighton
- St John the Evangelist Church, Heron's Ghyll
- St John the Baptist's Church, Hove
- St John the Evangelist's Church, Preston Village, Brighton
- St John the Evangelist's Church, St Leonards-on-Sea
- Church of St John sub Castro, Lewes

==== Hampshire ====
- St John's Church, Hedge End
- Church of St John the Baptist, Upper Eldon
- St. John the Baptist Church, Winchester

==== Herefordshire ====
- St John the Baptist's Church, Llanrothal

==== Hertfordshire ====
- St John's Church, Letty Green

==== Isle of Wight ====
- St John's Church, Oakfield, Ryde
- St John's Church, Wroxall

==== Kent ====
- St John the Evangelist, Kingsdown

==== Lancashire ====
- Church of St John the Evangelist, Poulton-le-Fylde
- St John the Baptist's Church, Arkholme
- St John's Church, Blackpool
- St John the Baptist's Church, Bretherton
- St John the Baptist Church, Burscough
- St John the Evangelist's Church, Clifton
- St John the Evangelist's Church, Crawshawbooth
- St John's Church, Ellel
- St John's Church, Great Harwood
- St John the Evangelist's Church, Gressingham
- St John the Evangelist's Church, Lancaster
- St John's Church, Lytham
- Church of St John the Divine, Morecambe
- St John's Minster, Preston
- Old St John the Baptist's Church, Pilling
- St John the Baptist's Church, Pilling
- St John's Church, Rawtenstall
- St John's Church, Silverdale
- St John the Evangelist's Church, Turncroft
- St John the Baptist's Church, Tunstall
- St John the Evangelist's Church, Worsthorne
- St John the Evangelist's Church, Yealand Conyers

==== Lincolnshire ====
- St John the Baptist's Church, Burringham
- St John the Baptist's Church, Stamford
- St John the Baptist's Church, Sutterby
- St John the Baptist's Church, Yarburgh

==== London ====
- St John's, Notting Hill
- St John's Chapel, Bedford Row
- St John's Chapel, London, Tower of London
- St John, Friern Barnet, Barnet
- St John the Evangelist Church, Brentford
- Church of St John-at-Hackney
- St John-at-Hampstead
- St John's Downshire Hill, Hampstead
- St John the Evangelist Church, Islington
- St John the Evangelist, Palmers Green
- St John's, Smith Square, a former church, now a concert hall
- St John the Evangelist, Great Stanmore
- St John's Church, Stratford
- Saint Mark's Coptic Orthodox Church (London) or St John's

==== Greater Manchester ====
- St John the Evangelist's Church, Abram
- St John's Church, Dukinfield
- St John's Church, Manchester
- St John the Divine's Church, Pemberton

==== Merseyside ====
- St John's Church, Birkdale
- St John's Church, Egremont
- St John the Evangelist's Church, Kirkdale
- St John's Church, Liverpool Central

==== Norfolk ====
- St John the Baptist's Church, Hellington
- Saint John the Baptist, Maddermarket, Norwich

==== Northamptonshire ====
- St John the Baptist's Church, Wakerley
- Church of St. John the Baptist, Achurch

==== Oxfordshire ====
- St John the Baptist's Church, Mongewell
- St John the Evangelist Church, Banbury
- St John the Evangelist Church, Oxford

==== Staffordshire ====
- St John's Church, Wolverhampton

==== Sheffield ====
- St John's Church, Ranmoor

==== Somerset ====
- Church of St John the Baptist, Axbridge
- Church of St John the Baptist, Carhampton
- Church of St John the Baptist, Churchill
- Church of St John the Baptist, Glastonbury
- Church of St John the Baptist, Hatch Beauchamp
- Church of St John the Baptist, Midsomer Norton
- Church of St John the Evangelist, Milborne Port
- Church of St John the Baptist, Pawlett
- Church of St John the Baptist, Pilton
- Church of St John the Baptist, Wellington

==== Staffordshire ====
- St John's Church, Essington

==== Suffolk ====
- St John the Baptist's Church, Stanton

==== Surrey ====
- St John's Church, Egham

==== Tyne and Wear ====
- St John's Church, Gateshead Fell

==== Warwickshire ====
- St John the Baptist's Church, Avon Dassett

==== West Sussex ====
- St John the Evangelist's Church, Burgess Hill
- St John the Evangelist's Church, Chichester
- St John the Baptist's Church, Crawley

==== Wiltshire ====
- St John the Baptist Church, Inglesham
- St John's Church, Warminster

==== Worcestershire ====
- St John the Baptist's Church, Strensham

==== Yorkshire ====
- St John the Evangelist's Church, Cadeby, South Yorkshire
- St John and All Saints' Church, Easingwold, North Yorkshire
- St John the Evangelist's Church, Leeds, West Yorkshire
- St John's Church, Middlesbrough, North Yorkshire
- St John the Baptist's Church, Stanwick, North Yorkshire
- St John's Church, Throapham, South Yorkshire
- Church of St John the Divine, Calder Grove, West Yorkshire
- St John's Church, Allerston, North Yorkshire
- St John's Church, Cononley, North Yorkshire

=== Scotland ===
- Church of St John the Evangelist, Edinburgh
- St John's Renfield Church, Glasgow
- St John the Evangelist's Church, Greenock

=== Wales ===
- St John's Church, Aberdare, Rhondda Cynon Taff
- St John's Church, Abergavenny, Monmouthshire (now a masonic lodge)
- St John the Baptist Church, Cardiff
- St John's Church, Dowlais, Merthyr Tyfil County Borough
- St John the Baptist's Church, Old Colwyn, Denbighshire
- St John's Church, Trofarth, Conwy County Borough

== United States ==
=== California ===
- St. John's Presbyterian Church (Berkeley, California)
- St. John's Presbyterian Church (San Francisco, California)

=== Connecticut ===
- St. John Church (Darien, Connecticut)

=== Georgia ===
- St. John's Church (Savannah, Georgia)

=== Indiana ===
- St. John the Evangelist Catholic Church (Indianapolis)

=== Iowa ===
- St. John's United Methodist Church (Davenport, Iowa)
- Basilica of St. John (Des Moines, Iowa)
- St. John's Episcopal Church (Keokuk, Iowa)

=== Maryland ===
- St. John's Episcopal Church (Ellicott City, Maryland)
- St. John's Episcopal Church (Fort Washington, Maryland)
- Saint John's Church (Hagerstown, Maryland)
- St. John's Lutheran Church (Hagerstown, Maryland)
- St. John's Lutheran Church (Parkville, Maryland)
- St. John's Church (Ruxton, Maryland)
- St. John the Evangelist Catholic Church (Frederick, Maryland)
- St. John the Evangelist Catholic Church (Silver Spring, Maryland)

=== Massachusetts ===
- St. John's Catholic Church (Worcester, Massachusetts)

=== Michigan ===
- St. John's Lutheran Church (Port Hope, Michigan)

=== Minnesota ===
- Saint John's Abbey, Collegeville
- St. John's Lutheran Church (Northfield, Minnesota)

=== Missouri ===
- St. John's Evangelical Lutheran Church (Corning, Missouri)

=== Nebraska ===
- St. John's Parish (Omaha, Nebraska)

=== New Hampshire ===
- St. John's Church (Portsmouth, New Hampshire)

=== New Jersey ===
- St. John's Church (Newark, New Jersey)
- St. John's Church (Orange, New Jersey)
- St. John's Episcopal Church (Somerville, New Jersey)
- St. John's United Methodist Church (Hope, New Jersey)

=== New York ===
- St. John's Church Complex (Delhi, New York)
- St. John the Baptist Roman Catholic Church (Plattsburgh, New York)
- St. John's Church (Laurel Hollow, New York)
- St. John the Evangelist's Church (Pawling)
- St. John's Protestant Episcopal Church (Yonkers, New York)
- in New York City
  - St. John the Baptist Church (Manhattan)
  - St. John the Evangelist Church (Manhattan)
  - St. John the Martyr Church (New York City)
  - St. John's Church (Bronx)
  - Church of St. John Nepomucene (Manhattan)
  - St. John's Chapel (New York City)

=== North Carolina ===
- St. John's Lutheran Church (Conover, North Carolina)
- St. John's Lutheran Church (Salisbury, North Carolina)

=== Ohio ===
- Old St. John's Church (Elyria, Ohio)
- St. John's Lutheran Church (Petersburg, Ohio)
- St. John's Lutheran Church (Dublin, Ohio), a National Register of Historic Places listing in Franklin County, Ohio
- St. John's Evangelical Lutheran Church (Stovertown, Ohio)
- St. John's Lutheran Church (Zanesville, Ohio)
- St. John the Baptist Catholic Church (Canton, Ohio)

=== Pennsylvania ===
- St. John's Church (Concord, Pennsylvania)

=== South Carolina ===
- St. John's Lutheran Church (Pomaria, South Carolina)
- St. John's Lutheran Church (Walhalla, South Carolina)

=== Texas ===
- St. John's Church (Brownwood, Texas)

=== Virginia ===
- St. John's Church (Chuckatuck, Virginia)
- St. John's Church (Chula, Virginia)
- St. John's Episcopal Church (Hampton, Virginia)
- St. John's Episcopal Church (Richmond, Virginia)
- St. John's Church (Sweet Hall, Virginia)

=== Washington, D.C. ===
- St. John's Episcopal Church, Georgetown
- St. John's Episcopal Church, Lafayette Square

=== Wisconsin ===
- Saint John's Evangelical Lutheran Church (Milwaukee, Wisconsin)

== See also ==
- St John's Anglican Church (disambiguation)
- Janskerk (disambiguation), Dutch
- St. John the Baptist Church (disambiguation)
- St. John Catholic Church (disambiguation)
- St. John's Cathedral (disambiguation)
- St. John's Chapel (disambiguation)
- St. John's Episcopal Church (disambiguation)
- St. John the Evangelist Church (disambiguation)
- St. John's Parish (disambiguation)
- Church of St John the Divine (disambiguation)
