= St. John's Episcopal Church =

St. John's Episcopal Church, or variants thereof, may refer to:

== United States ==
(by state then city)

- St. John's Episcopal Church (Montgomery, Alabama)
- St. John's Episcopal Church (Globe, Arizona)
- St. John's Episcopal Church (Camden, Arkansas)
- St. John's Episcopal Church (Chico, California)
- St. John's Cathedral (Los Angeles), California
- Saint John's Episcopal Church (Wilmington, California)
- St. John's Episcopal Church (Bridgeport, Connecticut)
- St. John's Episcopal Church (East Hartford, Connecticut)
- St. John's Episcopal Church (Hartford, Connecticut)
- St. John's Episcopal Church (New Haven, Connecticut)
- St. John's Protestant Episcopal Church (Stamford, Connecticut)
- St. John's Episcopal Church (Warehouse Point, Connecticut) (East Windsor)
- St. John's Episcopal Church (West Hartford, Connecticut)
- St. John's Cathedral (Jacksonville), Florida
- St. John's Episcopal Church (Tallahassee, Florida)
- St. John's Episcopal Church (Moultrie, Georgia)
- St. John's Episcopal Church (American Falls, Idaho), NRHP-listed in Power County
- St. John's Episcopal Church (Albion, Illinois)
- Saint John's Episcopal Church (Crawfordsville, Indiana)
- St. John's Episcopal Church (Lafayette, Indiana)
- St. John's Episcopal Church (Dubuque, Iowa), contributing property
- St. John's Episcopal Church (Keokuk, Iowa)
- St. John's Episcopal Church (Abilene, Kansas)
- St. John's Episcopal Church (Girard, Kansas)
- St. John's Episcopal Church (Laurel Hill, Louisiana)
- St. John's Episcopal Church and Cemetery, Thibodaux, Louisiana
- St. John's Episcopal Church (Dresden Mills, Maine)
- St. John's Episcopal Church (Baltimore, Maryland)
- St. John's Episcopal Church, Zion Parish, in Beltsville, Maryland
- St. John's Episcopal Church (Ellicott City, Maryland)
- St. John's Episcopal Church (Fort Washington, Maryland), historic congregation formerly called Broad Creek
- Saint John's Church (Hagerstown, Maryland)
- St. John's Episcopal Church (Framingham, Massachusetts)
- St. John's Episcopal Church (Detroit)
- St. John's Episcopal Church (Mount Pleasant, Michigan)
- St. John's Episcopal Church (Saginaw, Michigan)
- Saint John's Episcopal Church (Ocean Springs, Mississippi)
- St. John's Episcopal Church (Eolia, Missouri)
- St. John's Episcopal Church (Springfield, Missouri)
- St. John's Episcopal Church (Butte, Montana)
- St. John's Church (Portsmouth, New Hampshire)
- St. John's Episcopal Church (Boonton, New Jersey)
- St. John's Episcopal Church (Dover, New Jersey)
- St. John's Episcopal Church (Elizabeth, New Jersey)
- St. John's Episcopal Church (Jersey City, New Jersey)
- St. John's Episcopal Church (Little Silver, New Jersey)
- St. John's Episcopal Church and Burying Ground, Runnymede, New Jersey
- St. John's Episcopal Church, Boquet Chapel, New York, original name of Foothills Baptist Church (Essex, New York), NRHP-listed in Essex County
- St. John's Episcopal Church (Park Slope), in Brooklyn, New York
- St. John's Episcopal Church (Cape Vincent, New York)
- St. John's Episcopal Church (Clifton Springs, New York)
- St. John's Church Complex (Delhi, New York)
- St. John's Episcopal Church (Honeoye Falls, New York)
- St. John's Episcopal Church (Johnstown, New York)
- St. John's Episcopal Church and Rectory (Monticello, New York)
- St. John's Episcopal Church (Mount Morris, New York)
- St. Johns Episcopal Church and Cemetery (Oakdale, New York)
- St. John's Episcopal Church, Canandaigua, Ontario County, New York
- St. John's Episcopal Church (Phelps, New York)
- St. John's Episcopal Church (Phoenix, New York)
- St. John's Episcopal Church (Pleasantville, New York), NRHP-listed in Westchester County
- St. John's Episcopal Church (Speedsville, New York)
- St. John's Protestant Episcopal Church (Yonkers, New York)
- St. John's Episcopal Church (Youngstown, New York)
- St. John's Episcopal Church (Battleboro, North Carolina), a property
- St. John's Episcopal Church (Fayetteville, North Carolina)
- St. John's Episcopal Church (Marion, North Carolina)
- St. John's Episcopal Church (St. John's, North Carolina)
- St. John's Episcopal Church (Williamsboro, North Carolina)
- St. John's Episcopal Church (Cleveland, Ohio)
- St. John's Episcopal Church (Worthington, Ohio)
- St. John's Episcopal Church (Youngstown, Ohio), NRHP-listed in Mahoning County
- St. John's Episcopal Church (Portland, Oregon)
- St. John's Episcopal Church (Toledo, Oregon)
- St. John's Church (Concord, Pennsylvania)
- St. John's Episcopal Church (Ashwood, Tennessee)
- St. John's Episcopal Church (Highgate Falls, Vermont)
- St. John's Church (Chuckatuck, Virginia)
- St. John's Church (Chula, Virginia)
- St. John's Episcopal Church (Hampton, Virginia)
- Saint John's Episcopal Church (Petersburg, Virginia)
- St. John's Episcopal Church (Richmond, Virginia)
- St. John's Episcopal Church (Roanoke, Virginia)
- St. John's Church (Sweet Hall, Virginia)
- St. John's Episcopal Church (Wytheville, Virginia)
- St. John's Episcopal Church (Christiansted, U.S. Virgin Islands)
- St. John's Episcopal Church, Georgetown, in Washington, D.C.
- St. John's Episcopal Church, Lafayette Square
- St. John's Episcopal Church (Olympia, Washington)
- St. John's Episcopal Church (Sparta, Wisconsin)
- St. John's Episcopal Church (Charleston, West Virginia)
- St. John's Episcopal Church and Rectory (Jackson, Wyoming)
- St. John’s Episcopal Church, also known as Zabriskie Memorial Church of Saint John the Evangelist, in Newport, Rhode Island

== Rest of the world ==
- St. John's Episcopal Church, Edinburgh, Scotland

== See also ==
- St. John's Church (disambiguation)
