= St. John's Parish =

St. John's Parish refers to the ecclesiastical parish of hundreds of churches; in secular (official governmental) use it refers to:

- St John's (Parish), Barbados
- St. John's Parish, Prince Edward Island, Canada
- St John's (Parish), Clontarf, formed in 1966

== See also ==
- Saint John Parish (disambiguation)
- St. John's Church (disambiguation)
- St. John the Baptist Church (disambiguation)
- St. John's Cathedral (disambiguation)
- St. John's Chapel (disambiguation)
- St. John's Episcopal Church (disambiguation)
- St. John the Evangelist Church (disambiguation)
