= St John's Anglican Church =

St John's Anglican Church or St. John's Anglican Church may refer to the following Anglican churches:

== Australia ==
- St John's Anglican Church, Albany, Western Australia
- St John's Anglican Church, Camden, New South Wales
- St John's Anglican Church, Dalby, Queensland
- St John's Anglican Church, Darlinghurst, New South Wales
- St John's Anglican Church, Fremantle, Western Australia
- St John's Anglican Church, Heidelberg, Victoria
- St John's Anglican Church, Highton, Victoria
- St John's Anglican Church, Newcastle, New South Wales
- St John's Anglican Church, New Town, Tasmania
- St John's Anglican Church, Rockhampton, Queensland
- St John's Anglican Church, South Townsville, Queensland
- St John's Anglican Church, Wentworth, New South Wales
- St John's Anglican Church and Macquarie Schoolhouse, Wilberforce, New South Wales
- Ss Johns' Anglican Church, Colac, Victoria

== Other countries ==
- St. John's Shaughnessy, Vancouver, Canada (Anglican Church of Canada)
- St. John's Vancouver, Vancouver, Canada (Anglican Church in North America)
- St. John's Church, Brownwood, Texas (Anglican Church in North America)
- St John's Anglican Church, Trentham, New Zealand

== See also ==
- St. John's Church (disambiguation)
