= Church of St John the Divine =

Church of St John the Divine may refer to:

- Church of St John the Divine, Brooklands, Greater Manchester
- Church of St John the Divine, Bulwell, Nottinghamshire
- Church of St John the Divine, Calder Grove, West Yorkshire
- Church of St John the Divine, Frankby, Merseyside
- Church of St John the Divine, Holme Chapel, Lancashire
- Church of St John the Divine, Morecambe, Lancashire
- St John the Divine's Church, Pemberton, Greater Manchester

== See also ==
- St. John's Church (disambiguation)
