= Saint John Parish =

Saint John Parish or Parish of St John may refer to:

- Parish of Basilica of Saint John the Baptist (Canton, Ohio)
- Parish of St John, Cumberland County, New South Wales, Australia
- Saint John, Antigua and Barbuda
- Saint John, Barbados
- Saint John Parish, Dominica
- Saint John Parish, Grenada
- Saint John Parish, Tobago, a historical municipality of Tobago
- St. John the Baptist Parish, Louisiana
- St. John the Baptist Parish (Salem, Massachusetts)

== See also ==
- St. John's Parish (disambiguation)
