= St. John Catholic Church =

St. John Catholic Church or St. John's Catholic Church, and variations, may refer to:

== Australia ==
- St John's Catholic Church, Campbelltown, New South Wales

== United States ==
(by state then city)

- St. John the Evangelist Catholic Church (Indianapolis, Indiana)
- St. John's Catholic Church (Bangor, Maine), listed on the NRHP in Maine
- St. John Catholic Church (Saint John Plantation, Maine)
- St. John's Catholic Church (Worcester, Massachusetts)
- St. John the Baptist Catholic Church (Canton, Ohio), listed on the NRHP in Ohio
- St. John's Catholic Church (Delphos, Ohio), listed on the NRHP in Ohio
- St. John's Catholic Church (Fryburg, Ohio), listed on the NRHP in Ohio
- St. John's Catholic Church (Paxton, South Dakota), listed on the NRHP in South Dakota

== South Korea ==
- St. John's Church, Seongnam, also known as St. John's Catholic Church

== Iraq ==
- St. John's the Baptist Catholic Church, Baghdad, in Hay Al-Athoriyeen district

== See also ==
- St. John's Church (disambiguation)
