= Janskerk =

Janskerk or St. John's Church may refer to:

- Sint Janskerk, Gouda, South Holland
- Janskerk, Haarlem, North Holland
- Janskerk, in Utrecht

== See also ==
- St. John's Church (disambiguation)
