= St. John's Chapel =

St. John's Chapel may refer to:

in England

- St John's Chapel, London
- St John's Chapel, Bedford Row - another London church
- St John's Chapel, County Durham - a village in County Durham
- St John's College Chapel, Cambridge

in Singapore

- St. John's Chapel, Singapore - a church located within St. Margaret's Secondary School in Farrer Road

in the United States

- St. John's Chapel (New York City), a demolished nineteenth-century Episcopal church
- St. John Chapel (Columbus, Georgia), listed on the National Register of Historic Places in Georgia
- St. John's Chapel of St. Michael's Parish, listed on the National Register of Historic Places in Maryland
- Episcopal Church of the Advent / St. John's Chapel, an Episcopal church in Cape May, New Jersey
- St. John's Chapel also known as Crocker Church in Sarasota, Florida

== See also ==
- St. John the Baptist Church (disambiguation)
- St. John's Cathedral (disambiguation)
- St. John's Church (disambiguation)
- St. John's Episcopal Church (disambiguation)
- St. John the Evangelist Church (disambiguation)
