= St. John's Episcopal Church (Highgate Falls, Vermont) =

Historic church in Vermont, United States

- U.S. National Register of Historic Places
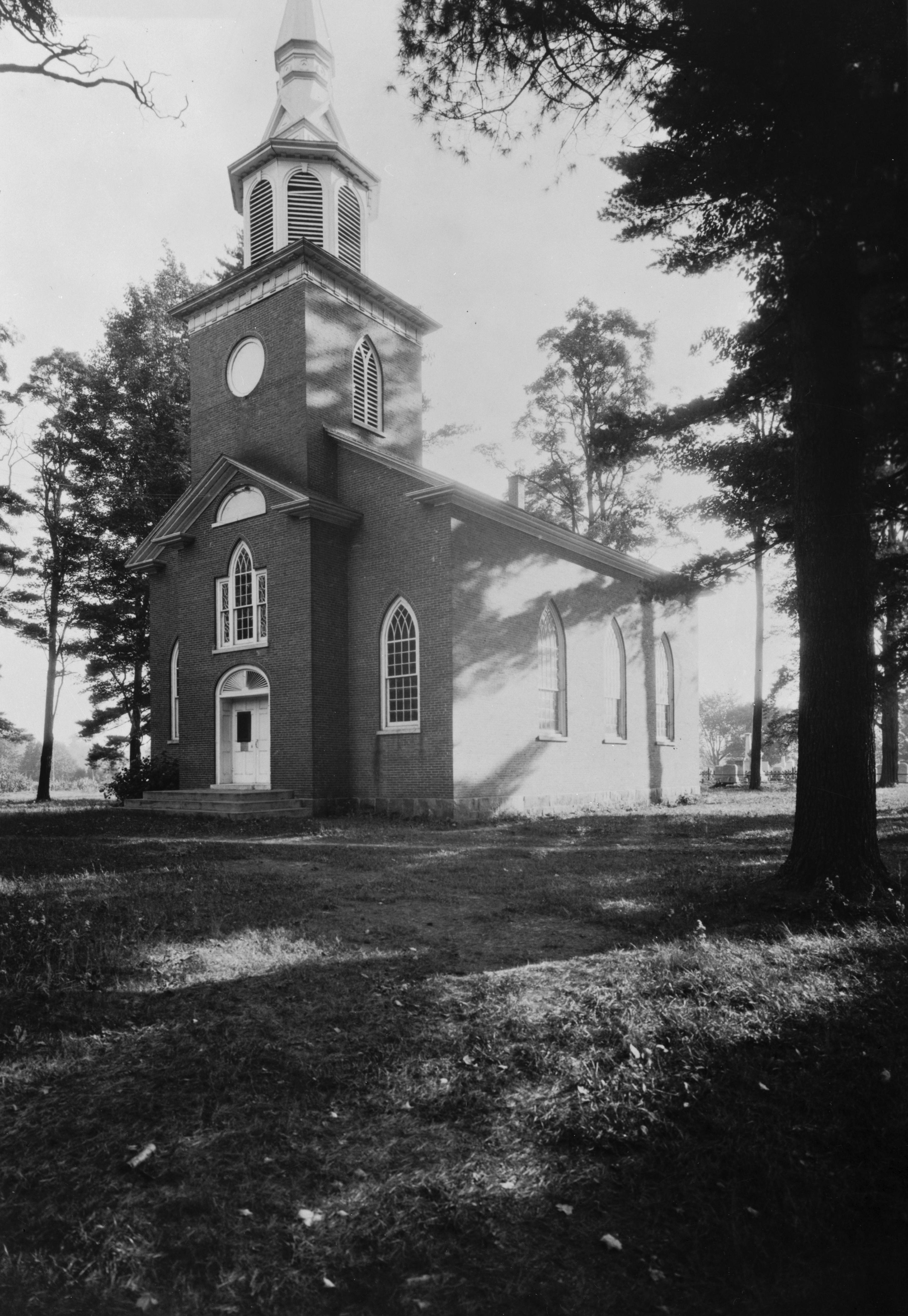
- St. John's Episcopal Church in 1940

- Location within Vermont Location within the United States
- Location: Highgate Falls Village Green, Highgate, Vermont
- Coordinates: 44°55′48″N 73°2′56″W
- Built: 1829-1830,
- Architect: Joel Whitney
- Architectural style: Federal
- NRHP reference No.: 76000139
- Added to NRHP: September 03, 1976

St. John's Episcopal Church is a historic Episcopal church located on the village green in the village of Highgate Falls in Highgate, Vermont, in the United States. Built 1829–30, it is prominent local example of a Federal style church with Gothic Revival features. On September 3, 1976, it was listed on the National Register of Historic Places.

== Architecture and history ==
St. John's Episcopal Church stands on the east side of the village green in Highgate Falls, near the southern end of the elongated green. It is a single-story brick building, with a gabled roof. The front facade is three bays wide, with Gothic-arched windows flanking a central projecting gabled entry. The double-door entrance is topped by a fanlight, and there is a Palladian window with an arched center above. In the gable of the projection is a Federal style louvered fan. A square tower rises, set astride the boundary between the main roof and the projection. It has a round panel in the first stage, and the second stage is an octagonal louvered belfry.

The church was built between 1829 and 1830 by Joel Whitney of Enosburg, and was consecrated on May 21, 1834, by the Rt. Rev. John Henry Hopkins, the first bishop of the Episcopal Diocese of Vermont. Its design is similar to a plan found in Asher Benjamin's The Country Builder's Assistant, a design book of Federal architecture, but it has been modified with Gothic features. The congregation was a full parish until 1896. Since then it has been under the jurisdiction of Holy Trinity Episcopal Church, Swanton, whose current rector is the Rev. John R. Spainhour.

== See also ==
- National Register of Historic Places listings in Franklin County, Vermont
- St. John's Episcopal Church (disambiguation)
