= St. John's Church, Suzhou =

- 苏州圣约翰堂
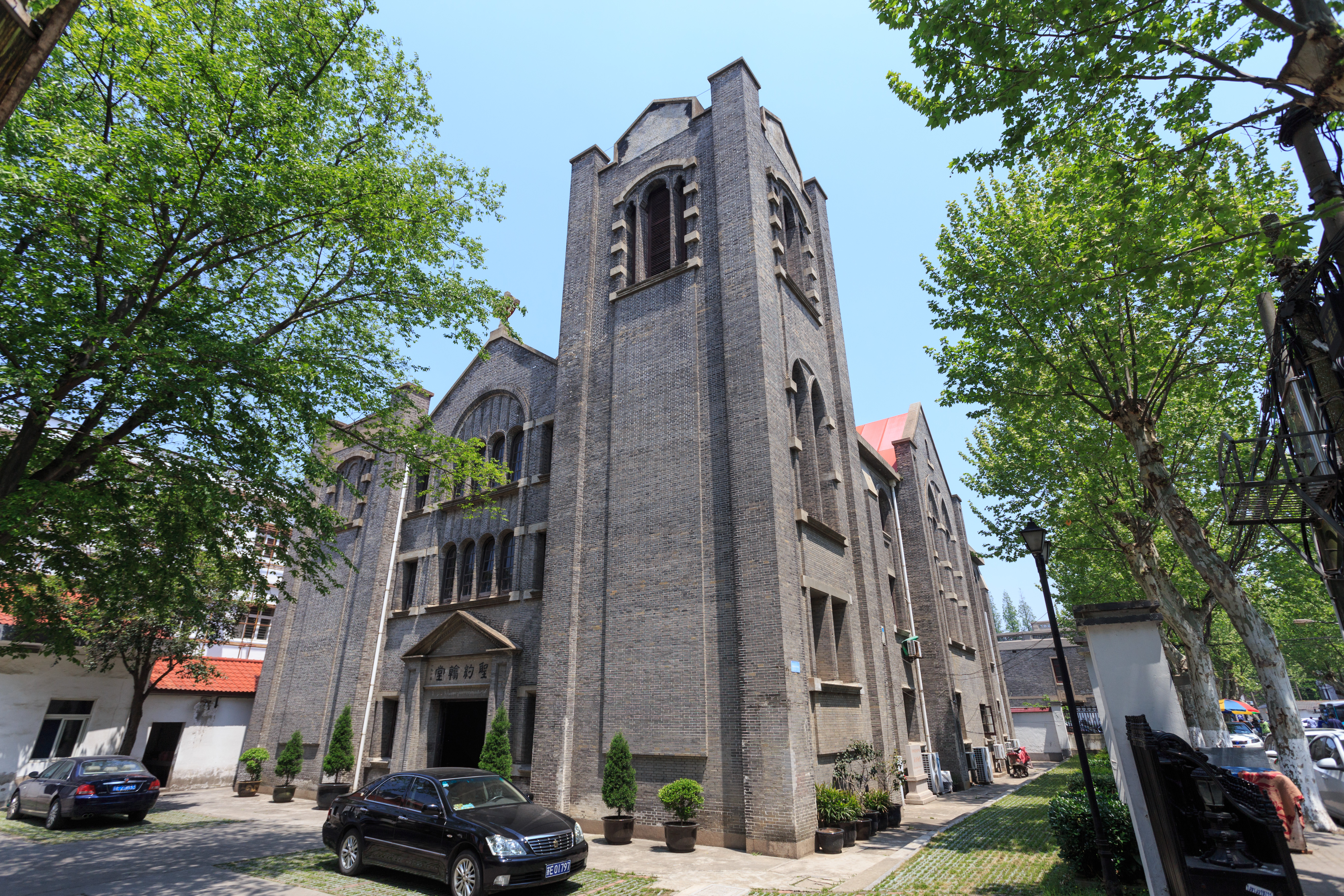
- St. John's Church, Suzhou in 2015

- Location in Jiangsu
- 31°18′19″N 120°38′04″E
- Location: Gusu District, Suzhou, Jiangsu, China
- Denomination: Protestantism

History
- Status: Parish church
- Founded: 1881
- Founder: Alvin Pierson Parker

Architecture
- Functional status: Active
- Architect: John M. Moore
- Architectural type: Church building
- Completed: 1915 (reconstruction)

Specifications
- Materials: Granite

Chinese name
- Simplified Chinese: 蘇州圣约翰堂
- Traditional Chinese: 蘇州聖約翰堂
Transcriptions
Standard Mandarin
- Hanyu Pinyin: Sūzhōu Yuēhàn Táng

St. John's Church, Suzhou (Chinese: 苏州圣约翰堂) is a Protestant church located in Gusu District, Suzhou, Jiangsu, China.

== History ==
St. John's Church traces its origins to the former East Soochow Methodist Church, founded in 1881 by American missionary Alvin Pierson Parker, a member of the Methodist Episcopal Church, South.

At the beginning of the 20th century, the number of Christians in Suzhou increased. In 1915, the Methodist Episcopal Church, South demolished the church and built a new western style church with a construction area of 1,855 square metres (19,970 sq ft) and 800 seats, designing by John M. Moore. And it was renamed the St. John's Church in memory of the St. John's Church in St. Louis, Missouri, United States for its financial support. Chong-tan Lee, grandfather of Tsung-Dao Lee, served as its first chief pastor.

In 1959, the church was rented by the Suzhou First People's Hospital and returned to the Church in 1995. It was refurbished and redecorated from October 1996 to March 1998. The church was officially reopened to the public in November 2005 with the approval of the Chinese government.

== Gallery ==
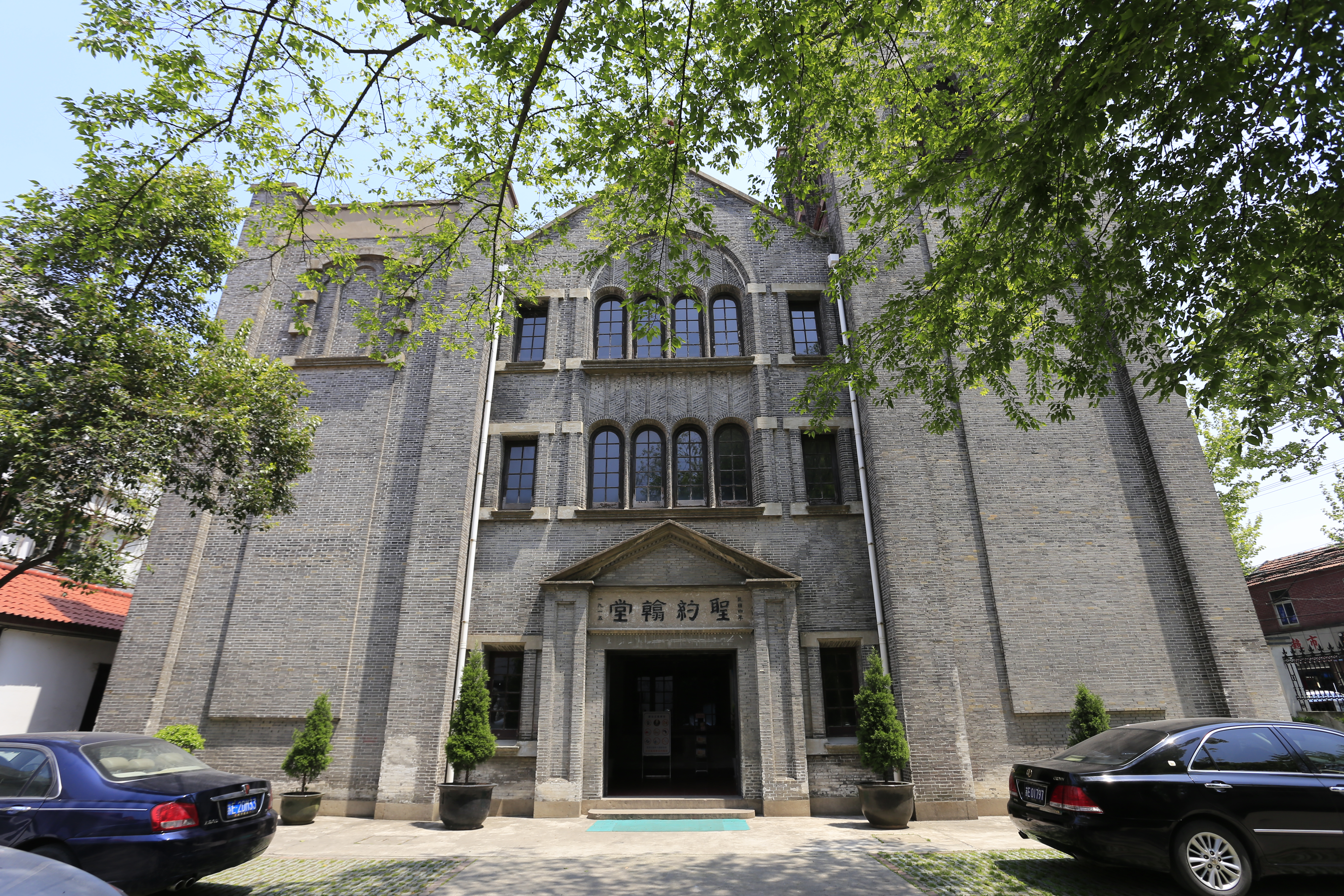
St. John's Church, Suzhou in 2015

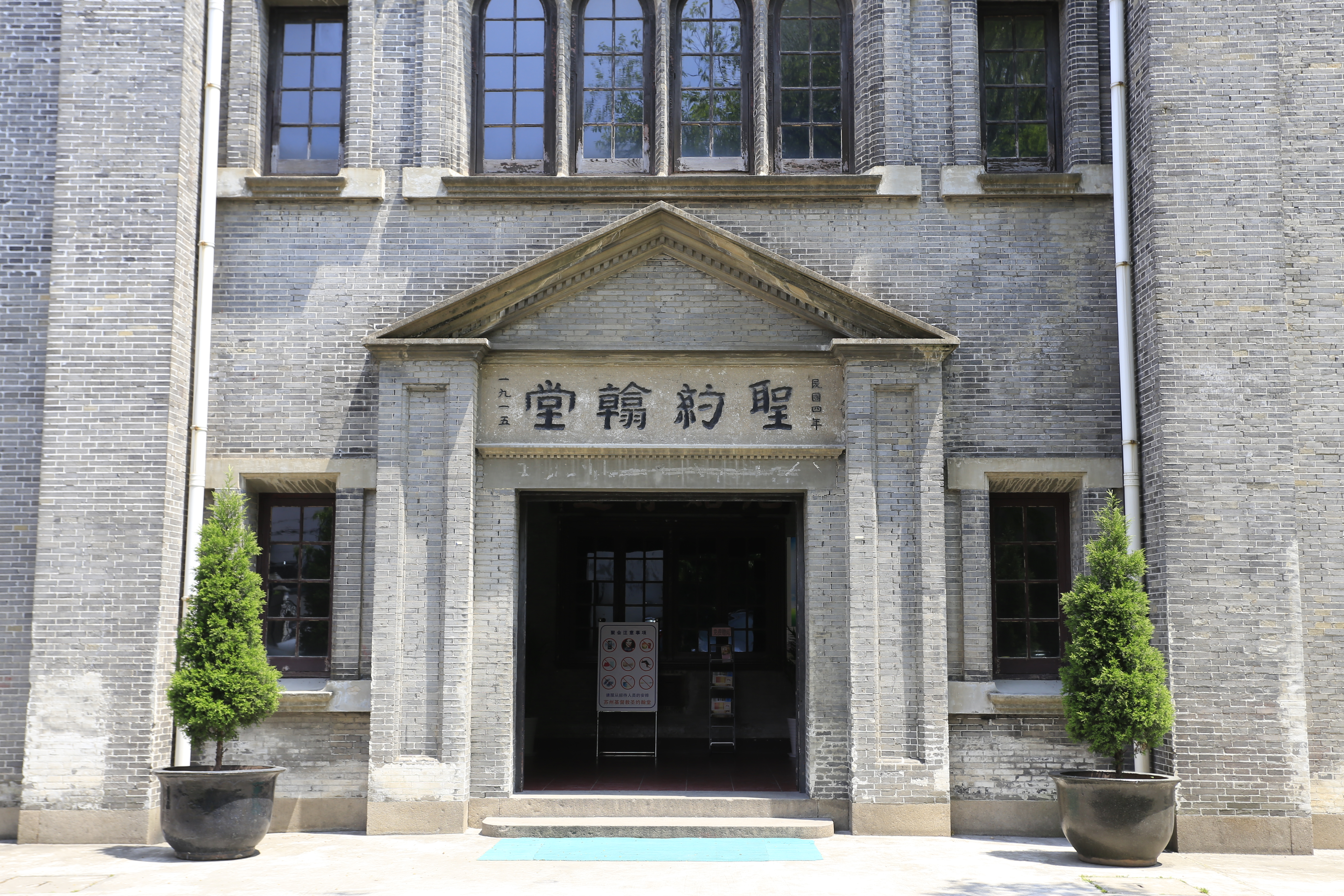
St. John's Church, Suzhou in 2015

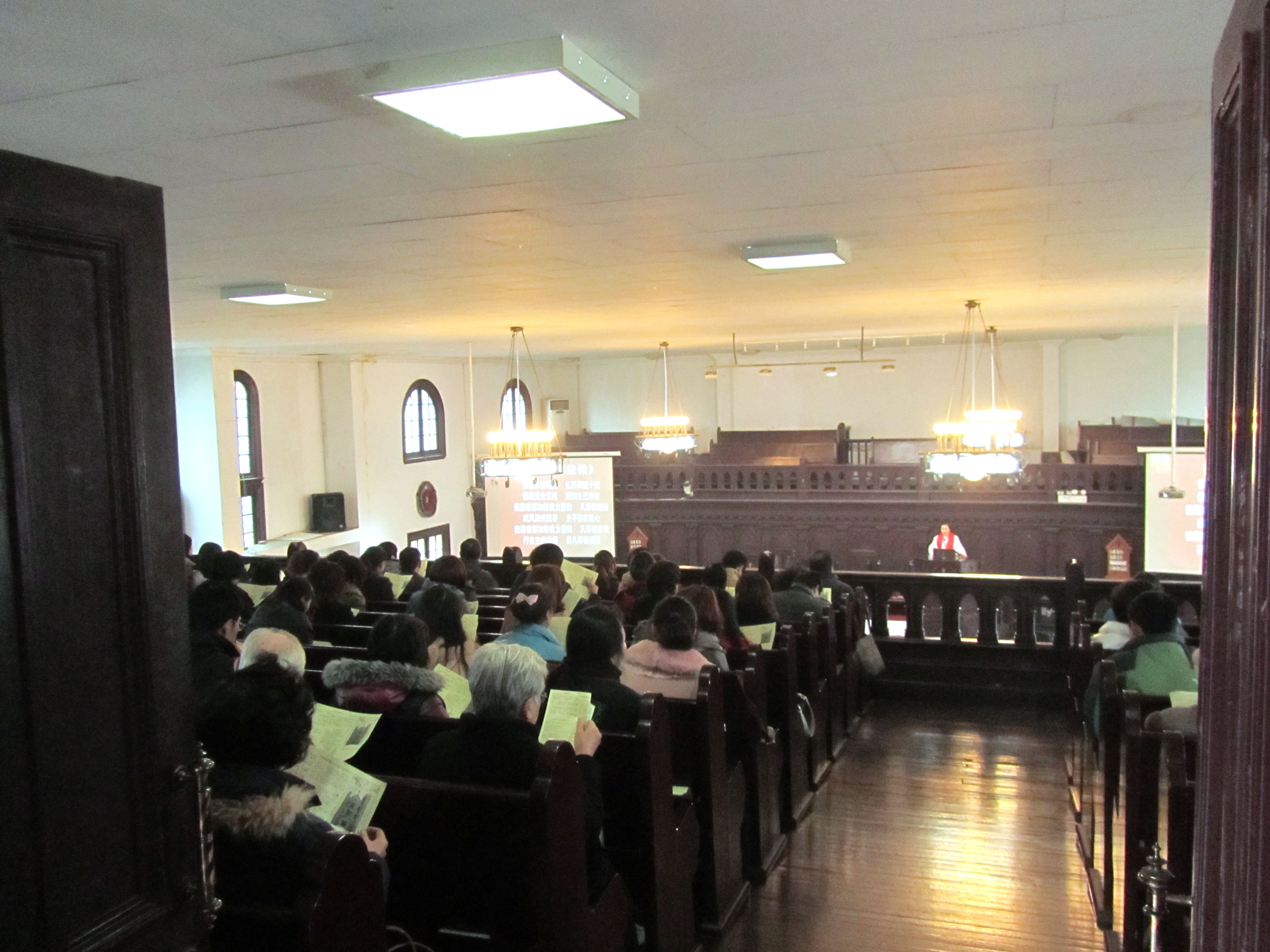
Interior of the St. John's Church
