= St. John's Episcopal Church (Clifton Springs, New York) =

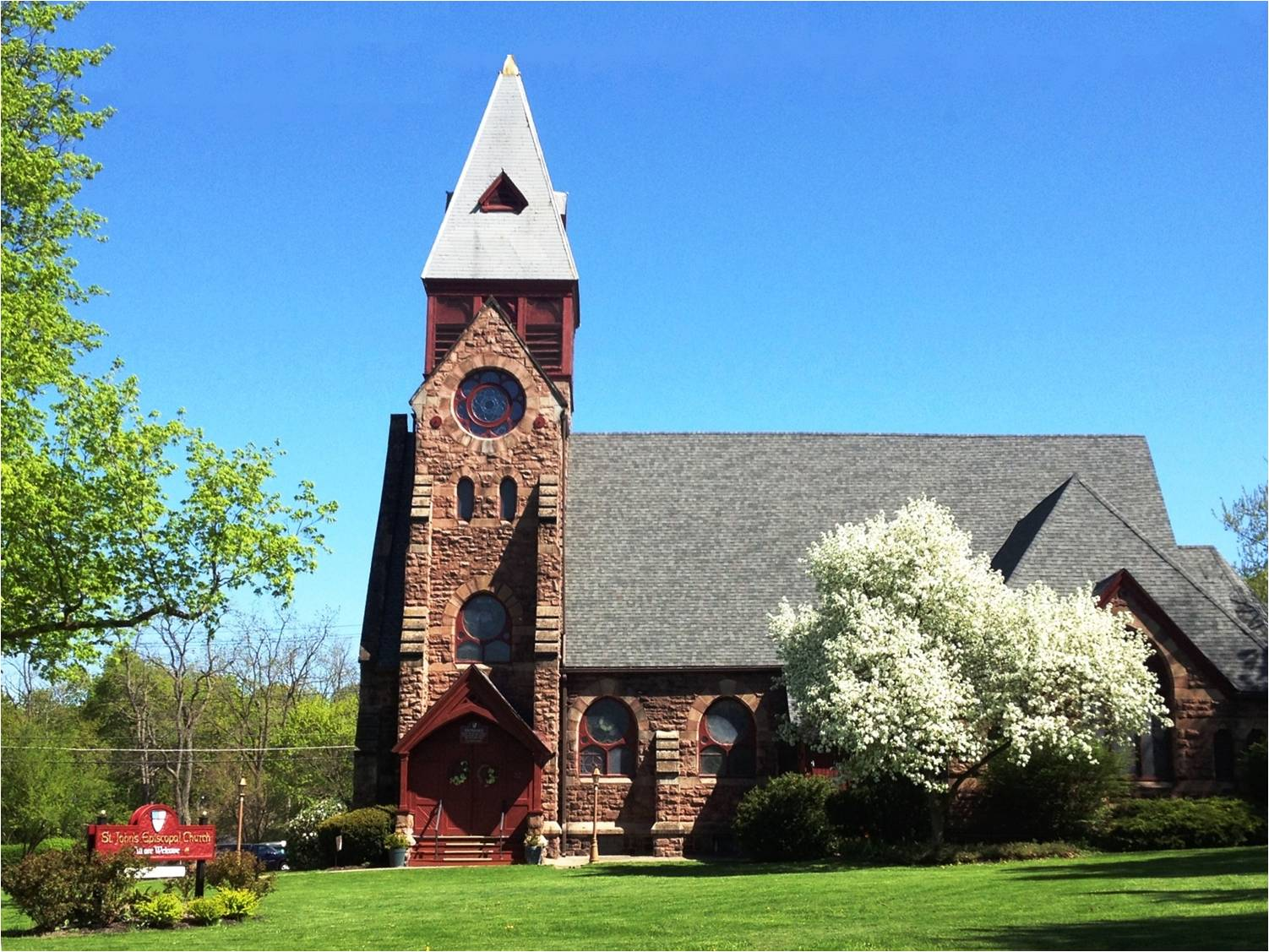

Religion
- Affiliation: Episcopal Church
- District: Diocese of Rochester
- Province: II

Location
- Location: 32 E. Main St., Clifton Springs, New York
- Interactive map of St. John's Episcopal Church
- Coordinates: 42°57′41″N 77°08′00″W

Architecture
- Groundbreaking: 1879
- Completed: 1883

St. John's Episcopal Church, in Clifton Springs, New York, is an Episcopal church founded in 1807. The parish is a member of the Episcopal Diocese of Rochester.

== History ==
The official founding date is 1807, when a piece of land was given to the Episcopal community in Clifton Springs by Mr. John Shekel. A small, wooden structure was built in 1808, which became the First Episcopal Church of Clifton Springs. The building served as the worship home for the Episcopal community until around 1820, when, due to dwindling numbers, the congregation sold the building to the local Methodist community.

The Episcopal community gathered to worship in one another's homes until 1841, when the group grew too large, and a new building project was begun. The Second Episcopal Church of Clifton Springs was only in use for around 40 years, though, because in 1967, the current rector suggested a new edifice be built.

In 1879, the cornerstone was laid for the current St. John's structure. The building, made of Medina sandstone (from Medina, New York), was completed in 1883 and consecrated in 1884. In 2018, St. John's was inducted into the Medina Sandstone Hall of Fame, which judges structures "based on their age, longevity, beauty and architectural uniqueness."

In 1967, St. John’s in Clifton Springs, St. John's in Phelps, and Trinity Mission in Shortsville were merged into one parish – St. John’s in Clifton Springs. Today, the church serves the villages of Clifton Springs, Phelps, Shortsville, and Manchester.

== List of clergy ==
- Davenport Phelps, 1807-1813
- William A. Clark, 1811-1818
- Orin Clark, 1811-1816
- Alanson W. Welton, 1814-1821
- Henry Onderdonk, 1817-1820
- George Norton, 1818-1838
- Virgil H. Barber, 1818
- Erastus Spaulding, 1833-1854
- Kendrick Metcalf, 1855-1864
- William Gorham, 1858
- George Gillespie, 1860-1861
- Francis Russell, 1864-1866
- William Edson, 1866-1883
- George Le Boutillier, 1883-1886
- Lewis Clover, 1887-1890
- John Kinney, 1891-1893
- John Banchet, 1894-1897
- James Foster, 1898
- Alexander McDuff, 1898
- Frank Baum, 1989-1905
- Louis Johnston, 1906-1908
- Maskell Freeman, 1909-1916
- W. Guy Raines, 1918-1923
- Charles Purdy, 1924-1927
- Irving McGrew, 1927-1936
- Kenneth Frank Arnold, 1936-1938
- H. John Van Duyne, 1959-1963
- John J. Reinheimer, 1964-1971
- James C. Wood, 1971-1972
- Dustin P. Ordway, 1974-1977
- Jasper Pennington, 1978-1980
- Frank Howden, 1981-1993
- Cristine V. Rockwell, 1994-1998
- Thomas S. Gramley, 1999-2006
- Denise Bennett, 2007-2014
- Andrew VanBuren, 2015–2019
- Donald Schranz, 2020–present
