= Saint John's Church, Sibiu =

Lutheran church in Sibiu, Romania

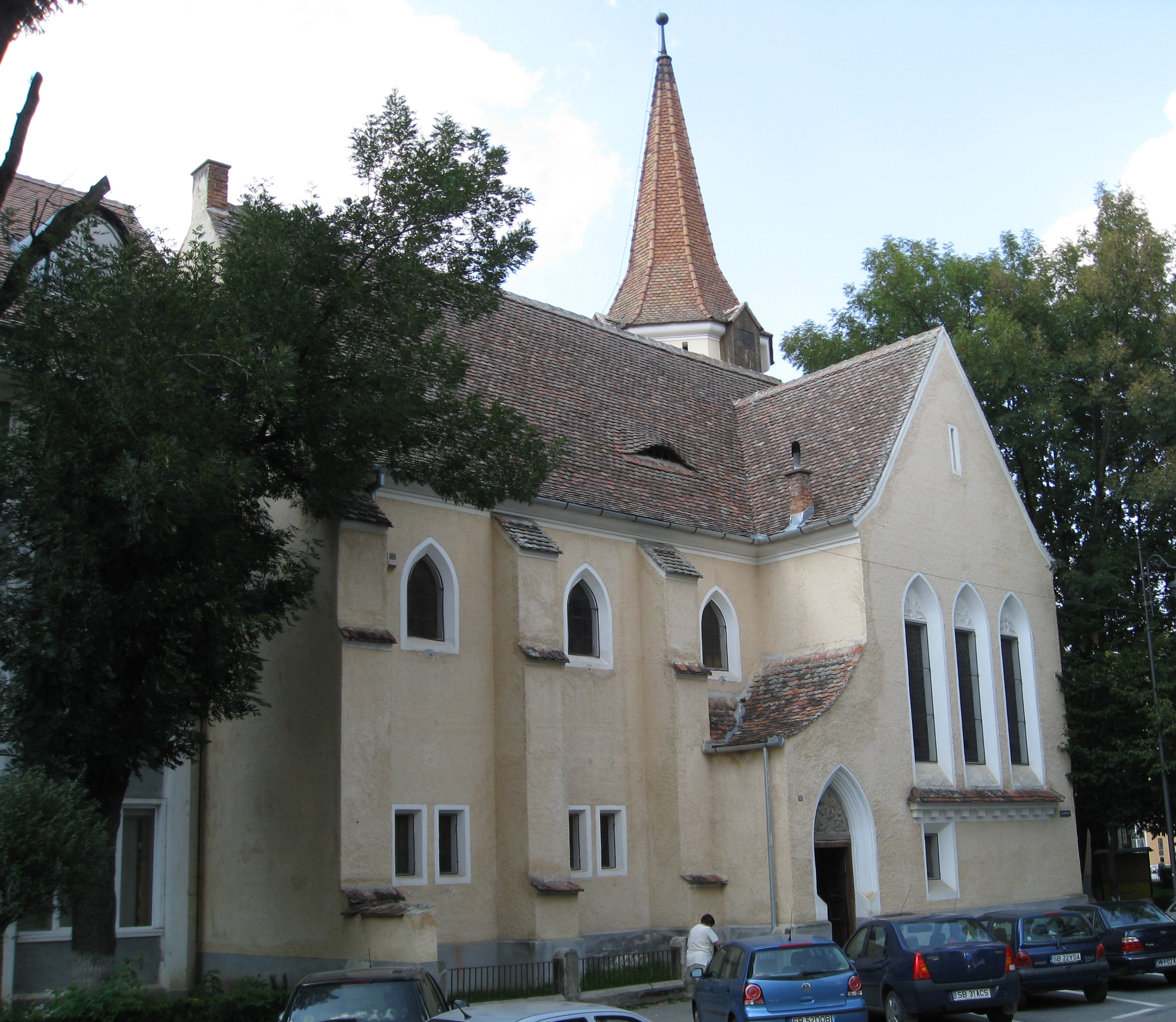
Saint John's Church, Sibiu

Saint John's Church (Romanian: Biserica Sf. Johannis; German: Johanniskirche) is a Lutheran (Evangelical Church of Augustan Confession in Romania) church located at 30 Mitropoliei Street, Sibiu, Romania. A complex of buildings was raised on the site in 1881-1883 as an orphanage serving the city's Lutherans, with the Neo-Gothic church completed in 1883, the 400th anniversary of the birth of Martin Luther. As there was a danger of collapse, this was demolished between 1911 and 1912, and a new church and priest's residence were built. The church is cross-shaped, with an octagonal steeple to the north and four corner towers. The building is largely unchanged from the early 20th century.
