= St. John's Lutheran Church (Parkville, Maryland) =

Christian congregation in Maryland, US

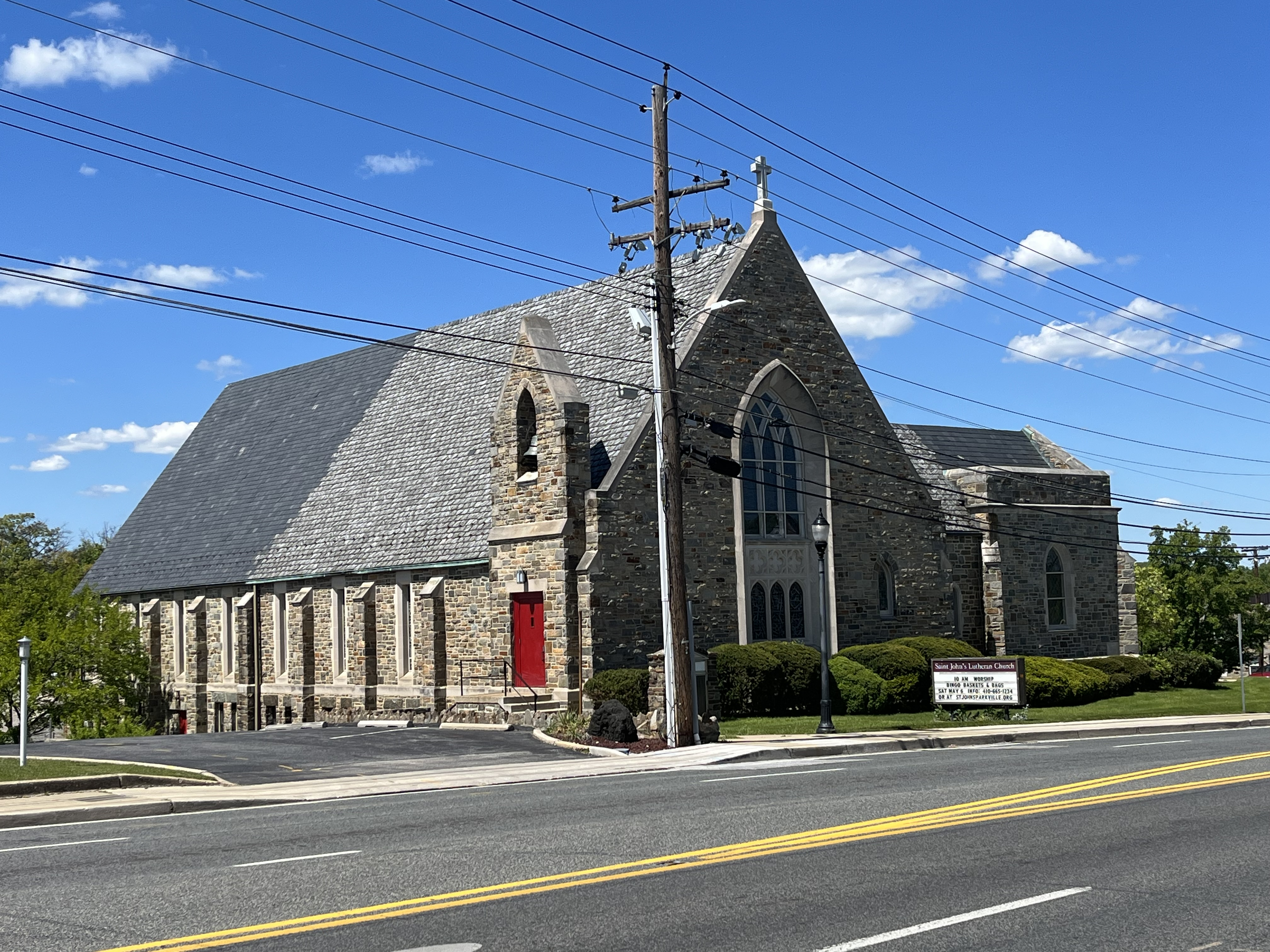
- Southern façade of St. John's main building and sanctuary, facing Harford Road
- St. John's Lutheran Church
- 39°23′3″N 76°32′3″W
- Location: Parkville, Maryland
- Country: United States
- Denomination: Evangelical Lutheran Church in America
- Tradition: Lutheran
- Website: www.stjohnsparkville.org]

History
- Status: Church

Architecture
- Functional status: Active

St. John's Lutheran Church is a large Evangelical Lutheran Church in America congregation in Parkville, Maryland, United States.

== Location ==
Parkville straddles the Baltimore City/Baltimore County line. St. John's is located in central Parkville. Parkville's population grew rapidly after World War II and the opening of the Baltimore Beltway, Interstate 695, in 1962. The population of Parkville has settled at about 35,000 people.

== Congregation ==
About 50% of the members of the congregation are over 65 years old and moved to Parkville from Baltimore City after World War II. The other 50% of St. John's members have settled recently in the community.

== Ministry ==
St. John's Lutheran Church has Bible studies, women's ministries, social and fellowship ministries for elders, a singles ministry, and young families ministry. Sunday classes are held for students in grades two through twelve. St. John's Lutheran Church supports helping and social ministries of all kinds, including support for homeless shelters, shelters for abused women with families, resettling refugee families, and relating to the Lutheran Churches in the third world.
