= Saint John's Church, Habo =

Coordinates: 57.9061°N 14.0809°E

Saint John's Church
- Sankt Johannes kyrka
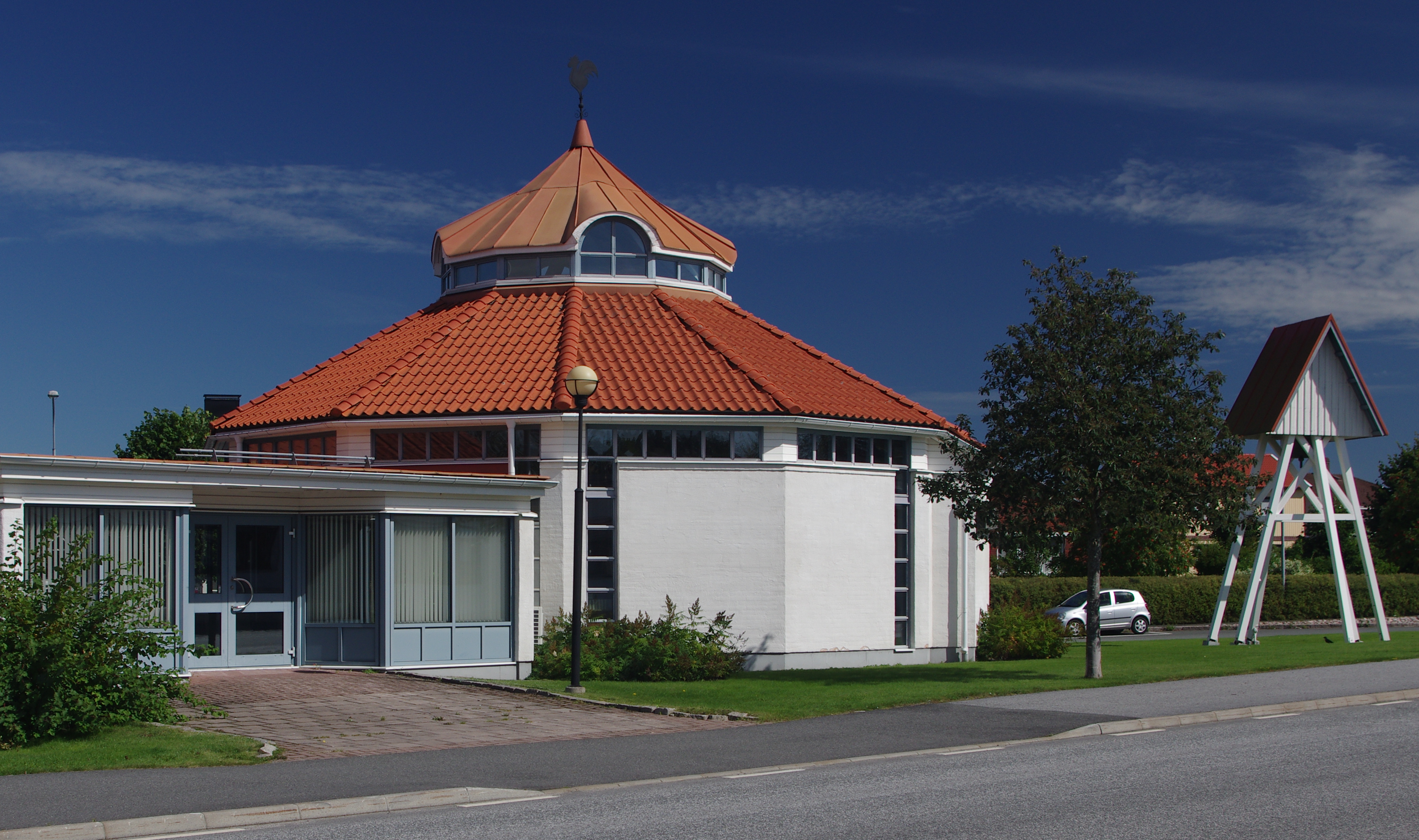
- Saint John's Church in August 2011
- Saint John's Church
- Location: Habo
- Country: Sweden
- Denomination: Church of Sweden

History
- Consecrated: 12 September 1993

Administration
- Diocese: Skara
- Parish: Habo

Saint John's Church (Swedish: Sankt Johannes kyrka) is a church building in Habo in Sweden. Belonging to the Habo Parish of the Church of Sweden, it was inaugurated on 12 September 1993.
