= St. John's Episcopal Church (Phelps, New York) =

Historic church in New York, United States

- U.S. National Register of Historic Places
- Location within New York Location within the United States
- Location: Church St., Phelps, New York
- Coordinates: 42°57′23″N 77°3′28″W
- Area: 0.2 acres (0.081 ha)
- Built: 1849
- Architect: Douglass, Maj. David B.
- Architectural style: Gothic Revival, "English parish" Gothic
- NRHP reference No.: 78001892
- Added to NRHP: November 07, 1978

St. John's Episcopal Church is a historic Episcopal church located at Phelps in Ontario County, New York. It was built in 1849, the chancel was extended in 1897, and the tower added in 1905. The meeting room and office addition was completed in 1954. It is architecturally significant as a Gothic Revival-style church that reflects the "English parish" movement traceable to the Church of St. James the Less in Philadelphia.

It was listed on the National Register of Historic Places in 1978.

The congregation of St. John's merged with St. John's Episcopal Church, Clifton Springs in 1967. Currently, the historic building houses the Phelps Arts Center.
