= Church of St John the Divine, Morecambe =

Coordinates: 54.0580°N 2.8876°W

St John the Divine Church, Morecambe
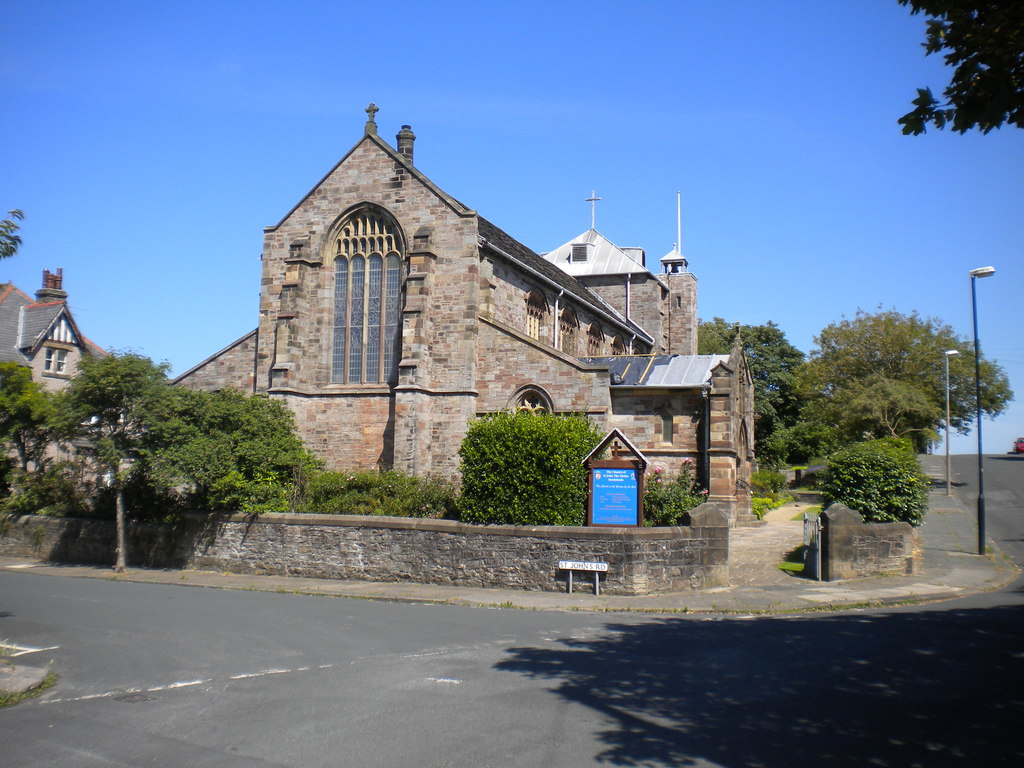
- View from the southwest

- Location in Morecambe
- OS grid reference: SD 420 628
- Location: Draycombe Drive, Sandylands, Morecambe, Lancashire
- Country: England
- Denomination: Anglican
- Website: Facebook

History
- Status: Parish church

Architecture
- Functional status: Active
- Heritage designation: Grade II
- Designated: 20 January 1993
- Architect: Austin and Paley
- Architectural type: Church
- Style: Gothic Revival
- Groundbreaking: 1898
- Completed: 1901

Specifications
- Materials: Sandstone

Administration
- Province: York
- Diocese: Blackburn
- Archdeaconry: Lancaster
- Deanery: Lancaster and Morecambe
- Parish: St John Sandylands

St John the Divine Church is in Draycombe Drive, Sandylands, Morecambe, Lancashire, England. It is an active Anglican parish church in the deanery of Lancaster and Morecambe, the archdeaconry of Lancaster, and the diocese of Blackburn. The church is recorded in the National Heritage List for England as a designated Grade II listed building.

== History ==
Dedicated to St John of Patmos, the traditional author of the Book of Revelation, the church was built between 1898 and 1901 to a design by the Lancaster architects Austin and Paley. It cost about £7,000 (equivalent to £740,000 in 2025), and provided seating for 600 people.

== Architecture ==
=== Exterior ===
St John's is constructed in sandstone rubble with ashlar dressings. The roofs are also in sandstone, other than the tower and the porch that are roofed in aluminium. Its plan consists of a nave with a clerestory, north and south aisles, a south porch, a tower at the crossing with a north vestry and a south transept, and a chancel. The nave is in five bays with an extra shorter bay at the west end. The windows contain Perpendicular tracery, other than the chancel, which has a pair of windows with Decorated tracery. The west window has four lights, and is flanked by buttresses. Each of the clerestory windows has four lights under segmental heads; the aisle windows have two or three lights under flat heads. Above the doorway of the porch is a niche in a gable surmounted by a cross finial. In the transept is a two-light south window with panels above and below containing blind tracery. The chancel has two two-light south windows. The tower and the associated stair turret were not finished; the turret contains a bellcote.

=== Interior ===
The arcades are in five bays and are carried on octagonal piers. Between the nave and the crossing is a low alabaster wall that incorporates the pulpit. The chancel roof is carried on corbels carved with gilded angels. The font has a cover carved in the shape of a building with a spire. The windows contain stained glass dating between 1920 and 1994. The large west window by the stained-glass artist Hugh Easton features the Four Horsemen of the Apocalypse from the Book of Revelation. The two-manual organ was built in about 1901 by Albert Keates, and was rebuilt in about 1930 by Rushworth and Dreaper.

== See also ==
- List of ecclesiastical works by Austin and Paley (1895–1914)
