= St. John's Episcopal Church (Georgetown) =

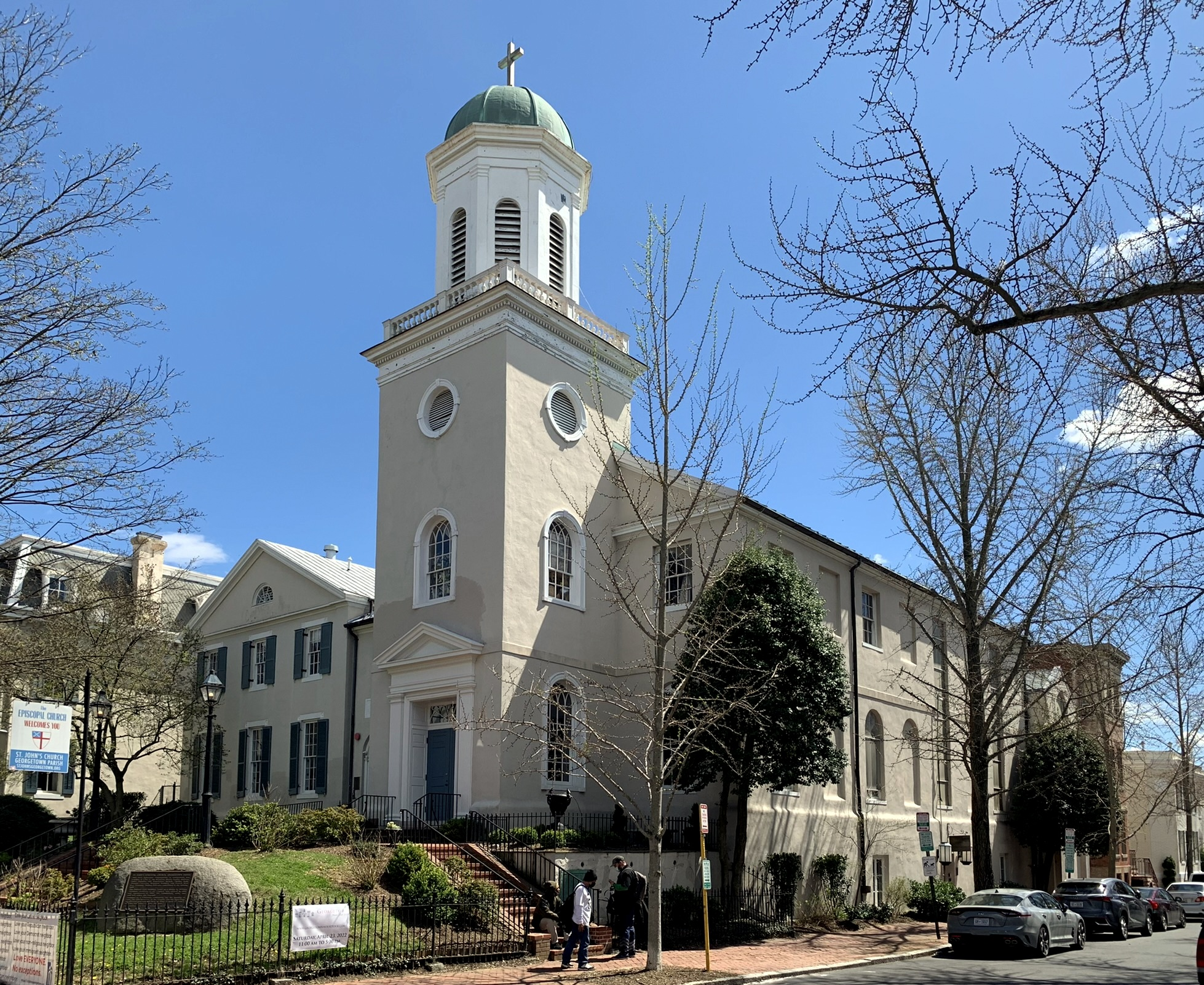
- St. John's Episcopal Church, Georgetown, in 2022
- St. John's Episcopal Church
- 38°54′27″N 77°03′54″W
- Location: 3240 O St. NW, Washington, D.C. 20007
- Denomination: Episcopal Church
- Website: stjohnsgeorgetown.org

History
- Founded: 1796
- Founder: Walter Dulany Addison
- Consecrated: 1809

Architecture
- Architect: William Thornton
- Style: Federal
- Completed: 1804

Administration
- Diocese: Episcopal Diocese of Washington

Clergy
- Rector: Virginia Gerbasi

St. John's Episcopal Church is a parish of the Episcopal Church located in the Georgetown neighborhood of Washington, D.C., United States. Original plans for the church date to 1769, and the parish church was officially founded by Walter Dulany Addison in 1796. The church building was designed by architect William Thornton in the Federal style and was structurally completed in 1804, to be consecrated in 1809.

== History ==
In 1769, the Church of England acquired land in Georgetown, on which construction of the first Episcopal church in Georgetown began in 1796. The exterior of the two-story building, measuring 42 feet (13 m) by 51 feet (16 m), was completed in 1804, while its interior continued to be outfitted until 1809, when the church was consecrated. The building was designed by William Thornton, the architect of the Capitol, in the Federal style. Its founder and first pastor was Rev. Walter Dulany Addison, who later became Chaplain of the United States Senate. Numerous prominent men made financial contributions for the erection of the church, including Thomas Corcoran, Benjamin Stoddert, Francis Scott Key (who later wrote "The Star Spangled Banner, America's national anthem), and future president of the United States Thomas Jefferson.

In 1817, St. John's Episcopal Church, Lafayette Square was founded as an outgrowth of St. John's, Georgetown. The church began suffering financial problems which led to its disestablishment in 1831. The building was sold to Ferdinand Pettrich, who used it as a sculpting studio. Several women who were former parishioners of the church raised $50, which allowed them to purchase the church back in 1838. The church underwent several expansions and interior improvements in the subsequent years. Throughout the mid-19th century, major renovations of the church occurred, including the construction of the adjacent Sunday school in 1865, the complete gutting of the church in 1870, and the construction of the rectory in 1875. During this work, services were held in Georgetown Presbyterian Church. The belfry was redesigned in 1924, and a Chapel of the Carpenter was built in 1951.

Educational programs for children have existed at the church since the mid-19th century. The current St. John's Episcopal Preschool was established in 1997.

== Pipe organ ==
A 33-stop and 39-rank organ with three manuals was installed by Canadian organ-building company Casavant Frères in 2012 as opus 3895. The instrument is in an L-shaped space adjacent to the choir, with sound openings facing both the choir and the nave. The Great and the main pedal are located between the two sound openings. The Swell division is installed behind the Great, and the main pedal to project directly through the choir into the chancel. The Solo is above the aisle, with expression blades facing both the nave and the choir. The 16' wooden Contrabass and 16' pedal Subbass stops are installed at the other end of the "L" and speak through the acoustically transparent walls of the corridor. The existing Chamade Trumpet located in the gallery has been retained from the previously installed organ but completely revisited in Casavant's workshop.

== Gallery ==
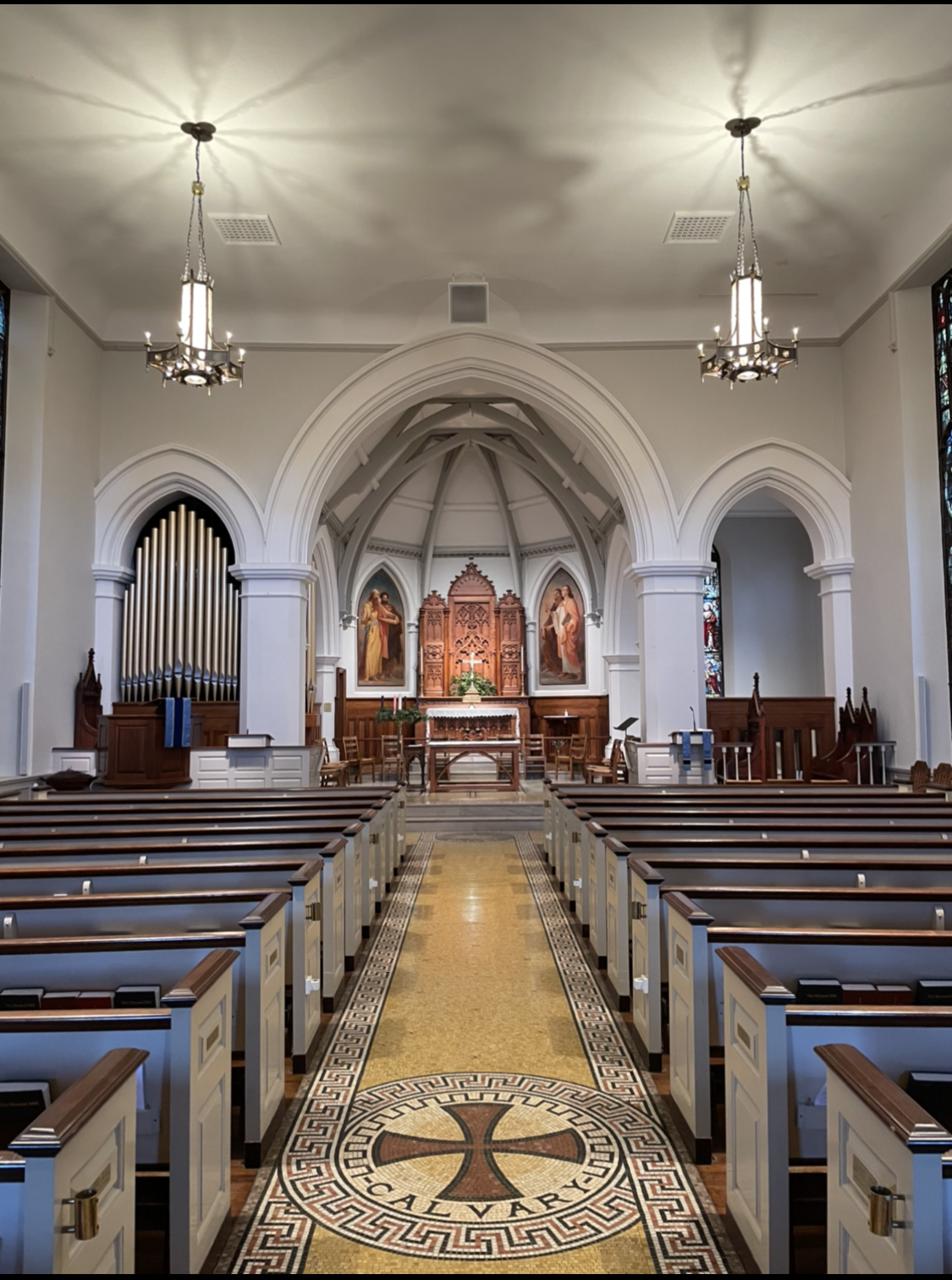
Organ façade towards the chancel

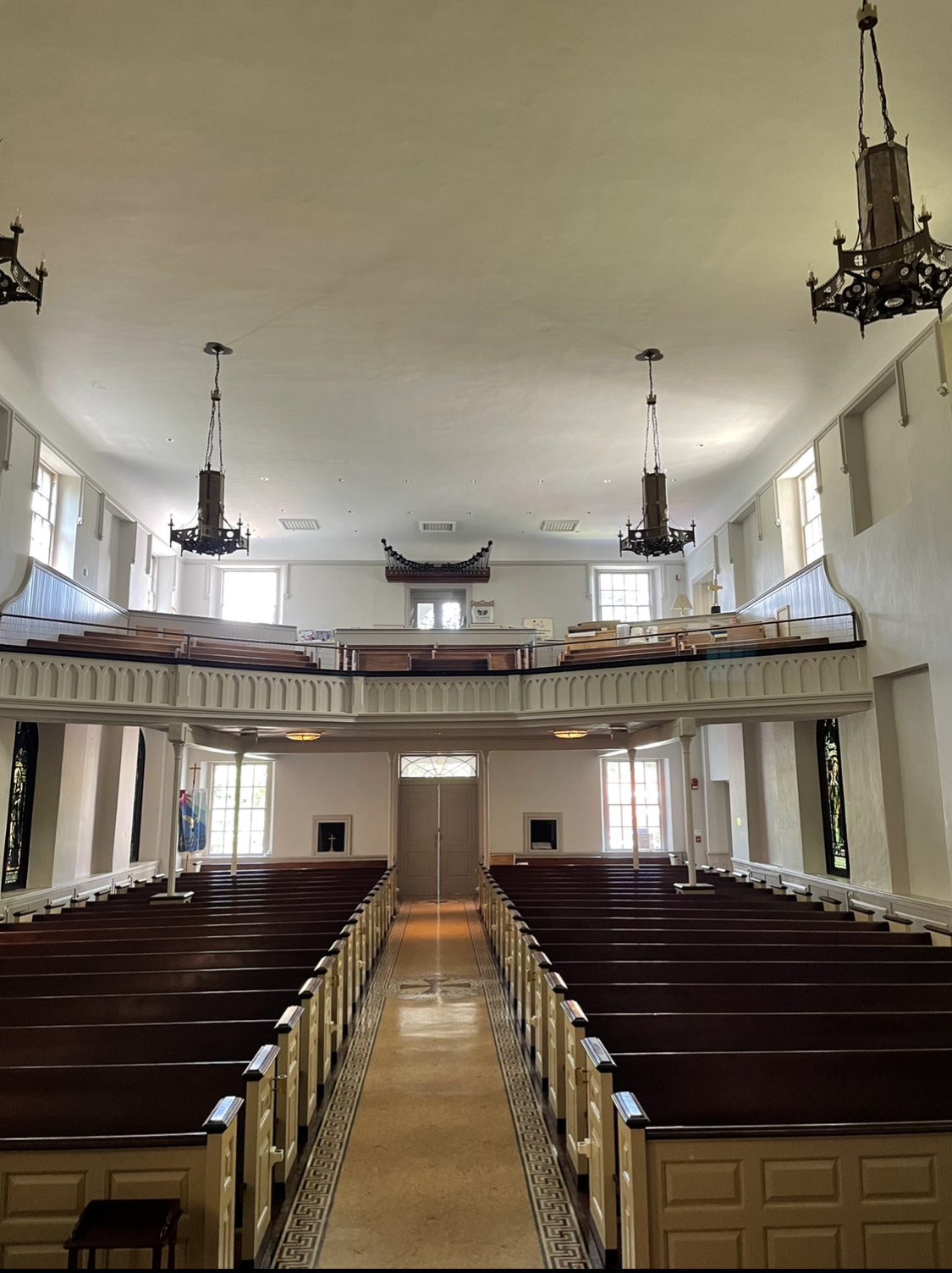
Gallery with the organ's Trompette-en-chamade

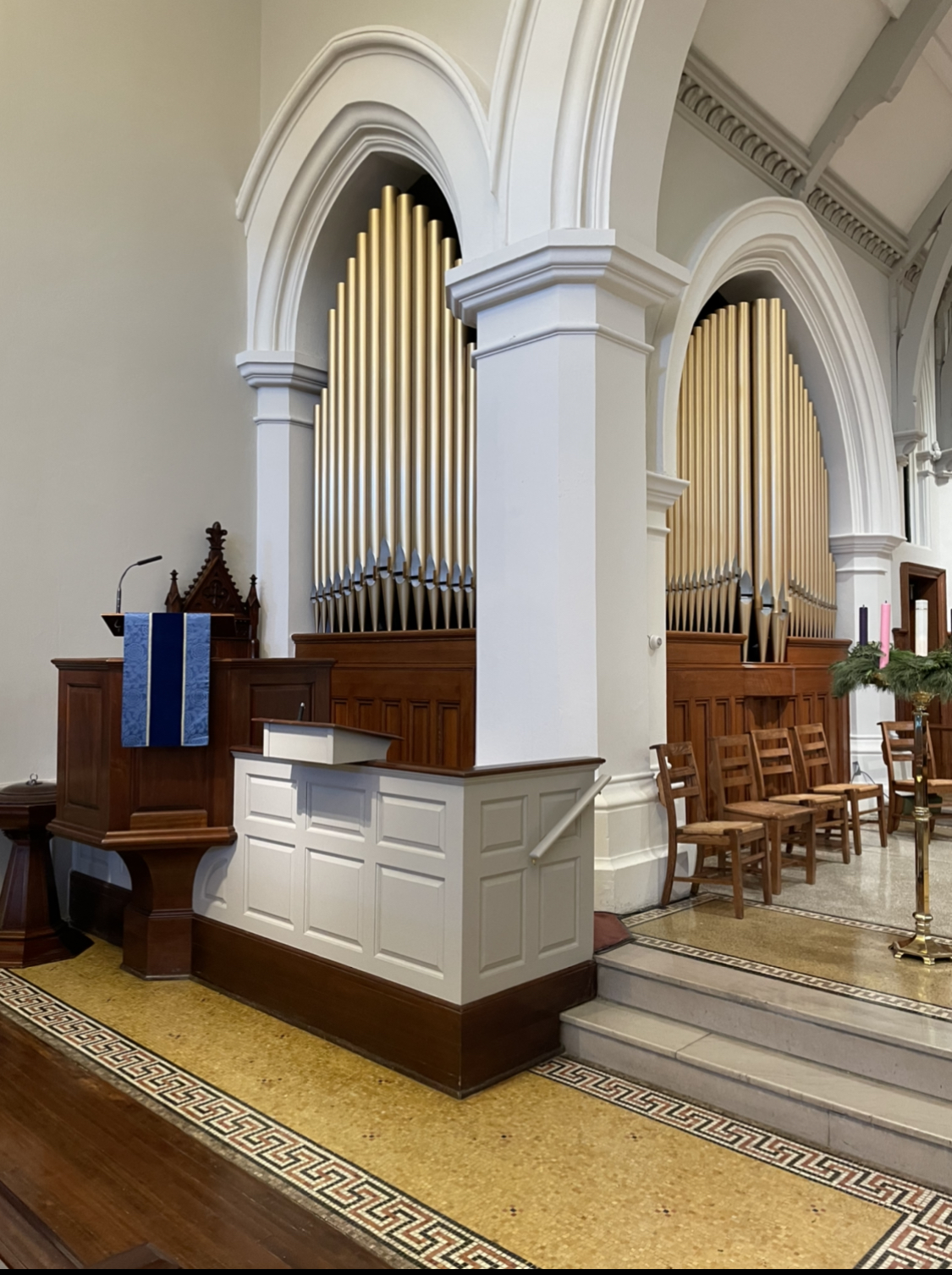
Organ façades towards the nave and the chancel

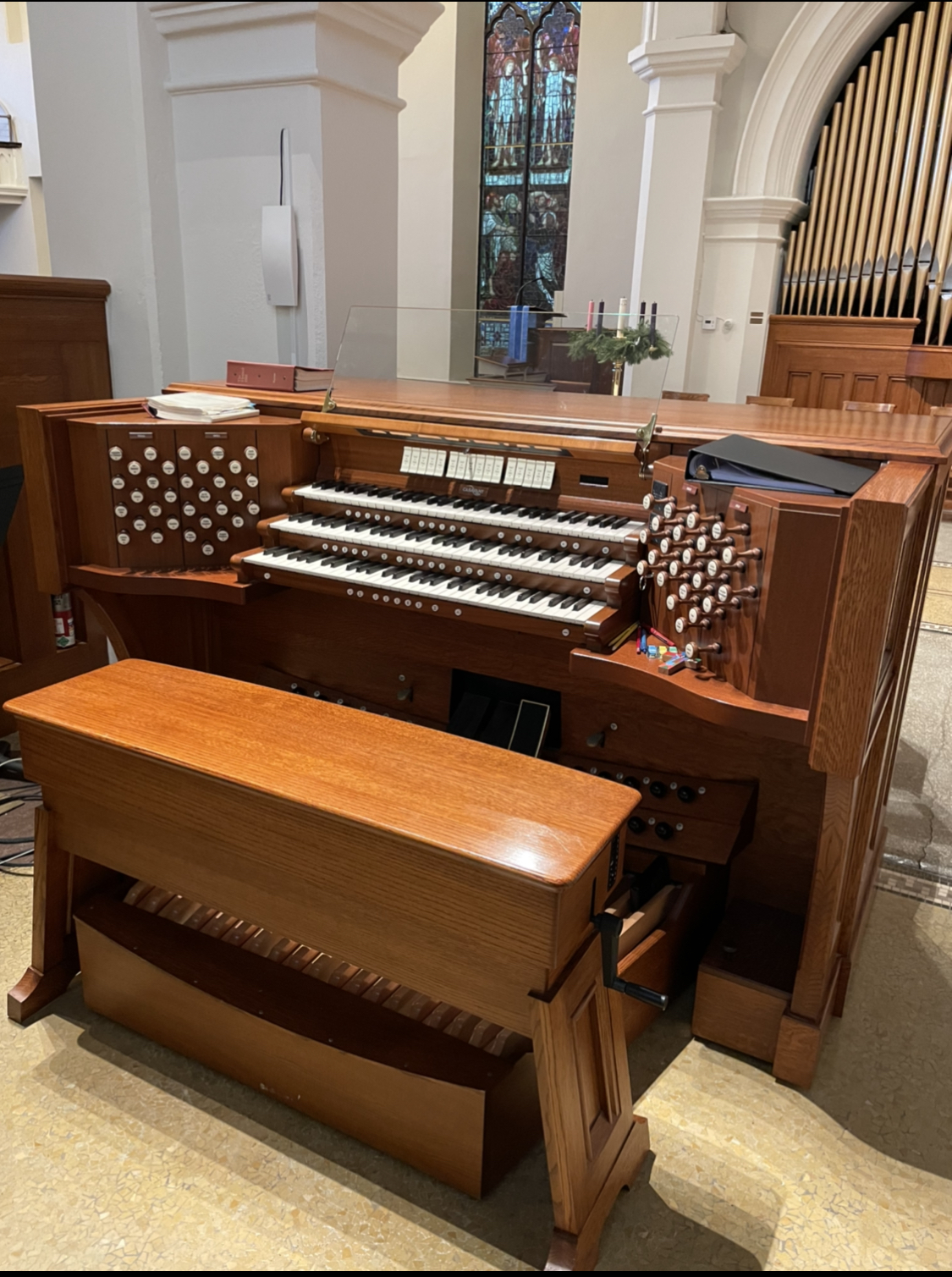
Organ console

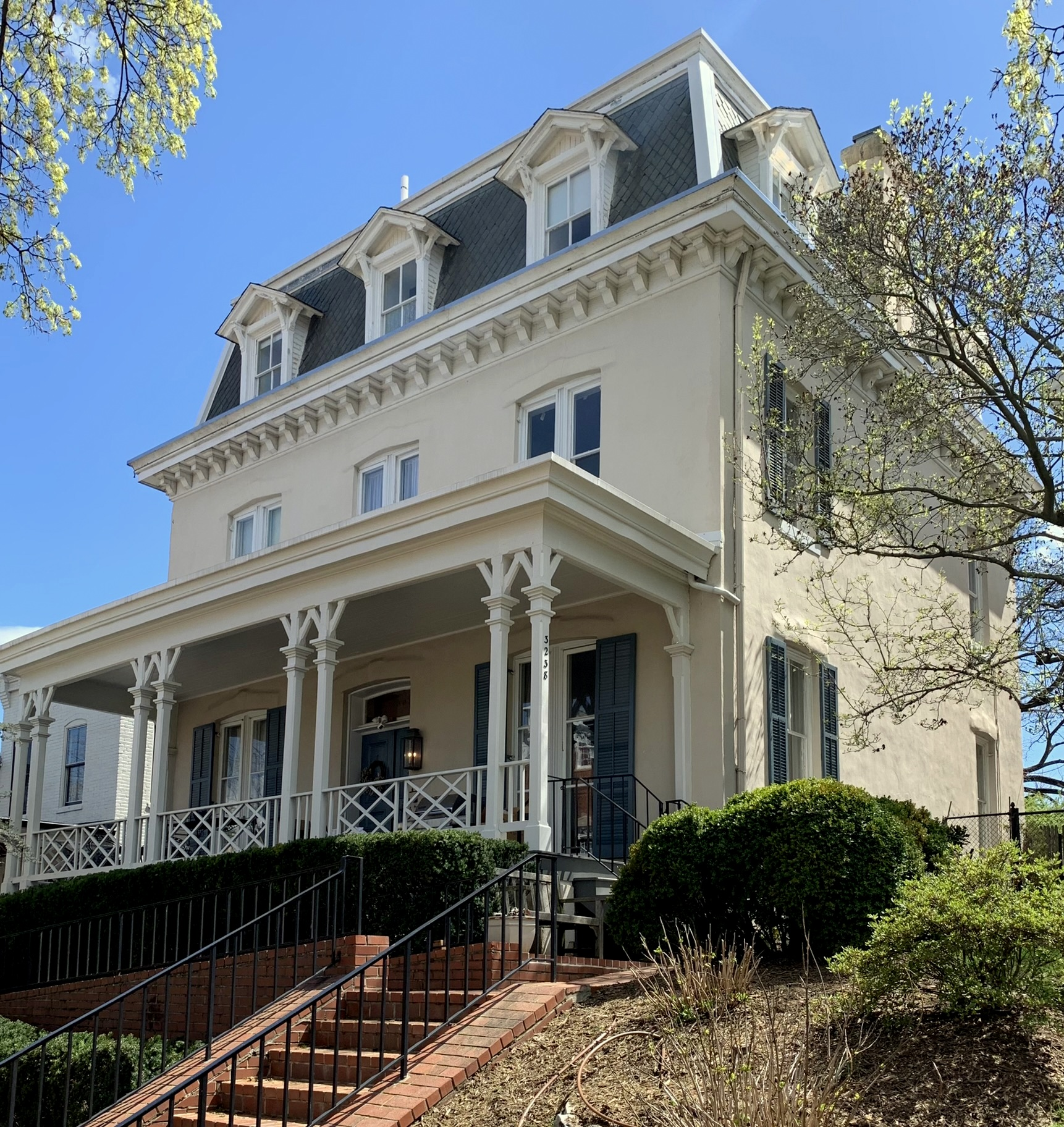
Rectory built in 1875
