= St John's Anglican Church, Wentworth =

St John's Anglican Church
- Church of St John the Evangelist
- St. John's Anglican Church and Rectory
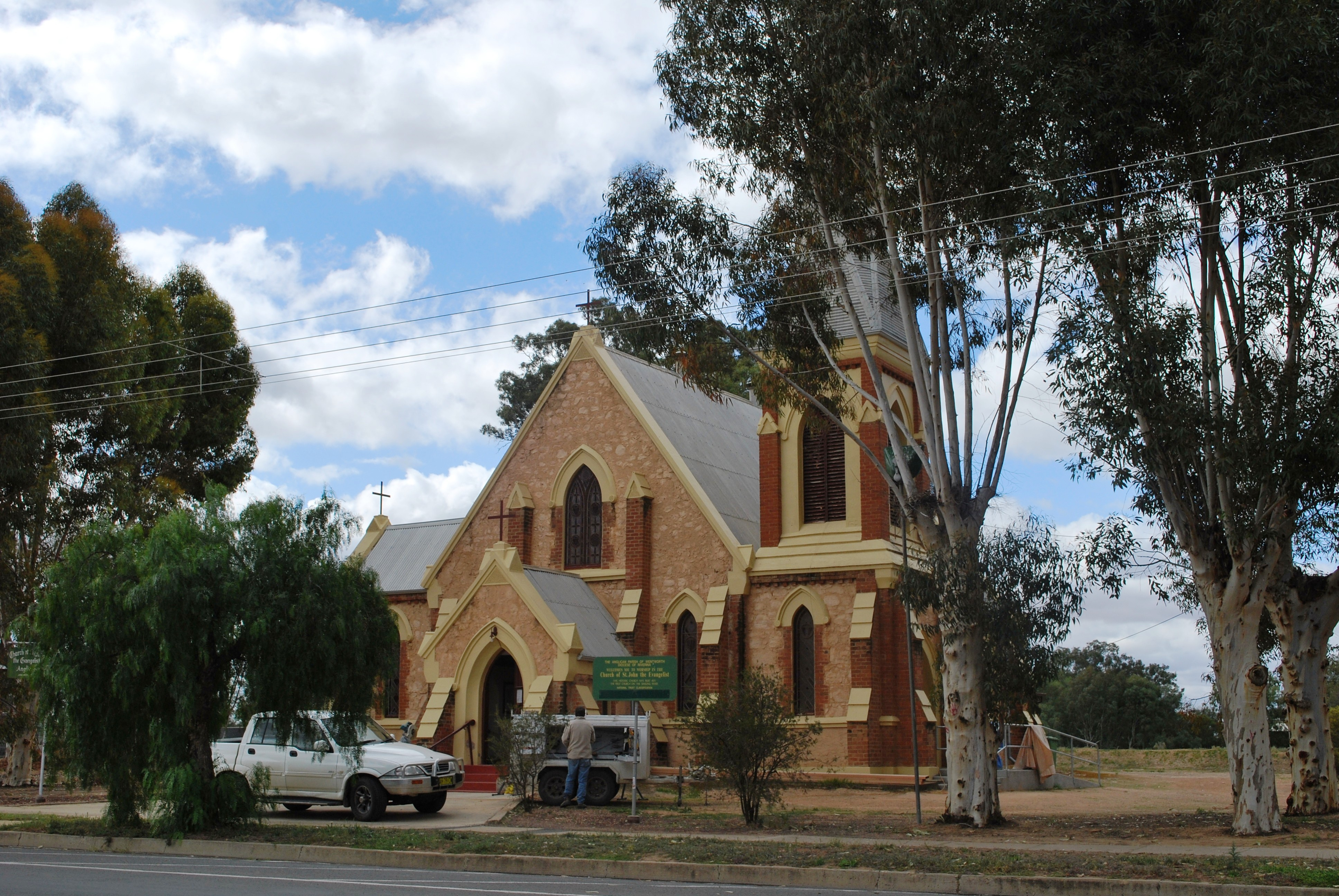
- Church of St John the Evangelist, pictured in 2009

- Location in New South Wales
- 34°06′17″S 141°55′09″E
- Location: Darling Street, Wentworth, Wentworth Shire, New South Wales
- Country: Australia
- Denomination: Anglican
- Website: anglicanriverina.com/parishes/

History
- Status: Church
- Founded: 23 May 1871
- Founder: Reverend William Cocks
- Dedication: Saint John the Evangelist

Architecture
- Functional status: Active
- Architect: Reverend A. D. Soares
- Architectural type: Church
- Years built: 1871
- Completed: 25 December 1871

Specifications
- Materials: Random rubble; Brickwork; Galvanised iron roof and spire; Cedar internal frames and fittings

Administration
- Province: New South Wales
- Diocese: Riverina
- Parish: Wentworth

Clergy
- Rector: Rev. Daniel Dries

New South Wales Heritage Register
- Official name: St. John's Anglican Church and Rectory
- Type: State heritage (complex / group)
- Designated: 2 April 1999
- Reference no.: 661
- Type: Church
- Category: Religion

St John's Anglican Church, officially the Church of St John the Evangelist, is a heritage-listed Anglican church located at Darling Street, Wentworth, Wentworth Shire, New South Wales, Australia. It was designed by Reverend A. D. Soares and built in 1871. It is also known as St. John's Anglican Church and Rectory. The property is owned by the Anglican Parish of Wentworth. The church was added to the New South Wales State Heritage Register on 2 April 1999.

== History ==
A visit by Bishop Mesac Thomas to Wentworth in 1870 resulted in local pressure for the construction of a church. However, it was a time of hardship and economic downturn as the 1870 flood had devastated Wentworth driving out residents and checking trade. Money was elusive when in February 1871 Bishop Thomas sent the Reverend William Cocks to report on what might be done in forming a parish in Wentworth.

Reverend Cocks became the first resident Anglican minister in Wentworth. A building fund was established and over 100 community members subscribed that resulted in the construction of the church. A bazaar and auction was also held that resulted in the raising of A£188. On 23 May 1871 the foundation stone of the new church was laid by His Honour, Judge Francis.

Many people of other denominations were very generous and contributed financially to the construction of the church. In return, the Reverend Cocks, with concurrence of his Bishop made the services of the Church of England available to all denominations which desired his care, because there was no other Church or Minister available. Considering that the township of Wentworth only contained 370 inhabitants and the entire district about 1,200 all told, the construction of the building is of great credit to the local community.

Reverend Cocks acted as overseer and contractor of the building of St John's. The stone was brought to the site by barges. He gave assistance wherever he could be useful and after clerical duties he would mix mortar and he became known as "the Reverent Mixer of Mortar". The bricks were acquired from the Presbyterian Church Committee which had abandoned the intention of building. The building committee of the Roman Catholic Church likewise suffered a setback and as a result, Reverend Cocks acquired their stained glass windows. Mr G. Brooks of Kermode Street, North Adelaide completed the set of twelve windows. They are elaborately constructed of stained glass with appropriate devices, with the large gable window over the altar being especially rich in ornamentation. The Church of St John was opened for worship on Christmas Day 1871 and the first service was conducted by Reverend Cocks.

On 14 August 1874 the foundation stone of the rectory was laid by Mrs William Crozier of Moorna Station, and at the same time a wooden schoolhouse and meeting room (parish hall) was opened. In 1986 the Heritage Branch was contacted in relation to a proposal to purchase the rectory for demolition to provide car park spaces for the adjoining services club.

On 9 December 1986, a section 130 order was placed over the site. On 20 March 1987, an Interim Heritage Order was placed over the buildings. In 1987 financial assistance of $16,000 made available for restoration works. A Permanent Conservation Order was placed on 23 March 1989. On 2 April 1999 St John's Anglican Church and Rectory was transferred to the State Heritage Register.

== Description ==
St John's Anglican Church is built of random rubble with red face brick quoins and buttresses. The random rubble walls have been bagged and the brickwork has rendered and painted highlights. The roof of the church and the spire are clad in galvanised iron over a cedar hammerbeam roof truss frame. The internal roof lining, the pulpit and pews of the church are also made of cedar. The windows in the church are of a lancet type, are leadlighted and included coloured and etched glass inserts.

The rectory to St John's Church is a large single-storey building constructed of random rubble and has been rendered. It has a corrugated-iron roof and a wrap-around verandah supported by cylindrical columns on cement blocks. The four brick chimney stacks have slender cast iron pots. It is located by the church.

=== Modifications and dates ===
On 28 May 1987 the NSW Heritage Council gave approval to replace a back verandah and sleepout from the rectory and replace with an extension containing two bedrooms and a family room.

== Heritage listing ==
As at 27 August 2008, constructed in 1871 St John's Church and Rectory was the first Anglican church built on the Darling River, being constructed only six years after a diocese was formed in Goulburn. The church and rectory were probably the first substantial buildings constructed in Wentworth. St John's Anglican Church and Rectory represents the link between the early settlement and development of the Murray Darling basin. The buildings are of scientific interest because of their method of construction, a combination of random rubble and brickwork, a method uncommon in the state.

St John's Anglican Church was listed on the New South Wales State Heritage Register on 2 April 1999 having satisfied the following criteria.

The place is important in demonstrating the course, or pattern, of cultural or natural history in New South Wales.

Constructed in 1871, St John's Church and Rectory were the first Anglican church built on the Darling River, being constructed only six years after a diocese was formed in Goulburn. The church and rectory were probably the first substantial buildings constructed in Wentworth. St John's Anglican Church and Rectory represents the link between the early settlement and development of the Murray Darling basin.

The place is important in demonstrating aesthetic characteristics and/or a high degree of creative or technical achievement in New South Wales.

The church and rectory form an important part of a "civic building" precinct in the main street of Wentworth on the banks of the Darling River. The church is an extremely important streetscape item with its prominent iron spire and steeply pitched roof.

The place has potential to yield information that will contribute to an understanding of the cultural or natural history of New South Wales.

The buildings are of scientific interest because of their method of construction, a combination of random rubble and brickwork, a method uncommon in the state.

== See also ==
- Anglican Diocese of Goulburn
- Anglican Diocese of Riverina
