= St. John's Church (Portsmouth, New Hampshire) =

Historic church in New Hampshire, United States

- U.S. National Register of Historic Places
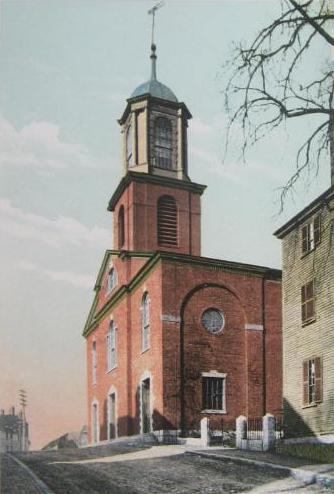

- Location within New Hampshire Location within the United States
- Location: 105 Chapel St., Portsmouth, New Hampshire
- Coordinates: 43°4′42″N 70°45′20″W
- Area: 2 acres (0.81 ha)
- Built: 1807
- Architect: Alexander Parris
- Architectural style: Federal
- NRHP reference No.: 78000417
- Added to NRHP: January 31, 1978

St. John's Church is a historic church at 101 Chapel Street in Portsmouth, New Hampshire, United States. The brick building was designed by Alexander Parris and built in 1807; it was the first brick church in the state of New Hampshire, and is a rare surviving early design by Parris. The building was listed on the National Register of Historic Places in 1978. The church is home to an Episcopal congregation organized in 1732, with roots in the city's 17th-century founding.

The church reported 1121 members in 2016 and 726 members in 2023; no membership statistics were reported in 2024 parochial reports. Plate and pledge income reported for the congregation in 2024 was $828,137 with average Sunday attendance (ASA) of 211 persons.

== Description and history ==
St. John's Church is located on the east side of downtown Portsmouth, between Church and Bow streets near the city's eastern waterfront. It is a two-story brick building, facing west toward Church Street. Its main facade has a slightly projecting center section, which has a recessed entry, as do the two flanking bays. Above each of these entries are Palladian windows. The triangular gable pediment has a lunette window in its tympanum. The interior space is predominantly filled with slip pews, although some original box pews survive in the galleries. The interior ceiling was painted with a trompe-l'œil coffered ceiling in 1848.

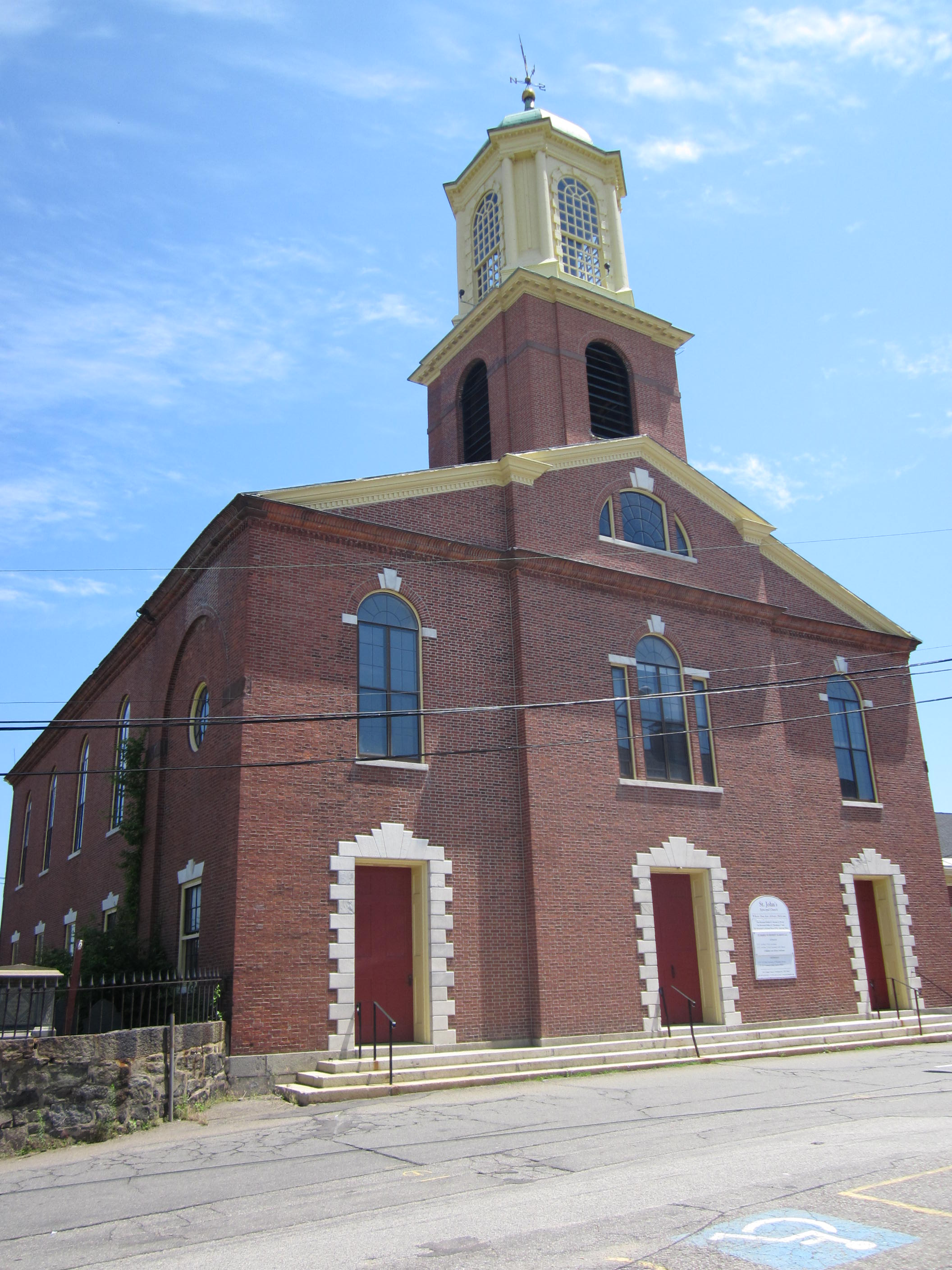

Portsmouth's Episcopalian congregational history dates to 1638, when a church was established in the Strawbery Banke area. This congregation's minister was forced out by Massachusetts Bay Colony authorities. (Portsmouth was at the time subject to oversight by that colony's Puritan leaders.) In 1732 a new congregation was organized, and established in a wooden church on the site of the present St. John's. That church burned in a major fire in 1806 that destroyed more than 300 buildings in the city. The present edifice was erected in 1807, and was the first brick church building in the state. It is also one of the first works of architect Alexander Parris, before he became well known for his work in Boston and elsewhere.

== See also ==
- National Register of Historic Places listings in Rockingham County, New Hampshire
