= St. John's Church (Chuckatuck, Virginia) =

Historic church in Virginia, US

- U.S. National Register of Historic Places
- Virginia Landmarks Register
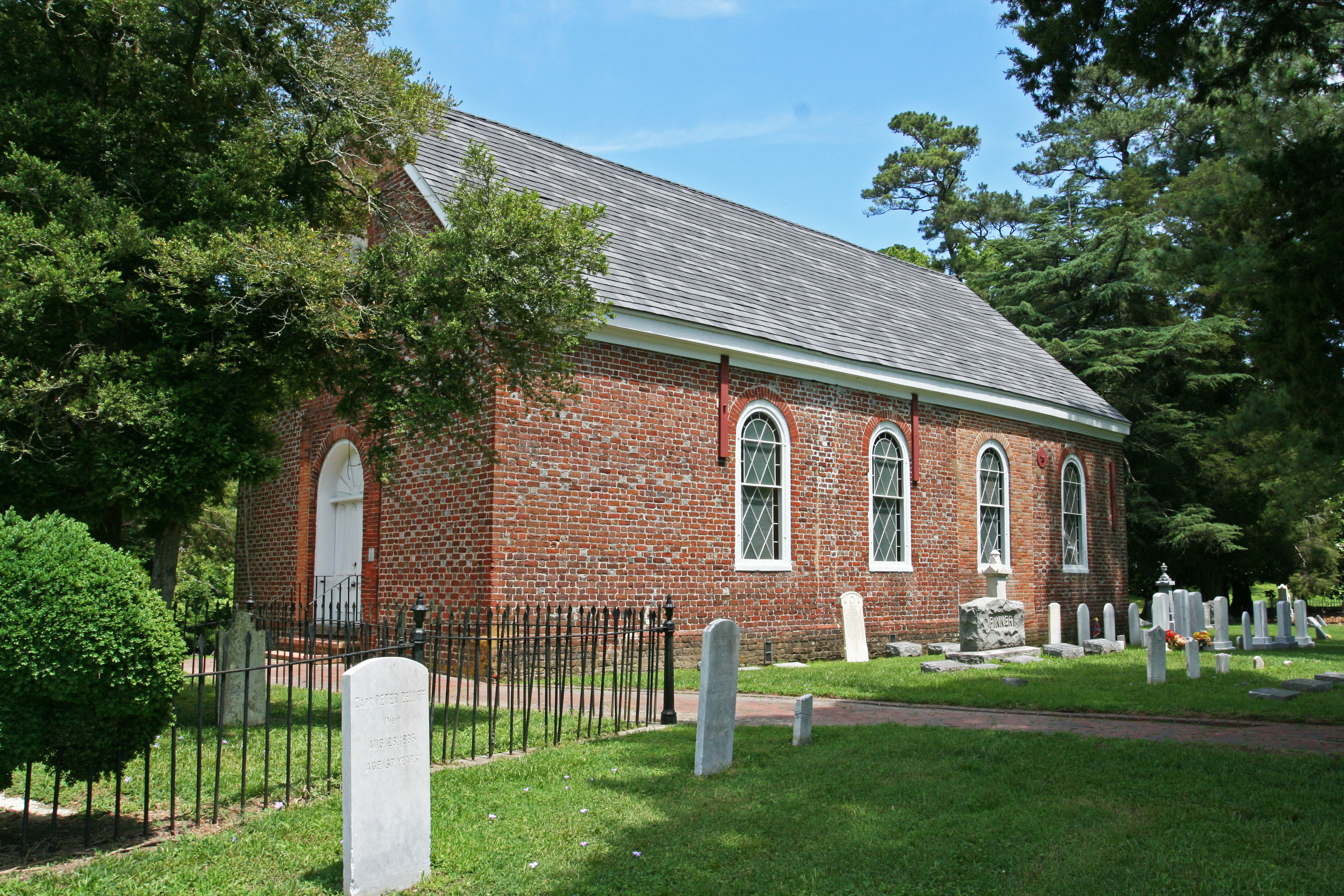
- St. John's Church in 2015

- Location within Virginia Location within the United States
- Location: E of Chuckatuck on VA 125, near Chuckatuck, Virginia
- Coordinates: 36°51′25″N 76°33′41″W
- Area: 6.3 acres (2.5 ha)
- Built: 1755
- NRHP reference No.: 73002149
- VLR No.: 133-0017

Significant dates
- Added to NRHP: April 11, 1973
- Designated VLR: October 17, 1972

St. John's Church, also known as Chuckatuck Church, is a historic Episcopal church located near Chuckatuck. Constructed in 1755, St. John's is the third church to occupy the site in a parish which was established in 1642. St. John's Church preserves an important role in the religious history of seventeenth-century Virginia and as an architectural example of the evolving preferences of the Episcopal Church in the nineteenth century.

It was added to the National Register of Historic Places in 1973.

== History ==
St. John's Church traces its origins to 1642 when the recently created Nansemond (originally Upper Norfolk) County was divided into three parishes: east, west, and south. St. John's Church was established within the West Parish which was renamed after the nearby village of Chuckatuck. Early English settlers along the Nansemond River were not wholly supportive of the Anglican faith, instead welcoming ministers and adherents of the Puritan and Quaker traditions into the community. George Fox, a founder of the Society of Friends (Quakers) visited Nansemond in 1672 and found four active meetings in the region. The presence of such strong dissenting communities and squabbles between the three Anglican vestries in Nansemond often led to quarrels that involved the Royal Governor and his council.

Little record of the first church of Chuckatuck Parish survives. Archaeological surveys on the site of the present St. John's Church have uncovered the foundation of a bell tower southeast of the entrance to the existing church, possibly dating from the original seventeenth-century structure. A second building may have been constructed on the site around the turn of the eighteenth century. In 1725, the former west (Chuckatuck) and east (Lower) parishes were merged into the new Suffolk Parish. In 1751 the vestry of Suffolk Parish decided to erect a brick church to replace the earlier frame building at Chuckatuck, documented through an advertisement placed in the Virginia Gazette on April 24, 1752. The new St. John's Church was completed in 1755, after which the earlier structure was razed.

St. John's Church ceased to function after the Disestablishment. The church was reorganized in 1826 after which time the parish was formally renamed St. Johns.

== Architecture ==
St. John's Church is reflective of the changing social and spiritual culture of the Episcopal Church in Virginia over the eighteenth and nineteenth centuries. The 1755 structure is a Georgian styled building in the traditional rectangular plan measuring 60 feet, 10 inches, by 30 feet, 6 inches. The brick walls are approximately 21 inches in thickness and are laid in Flemish bond above and below the watertable. The southwest facade is accented with glazed headers, while the remaining walls are laid with random glazed headers. Originally, there were two entrances to the church on the southwest and southeast sides. St. Johns is unusual for the fact that it is not oriented with the altar facing east as is the tradition for eighteenth century churches in Virginia. Though significantly altered today, hints as to the original appearance of St. John's can be deduced from the remnants still present on the building. The southwest entrance is framed by two brick pilasters of rubbed brick, but the original pediment overhead has been removed, evidenced by patchwork above the door. The southeast facade of the building preserves the location of the original second entrance which was patched with bricks that are lighter in color to the original ones. When originally constructed, the roof featured clipped gables on the northeast and southwest facades, but these were later removed and the ends filled in with brick to make a gable roof over the entire structure.

When St. John's was restored to use in the 1820s, the configuration of the old church still met the preferences of most pre-Oxford Movement Episcopal Churches in the region which emphasized the spoken word over the sacrament in the service. The original windows on the northeast altar end of St. John's originally framed the position for the communion table, but these windows were later filled in. In the 1880s, as the Episcopal Church embraced a higher liturgical form of worship, the interior of St. John's was reconfigured to create a recessed chancel, denoting a space for the sacrament apart from the rest of the church. The original windows on the altar wall were bricked over and a central window over the new raised altar was inserted. These renovations were carried out under the direction of William Whitney.
