= St. John's Church Complex (Delhi, New York) =

Historic church in New York, United States

- U.S. National Register of Historic Places
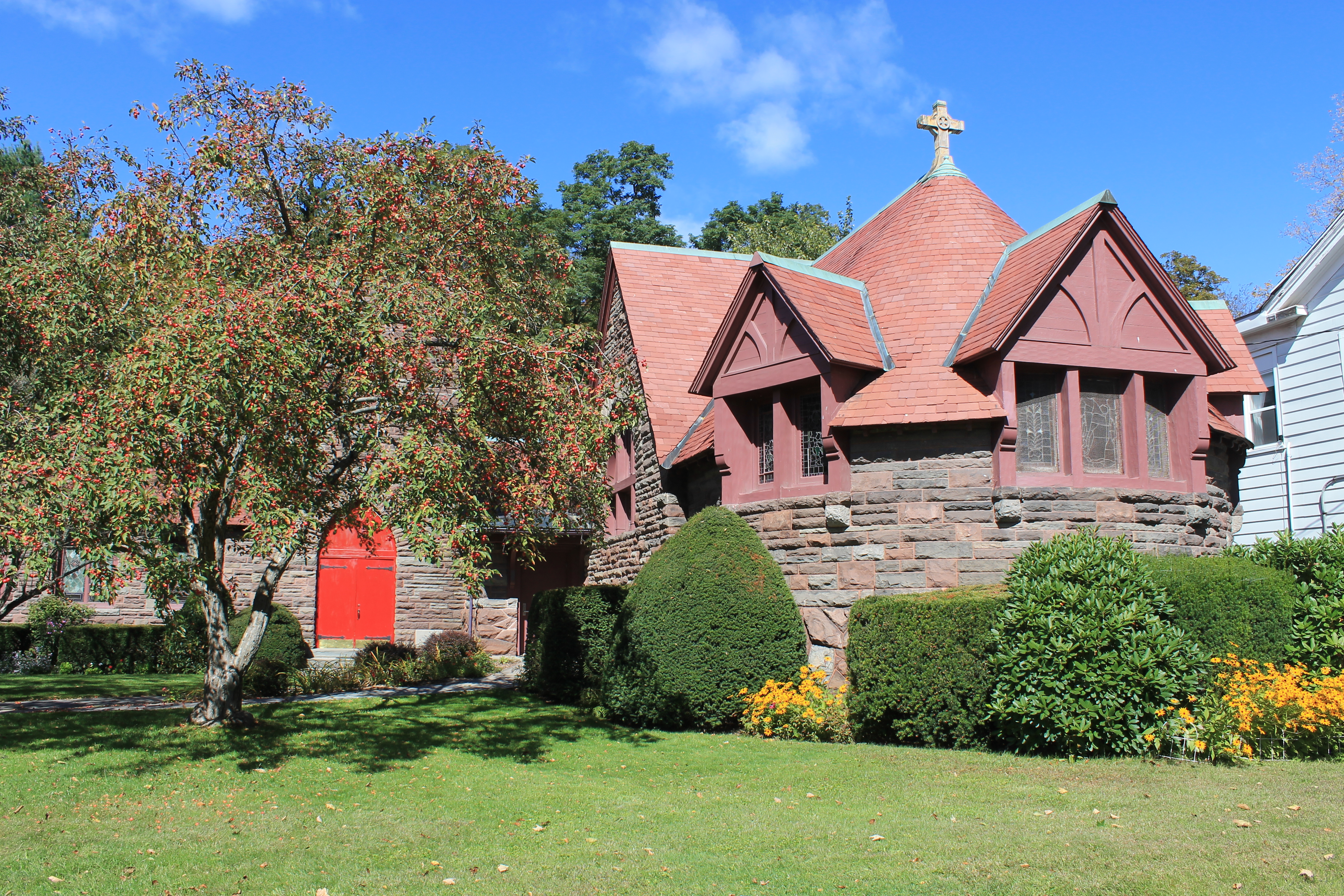
- St. John's Church

- Location within New York Location within the United States
- Location: 136 Main St., Delhi, New York
- Coordinates: 42°16′45″N 74°55′0″W
- Area: 1.2 acres (0.49 ha)
- Built: 1831
- Architect: Burling & Whitehouse; et al.
- Architectural style: Late Victorian, Late 19th And 20th Century Revivals
- NRHP reference No.: 95000879
- Added to NRHP: July 21, 1995

St. John's Church Complex is a historic Episcopal church complex at 136 Main Street in Delhi, Delaware County, New York. The complex consists of the church / chapel, parish house, rectory, rectory garage, connecting stairway, and site of the 1831 church. The centerpiece is the 1887-1888 Richardsonian Romanesque style Sheldon Memorial Chapel.

It was added to the National Register of Historic Places in 1995.

== See also ==
- National Register of Historic Places listings in Delaware County, New York
