= St. John's Episcopal Church (Ellicott City, Maryland) =

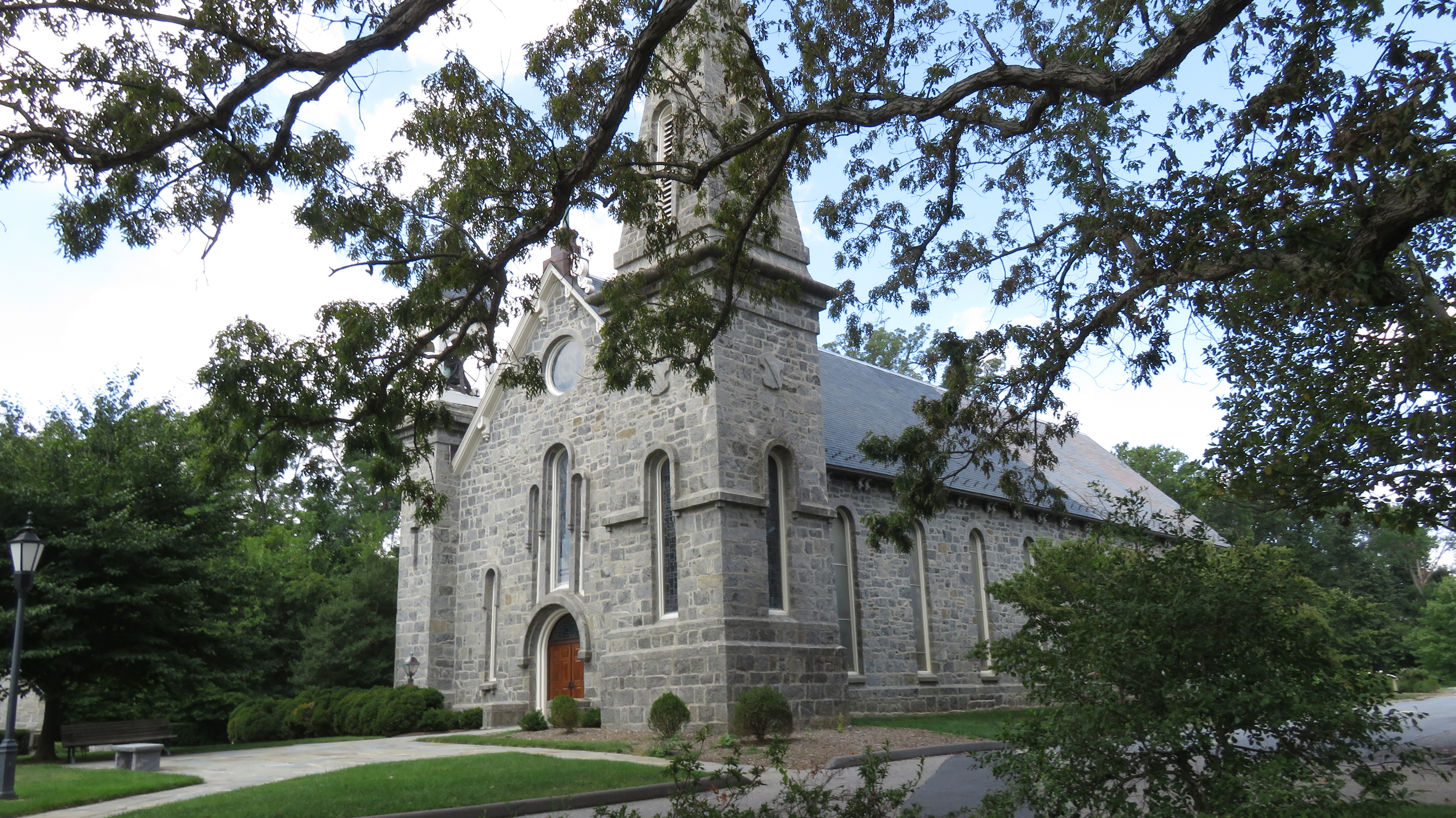
- St. John's Episcopal Church in 2015

- Location within Maryland Location within the United States
- St. John's Episcopal Church
- 39°16′23″N 76°49′42″W
- Address: 9120 Frederick Rd, Ellicott City, MD 21042
- Country: United States
- Denomination: Episcopal
- Website: www.stjohnsec.org

History
- Founded: 1822

Architecture
- Architect: Norris G. Starkweather
- Architectural type: Romanesque
- Completed: 1823

Administration
- Diocese: Maryland

Clergy
- Rector: Rev. Derek Miller

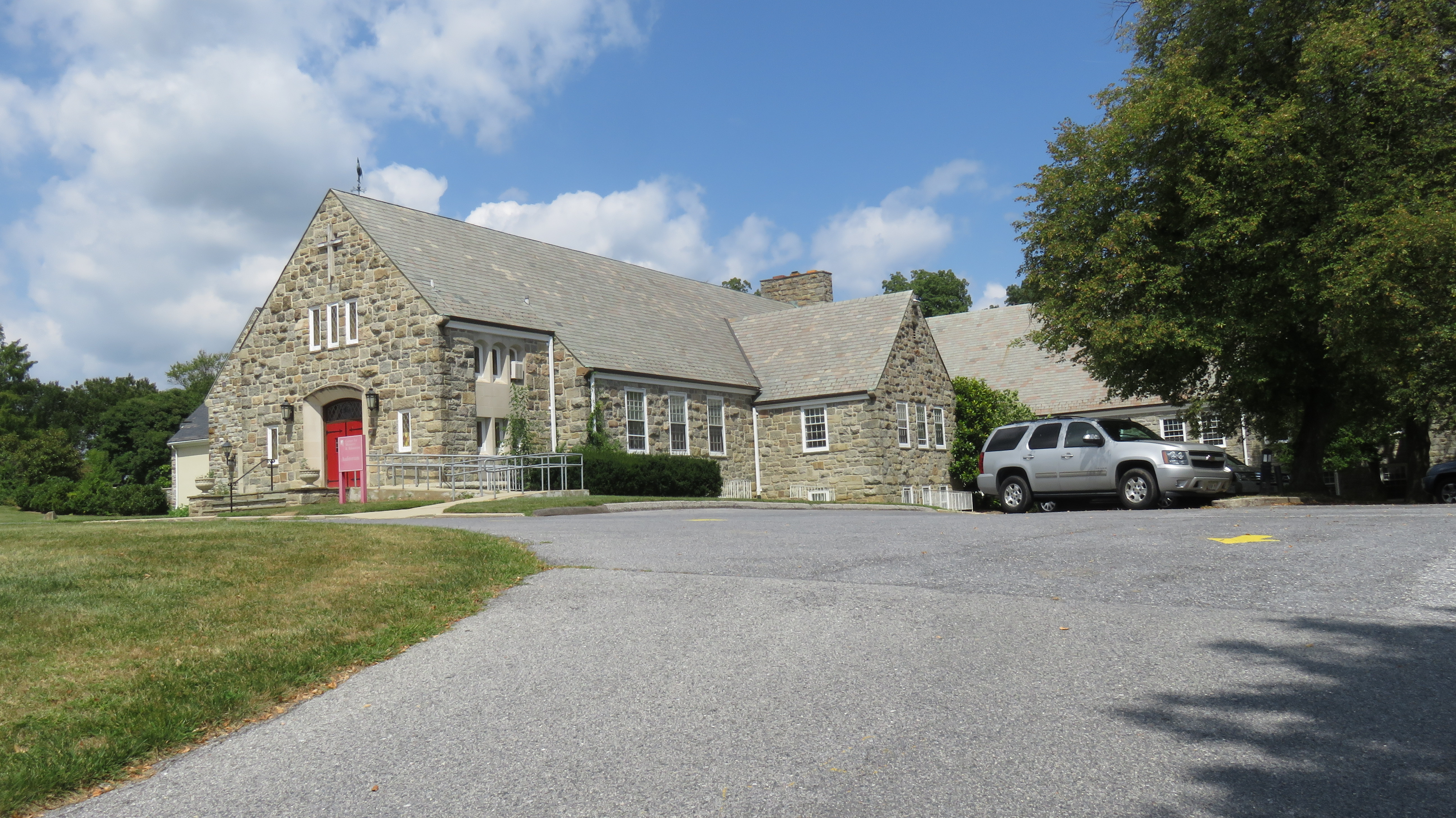
St. John's Parish Day School

St. John's Episcopal Church is located in Ellicott City in Howard County, Maryland, United States.

The church stands on a land grant originally patented as "Three Brothers". A section of the land owned by Caleb Dorsey was donated for the church. The building was erected out of local granite in 1823. The church was designed by architect Norris G. Starkweather, who also designed White Hall, Temora, and First Presbyterian Church and Manse. Dr. Charles Worthington Dorsey and George Howard oversaw the construction. The rectory was built in 1940.

== See also ==
- List of Howard County properties in the Maryland Historical Trust
