= Basilica of St. John the Baptist (Canton, Ohio) =

Historic church in Ohio, United States

Basilica of Saint John the Baptist
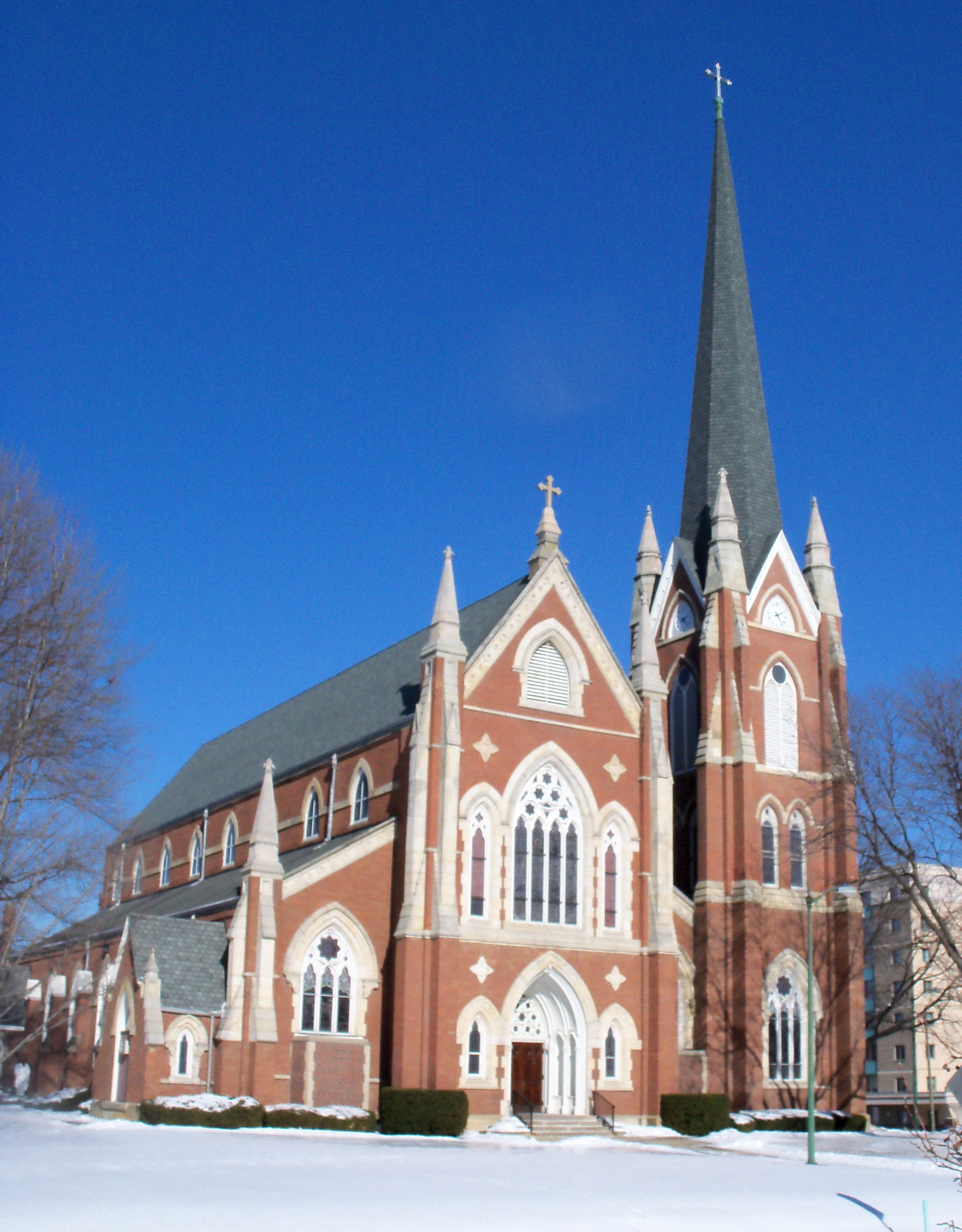
- Basilica of Saint John the Baptist
- 40.8033°N 81.3772°W
- Location: 627 McKinley Avenue NW; Canton, Ohio
- Country: United States
- Denomination: Roman Catholic Church
- Website: www.stjohncanton.com

History
- Founded: 1823
- Dedication: 1872

Architecture
- Architect: James Renwick Jr.
- Completed: 1871

Administration
- Diocese: Youngstown

Clergy
- Rector: The Very Reverend John E. Sheridan
- St. John's Catholic Church
- U.S. National Register of Historic Places
- NRHP reference No.: 75001533
- Added to NRHP: 27 May 1975

The Basilica of Saint John the Baptist is a Catholic church in Canton, Ohio, United States.

== History ==
The building was designed by American architect James Renwick Jr. (1818–1895). Construction was completed in 1871, and the church was dedicated in 1872.

Saint John the Baptist was elevated to a minor basilica on June 19, 2012. Bishop George V. Murry of Youngstown was the celebrant, assisted by his vicar general, Fr Robert Siffrin.

The pSt John the Baptist is the "oldest Catholic parish in northeastern Ohio", having been established in 1823.

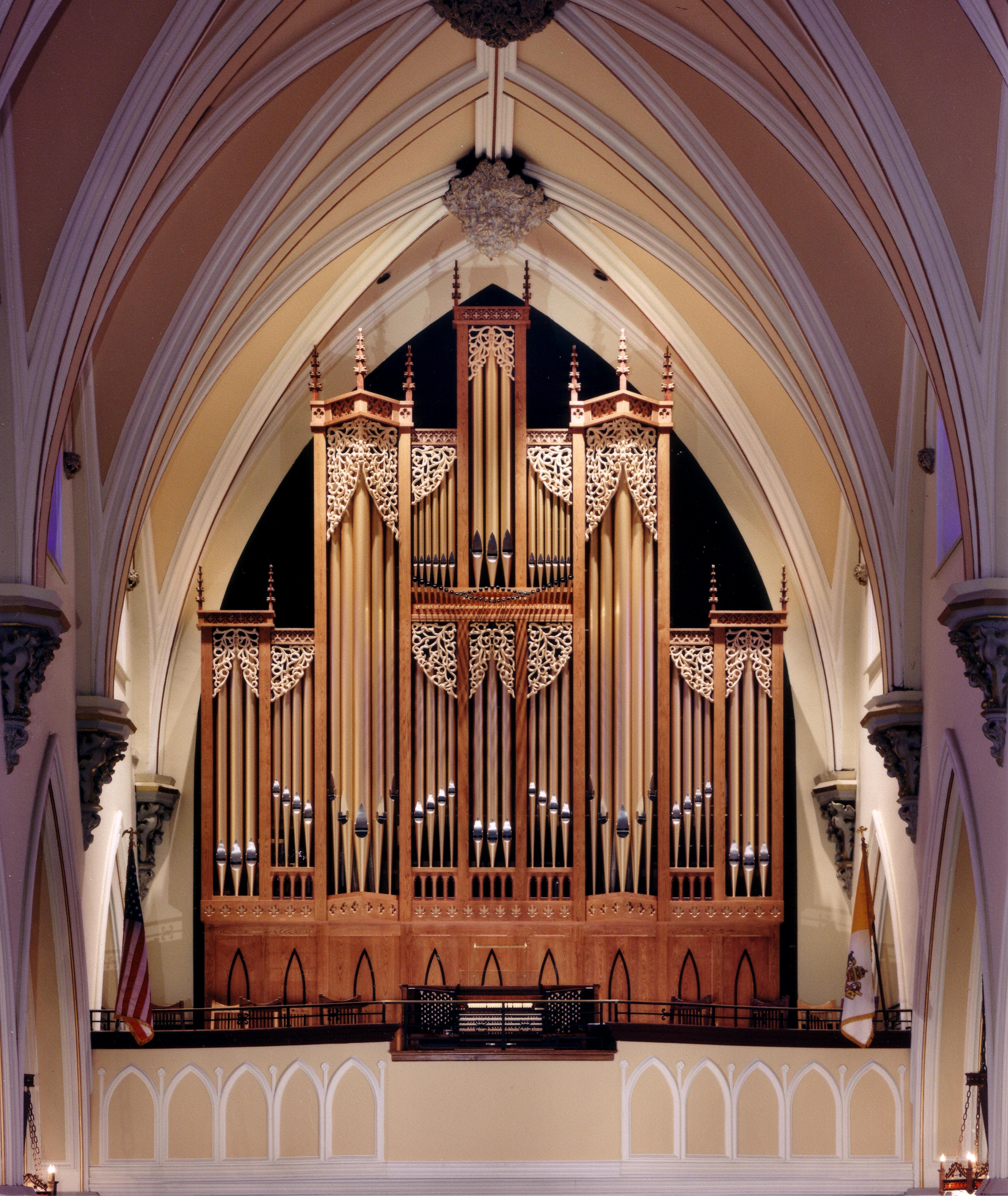

The Basilica houses a seventy-nine rank pipe organ built by Kegg Pipe Organ Builders of Hartville, Ohio. The specifications can be obtained here.

Fr Ronald M. Klingler served as pastor/rector for thirty years until his retirement on August 1, 2017. Fr John E. Sheridan was appointed the second rector of the basilica on August 1, 2017.
