= Listed buildings in Over Wyresdale =

Over Wyresdale is a civil parish in Lancaster, Lancashire, England. It contains 53 buildings that are recorded in the National Heritage List for England as designated listed buildings. Of these, one is at Grade II*, the middle grade, and the others are at Grade II, the lowest grade.

The parish is mainly rural, containing several small settlements, including Abbeystead. Most of the listed buildings are houses and associated structures, farmhouses and farm buildings. The largest house in the parish is Abbeystead House; this and associated structures are listed. The other listed buildings include a former mill, a church, milestones, bridges, a school, a pound, a boundary stone, and a telephone kiosk.

== Key ==
Grade	Criteria
II*	Particularly important buildings of more than special interest
II	Buildings of national importance and special interest

== Buildings ==
Name and location	Photograph	Date	Notes	Grade
Hawthornthwaite Farmhouse; 53.97647°N 2.66370°W	—	1674	A sandstone house with a stone-slate roof, in two storeys and three bays with a rear wing. The windows are mullioned. The doorway has a chamfered surround, and a porch with monolithic sides and a roof of pitched flags.	II
Farm building, Catshaw Hall Farm; 53.97642°N 2.69216°W	—	Late 17th century (probable)	A sandstone building with a stone-slate roof, it is in a single storey. In the south wall are two adjacent doorways, and in the apex of the west gable is a chamfered opening with a perch.	II
Eastern Barn; 53.99513°N 2.62813°W	—	Late 17th century	The barn was probably originally a house. It is in sandstone with a tiled roof, and has two storeys. It contains three doorways, windows, one with a remaining mullion, and two pitching holes. To the right is an added lean-to containing a re-set stone inscribed with initials and a date.	II
Low Moor Head (eastern house) and barn 53.99947°N 2.70179°W	—	Late 17th century	The house and barn are in stone with a stone-slate roof. The house has two storeys, and some of the windows have retained their mullions. On the front is a porch, and above the doorway is a re-set inscribed battlemented lintel. The barn to the east dates probably from the early 19th century; it has a wide entrance with a sliding door, doorways, and windows.	II
Marshaw Cottage and White Moor Cottage; 53.97584°N 2.62497°W	—	Late 17th century	Two stone houses with a stone-slate roof in two storeys, later altered and extended. The windows are irregularly placed, and of different types, including sash windows and some with mullions.	II
Lower Greenbank; 53.98272°N 2.72463°W	—	1676	A stone house with a slate roof, in two storeys with an attic and two bays. The windows are of varying types, some are mullioned, some are sash windows, and others are modern. In the attic are two timber dormers. The doorway has a chamfered surround and a shaped inscribed lintel.	II
Catshaw Hall Farmhouse; 53.97632°N 2.69252°W	—	1678	The house is in stone with a slate roof, and is in two storeys and two bays. The windows have mullions and transoms, and the doorway has a moulded surround and an inscribed shaped lintel. To the left is an 18th-century extension with mullioned windows, and inside the house is a bressumer.	II
Boundary stone 54.00982°N 2.69990°W	—	1692	The stone marks the boundary with the parish of Quernmore. It is in sandstone and has a rhomboid plan. There are inscriptions on the top and on the southeast face,	II
Lower Lee (Kenyon's) Farmhouse and barn 53.99139°N 2.66150°W	—	1694	The house and barn are in sandstone with a slate roof. The house has two storeys, and the original part has four bays. Most of the windows are sashes, and the doorway has an inscribed shaped lintel. There is an extension to the right containing pigeon holes. The barn to the right of this, contains a wide opening, windows, and ventilation slits.	II
Lower Castle O' Trim Farmhouse and barn 53.99398°N 2.72135°W	—	1711	A stone house and barn with slate roofs. The house is pebbledashed, with two storeys and three bays. Some of the mullions have been retained in the windows, and the doorway has a moulded surround and an inscribed battlemented lintel. Inside the house is a bressumer. The barn to the right has a wide entrance and a pitching hole.	II
Beech Farmhouse; 53.98439°N 2.71426°W	—	1713	A stone house with a slate roof, in two storeys and three bays. The entrance was originally on the southeast front. It contains mullioned windows, and a doorway, now blocked, with an inscribed lintel. The doorway is now on the other side.	II
Higher Lee; 53.99576°N 2.66771°W		c. 1720	The house is in sandstone with a stone-slate roof, in two storeys with an attic, and it has a symmetrical front of five bays. The doorway has a moulded surround, and the windows on the front are sashes with architraves. On the gables are ball finials. At the rear is some re-used 17th-century material including mullioned windows, a doorway with an inscribed shaped lintel, and another wide decorated lintel.	II*
Gate piers, Higher Lee; 53.99561°N 2.66765°W	—	Early 18th century	The pair of gate piers is in sandstone. Each pier is in a square plan, and has a moulded cornice and a ball finial.	II
Caw Mill; 53.97939°N 2.70182°W	—	Early 18th century (possible)	Originally a water-powered corn mill, later used for other purposes. It is in sandstone with a roof of slate and stone-slate, and built on a slope with one storey at one end and two at the other. Its openings include a wheel opening, windows and doors (some of which are blocked), a pitching hole, and a pair of blocked wide entrances, one of which has an inscribed pier.	II
Outbuildings, Higher Lee; 53.99586°N 2.66774°W	—	Early 18th century (probable)	The outbuildings were originally probably a coach house, stables and a cottage, and have since been converted for other purposes. They are in sandstone with a stone-slate roof and have two storeys. The openings include doorways, windows, pigeon holes, oval openings (now blocked), and a wide opening with a concrete lintel.	II
Outbuilding, Higher Lee; 53.99586°N 2.66774°W	—	Early 18th century	The outbuilding is in sandstone and is without a roof.	II
Gornalls Farmhouse; 53.99519°N 2.62883°W	—	1730	The house is in sandstone with a slate roof, and has two storeys with an attic and two bays. The windows, formerly mullioned, have chamfered surrounds, and the doorway has a moulded surround and an inscribed lintel.	II
Christ Church; 53.98394°N 2.68594°W		1733	The church was remodelled in 1892–94 by John Douglas who also added a short chancel. It is in sandstone with a slate roof, and consists of a nave, a chancel, a south porch, a north vestry, and a west tower. The chancel has diagonal buttresses, corner gargoyles, an embattled parapet, and a short set-back spire. The south doorway has a round head, Doric pilasters, and a fluted keystone.	II
Low Moor Head (south-west house); 53.99926°N 2.70313°W	—	Early to mid 18th century	A sandstone house with a stone-slate roof, in two storeys and two bays. Most of the windows have lost their mullions, and between the bays is a porch with an elliptical arch and a keystone.	II
Chapel House Farmhouse and farm building 53.98828°N 2.68423°W	—	Mid 18th century	The house and attached building are in sandstone with slate roofs. The house has two storeys and two bays. Some of the windows are mullioned; others have been altered. In the centre is a porch and doorway, and at the rear is a stair window. The extension to the left has a wide doorway and a window.	II
Higher Moor Head Farmhouse and barn 54.00293°N 2.69975°W	—	Mid 18th century (probable)	The house and barn are in sandstone with a stone-slate roof. The house has two storeys and four bays. The windows are of different types, including sashes, and the doorway is in the third bay. The barn to the right has various openings, including doorways, windows, and pitching holes.	II
Low Moor Head (northwest house); 53.99943°N 2.70274°W	—	Mid 18th century	This is a sandstone house with a slate roof in two storeys. The original house has two bays. Most of the mullions have been removed from the windows, and the doorway has long-and-short jambs and a pitched hood. To the right is a former two-bay farm building that has been incorporated into the house.	II
Gamekeeper's Cottage and farm building, Lower Lee; 53.99164°N 2.66167°W	—	Mid 18th century	A house and farm building in sandstone with a slate roof. The house has two storeys and four bays. Some of the windows are modern, and others are mullioned, some with the mullions removed. There are two doorways, one with a plain surround, the other with a moulded surround. The farm building has a pitching hole, and a doorway with long and short jambs.	II
Ouzel Thorn Farmhouse; 53.99440°N 2.63491°W	—	1761	A sandstone house with a slate roof, in two storeys and two bays. The windows are sashes and in one of them the mullion has been retained. Between the bays is a 19th-century gabled porch, above which is a plaque inscribed with initials and the date.	II
Little Catshaw Farmhouse and barn 53.97569°N 2.68892°W	—	1763	The house and barn are in sandstone with a slate roof. The house has two storeys and three bays. The mullions have been removed from the windows, the doorway has a plain surround, and above it is an inscribed oval plaque. The barn to the left has a wide entrance with a canopy, external steps leading to a first floor doorway, and lean-to extensions.	II
Ortner House and shed 53.98410°N 2.71389°W	—	1769	A stuccoed stone house with a slate roof in two storeys, and with a symmetrical three-bay front. The windows are sashes with architraves. In the centre is a Doric porch with a triglyph frieze and a moulded pediment containing the date. On the right gable wall is a re-set inscribed lintel. To the left and attached by a wall is a shed incorporating a re-used doorway and a re-set inscribed plaque.	II
Keepers Cottage; 53.98233°N 2.66983°W	—	1770	A sandstone house with a stone-slate roof, in two storeys with two bays. The windows, formerly mullioned, have plain surrounds, and the doorway has a gabled porch with an inscribed plaque above it.	II
Dunkenshaw and barn 53.99548°N 2.64979°W	—	Late 18th century	The house and barn are in sandstone with a slate roof. The house has two storeys and two bays. The openings have plain surrounds, the windows being sashes. The barn has a wide entrance, and a doorway with long and short jambs.	II
Lower Emmetts; 53.99442°N 2.64911°W	—	Late 18th century	A house in sandstone with a slate roof, in two storeys and three bays, The doors and windows have plain surrounds, most of the windows on the front being sashes. At the rear are two mullioned windows and a stair window.	II
Barn, Pye's Farm; 53.99530°N 2.63068°W	—	c. 1800 (probable)	A barn and shippon incorporating parts of a 17th-century house. It is in sandstone with stone-slate roof, and contains a wide entrance with a segmental arch, doorways (one with a triangular head), windows, and a pitching hole.	II
Milestone; 53.98996°N 2.65716°W	—	c. 1800	The milestone is in sandstone, and has a rectangular plan and a rounded shouldered top. It face is inscribed with '7'.	II
Milestone; 53.98185°N 2.63640°W	—	c. 1800	The milestone is in sandstone, and has a rectangular plan and a rounded shouldered top. It face is inscribed with '8'.	II
Milestone; 53.97471°N 2.62010°W	—	c. 1800	The milestone is in sandstone, and has a rectangular plan and a rounded shouldered top. It face is inscribed with '9'.	II
Border Side Farmhouse and barn 53.98387°N 2.64198°W	—	Early 19th century	The house and barn are in sandstone. The house has a slate roof, it is in two storeys and two bays, and has sash windows. The barn incorporates 17th-century material and has a stone-slate roof. It has a wide entrance, a blocked mullioned window, and a doorway with a shaped lintel inscribed with initials and the date 1676.	II
Lee Bridge; 53.99098°N 2.65971°W	—	Early 19th century	The bridge carries a road over the Tarnbrook Wyre. It is in sandstone and consists of a single elliptical arch and has a solid parapet with a rounded top.	II
Grizedale Bridge; 53.99182°N 2.66346°W		Early 19th century	The bridge carries Bakehouse Brow over the River Grizedale. It is in sandstone and consists of a single elliptical arch and has a solid parapet with a rounded top.	II
Summer house, Lower Lee; 53.99093°N 2.66186°W	—	Early 19th century	The summer house is in sandstone with a hipped slate roof. It has a square plan and is in two storeys. There are sash windows on three sides, and on the other side external steps with an iron balustrade lead to a first floor doorway. There is another doorway on the south side.	II
Summer house, Ortner; 53.98547°N 2.71091°W		Early 19th century	The summer house is in sandstone with a hipped slate roof. It has a square plan and is in two storeys. There are windows on three sides, with plain surrounds, and on the other side external steps lead to a first floor doorway. There is another doorway on the south side.	II
Tower Lodge; 53.97940°N 2.60505°W		Early 19th century	A house, originally intended as a shooting lodge but never completed. It is in stone with a hipped slate roof. and is in Gothick style. The house has a rectangular plan with rounded corners, and is in a single storey. The windows and doorway have pointed heads, the windows containing Y-tracery. On the front and side are circular panels with quatrefoils.	II
Stoops Bridge; 53.98363°N 2.66735°W		Mid 19th century	The bridge carries Strait Lane over the Tarnbrook Wyre. It is in sandstone, and consists of two elliptical arches with triangular cutwaters, and has a solid parapet with a rounded top.	II
Gad House; 53.98804°N 2.66659°W	—	19th century	A cattle shelter in sandstone with a stone-slate roof in a single storey. It has an open front with five cylindrical pillars, and the interior has been divided into two compartments.	II
Tarnsyke Cottage; 53.99531°N 2.62899°W	—	Mid to late 19th century	A house incorporating 17th-century remains, in sandstone with a roof partly in slate and partly in stone-slate. It has two storeys, and the main part has two bays, with a lower part to the right. On the front, one of the windows is a sash and the others are modern. The doorway has a battlemented lintel. At the rear are mullioned windows and a stair window.	II
Cawthorne Endowed School; 53.98296°N 2.67040°W		Late 19th century	The school is in sandstone with a slate roof, and is in a single storey. There are two projections toward the road, one gabled, the other smaller with a hipped roof. The windows have elliptical heads, and are mullioned or mullioned and transomed. On the west gable of the main range is a bellcote.	II
Pound; 53.98269°N 2.67041°W	—	Late 19th century	The animal pound is in sandstone, and is roughly circular in plan. There is an opening on the south side.	II
Abbeystead; 53.98480°N 2.66143°W		1885–87	A country house by Douglas and Fordham in Elizabethan style. It is in sandstone with slate roofs, in two storeys and attics, and has two main ranges at right angles. The principal range has five bays, three of them gabled with ball finials. The windows are mullioned or mullioned and transomed. The doorway has a Tudor arch with a coat of arms above, and on the east side of the house is a four-storey tower.	II
Terrace wall and steps, Abbeystead; 53.98461°N 2.66141°W	—	1887 (probable)	The terrace retaining wall is in sandstone, and has rectangular chamfered balusters forming arches under a coping. At the ends are square piers, most with ball finials, and at the ends and in the centre are flights of steps.	II
Lancaster Lodge; 53.98413°N 2.66579°W		1887	A lodge to Abbeystead House by Douglas and Fordham in Elizabethan style. It is in sandstone with a slate roof, and has an L-shaped plan with two storeys. The windows are mullioned, and the doorway has a moulded surround and a shaped lintel inscribed with the date.	II
York Lodge; 53.98657°N 2.64916°W	—	c. 1890	A lodge to Abbeystead House in sandstone with a hipped slate roof. It has a single storey, and contains mullioned windows. Facing the road is a hipped wing and a chamfered doorway, and facing the drive is a canted bay window.	II
Bothy Cottage and other buildings 53.98230°N 2.67042°W	—	c. 1890	These consist of estate workshops and living accommodation, they are in sandstone with slate roofs, and in two storeys. Bothy cottage has a wide entrance and gabled dormers. The building to the north has a doorway with a moulded surround and a shaped lintel, and on the roof is a timber louvre. On all the gables are ball finials.	II
Home Farmhouse and farm building 53.98280°N 2.66977°W	—	1891–92	A house and adjoining building by Douglas and Fordham in Elizabethan style. They are in sandstone with a slate roof. The house has two storeys and a projecting wing. The windows are mullioned or mullioned and transomed, and the doorway has a moulded surround and a shaped lintel inscribed with the date. The gables are coped with ball finials. There is a single-storey link to the farm building that contains two elliptical arches, a loading door, windows and doorways.	II
Post House and Farm Cottage; 53.98258°N 2.67062°W	—	1892	A pair of sandstone houses with a slate roof, incorporating 17th-century material, in two storeys with mullioned windows. The cottage forms a cross-wing to Post House. Both houses have a doorway with a moulded surround and a battlemented lintel inscribed with initials and the date.	II
Boundary stone 53.97406°N 2.58075°W		1897	The stone marks the boundary between the historic counties of Lancashire and Yorkshire. It is in sandstone, triangular in section, and with a sloping top. The stone carries inscriptions, including the date, the distances in miles to Whitewell, Clitheroe, Lancaster, and Bay Horse, together with the maker's name.	II
Telephone kiosk 53.98264°N 2.67091°W	—	1935	A K6 type telephone kiosk, designed by Giles Gilbert Scott. Constructed in cast iron with a square plan and a dome, it has three unperforated crowns in the top panels.	II
