= Bay Horse =

Bay Horse may refer to:

== Pubs in England ==
- Bay Horse, Blossom Street, a pub in York
- The Bay Horse, Hutton Rudby, a pub in North Yorkshire
- Bay Horse, Market Weighton, a pub in the East Riding of Yorkshire
- Bay Horse, Monkgate, a pub in York
- Roots (restaurant), a restaurant in York, formerly known as the "Bay Horse" pub

== Other uses ==
- Bay Horse (hamlet), a hamlet in Lancashire, England
  - Bay Horse railway station, a former railway station
- Bay (horse), a horse coat colour
