= Listed buildings in Ellel, Lancashire =

Ellel is a civil parish in Lancaster, Lancashire, England. It contains 47 listed buildings that are recorded in the National Heritage List for England. Of these, one is listed at Grade II*, the middle grade, and the others are at Grade II. The parish contains the villages of Galgate and Dolphinholme, and is otherwise rural. A high proportion of the listed buildings are country houses, smaller houses and cottages, farmhouses and farm buildings. In the 18th and 19th centuries silk spinning took place in Galgate, and two silk mills, later converted for other uses, are listed. The Lancaster Canal passes through the parish, and the junction with its Glasson Branch is also in the parish. Associated with these are listed bridges, locks, and an aqueduct. Bridges over the Rivers Wyre and Conder are also listed. Other listed buildings include a public house, churches and structures in churchyards (including a family mausoleum), a milestone, a war memorial. and boundary stones.

== Key ==
Grade	Criteria
II*	Particularly important buildings of more than special interest
II	Buildings of national importance and special interest

== Buildings ==
Name and location	Photograph	Date	Notes	Grade
Chapel Cottages; 53.99453°N 2.78782°W	—	c. 1600	A long stone house with a slate roof in two low storeys and with irregularly-spaced openings. The doorway has long-and-short jambs. Inside the house are three cruck trusses, exposed timber-framing, and plasterwork decoration including a vine and a peacock.	II
Nook House Farmhouse; 53.98840°N 2.74092°W	—	Late 17th century	A stone house with a slate roof, it has two storeys and two bays. The windows have three lights and are mullioned. In the centre is a gabled porch with a stone-slate roof. On the right is a bay added in about 1800.	II
Welby Crag Farmhouse; 54.00408°N 2.74129°W	—	Late 17th century	The house is in sandstone and has a slate roof. It is in two storeys and has a two-bay front. The doorway has a chamfered surround, and above it is a battlemented lintel inscribed with initials and a date. On the front is a modern glazed porch.	II
Hay Carr Cottage (northern house); 53.96978°N 2.78470°W	—	1687	The house was altered in the 19th and 20th centuries. It is in sandstone with a slate roof, and has two storeys and two bays. The windows are mullioned. The central doorway has a modern porch, a moulded surround, and a shaped lintel inscribed with the date and initials.	II
Heversham House Farmhouse; 53.98860°N 2.73489°W	—	1698	The house is in sandstone with a slate roof, and in two storeys with an attic. The windows are mullioned. The doorway has a chamfered surround, and above it is a battlemented lintel inscribed with the date and initials. At the rear is a stair turret.	II
Stirzakers Farmhouse; 53.97326°N 2.77936°W	—	c. 1700 (probable)	A stone house with a stone-slate roof in two storeys. The main part has two bays, and there is another, lower, bay to the left. The windows are sashes, one of which has a mullion. There is a bolection-moulded doorcase flanked by Doric pilasters carrying a blank frieze and a moulded cornice.	II
31 Chapel Street; 53.99276°N 2.78786°W	—	1701	A sandstone house with a slate roof, in two storeys with an attic, and with three bays. The windows on the front are sashes, and on the back they are mullioned. In the left bay is a former doorway, now converted into a window, above which is an inscribed lintel. Inside the house is a timber-framed partition with wattle and daub infill.	II
Bantons Farmhouse; 53.96705°N 2.74076°W	—	1747	A sandstone house with a slate roof, in two storeys and three bays. The windows have chamfered surrounds, and the mullions have been removed. The door has a stone surround, and above it is an oval plaque inscribed with the date and initials.	II
Fleece Hotel and stables 53.97256°N 2.74995°W		Mid-18th century	A public house in sandstone with tiled roofs, in two storeys. The original block has two bays and mullioned windows. To the left is a former doorway, later converted into a sash window. To the left of the original block the former barn has been incorporated into the hotel; this has sash windows and a modern entrance. Further to the left are stables with a slate roof, three doorways on the ground floor, and one on the upper floor reached by a flight of external cantilevered stone steps.	II
Hang Yeat; 53.97340°N 2.78358°W	—	18th century (probable)	The house was reconstructed in the late 19th century. It is in sandstone with a slate roof, and has two storeys and a three-bay front. The central doorway has a chamfered surround, and the windows are mullioned.	II
Lower Starbank Farmhouse; 53.98102°N 2.73352°W	—	Mid-18th century	A sandstone house with a modern tiled roof, it has two storeys and three bays. The windows have two lights and are mullioned. The doorway has a plain surround, and there are also traces of a blocked doorway.	II
Milestone; 53.96490°N 2.76905°W	—	18th century	The milestone is in sandstone and has a rounded top. Its front is inscribed with "6".	II
Dolphinholme Bridge; 53.97468°N 2.73456°W	—	1791	The bridge carries Waggon Road over the River Wyre. It is in sandstone, and consists of a single segmental arch. The bridge has alternately projecting voussoirs, a string course below a solid parapet with shaped coping, and there are two pairs of end piers. One of the voussoirs is inscribed with initials and the date.	II
Galgate Silk Mill; 53.99554°N 2.78704°W		1792	Originally converted from a water-powered cotton mill, the silk mill was extended in the 1830s. It closed in 1971 and has since been converted into factory units. The mill is in sandstone with slate roofs. The original block has three storeys and eleven bays, with a circular stair tower. The 1830s block is in two and three storeys and has seven shallow gables facing the street.	II
19A and 19–28 Corless Cottages; 53.97429°N 2.73924°W		1796	A row of mill workers' houses in Dolphinholme, with a shop and post office at the left end. They are in sandstone with slate roofs, in three storeys, and each house has a single-bay front. At the left, the shop has a two-storey extension, The openings have plain surrounds and most of the windows are sashes. On the left end is a modern shop front.	II
Hay Carr Bridge (No.83); 53.97023°N 2.78486°W		1797	This is an accommodation bridge over the Lancaster Canal. It is in sandstone and consists of a single elliptical arch with a stepped keystone, a solid parapet, and rounded coping.	II
Ellel Grange Bridge (No.84); 53.97722°N 2.78959°W		1797	This is an accommodation bridge over the Lancaster Canal leading to Ellel Grange. It is in sandstone and consists of a single elliptical arch with a stepped keystone, and has a weathered coping. The parapet has balusters in groups of five, and was possibly altered in about 1860.	II
Double Bridge (No.85); 53.98241°N 2.79214°W		1797	This is an accommodation bridge over the Lancaster Canal. It is in sandstone and consists of a single elliptical arch with a stepped keystone, a solid parapet, and rounded coping. It carries two tracks separated by a wall.	II
Galgate Bridge (No. 86); 53.98875°N 2.79093°W		1797	This is an accommodation bridge over the Lancaster Canal. It is in sandstone and consists of a single elliptical arch with a stepped keystone, a solid parapet, and rounded coping.	II
Aqueduct (No. 87); 53.98974°N 2.79622°W		1797	The aqueduct carries the Lancaster Canal over the River Conder. It is in sandstone and consists of a single segmental arch flanked by piers. Above the arch the wall is battered with a concave plan and it has a solid parapet.	II
Ellel Hall Bridge (No.88); 53.99185°N 2.79832°W		1797	The bridge carries Conder Green Road over the Lancaster Canal. It is in sandstone and consists of a single elliptical arch with a triple keystone, a solid parapet, and rounded coping.	II
Barker House Farmhouse; 54.00395°N 2.78879°W	—	c. 1800	A house with some 17th-century fabric, later incorporated into buildings of the University of Lancaster. It is in stone with a slate roof, it has two storeys and three bays. The windows are sashes. On the front is a pair of doorways; the left doorway has a plain surround, and the right doorway, now blocked and converted into a window, has a shaped inscribed lintel.	II
Stile; 53.99897°N 2.78541°W	—	c. 1800	The stile leads over the graveyard wall of a church that was demolished in 1936. It is in sandstone and consists of three steps on the north and south sides leading to a horizontal flagstone, and on the top of that is a vertical flagstone.	II
Sundial; 53.99900°N 2.78492°W	—	c. 1800	The sundial is in the graveyard of a church that was demolished in 1936. It is in sandstone and stands on a base of three square steps. The shaft is in the style of the 17th-century, it is square, and has chamfered sides. On the top is a brass plate with a broken gnomon.	II
Junction Bridge; 53.98409°N 2.79247°W		1823–25	A roving bridge carrying the towpath of the Lancaster Canal over the commencement of its Glasson Branch. It is in sandstone and consists of a single elliptical arch with chamfered voussoirs and a keystone. The bridge has a solid parapet, weathered coping, and piers at the ends.	II
Second Lock bridge 53.98225°N 2.79912°W		1823–25	This is an accommodation bridge over the Glasson Branch of the Lancaster Canal. It is in sandstone and consists of a single elliptical arch with a keystone, a solid parapet and piers at the ends.	II
Top Lock; 53.98401°N 2.79275°W		1823–25	The lock is on the Glasson Branch of the Lancaster Canal near its junction with the main canal. It is in sandstone and has two pairs of timber gates.	II
Second Lock; 53.98238°N 2.79867°W		1823–25	The lock is on the Glasson Branch of the Lancaster Canal. It is in sandstone and has two pairs of timber gates.	II
Boundary stone 54.00609°N 2.79316°W	—	Early 19th century (probable)	The stone marks the boundary with Thurnham parish. It is in sandstone and has a triangular plan, and there on inscriptions on both sides.	II
Bridge over River Wyre; 53.96589°N 2.73611°W		Early 19th century	The bridge carries the drive to Wyreside Hall over the River Wyre. It is in sandstone and consists of a single elliptical arch with rusticated voussoirs and a solid parapet. The bridge is flanked by piers containing round-headed niches.	II
Corless Mill Cottage, or Keeper's Cottage; 53.96833°N 2.73691°W	—	Early 19th century	A house in cottage orné style built in stone with a hipped slate roof. Both the roof and the walls are rounded at the comers. It has one storey with an attic, and is in two bays with an outshut on the right. The windows are horizontal-sliding sashes. On the east and west sides is a hipped dormer.	II
Galgate Old Bridge; 53.99212°N 2.78995°W		Early 19th century	The bridge carries Salford Road over the River Conder. It is in sandstone and consists of a single segmental arch with a solid parapet.	II
Lodge, Wyreside Hall; 53.96633°N 2.73899°W		Early 19th century	The lodge is in sandstone with a hipped slate roof and is in Neoclassical style. It has one storey and two bays, and a continuous entablature. On the south side is an Ionic portico with two columns and a moulded pediment, and Doric pilasters flanking the doorway. The windows are sashes.	II
1, 3 and 5 Wagon Road; 53.97505°N 2.73470°W	—	Early to mid 19th century	A row of three houses in Dolphinholme, in sandstone with a slate roof, and with chamfered quoins. The houses have two storeys, and each house is in two bays. The doors and windows have plain surrounds, the windows being sashes.	II
Ellel Hall; 53.99238°N 2.79513°W	—	Early to mid 19th century	A sandstone country house with a slate roof. It has two storeys with attics, and a symmetrical three-bay front. There are two timber dormers in the attics. The central doorway has attached Tuscan columns with fluted capitals, and a moulded pediment.	II
Ellel House; 53.99580°N 2.78626°W	—	Early to mid 19th century	This is a stuccoed stone house with a hipped slate roof. It has two storeys and a front of six bays. The windows are sashes, and in the fourth bay is a single-story canted bay window. The doorway in the second bay has a glazed porch.	II
Lane House; 53.98598°N 2.78931°W	—	Early to mid 19th century	A sandstone house with a slate roof, in two storeys with an attic. The symmetrical three-bay front has a central doorway that is flanked by attached Ionic columns and it has an entablature. The windows are sashes with plain surrounds.	II
Boundary stone 53.96625°N 2.77914°W	—	19th century	The stone marks the boundary of the parish with that of Forton, and stands on the west side of the A6 road. It is in sandstone, and has a triangular plan with a chamfered top. It is inscribed with the names of the parishes.	II
Galgate Silk Mills; 53.99521°N 2.78699°W		1852	The former silk mill has later been used as a warehouse. It is in brick with a slate roof, with three storeys and nine bays. The windows have stone lintels and small panes. To the north of the main block is a two-storey range, and between these is a boiler house with a tapering square brick chimney.	II
Ellel Grange; 53.97736°N 2.79301°W		1857–59	A country house by John Weightman in Italianate style. It is in sandstone with slate roofs, and has two storeys and two towers. The larger tower is on the entrance front and is in three storeys; it contains a doorway flanked by pairs of rusticated Tuscan columns. The main part of the house is balustraded. The other tower, at the rear, is slimmer and higher, and is attached to the main house by an arcaded link.	II
Redwards; 53.97768°N 2.79271°W	—	1857–59	This originated as part of the service accommodation for Ellel Grange, and has since been used as an old persons' home. It is in sandstone with a hipped slate roof, in two storeys and three bays. The windows are sashes, and have architraves.	II
Ellel Grange Home Farm; 53.97877°N 2.79607°W		1857–62	The farmhouse and farm buildings are in red and buff sandstone with roofs of blue slate, stone slate and clay tile. The farm consists of buildings and a wall enclosing a garden to the northeast. The buildings include the farmhouse, stables, a coach house and coachman's cottage, other farm buildings, and associated walls, a yard and gates.	II
Kings Lee Chapel; 53.97578°N 2.79178°W		1873	Also known as St Mary's Church, it was the estate church for Ellel Grange, and is now unused. The church was designed by W. & G. Audsley in High Victorian Gothic style. It is in sandstone, and has a steep slate roof. The church consists of a nave, a chancel with a round apse, a north porch with a tower, and a south organ chamber. The porch tower has a square plan, it is buttressed, and broaches to an octagon. The tower contains lancet bell openings, a stone spire with two pierced bands of red sandstone, and a small stair turret.	II*
Preston family Mausoleum; 53.97556°N 2.79181°W		1873	The mausoleum is in the churchyard of the former Church of St Mary. It was designed by W. & G. Audsley for the Preston family of nearby Ellel Grange. The mausoleum is in sandstone with a slate roof. In the east gable wall is a moulded doorway with a pointed arch containing a carving of the Resurrection in the tympanum. The four-light west window contains Geometrical tracery. Inside, there are blank arcades with pointed arches and columns with foliated capitals, some of which contain memorial tablets.	II
St Mark's Church; 53.97397°N 2.73786°W		1897–99	The church is in Dolphinholme, and was designed by Austin and Paley. It is in sandstone with a green slate roof. The church consists of a nave, a north aisle, a north porch, and a chancel. There is a tower at the crossing, a north transept, and a lean-to extension on the south side. The tower has a plain parapet, an embattled stair turret, and a short pyramidal roof.	II
St John's Church; 53.99614°N 2.78563°W		1906–07	The church, by Austin and Paley, is in sandstone with a red tiled roof. It consists of a nave with a north clerestory, a north aisle, a tower at the crossing with a stair turret, a north transept and vestry, and a chancel. The east window contains a fusion of Decorated and Perpendicular tracery.	II
Parish of Ellel War Memorial; 53.99617°N 2.78587°W	—	1921	The war memorial is in the churchyard of St John's Church, it is in grey sandstone, and consists of an ornate Gothic wheelhead cross. The three upper arms of the cross have pyramidal finials, the lowest arm has an octagonal foot, and in the centre of the cross is a Lancashire rose. The cross has a square shaft, a slightly tapering plinth, and a three-stepped base. On the front of the plinth is an inscription, and on the back are the names of those lost in the First World War. The names of those lost in the Second World War are on three sides of the top step of the base.	II
