= St Luke's Church, Torver =

Coordinates: 54.3382°N 3.1022°W

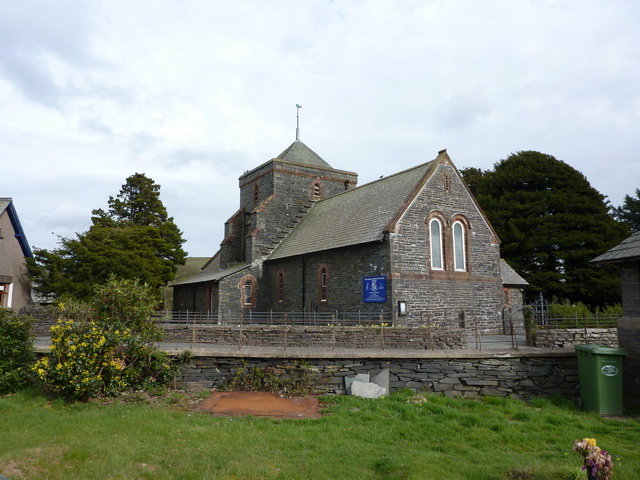
- St Luke's Church, Torver

- Location in Cumbria
- OS grid reference: SD 285 943
- Location: Torver, Cumbria
- Country: England
- Denomination: Anglican
- Website: St Luke, Torver

History
- Status: Parish church
- Dedication: Saint Luke

Architecture
- Functional status: Active
- Heritage designation: Grade II
- Designated: 25 March 1970
- Architect: Paley and Austin
- Architectural type: Church
- Style: Norman Revival
- Completed: 1884

Specifications
- Materials: Slate with sandstone dressings Slate roof

Administration
- Province: York
- Diocese: Carlisle
- Archdeaconry: Westmorland and Furness
- Deanery: Furness
- Parish: Torver

Clergy
- Vicar: Revd Brian Streeter

St Luke's Church is in the village of Torver, Cumbria, England. It is an active Anglican parish church in the deanery of Furness, the archdeaconry of Westmorland and Furness, and the diocese of Carlisle. The church is recorded in the National Heritage List for England as a designated Grade II listed building.

== History ==
The original church was built in 1849, and designed by Miles Thompson of Kendal. It was rebuilt in 1884 to a design by the Lancaster partnership of Paley and Austin. It provided seating for 150 people, and cost £1,350 (equivalent to £145,000 in 2025).

== Architecture ==
St Luke's is described by the architectural historians Hyde and Pevsner as being "chunky" and "robust". It is constructed in dressed slate with sandstone dressings and slate roofs. Its plan consists of a three-bay nave and a chancel, with a tower between them. On the north side is a vestry, and on the south side is a porch. The windows and the entrance are round-headed, the entrance arch being decorated with zigzags (a motif typical of Norman architecture). At the west end are a pair of windows, and at the east end are three windows, the central one being wider than the others. The tower has buttresses on the north and south sides, louvred bell openings, a coped cornice, and a low pyramidal roof surmounted by a fish weathervane. Internally, the tower is supported by round arches. The church contains a plain octagonal font.

The two-manual organ was built by Young in 1899. The organ was restored by Roger Mallinson of Windermere in 2014/2015.

Pevsner wrote that "one would have to search far and search long in England to find village churches to vie with" this and two other Austin and Paley churches, Dolphinholme and Finsthwaite.

== See also ==
- Listed buildings in Torver
- List of ecclesiastical works by Paley and Austin
