= Hutton Rudby =

Village and civil parish in North Yorkshire, England

Coordinates: 54.450°N 1.279°W

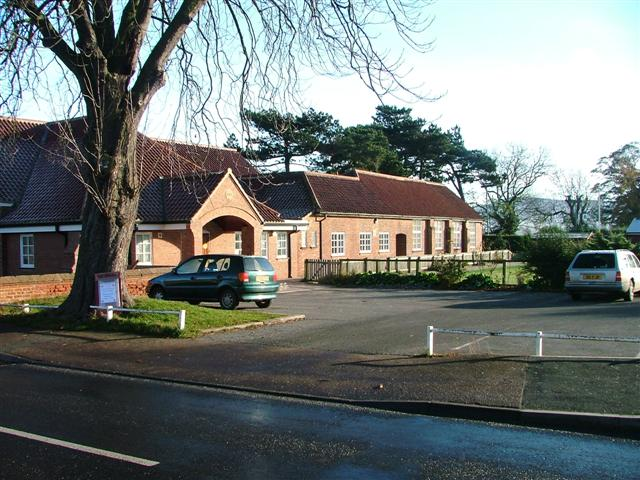
- Hutton Rudby village hall, renovated in 2004

- Location within North Yorkshire
- Population: 1,572 (2011 census)
- OS grid reference: NZ467065
- Civil parish: Hutton Rudby
- Unitary authority: North Yorkshire
- Ceremonial county: North Yorkshire
- Region: Yorkshire and the Humber
- Country: England
- Sovereign state: United Kingdom
- Post town: YARM
- Postcode district: TS15
- Dialling code: 01642
- Police: North Yorkshire
- Fire: North Yorkshire
- Ambulance: Yorkshire

Hutton Rudby is a village and civil parish situated 4 miles (6.4 km) west of the market town of Stokesley in North Yorkshire, England. At the 2011 census, the village's parish and built-up area subdivision had a population of 1,572 while its main population (including Rudby) had a population of 1,968.

From 1974 to 2023 it was part of the Hambleton District, it is now administered by the unitary North Yorkshire Council.

The name Hutton derives from the Old English hōhtūn meaning 'settlement on a hill spur'. Rudby was added due to the village's proximity to Rudby.

== Geography ==
It is situated close to the A19. It is joined to the village of Rudby by a bridge spanning the River Leven. It is near to the towns of Stokesley, Middlesbrough, Yarm and Northallerton. There are six village greens as there were a lot of livestock farmers that lived in and around the village.

The parishes of Hutton Rudby, Middleton on Leven, Rudby and Skutterskelfe, since 2016, combined are part of the Rudby neighbourhood planning area.

== Amenities ==
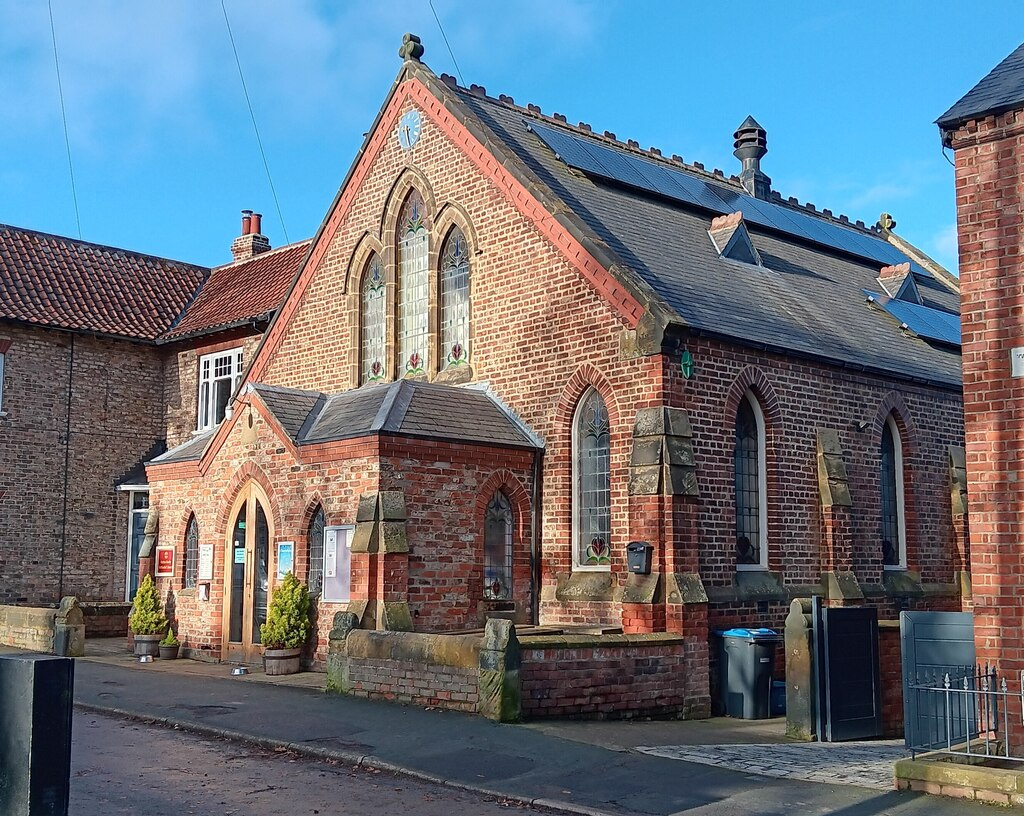
The old Methodist church

There are many amenities such as a doctors' surgery, two pubs, two hairdressers, a beauty salon, cricket club, bridge club, tennis club, bowls club, village hall, primary school, car mechanic, Methodist Church Community Hub and a SPAR shop and fuel station.

== Community and culture ==
A beacon was placed on the lower village green and first lit in 2012 to mark the Queen's Diamond Jubilee as part of the Burning the Beacons commemoration. It was again lit on the 100th anniversary of the Armistice in 2018. There is also a flagpole used to commemorate national events, an instance being the death of Prince Philip. Maypole dancing also takes place on the green.

== Notable residents ==
Paul Gascoigne and Fabrizio Ravanelli lived in Hutton Rudby when playing for Middlesbrough Football Club. Steve Agnew lived in the village when assistant first team coach for Newcastle United), as did Scottish football player Gordon McQueen.

== Landmarks ==
Rudby Hall is a Grade II* listed house, built in 1838 for Lady Amelia Cary, illegitimate daughter of King William IV, and her husband Lucius Cary, 10th Viscount Falkland. In 2014 it was re-opened after restoration for use as a wedding venue.

The Norman church of All Saints stands alongside the River Leven at the bottom of Rudby Bank. Sir Rex Hunt, the Governor of the Falkland Islands at the time of the Falklands War in 1982, was buried in the churchyard in 2012. Hutton Rudby has a cholera mound, the grave of some 23 people who died in the cholera outbreak of 1832.

== See also ==
- Listed buildings in Hutton Rudby
