= Grizedale Bridge =

Bridge at Over Wyresdale, England

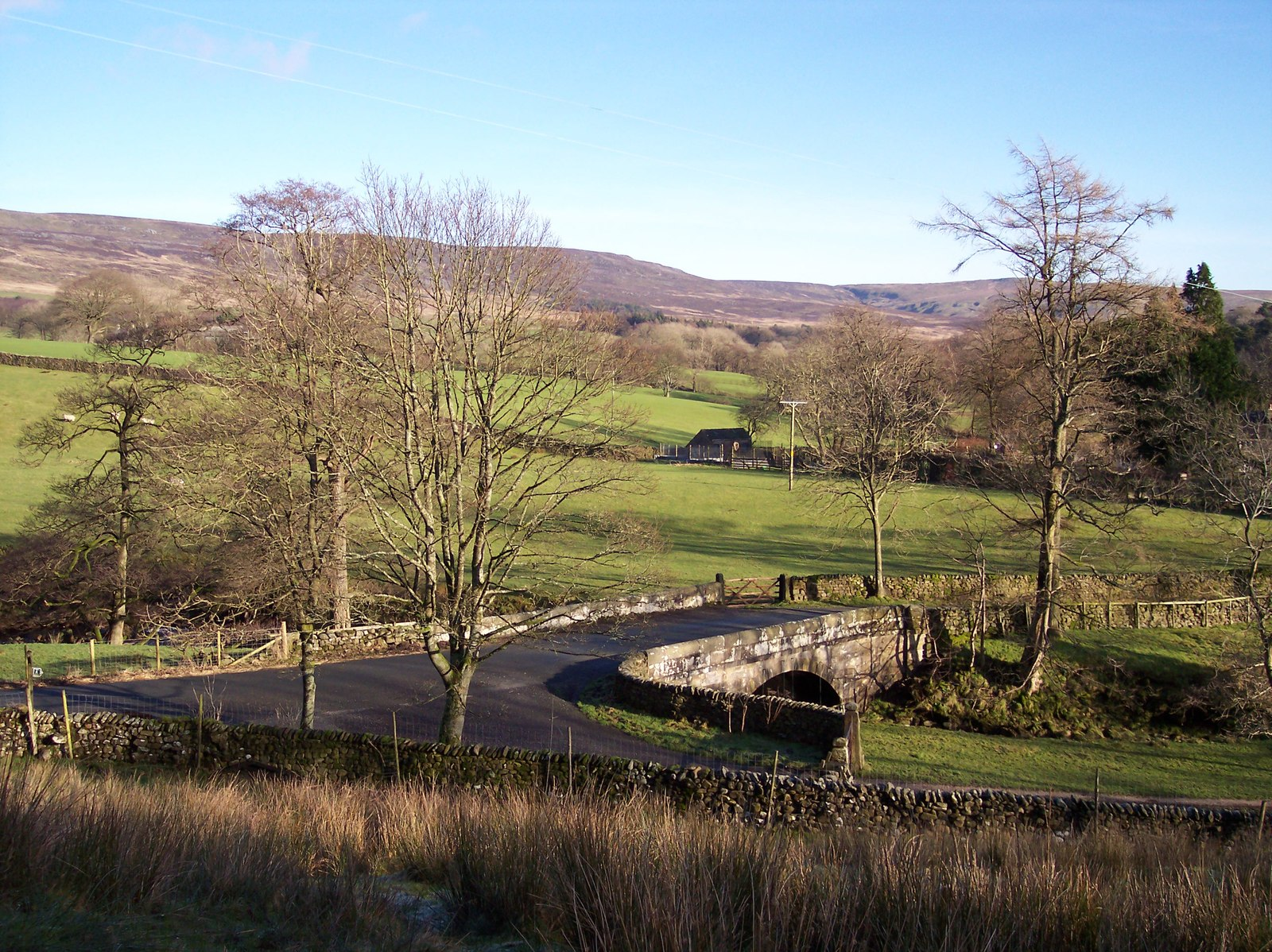
- The bridge in 2012
- Coordinates: 53.99182°N 2.66346°W
- Carries: Rakehouse Brow
- Crosses: River Grizedale

History
- Opened: 19th century

Statistics

Listed Building – Grade II
- Designated: 24 February 1986
- Reference no.: 1308862

Grizedale Bridge is a Grade II listed bridge in the English parish of Over Wyresdale, Lancashire. The structure, which dates to the 19th century, carries Rakehouse Brow (part of the road between the Trough of Bowland and Lancaster) over the River Grizedale. A Grade II listed structure, it is in sandstone and consists of a single elliptical arch and has a solid parapet with a rounded top.

== See also ==
- Listed buildings in Over Wyresdale
