= Wyresdale Abbey =

12th/13th century house

Coordinates: 53.981418°N 2.673540°W

Wyresdale Abbey was a short-lived medieval monastic house in Over Wyresdale, Lancashire, England. It was founded around 1170 or a little later and ceased to exist by 1204.

Cistercian monks from St Mary of Furness built the monastery near the end of the reign of Henry II. Its charter was granted between 1194 and 1198. The chaplain of St. Michael-on-the-Wyre was appointed chaplain of the monks for life.

The only remaining traces of the abbey are some carved stones reused in other buildings. The village of Abbeystead takes its name from Wyresdale Abbey and is situated just north of its former site.
