= Ellel, Lancashire =

Village in Lancashire, England

Coordinates: 53.998°N 2.785°W

Ellel
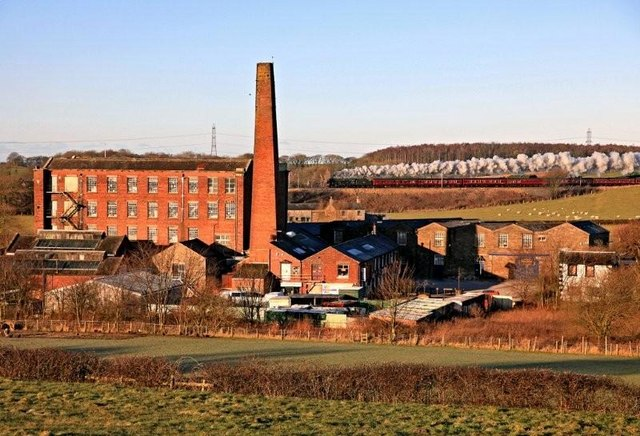
- The Cotton Mill Express passes the historic silk mill at Galgate

- Location in the City of Lancaster district Location within Lancashire
- Population: 4,644 (2021)
- OS grid reference: SD485560
- Civil parish: Ellel
- District: Lancaster
- Shire county: Lancashire
- Region: North West
- Country: England
- Sovereign state: United Kingdom
- Post town: LANCASTER
- Postcode district: LA2
- Dialling code: 01524
- Police: Lancashire
- Fire: Lancashire
- Ambulance: North West
- UK Parliament: Lancaster and Wyre

Ellel is a village and civil parish in the City of Lancaster in the English county of Lancashire. It had a population of 4,644 in 2021, 4,895 in 2011, up from 2,521 in 2001 The parish includes the villages of Bay Horse, Galgate and Hampson Green, and part of Dolphinholme.

The disused Church of St Mary was built on Ellel Grange estate in 1873 by W. & G. Audsley. The Anglican parish of Ellel is currently served by St John's Church which has stood in its present form since 1907.

Hay Carr on the outskirts of Ellel is a country house built by Thomas Lamb in 1750 and later owned by the Sandeman Port family.

== Governance ==
An electoral ward in the same name exists, currently represented by Sally Maddocks and Paul Tynan (both Green). This ward stretches to Abbeystead in the east with a total population taken at the 2011 Census of 6,854.

== See also ==
- Listed buildings in Ellel, Lancashire
