= Galgate =

Village in Lancashire, England

Coordinates: 53.993°N 2.784°W

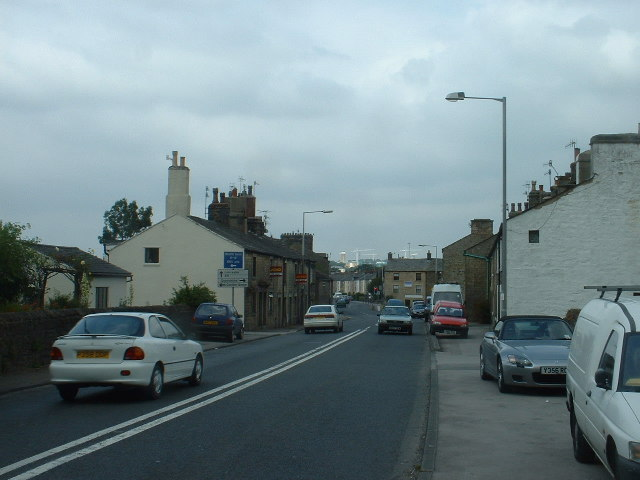
- A6 in Galgate, looking north

- Location in the City of Lancaster district Location within Lancashire
- OS grid reference: SD485555
- Civil parish: Ellel
- District: Lancaster
- Shire county: Lancashire
- Region: North West
- Country: England
- Sovereign state: United Kingdom
- Post town: LANCASTER
- Postcode district: LA2
- Dialling code: 01524
- Police: Lancashire
- Fire: Lancashire
- Ambulance: North West
- UK Parliament: Lancaster and Wyre

Galgate /ˈɡɒlɡət/ is a village in the City of Lancaster, just south of Lancaster University, and about 3 miles (4.8 km) south of Lancaster itself in the English county of Lancashire.

== Toponymy ==
The name Galgate is from Galwaithegate, a road that continues north through Cumbria, meaning the road to Galloway.

== Geography ==
The River Conder runs through the village.

== Transport ==
The A6 Preston to Lancaster road runs north–south through the centre of the village, and junction 33 of the M6 is nearby.

A major railway from Preston to Lancaster passes on a viaduct over the village. The village once had its own station (Galgate railway station) but it closed in 1939 and now the nearest station is Lancaster.

The village bus routes are run by Stagecoach in Lancaster.

The Lancaster Canal also runs through the village and has a marina for narrowboats.

== Industry ==
Galgate once had a thriving silk industry and many of the installations still stand. One story told is that because the rhubarb grown locally was used for dyeing the silk, Galgate's community newsletter is named 'Rhubarb City News'. Rhubarb is a prolific plant in Galgate, but this idea that it was used to dye silk seems to have no evidence to support it.

Galgate had a water powered corn mill, which was replaced by the 1792 stone three-storey wooden beamed mill of Thompson, Noble and Armstrong. It had a projecting stair tower and mill pond, with cast iron pillars inserted later. This mill is said to be the first mechanical silk mill constructed in England. The second three-storey mill was built in the early 1800s, made of stone with internal cast-iron pillars and a seven aisled roof. The third mill from 1851 is a five-storey brick built mill with corner pilasters and an internal beam engine house.

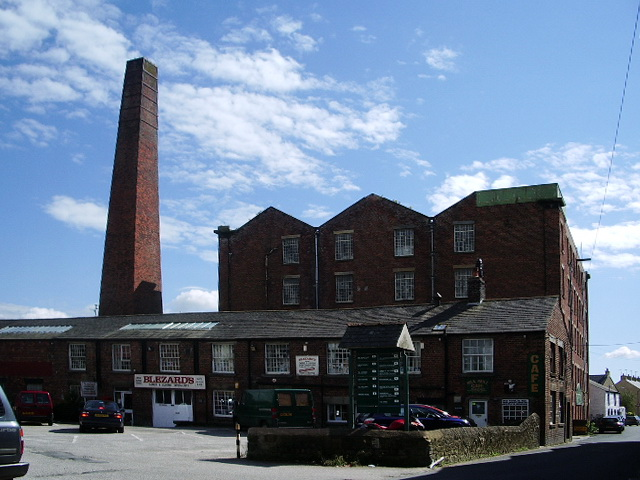
Built in 1851, this five-storey brick mill was the fourth on this site.

== Community ==
Due to its proximity to the Lancaster University campus, some students choose to rent houses in the village. There are at least two buses an hour towards Lancaster and Garstang.

Residents in Galgate worked to raise money to build a new village hall, between the football pitch and the cricket ground, on the recreation field behind the Plough Inn. This opened in August 2012.

Two churches serve the Galgate community. St. John's Church serves as the Anglican parish place of worship for Galgate and the wider Ellel parish. The village also has its own Methodist Church located on Chapel Lane.

The bi-monthly village newsletter, the Rhubarb City News, is put together by a team of volunteers and delivered to almost 1,000 households in Galgate.

Research for an investment company in 2011 claimed that Galgate was the third best place in England and Wales to bring up children.

== People ==
In July 2002 ten-year-old Jade Slack, who was visiting a friend in the village, died of a drug overdose. She took five ecstasy tablets, believing them to be sweets. Former Radio 4 Gardener's Question Time panellist Fred Downham was a long-term resident of the village. Alan Milburn, a former Labour minister, lived in the village whilst studying at Lancaster University.
