= Listed buildings in Skutterskelfe =

Skutterskelfe is a civil parish in the county of North Yorkshire, England. It contains four listed buildings that are recorded in the National Heritage List for England. Of these, one is listed at Grade II*, the middle of the three grades, and the others are at Grade II, the lowest grade. The most important building in the parish is Skutterskelfe Hall, which is listed, and all the other listed buildings are associated with it.

== Key ==
| Grade | Criteria |
|---|---|
| II* | Particularly important buildings of more than special interest |
| II | Buildings of national importance and special interest |

== Buildings ==
| Name and location | Photograph | Date | Notes | Grade |
|---|---|---|---|---|
| Skutterskelfe Hall and associated houses 54.45683°N 1.25549°W | | 1838 | A country house, it was designed by Anthony Salvin. It is also known as Rudby Hall, and has been converted for other uses. The house is built in sandstone with a Lakeland slate roof, and is in Classical style. There are two storeys and seven bays and a U-shaped plan. It has a plinth, quoins, a floor band, a sill band, an eaves cornice, and a parapet with balustraded panels and a top cornice. On the front is a projecting three-bay porch with Tuscan columns, an entablature, a dentilled cornice, and an open segmental pediment with a coat of arms. The doorway has a segmental-headed fanlight, an architrave and a keystone. The windows are sashes with architraves and keystones, those in the ground floor with moulded sills and panelled aprons. Recessed on the left is a lower two-storey wing. The houses are The Butler's Pantry, with one storey and two bays, and Rosedene and Briardene, with two low storeys and six regular bays. | II* |
| Walls, balustrade and gate piers 54.45678°N 1.25595°W | — | c. 1838 | The garden features to the south and west of the house are in sandstone. To the south of the house is a low wall on a plinth with slightly rounded moulded coping and a balustraded centre section. The garden wall to the west of the house contains a pair of rusticated gate piers flanking the drive. | II |
| North Lodge and gateway 54.45750°N 1.26204°W | — | c. 1900 | The lodge to Skutterskelfe Hall, later a private house, is in stone with a green slate roof. There is one storey and an attic, and two bays facing the road, It has a protruding porch with an iron balustrade, and a doorway in Ionic style with a fanlight. Most of the windows are sashes, and on the gable end is a Venetian window in an architrave with a keystone and a segmental hood on console brackets. The gateway has four rusticated piers, each with a plinth, a cornice and a blocking course. The gates are in wrought iron with lamp standards, and there are flanking quadrant walls with iron railings and two pairs of outer piers. | II |
| Pump house 54.45525°N 1.25729°W | — | Early 20th century | The pump house, which is in Japanese style, has one tall storey and four bays. There is a brick plinth with stone coping, and the upper parts are in timber framing, with infill in stone and pebbledashing. The hipped swept roof is felted, and has overhanging eaves on incised curved brackets. On the roof are two square vents with pyramidal roofs and ball finials. | II |
