= Quernmore Park =

Listed building in Lancashire, England

- Location within the City of Lancaster district

General information
- Type: Country house
- Location: Quernmore, Lancashire, England
- Coordinates: 54.0586°N 2.7401°W
- Year built: 1795–98
- Renovated: 1842

Technical details
- Material: Sandstone ashlar with hipped slate roof
- Floor count: 3

Design and construction
- Architect: Thomas Harrison (probable)

Renovating team
- Architect: Alexander Mills

Listed Building – Grade II*
- Official name: Quernmore Park
- Designated: 4 October 1967
- Reference no.: 1317735

Listed Building – Grade II
- Official name: Chain Lodge (or North Lodge)
- Designated: 4 October 1967
- Reference no.: 1164502

Listed Building – Grade II
- Official name: 6 gatepiers and railings north of Chain Lodge
- Designated: 4 October 1967
- Reference no.: 1071752

Quernmore Park Hall is a Grade II* listed Georgian country house which stands in a 20-acre (8.1 ha) estate in the village of Quernmore, part of the City of Lancaster district of England.

The house consists of a main 3-storey block with set back pavilions at each end. The main block is built of sandstone ashlar with five bays on three sides, a hipped slate roof and a central Ionic entrance portico. It has 15 bedrooms and four reception rooms.

== History ==
The Quernmore Park estate was sold by the Crown to Roger Downes of Wardley in 1630, passed c. 1675 to Sir Thomas Preston of Furness and then passed by marriage to Hugh Clifford, 2nd Baron Clifford of Chudleigh. It descended through the Clifford family until it was sold in 1794 to Charles Gibson of Preston. The present house was probably built by Thomas Harrison of Chester in 1795–1798, when the estate covered some 1,900 acres (770 ha), which Gibson completely reorganised, creating new farms and fields. He died in 1823, after which it transferred to his son, also Charles, High Sheriff of Lancashire in 1827, who died soon after him in 1832. Charles Gibson senior's wife continued to live at the house after the death of her son.

In around 1842, the house was acquired by William James Garnett (1818–1873), a prosperous cotton merchant of Lark Hill, Salford, conditional on the widow Gibson remaining in residence until her death, which occurred in 1843. He then commissioned Alexander Mills to remodel the frontage (adding the portico) and the interior entrance hall. He served as MP for Lancaster from 1857 to 1864. It then passed down to his son, also William Garnett (1852–1929), who was a Justice of the Peace (J.P.), Deputy-Lieutenant and appointed High Sheriff for 1879 and then in turn to his son, diplomat William James Garnett (1878–1965), who was High Sheriff for 1937 and 1941. On his death the property devolved to his younger brother Noel Trevor Garnett, an overseas civil servant, and then on the latter's death in 1961 to his son William Francis Garnett.

The estate was sold in 1990 by William Francis to the Oldroyd family. The estate was for sale in 2012, with the house itself in 20 acres (8.1 ha) of grounds, for £2.5 million. The Gardener's Cottage and Postern Gate Lodge were also on offer. In 2018 the estate was in the ownership of the businessman Owen Oyston.

== See also ==
- Grade II* listed buildings in Lancashire
- Listed buildings in Quernmore
