= St Mark's Church, Dolphinholme =

Coordinates: 53.9739°N 2.7377°W

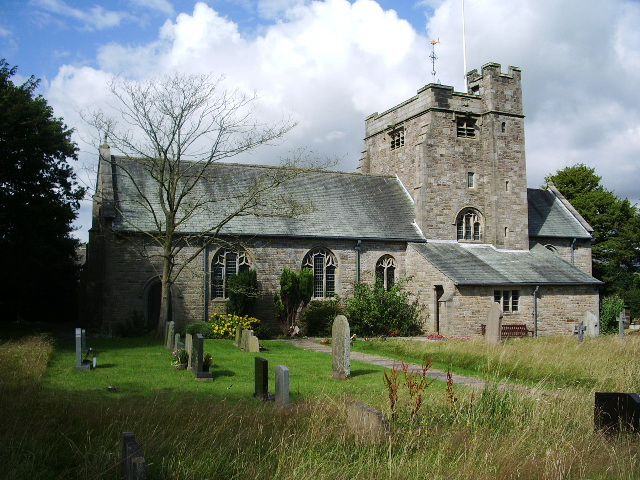
- St Mark's Church, Dolphinholme, from the south

- Location in the City of Lancaster district
- OS grid reference: SD 517,534
- Location: Dolphinholme, Lancashire
- Country: England
- Denomination: Anglican
- Website: St Mark, Dolphinholme

History
- Status: Parish church
- Dedication: Saint Mark
- Consecrated: 25 January 1899

Architecture
- Functional status: Active
- Heritage designation: Grade II
- Designated: 2 May 1968
- Architect: Austin and Paley
- Architectural type: Church
- Style: Gothic Revival
- Groundbreaking: 1897
- Completed: 1899
- Construction cost: £3,000

Specifications
- Materials: Sandstone, slate roofs

Administration
- Province: York
- Diocese: Blackburn
- Archdeaconry: Lancaster
- Deanery: Lancaster and Morecambe
- Parish: St Mark, Dolphinholme

Clergy
- Vicar: Revd Cindy J. Rigney

St Mark's Church is in the village of Dolphinholme, Lancashire, England. It is an active Anglican parish church in the deanery of Lancaster and Morecambe, the archdeaconry of Lancaster, and the diocese of Blackburn. Its benefice is united with those of Christ Church, Over Wyresdale, and St Peter, Quernmore. The church is recorded in the National Heritage List for England as a designated Grade II listed building.

== History ==
St Mark's was built between 1897 and 1898 to a design by the Lancaster architects Austin and Paley. The church was built to replace an older church erected some 60 years earlier for the use of local mill workers. The new church cost £3,300 (equivalent to £370,000 in 2025), and provided seating for 497 people. It was consecrated on 25 January 1899.

== Architecture ==
The church is constructed in sandstone rubble, with a green slate roof. Its plan consists of a three-bay nave, a north aisle, a north porch, and a chancel. At the crossing is a tower, with a north transept, and a lean-to extension to the south. At the southwest corner of the tower is a stair turret. There are buttresses on the east and west sides of the tower, and a three-light window on the south side. At the summit is a plain parapet, and a pyramidal roof with a weathervane. Along the wall of the aisle are four two-light windows. The porch contains a pointed doorway under a gable with a cross finial. The north and south sides of the chancel each contain a two-light window. The east window has five lights. Along the south wall of the nave are three windows, two with three lights, the other with two lights. To the west of these is a doorway with a pointed head.

Inside the church is a three-bay arcade carried on octagonal piers. The chancel contains a piscina with a trefoil head. The font has a cover dated 1910. The stained glass dates from the 20th century, and depicts Saint Mark and Saint Peter. The two-manual organ was built in 1927 by R. G. Phillips of Preston.

The architectural historian Nikolaus Pevsner wrote that "one would have to search far and search long in England to find village churches to vie with" this and two other Austin and Paley churches, Torver and Finsthwaite.

== External features ==
The churchyard contains the war graves of a soldier and an airman of World War II.

== See also ==
- Listed buildings in Ellel, Lancashire
- List of ecclesiastical works by Austin and Paley (1895–1914)
