= Galgate railway station =

Former railway in England

Galgate

General information
- Location: Galgate, City of Lancaster; England
- Coordinates: 53.9886°N 2.7890°W
- Grid reference: SD483550
- Platforms: 2

Other information
- Status: Disused

History
- Original company: Lancaster and Preston Junction Railway
- Pre-grouping: London and North Western Railway
- Post-grouping: London, Midland and Scottish Railway

Key dates
- 26 June 1840: Station opened
- 1 May 1939: Station closed
Location
- Location within the City of Lancaster district Location within Lancashire

Galgate railway station served the village of Galgate in Lancashire, England.

Preceding station	Disused railways	Following station
Lancaster (Greaves)	Lancaster and Preston Junction Railway	Bay Horse
Lancaster Castle	Lancaster and Carlisle Railway	Bay Horse
