= St Peter's Church, Quernmore =

Coordinates: 54.0366°N 2.7377°W

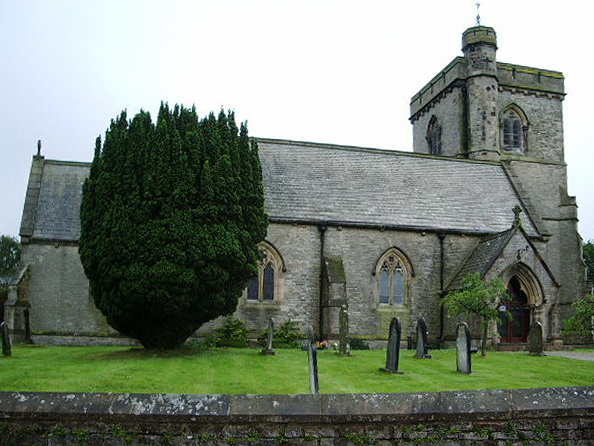
- St Peter's Church, Quernmore, from the north

- Location in the City of Lancaster district
- OS grid reference: SD 518,603
- Location: Quernmore, Lancashire
- Country: England
- Denomination: Anglican
- Website: St Peter, Quernmore

History
- Status: Parish church
- Founder: William Garnett
- Dedication: Saint Peter

Architecture
- Functional status: Active
- Heritage designation: Grade II
- Designated: 7 March 1985
- Architect: E. G. Paley
- Architectural type: Church
- Style: Gothic Revival
- Completed: 1860

Specifications
- Materials: Sandstone rubble, slate roof

Administration
- Province: York
- Diocese: Blackburn
- Archdeaconry: Lancaster
- Deanery: Lancaster and Morecambe
- Parish: St Mark, Dolphinholme

Clergy
- Vicar: Rev Cindy Rigney

St Peter's Church is in the village of Quernmore, Lancashire, England. It is an active Anglican parish church in the deanery of Lancaster and Morecambe, the archdeaconry of Lancaster, and the diocese of Blackburn. Its benefice is united with those of St Mark, Dolphinholme, and Christ Church, Over Wyresdale. The church is recorded in the National Heritage List for England as a designated Grade II listed building. It stands in a relatively isolated position about 1 mile (1.6 km) to the north of the village and 2.5 miles (4.0 km) to the east of the city of Lancaster.

== History ==
The church was built in 1860 to replace a chapel of 1834 that had been designed by W. Coulthard. The new church was designed by the Lancaster architect E. G. Paley. More land had been given to double the size of the site by W. G. Bradley. The church was paid for by William Garnett, the owner of nearby Quernmore Park Hall. It cost about £3,000 (equivalent to £320,000 in 2025), and provided seating for 320 people.

== Architecture ==
=== Exterior ===
St Peter's is constructed in sandstone rubble and has a slate roof. Its plan consists of a three-bay nave, a north aisle, a north porch, a chancel, and a west tower. The architectural style is that of the 13th century. The tower is in three stages which are separated by moulded string courses. It is supported by diagonal buttresses, and at the northeast corner is an octagonal stair turret rising to a greater height than the tower. The bottom stage contains a two-light window, and in the middle stage are trefoil windows. The bell openings in the top stage have two lights. At the top of the tower is a corbel table above which is a solid parapet with lancet openings. Along the south wall are three two-light windows, and there are two similar windows on the north aisle wall. The east window has three lights, and at the east end of the aisle is a wheel window.

=== Interior ===
The interior of the church is lined with brick and the dressings are in sandstone. It is the first church designed by Paley with a bare brick interior. The three-bay north arcade is carried on quatrefoil piers whose capitals are decorated with foliage carving. The pulpit is in the style of the 16th century and is decorated with linenfold panelling. It was made by Bell and Coupland. The stained glass in the east window is by Powell, and that in the tower window is by F. Burrow. Elsewhere is stained glass by Shrigley and Hunt, and by E. Jewitt. In a chapel at the northeast of the church is a chapel with items designed by John Hayward in 1959, including two stained glass windows. These include a reredos, and stained glass, that in the north window depicting the Deposition, and in the east window the glass in the wheel window is decorated with a monogram and rays. The two-manual organ was built in 1961 by Henry Willis, and was modified in 1964 by the same builders.

== See also ==
- Listed buildings in Quernmore
- List of ecclesiastical works by E. G. Paley
