= Listed buildings in Hutton Rudby =

Hutton Rudby is a civil parish in the county of North Yorkshire, England. It contains 20 listed buildings that are recorded in the National Heritage List for England. All the listed buildings are designated at Grade II, the lowest of the three grades, which is applied to "buildings of national importance and special interest".

== Buildings ==
Name and location	Photograph	Date	Notes
The Bay Horse Inn; 54.45109°N 1.27548°W		17th century	A public house that has been extended, the main part in stone on a plinth, the extension to the right rendered, and it has a pantile roof. There are two storeys, the main part has four bays, and the extension has three. The windows are mixed, and include casements, and sashes, some horizontally sliding.
24 North End; 54.45152°N 1.28123°W	—	Late 17th century	The house is in sandstone, with brick dressings, a stepped and cogged eaves cornice, a pantile roof, and two storeys. On the right is a fixed-light window, to the left is a casement window under a gauged brick arch, and the upper floor contains a horizontally sliding sash window.
Gardenstone Farmhouse, granary and stable 54.43971°N 1.28138°W	—	c. 1700	The farmhouse, which was later extended, and the outbuildings form an L-shaped plan. The farmhouse is in stone with a Welsh slate roof. There are two storeys and three bays, and it contains a porch, a doorway with sidelights, and sash windows with keystones. At the rear is a doorway with stepped jambs, alternating rustications, and a triple keystone. The outbuildings are in red brick with pantile roofs, and have a nine-bay arcaded front.
29 North End; 54.45180°N 1.28071°W	—	Late 17th to early 18th century	The house is in sandstone, with red brick dressings, quoins, a stepped and cogged eaves cornice, and a high-pitched pantile roof. There are two storeys and two bays. It contains a fire window, and the other windows are casements with gauged brick arches.
Barn east of Manor House Farmhouse; 54.45156°N 1.30921°W	—	Early 18th century	The barn is in red brick with a stepped eaves cornice and a pantile roof with a stone trim. It contains a blocked doorway and a vesica window.
3 and 4 East Side; 54.45031°N 1.27585°W	—	18th century	A pair of houses in red brick on a stone plinth, with two storeys. No. 3, on the left, has three bays and a swept tile roof, hipped on the left. It has tile-corbelled eaves and a central gabled rendered porch. No. 4 has two bays and a pantile roof. The central doorway has a bracketed cornice hood and side lights. The other windows in both houses are sashes with flat gauged brick arches.
41 Enterpen; 54.44736°N 1.28028°W	—	18th century	A house in a terrace in red brick with a floor band, stepped eaves courses and a pantile roof. There are two storeys and two bays. In the left bay are two doorways, and the windows are mullioned casements, those in the ground floor with flat brick arches and keystones.
17 North Side; 54.45104°N 1.27735°W	—	18th century	The house is in whitewashed brick with sprocketed eaves and a steeply pitched pantile roof. There are two storeys and two bays. The doorway has pilasters, to its right is a square shopfront with a cornice, and the windows are casements, the window to the left of the doorway with a transom.
Enterpen Farmhouse and stable 54.44729°N 1.27956°W	—	18th century	The farmhouse and stable are in red brick with grey headers, and have a dentilled eaves, cornice, and a pantile roof with stone copings and kneelers. The house has two storeys and four bays. On the front is a doorway with a trompe l'oeil window above, and the other windows are casements with lintels and keystones. To the left is a recessed single-storey two-bay extension with sash windows, and to the right is a single-storey stable.
Manor House Farmhouse; 54.45151°N 1.30939°W	—	18th century	A farmhouse incorporating a cottage in brown and red brick. It has pantile roofs with a stone trim, gable copings and kneelers. There are two storeys and three bays. On the front are two doorways, one blocked, and sash windows in architraves.
Hutton Grange Farmhouse; 54.45151°N 1.30939°W		18th century	The farmhouse is in red brick, with stone quoins and bands, and a pantile roof with stone copings and kneelers. There are two storeys, three bays, and lower flanking two-storey single-bay wings. The windows have flat gauged brick arches, and the central window in the upper floor has a keystone.
Hutton House; 54.45011°N 1.27613°W	—	18th century	The house, later divided, consists of two blocks with a recessed tower to the north. The main blocks are in brick, and have two storeys and Welsh slate roofs. The south block has six bays, and sash windows with chamfered surrounds. The north block has three bays, quoins, a floor band, and sash windows with keystones. On the front is a stone porch with a scalloped parapet, and a doorway with sidelights under elliptical arches. The tower is pebbledashed, and has alternating-block quoins, a cornice, and an embattled parapet.
Linden Grange; 54.44408°N 1.28028°W		Mid 18th century	The house is in colourwashed roughcast, and has a pantile roof with a stone trim, coped gables and kneelers. There are two storeys and attics, a double depth plan, and four bays. In the centre are two full-height caned bays, to the left is a doorway with a cornice hood, and the windows are sashes in architraves.
Hutton Bridge; 54.45260°N 1.27407°W		1755	The bridge, which carries a road over the River Leven, is in sandstone. It consists of two segmental arches, with voussoirs and projecting keystones. The cutwaters rise to pedestrian refuges, it has bands and parapets, and the abutments splay out at the north end.
The Obus; 54.45092°N 1.27575°W	—	Late 18th century	The house is in stone, with quoins, sprocketed eaves, and a Welsh slate roof with stone gable copings. There are two storeys and three bays. The central doorway has a Roman Doric doorcase with paterae. It is flanked by canted bay windows, and in the upper floor are sash windows under stuccoed flat arches with keystones.
Ober Green Farmhouse and Cottage; 54.44245°N 1.29593°W	—	c. 1800	The house and cottage are in pebbledashed brick, and have a Welsh slate roof with stone copings and kneelers. There are two storeys, the house has three bays and the cottage has one. The doorway is flanked by small canted bay windows with lead hipped roofs, and the other windows are sashes, those in the upper floor in architraves.
22 North Side; 54.45101°N 1.27789°W	—	Late 18th to early 19th century	The house is in roughcast brick, with chamfered alternating quoins, a stepped and cogged eaves cornice, and a pantile roof with gable copings. In the centre is a doorway with pilasters, a fanlight and a cornice. It is flanked by casement windows, and in the upper floor are sashes.
8 North End; 54.45088°N 1.28119°W	—	Early 19th century	The house is in red brick with a pantile roof. There are two storeys and two bays. On the front is a doorway with a plain surround, and sash windows in architraves.
The Old School; 54.44867°N 1.27715°W	—	Mid 19th century	The school, later converted into houses, is in sandstone, and has a Welsh slate roof with a tile ridge and stone gable copings. There is one storey and attics, a front range of six bays, and rear wings. On the front are two doorways with Tudor arched fanlights, and the windows are casements, those in the outer bays with Tudor arched heads, and those elsewhere with flattened ogee lintels. In the attic are four flat-headed dormers with cornices. In the right return and at the rear are sash windows, and also in the rear is a mullioned and transomed window.
Telephone kiosk 54.45057°N 1.28031°W		1935	The K6 type telephone kiosk on The Green was designed by Giles Gilbert Scott. Constructed in cast iron with a square plan and a dome, it has three unperforated crowns in the top panels.
