= Listed buildings in Quernmore =

Quernmore is a civil parish in Lancaster, Lancashire, England. It contains 28 listed buildings that are recorded in the National Heritage List for England. Of these, one is listed at Grade I, the highest of the three grades, one is at Grade II*, the middle grade, and the others are at Grade II, the lowest grade. Apart from the small village of Quernmore, the parish is rural. Most of the listed buildings are houses, farmhouses, and associated structures. The most important house in the parish is Quernmore Park; this and associated buildings are listed. The other listed buildings include a church, a former school, an aqueduct, a former corn mill, and a former railway bridge.

== Key ==
Grade	Criteria
I	Buildings of exceptional interest, sometimes considered to be internationally important
II*	Particularly important buildings of more than special interest
II	Buildings of national importance and special interest

== Buildings ==
Name and location	Photograph	Date	Notes	Grade
Lower Browtop Farmhouse; 54.01529°N 2.73045°W	—	1673	A stone house with a slate roof, it has two storeys. The original part has two bays, there is a rear wing, and a 19th-century bay to the right. The windows vary; some are mullioned, some have lost their mullions, and others are sashes. The doorway has a moulded surround and an inscribed shaped lintel.	II
Blackwood End Farmhouse (southern Farm); 54.00859°N 2.74893°W	—	Late 17th century	The farmhouse was altered in 1727 and in the 19th century. It is in rendered stone with a slate roof, and has two storeys and an attic. The original part has two bays. Some of the windows are sashes, others are mullioned. The doorway has a moulded surround and an inscribed shaped lintel.	II
Workshop, Croskell's Farm; 54.07124°N 2.77217°W	—	Late 17th century	The building originated as a farmhouse, and has been later used for other purposes. It is in sandstone with a corrugated sheet roof, in two storeys and three bays. On the south side is an outshut. The building contains openings, some of which are blocked.	II
Far Lodge Farmhouse; 54.03165°N 2.73855°W	—	Late 17th century	The house is in pebbledashed stone with a slate roof. It has an L-shaped plan, with two storeys and an attic. The windows vary, some being modern, and one is mullioned. In the rear wing is a doorway with a moulded surround and an inscribed shaped lintel.	II
Hare Appletree Farmhouse; 54.01638°N 2.71849°W	—	1682	A sandstone house with a stone-slate roof, in two storeys. It is in a T-shaped plan, and has a later extension with a slate roof to the left. Some of the mullioned windows have been retained. In the extension is a modern porch with a re-set inscribed shaped lintel.	II
Old Hall Farmhouse; 54.06680°N 2.73800°W	—	1702	A stone house with a roof of stone-slate at the front and slate at the rear, in a T-shaped plan. The main range has 2 1/2 storeys, five bays, and contains sash windows. In the centre is a porch with a parapet, and the internal doorway has a moulded surround and an inscribed shaped lintel. The rear wing contains some mullioned windows.	II
Lower Hollinhead Farmhouse and barn 54.05040°N 2.71352°W	—	1714	The house and barn are in sandstone with a stone-slate roof. The house has two storeys and a symmetrical three-bay front. The mullioned windows and the central doorway have architraves, and above the doorway is a decorated inscribed plaque. The barn to the right has a wide entrance with a segmental head.	II
Heights Farmhouse; 54.05438°N 2.71789°W	—	1720	The farmhouse is in sandstone with a stone-slate roof, and is in two storeys. The original part has three bays, and contains mullioned windows. The doorway in the central bay is in a single-storey gabled wing, and has a moulded surround and an inscribed shaped lintel. On the left side is an additional projecting bay.	II
Fell End Farmhouse; 54.03235°N 2.71458°W	—	Early 18th century	The farmhouse contains 17th-century remains. It is in sandstone with a stone-slate roof, and consists of two blocks in an L-plan. There are two storeys with an attic. Many of the windows are mullioned, and there are two doorways with inscribed lintels.	II
Southeast barn, Fell End Farm; 54.03225°N 2.71432°W	—	Early 18th century (possible)	The barn is in sandstone with a stone-slate roof. It contains a wide entrance with long-and-short jambs, and a doorway with a chamfered surround and triangular head.	II
Dam Head; 54.01225°N 2.76428°W	—	1734	A stone house with a slate roof, in has two storeys. The original part has two bays, mullioned windows, and a modern porch between the bays. Above the porch is an oval plaque with a painted inscription. To the left is an additional bay with modern windows.	II
Hollinhead Farmhouse; 54.06003°N 2.70995°W	—	Early to mid 18th century	A sandstone house with a roof partly of slate and partly of stone-slate. It has two storeys with an attic, and a symmetrical three-bay front. The windows are mullioned, and the doorway has an architrave with pilaster strips, a pulvinated frieze, and a moulded segmental pediment.	II
Barnes End; 54.01480°N 2.74930°W	—	Mid 18th century	This is a stone house with a stone-slate roof in two storeys and two bays. The windows are mullioned and the doorway has a plain surround.	II
Milestone; 54.07518°N 2.74273°W	—	Mid 18th century (probable)	The milestone is in sandstone. It has a rectangular plan in the lower part and is semi-elliptical above. The stone is inscribed with '3'.	II
Northern barn, Fell End Farm; 54.03235°N 2.71434°W	—	Late 18th century (possible)	A sandstone barn with a stone-slate roof. It has a wide entrance with long-and-short jambs, and inside are reused crucks and a cheese press.	II
Southern barn, Fell End Farm; 54.03211°N 2.71429°W	—	Late 18th century (probable)	The barn is in sandstone with a stone-slate roof, and is built on a slope. It contains a wide entrance, a window, three shippon doors, two rows of ventilation slits, and an owl hole.	II
Lune Aqueduct; 54.06845°N 2.78934°W		1794–97	The aqueduct carries the Lancaster Canal over the River Lune. It was designed by John Rennie and is built in sandstone. It consists of five semicircular stone arches with a stone trough carried on piers with cutwaters. The piers rest on piles of Russian timber. The parapets are balustraded above each arch.	I
Quernmore Park; 54.05848°N 2.74008°W	—	1795–98	A country house by Thomas Harrison in Palladian style. It is in sandstone with a hipped slate roof. The building is symmetrical, with a central block of three storeys and five bays. It contains sash windows, and has an Ionic portico added in 1842. It is flanked by single-storey links of five bays to two-storey, single-bay pavilions with pedimented gables.	II*
Chain Lodge (or North Lodge); 54.07432°N 2.74570°W	—	c. 1800	The lodge is at the north entrance to Quernmore Park, and is in sandstone with a slate roof. There is a central part in two storeys, flanked by single-storey bays. The front facing the drive has two two-storey piers flanking a segmental arch below a pediment. Between the piers are two unfluted Greek Doric columns with an entablature.	II
Postern Gate Lodge; 54.05288°N 2.74342°W	—	c. 1800	The lodge is at the south entrance to Quernmore Park, and is in sandstone with a slate roof. It is symmetrical, with a two-storey one-bay central part, flanked by single-storey bays with hipped roofs.	II
Castle Mill; 54.04181°N 2.73443°W		1818	The former corn mill has been used later as a farm building. It is in sandstone and has a slate roof, in two and three storeys. It contains sash and mullioned windows. Projecting from it are wall housing a pitchback water wheel with wooden buckets. At the rear is a wide entrance, and a wing with a hipped roof and a ball finial containing a drying kiln.	II
Gate piers and railings, Chain Lodge; 54.07447°N 2.74552°W	—	Early 19th century	The six gate piers are at the entrance of the drive to Quernmore Park. They are square, in sandstone, and each has a frieze with a roundel, and a moulded cornice. Between the outer piers is a low curved wall surmounted by cast iron railings with finials.	II
Barn, Narr Lodge Farm; 54.02817°N 2.74164°W	—	Early 19th century	The barn includes a shippon and a horse engine house. It is in sandstone with a stone-slate roof. It contains various doorways and windows, some of which are blocked. Inside the building is the horse engine.	II
Clougha Cottage and barn 54.02474°N 2.73306°W	—	1827	A house and barn in sandstone with a slate roof. The house has two storeys, and the main part has two bays, The windows are sashes, and the central doorway has a cornice hood with an inscribed plaque above. There is another bay to the right and has a door with a plain surround. The barn has a wide entrance with a segmental head.	II
1, 2 and 3 Pilgrim's Rest; 54.06192°N 2.71982°W	—	1849	A group of estate cottage in sandstone with slate roofs in two storeys, consisting of a central block with two cross-wings. The windows are mullioned, the porch has a triangular head, and above it is an inscribed plaque.	II
Quernmore Old School; 54.03628°N 2.73722°W	—	1850	The former school incorporates some late 17th-century material. It is in sandstone with a slate roof, in one storey and two bays. On the north front is a gabled porch, flanked by windows with pointed heads, and an inscribed plaque. On the west gable is a ball finial. The rear wall contains mullioned windows.	II
St Peter's Church; 54.03659°N 2.73765°W		1860	The church was designed by E. G. Paley and is in sandstone with a slate roof. It consists of a nave, a north aisle, a north porch, a chancel, a west tower, and a higher octagonal stair turret. The tower is in three stages, and has diagonal buttresses and a solid parapet.	II
Western railway bridge, Crook of Lune; 54.07655°N 2.73498°W		c. 1880	The bridge was built for the Midland Railway, but is no longer in use. It consists of six segmental iron arches carried on rectangular sandstone piers and with sandstone abutments. The deck is supported by timber beams. In the spandrels of the arches are roundels, and the parapet is an iron lattice.	II
