= Abbeystead House =

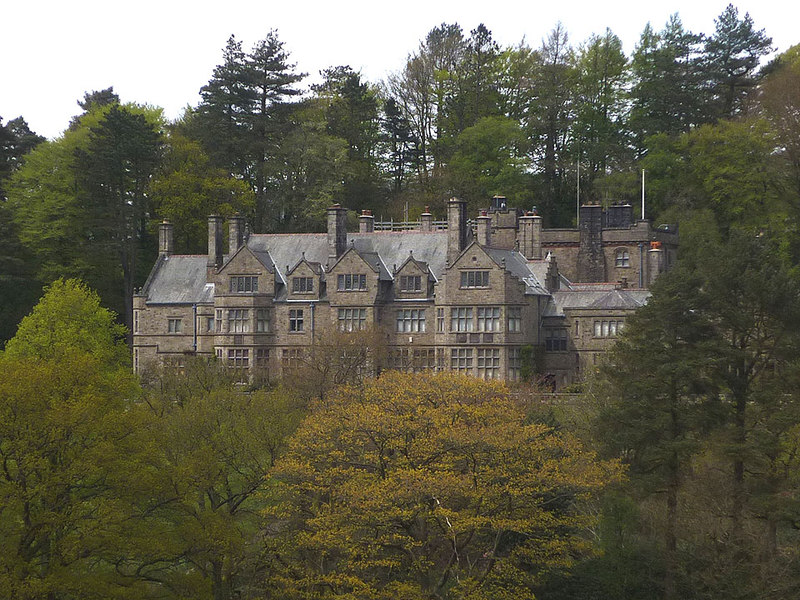
- Abbeystead House

- Location in the City of Lancaster district
- 53.9848°N 2.6615°W
- Location: Abbeystead, Lancashire, England
- OS grid reference: SD 567,545

History
- Built: 1886
- Built for: 4th Earl of Sefton

Site notes
- Architect: Douglas & Fordham
- Architectural style: Elizabethan

Listed Building – Grade II
- Designated: 24 February 1986
- Reference no.: 1071597

Abbeystead House is a large country house to the east of the village of Abbeystead, Lancashire, England, some 12 km (7 miles) south-east of Lancaster. It is recorded in the National Heritage List for England as a designated Grade II listed building.

== History ==
Abbeystead House was built in 1886 as a shooting lodge for the 4th Earl of Sefton. It was designed by the Chester firm of architects Douglas & Fordham, who added gun and billiard rooms in 1894. The estate holds the record for the biggest grouse bag in a day; when on 12 August 1915, 2,929 birds were shot by eight guns (shooters).

In 1980 the Abbeystead Estate, totalling 18,000 acres (73 km^{2}) and including the house, was bought by a trust relating to the family of the Duke of Westminster. Gerald Grosvenor, 6th Duke of Westminster, died suddenly at the house on 9 August 2016.

== Architecture ==
The house is built in sandstone rubble with slate roofs in Elizabethan style. Its plan is an L-shape, with south and east ranges partly enclosing a courtyard. The south range forms the main block while the east range is the service wing which incorporates a four-storey castellated tower. To the east of the main house subsidiary buildings form a second courtyard. The south range has two storeys plus attics and is entered by a porch on its north side. The façade of the north (entrance) front is irregular, and consists of five bays, three of which project forward and are surmounted by gables of different sizes with ball finials. The front also includes mullioned and transomed windows, a dormer, and a pair of round-headed arches in ground floor of the right bay. The outer doorway of the porch has a Tudor arch with the Molyneux arms carved above; it is flanked by small single-storey turrets.

The south (garden) front also has five bays, three of which project forward and two of these are canted. The front again contains mullioned and transomed windows and each bay has a gable with a ball finial. Tall brick chimneys rise from the roofs. Internally, the entrance hall has two fireplaces with panelled overmantels; one of the panels carries a carving of the Molyneux arms. At the back of the room is a timber arcade and the staircase has barley-sugar balusters.

Douglas' biographer, Hubbard, describes Abbeystead as the finest of Douglas' Elizabethan houses and one of the finest and largest he ever designed. Hubbard also suggested that Douglas' plan of a house with irregular gables and a tower grouped round a courtyard may have been inspired by nearby Lancashire medieval houses with pele towers, such as Borwick Hall. However, as Hartwell and Pevsner point out, Douglas also designed towers for his houses in Cheshire and Wales, so it may rather have been "rooted in his own style".

== Associated buildings ==
At the same time that Abbeystead House was being built, Douglas and Fordham designed two lodges for the estate. Lancaster Lodge stands at the head of the drive leading to the house. This has an L-shaped plan and is "quietly Elizabethan" in style. It is a Grade II listed building. York Lodge stands 0.5 miles (1 km) to the east on the road to Dunsop Bridge and is also listed Grade II. In 1891–92 the same architects designed stables and an adjoining pair of cottages for the house.

== See also ==
- Listed buildings in Over Wyresdale
- List of houses and associated buildings by John Douglas
