= Christ Church, Over Wyresdale =

Coordinates: 53.9839°N 2.6860°W

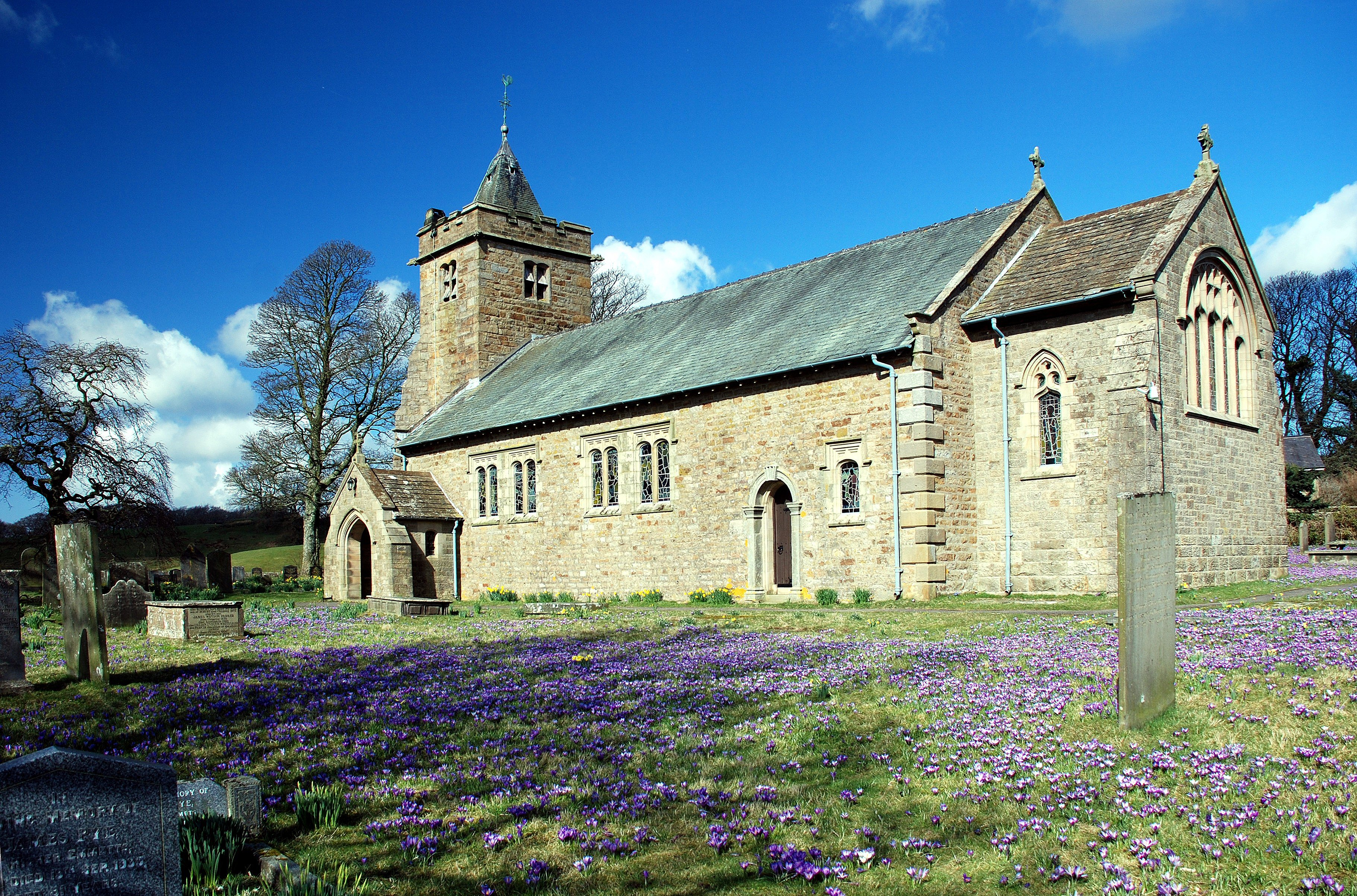
- Christ Church, Over Wyresdale, from the southeast

- Location in the City of Lancaster district
- OS grid reference: SD 551 544
- Location: Abbeystead, Lancashire
- Country: England
- Denomination: Anglican
- Website: Christ Church, Over Wyresdale

History
- Status: Parish church

Architecture
- Functional status: Active
- Heritage designation: Grade II
- Designated: 2 May 1968
- Architect: John Douglas (restoration)
- Architectural type: Church
- Style: Gothic
- Groundbreaking: 1733
- Completed: 1894

Specifications
- Materials: Sandstone rubble, slate roofs

Administration
- Province: York
- Diocese: Blackburn
- Archdeaconry: Lancaster
- Deanery: Lancaster and Morecambe
- Parish: Over Wyresdale

Clergy
- Vicar: Rev Cindy Rigney

Christ Church, Over Wyresdale, stands in an isolated position to the west of the village of Abbeystead, Lancashire, England. The church is recorded in the National Heritage List for England as a designated Grade II listed building. It is an active Anglican parish church in the diocese of Blackburn, the archdeaconry of Lancaster, and the deanery of Lancaster. Its benefice is combined with those of St Mark, Dolphinholme, and St Peter, Quernmore.

The church dates from 1733, replacing a chapel dating back to the 15th century, and it was restored in 1894 by the Chester architect John Douglas who added a spire to the tower, buttresses for the tower, a new south porch, a new vestry, and also built a new sanctuary. It is built in sandstone rubble with slate roofs and consists of a west tower, a nave with a chancel, a south porch, and a north vestry. The pulpit is dated 1684.

== See also ==
- Listed buildings in Over Wyresdale
- List of church restorations, amendments and furniture by John Douglas
