= The Bay Horse, Hutton Rudby =

Pub in Hutton Rudby, North Yorkshire, England

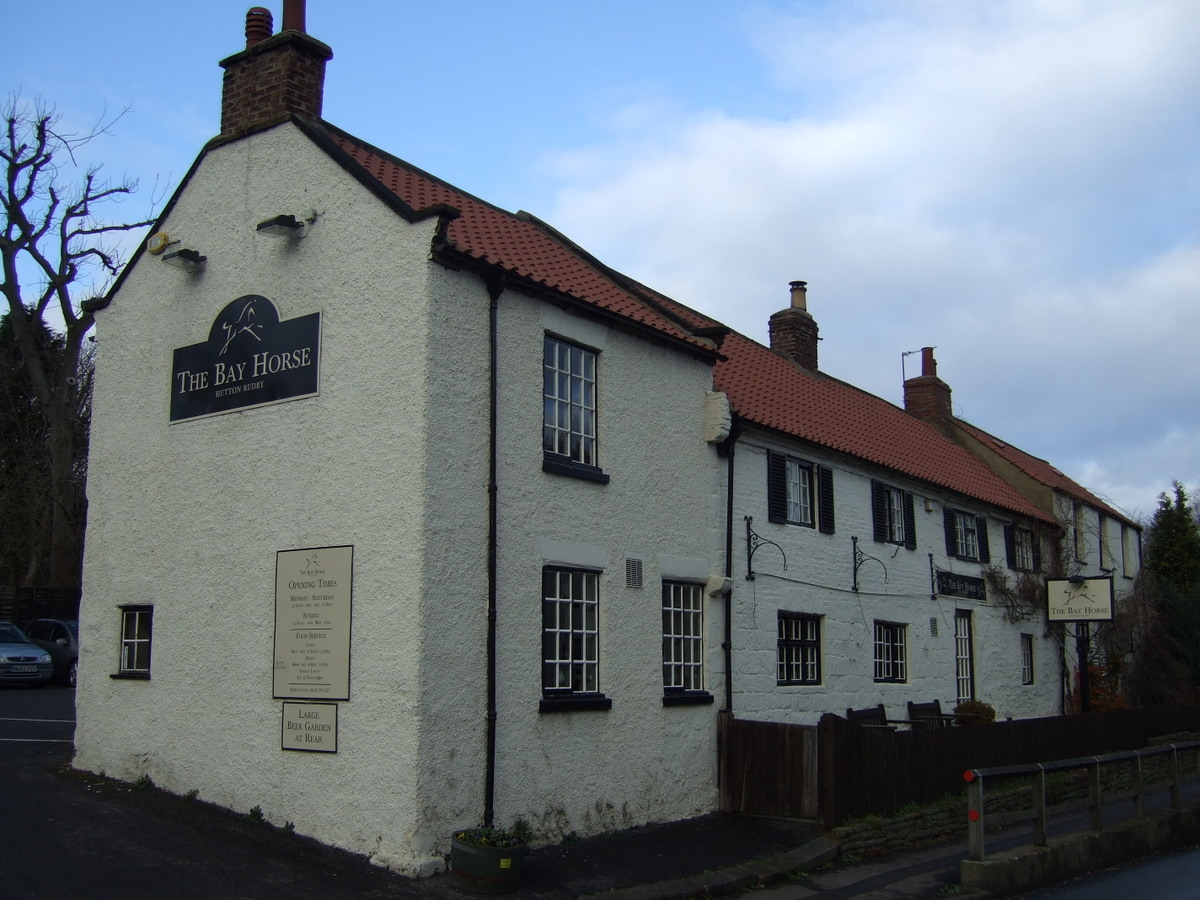
The pub, in 2012

The Bay Horse is a historic pub in Hutton Rudby, a village in North Yorkshire, in England.

The pub was constructed in the 17th century, and was extended in the 19th and 20th centuries. The building was grade II listed in 1966. In 2017, the pub won the Pub Food of the Year award at the Flavours of Herriot Awards, and Liam Gallagher visited it to try a parmo. In 2019, it was put up for sale, for £770,000. In 2023, the owners submitted plans for side and rear extensions, to link the pub with some of its outbuildings.

The main part of the building is constructed of stone on a plinth, while the extension to the right rendered, and it has a pantile roof. There are two storeys, the main part has four bays, and the extension has three. The windows are mixed, and include casements, and sashes, some horizontally-sliding.

== See also ==
- Listed buildings in Hutton Rudby
