= Listed buildings in Torver =

Torver is a civil parish in Westmorland and Furness, Cumbria, England. It contains ten listed buildings that are recorded in the National Heritage List for England. Of these, one is listed at Grade II*, the middle of the three grades, and the others are at Grade II, the lowest grade. The parish is in the Lake District National Park. It contains the village of Torver, and is otherwise rural. The listed buildings consist of farmhouses, farm buildings, a public house, and a church.

== Key ==
| Grade | Criteria |
|---|---|
| II* | Particularly important buildings of more than special interest |
| II | Buildings of national importance and special interest |

== Buildings ==
| Name and location | Photograph | Date | Notes | Grade |
|---|---|---|---|---|
| Building to west of Hoathwaite Farmhouse; 54.34488°N 3.08514°W | — | Early 17th century | Originally a house, later used as an outbuilding, it is in stone with a slate roof. There is one storey with an attic, and two wings at right angles, giving an L-shaped plan. In the east wing is a pitching hole, and inside are two upper cruck trusses. | II |
| Church House Public House; 54.33871°N 3.10200°W | | 17th century (probable) | The main range of the public house has one storey and nine bays. In front of the second and third bays is an outshut, and in front of the fourth bay is a gabled porch. At the rear is a two-storey four-bay wing and a two-bay gabled wing. Most of the windows are casements, and there are some sash windows. | II |
| Barn to north of Rose Hill; 54.32199°N 3.13169°W | — | 17th century (possible) | A field barn in stone with a slate roof and three bays. Inside are cruck trusses, possibly re-used. To the rear is a lean-to cow house with a corrugated iron roof. | II |
| Hoathwaite Farmhouse and outbuildings 54.34493°N 3.08486°W | — | Late 17th century | The farmhouse was later extended, and the outbuildings also date from later periods. They are in stone, the house is roughcast, and they have slate roofs. The house has two storeys, a main range of three bays, and a lower three-bay rear wing. On the front is an entrance with a gabled slate hood, and the windows are sashes. In the rear wing is another entrance with a gabled slate hood, most of the windows are casements, and there is also a mullioned window. The outbuildings consist of a small stable, a cow house, a barn, and a pig sty. Inside the house are two upper cruck trusses in each wing. | II* |
| Bank End Farmhouse and barn 54.32584°N 3.13119°W | — | Early 18th century | The farmhouse and barn are in stone, the house is roughcast, and they have slate roofs. The house has two storeys and three bays, and the windows are of varying types. To the left is an outhouse, attached to which is the barn with an outshut. The barn contains openings including an owl hole, and outside it is a mounting block. | II |
| House to northwest of Bank End Farmhouse; 54.32587°N 3.13137°W | — | Early 18th century | The house is in stone, partly roughcast, with a slate roof. There are two storeys and three bays. On the front is an open gabled porch, and the windows are sashes, one of them horizontally-sliding. | II |
| Barn to west of Bank End Farmhouse; 54.32578°N 3.13142°W | — | 18th or 19th century | The barn is on stone with a slate roof. It has three bays, a smaller outbuilding to the right, and a rear outshut. The building has doorways, a pitching hole, and ventilation holes. | II |
| Building to northwest of Bank End Farmhouse; 54.32573°N 3.13163°W | — | 18th or 19th century | A farm building in stone with a slate roof. It has three entrances, one partly blocked, and a window. | II |
| Stable and granary to southwest of Bank End Farmhouse; 54.32564°N 3.13133°W | — | 18th or 19th century | The granary is over the stable. They are in stone, partly roughcast, and have quoins. There are windows and doorway, one approached by stone steps. | II |
| St Luke's Church; 54.33904°N 3.10165°W | | 1884 | The church, which was designed by Paley and Austin, is in slate with sandstone dressings, and has slate roofs with coped gables. It consists of a nave with a south porch, a chancel with a north lean-to vestry, and a tower between the nave and the chancel. The tower has buttresses, a coped cornice, a pyramidal roof, and a weathervane in the form of a fish. The windows are round-headed. | II |
