= Skutterskelfe =

Civil parish in North Yorkshire, England

Coordinates: 54.4575°N 1.2525°W

- Civil parish
- Population: 129 (2011 census)
- OS grid reference: NZ485071
- Civil parish: Skutterskelfe
- Unitary authority: North Yorkshire
- Ceremonial county: North Yorkshire
- Region: Yorkshire and the Humber
- Country: England
- Sovereign state: United Kingdom
- Post town: YARM
- Postcode district: TS15
- Police: North Yorkshire
- Fire: North Yorkshire
- Ambulance: Yorkshire

Skutterskelfe is a civil parish in the county of North Yorkshire, England and lies to the north of the River Leven. The population of the parish at the 2011 census was 129.

The parish has a single Grade II* listed building, Rudby Hall, formerly called Leven Grove, and then Skutterskelfe Hall. The parish has three Grade II listed buildings, all connected to the hall – the pump house, the terrace walls and balustrade, garden wall and gate piers, and the north lodge to the park.

From 1974 to 2023 it was part of the Hambleton District. It is now administered by the unitary North Yorkshire Council.

== See also ==
- Listed buildings in Skutterskelfe
