= Over Wyresdale =

Coordinates: 53.983°N 2.667°W

- Civil parish
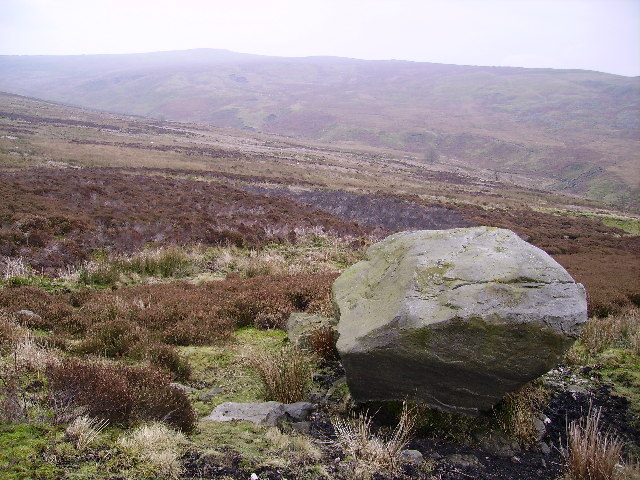
- Tarnbrook Fell

- Location in the City of Lancaster district Location within Lancashire
- Population: 316 (2011)
- OS grid reference: SD5654
- Civil parish: Over Wyresdale
- District: Lancaster
- Shire county: Lancashire
- Region: North West
- Country: England
- Sovereign state: United Kingdom
- Post town: LANCASTER
- Postcode district: LA2
- Dialling code: 01524
- Police: Lancashire
- Fire: Lancashire
- Ambulance: North West
- UK Parliament: Lancaster and Wyre

Over Wyresdale is a civil parish and a parish of the Church of England in the City of Lancaster in the English county of Lancashire. It has a population of 348, decreasing to 316 at the 2011 Census. The parish includes the hamlets of Abbeystead, Lee, Lower Green Bank, Ortner, Marshaw and Tarnbrook. The parish church, Christ Church is located about a mile to the west of Abbeystead.

The vast majority (around 16,000 acres (6,500 ha)) of the land in the parish lies within the Abbeystead Estate, which is the property of the Duke of Westminster, and which extends into neighbouring parishes to a total extent of approximately 23,000 acres (9,300 ha). Of the hamlets, only Lower Green Bank does not form a part of the Abbeystead Estate. The only other significant landowner is the Leigh family.

== See also ==
- Listed buildings in Over Wyresdale
