= Bay Horse railway station =

Rural station in Lancashire, England

Bay Horse
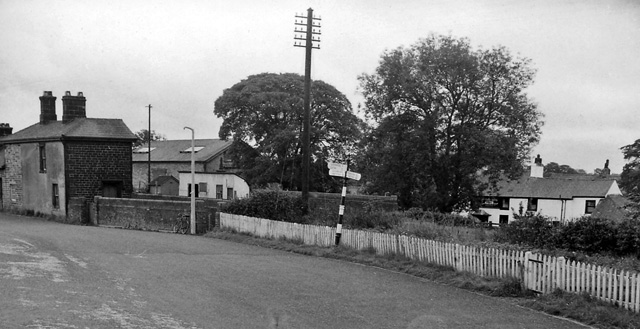
- Bay Horse railway station in 1962

General information
- Location: Bay Horse, City of Lancaster; England
- Coordinates: 53.9700°N 2.7748°W
- Grid reference: SD492529
- Platforms: 2

Other information
- Status: Disused

History
- Original company: Lancaster and Preston Junction Railway
- Pre-grouping: London and North Western Railway
- Post-grouping: London, Midland and Scottish Railway

Key dates
- 26 June 1840: Station opened
- 13 June 1960: Station closed
Location
- Location within the City of Lancaster district Location within Lancashire

Bay Horse railway station (also known as Bayhorse station) was a rural station in Lancashire, England. It was named after the nearby Bay Horse Inn, and later the small hamlet of Bay Horse developed around the station.

The station opened in 1840 on the Lancaster and Preston Junction Railway, by a level-crossing on Whams Lane. Many years later, the road was diverted 100 yards (100 m) north to pass under the railway by bridge.

In the 1840s, Jack Smith, an engine driver frustrated by having to wait every Sunday for the level crossing gate to be opened, carried out his threat to drive through the closed gate. The impact was sufficient to derail the small engine, although nobody was injured.

A much more serious accident occurred on 21 August 1848, when a northbound Euston to Glasgow express ploughed into the back of a local train stopped at the station. A woman was killed and about twenty passengers were injured. The woman's 18-month-old child was thrown out of the carriage window but was barely injured.

On 24 October 1861, a northbound mail train collided with a goods train at the station, but only a driver, fireman and one passenger were injured.

The station closed to passengers on 13 June 1960, and to goods on 18 May 1964; the last but one to close on the Preston to Lancaster section of the West Coast Main Line, though the line itself continues.

Preceding station	Disused railways	Following station
Galgate	Lancaster and Preston Junction Railway	Scorton
