= Dolphinholme =

Village in Lancashire, England

Coordinates: 53.975°N 2.738°W

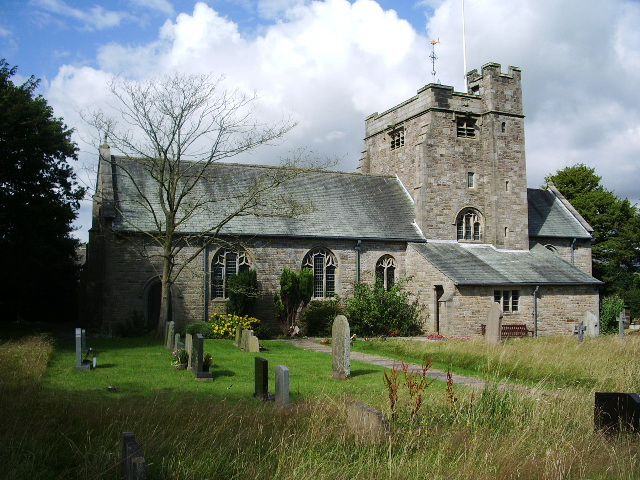
- St Mark's Church, Dolphinholme

- Shown within Wyre Borough Shown within the City of Lancaster district Location within Lancashire
- OS grid reference: SD518536
- Civil parish: Ellel; Nether Wyresdale
- District: Lancaster; Wyre
- Shire county: Lancashire
- Region: North West
- Country: England
- Sovereign state: United Kingdom
- Post town: LANCASTER
- Postcode district: LA2
- Dialling code: 01524
- Police: Lancashire
- Fire: Lancashire
- Ambulance: North West
- UK Parliament: Lancaster and Wyre

Dolphinholme is a historic village in Lancashire, North West England.

== History ==
Dolphinholme was first recorded as a place name in 1591. The name is thought to refer to its history as a Scandinavian settlement, with "Dolphin" referring to a common Scandinavian name at the time and "holme" meaning island or promontory.

In the 18th and 19th centuries the village played an important part in the Industrial Revolution. Thomas Hinde founded a mill in Lower Dolphinholme in 1795. This worsted mill prospered and in 1811 the lower village was amongst the first in the United Kingdom to have gas lighting. The Pollution was fed away from the village underground to the mill's chimney which was located in a nearby field.

== Geography ==
The village, designated as a historic conservation area, is split into two parts – a higher village and a lower part, called Lower Dolphinholme, situated on the River Wyre. The river is the boundary between the Lancaster and Wyre districts. Dolphinholme sits on the edge of the Forest of Bowland and is less than five miles away from Lancaster.

=== Transport links ===
It is 2 1/2 miles from Junction 33 of the M6 motorway. The nearest railway station is Lancaster.

There are no public transport links apart from two school buses which comes once a day and only during term time.

== Community ==
The village has a school (Dolphinholme Church of England Primary School), a village hall, a parish church (St Mark's C of E), a Methodist chapel, a pub (the Fleece Inn), a recreational ground, a tennis court and a bowling green. A Post Office visits the village hall on Tuesday and Thursday mornings from 10:00 am to midday.

Most of the historic lower village is still intact, the remains of the mill are in what is now a private garden but the chimney is still stands in a nearby field. A warehouse, associated with the mill has been converted into housing although it has been (somewhat confusingly) named 'The Mill'.

There is a village show that takes place on the second Saturday of September each year in the village hall. It features vegetables, flowers, cooking, photography and a children's section.

A village breakfast takes place in the chapel on the second Saturday or every month (except July and August) from 8:30 am to 10:30 am and is open to all without booking. The chapel also hosts a coffee morning every Tuesday from 10:00 am until midday which is also open to all without booking.

Jones Homes, an independent UK house builder owned by the Emerson Group, have completed the build of their Bowland Rise development in the village.

== See also ==
- St Mark's Church, Dolphinholme
