= River Grizedale =

River in Lancashire, England

Coordinates: 54.000°N 2.668°W

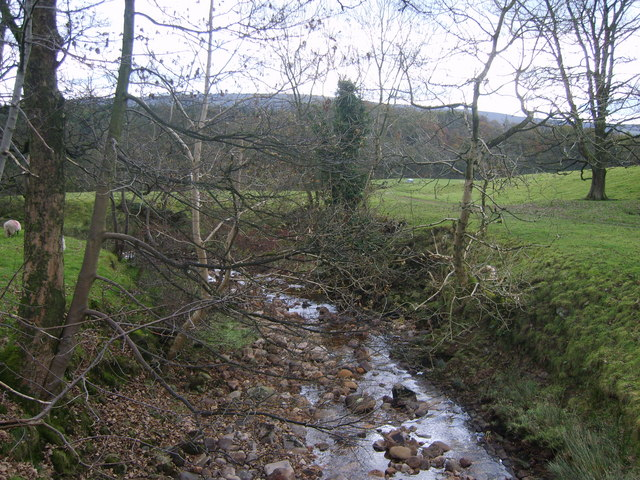
- River Grizedale near Lower Lee

Location
- Country: United Kingdom
- Part: England
- County: Lancashire

The River Grizedale, also known as Grizedale Beck, is a river in Lancashire, England.

The river rises at Grizedale Head between Abbeystead Fell, Cabin Flat and Dunkenshaw Fell and flows southwards, picking up several small streams on its way. Grizedale Beck is used as a nursery for juvenile salmon and trout. It flows through the Grizedale Reservoir, continuing southward and joining the river Wyre north east of Garstang.

== See also ==
- Grizedale Bridge
