= Rudby Hall =

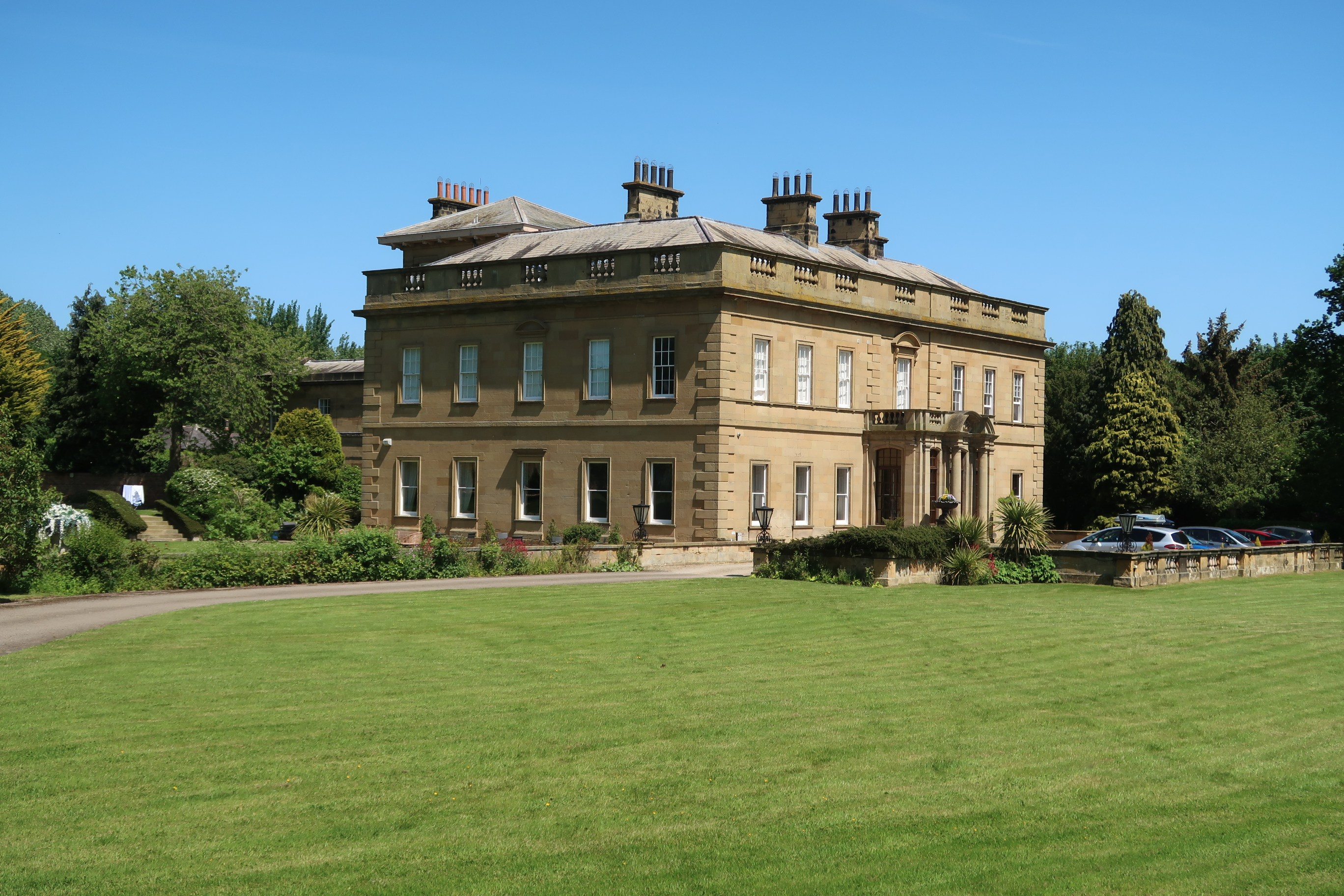
- The hall in 2023

- Location within North Yorkshire
- 54.4569°N 1.2554°W
- Type: House
- Location: Skutterskelfe, North Yorkshire

History
- Built: 1838

Site notes
- Architect: Anthony Salvin
- Architectural style: Neoclassical
- Governing body: Privately owned

Listed Building – Grade II*
- Official name: Skutterskelfe Hall, The Butler's Pantry, Rosedene & Briardene
- Designated: 23 June 1966
- Reference no.: 1150627

Listed Building – Grade II
- Official name: Terrace walls and balustrade, garden wall and gatepiers
- Designated: 8 May 1989
- Reference no.: 1189400

Listed Building – Grade II
- Official name: North Lodge and gateway
- Designated: 8 May 1989
- Reference no.: 1294276

Listed Building – Grade II
- Official name: Pump House to South-West of Skutterskelfe Hall
- Designated: 8 May 1989
- Reference no.: 1150628

Rudby Hall, Skutterskelfe, North Yorkshire is a 17,377 sq ft (1,614.4 m^{2}) country house dating from 1838. Its origins are older but the present building was built for the 10th Viscount Falkland and his wife by the architect Anthony Salvin. The house is Grade II* listed.

== History ==
Lucius Cary, Viscount Falkland inherited the Rudby estate from his aunt, Elizabeth Cary, Lady Amherst in 1830. At that time, the house was called Leven Grove. In the same year, Falkland married Lady Amelia FitzClarence, an illegitimate daughter of William IV and his long-time mistress Dorothea Jordan. On the King's death in 1837, Amelia, with her brothers and sisters, was among the main beneficiaries of her father's will. The Falklands had already commissioned Anthony Salvin to build a new house on the site of the older mansion. The total cost was £16,000. The Falkland family retained ownership of the estate until the end of the 19th century. By this time the house had been renamed Skutterskelfe Hall. (Note: The Historic England Listing refers to the building as Skutterskelfe Hall, The Butler's Pantry, Rosedene and Briardene, reflecting the name and the subdivision into offices and three houses which were extant at the time of the hall's listing.) It was used subsequently as a family home, a billet during World War II, and the headquarters of a chemicals company. Since the early 21st century it has reverted to use as a home and an events venue, and has seen a further change of name to Rudby Hall. Its first guest was reputedly the singer Liam Gallagher, who described it as a "top gaff [with] nice people". The Hall and its ancillary cottages were sold in 2020.

== Architecture and description ==
The architectural historian Jill Allibone considered the hall "a rather large, plain classical building", describing it as Salvin's first foray into the Italian villa style. The building is of two storeys and seven bays, and is constructed in sandstone ashlar. Pevsner notes the porch as a later addition. The hall is a Grade II* listed building. (Note: There are three categories of listed status for buildings in England and Wales: Grade I: buildings of exceptional interest.; Grade II*: particularly important buildings of more than special interest.; Grade II: buildings that are of special interest, warranting every effort to preserve them.) Its listing records the "lovingly restored high-quality Victorian decoration" of the interior.

Various subsidiary structures on the estate have their own Grade II listings; the pump house, the gate lodge, and walls, gate piers and a balustrade in the gardens.

== See also ==
- Grade II* listed buildings in North Yorkshire (district)
- Listed buildings in Skutterskelfe

== Sources ==
- Allibone, Jill (1988). Anthony Salvin: Pioneer of Gothic Revival Architecture. Cambridge: Lutterworth Press. ISBN 978-0-7188-2707-6. OCLC 1126398342.
- Pevsner, Nikolaus (1966). Yorkshire: The North Riding. The Buildings of England. Harmondsworth, Middlesex: Penguin Books. OCLC 1053637975.
- Wright, G.N. (1837). The Life and Reign of William the Fourth. London: Fisher, Son, & Co.
