= Quernmore =

Village in Lancashire, England

Coordinates: 54.025°N 2.734°W

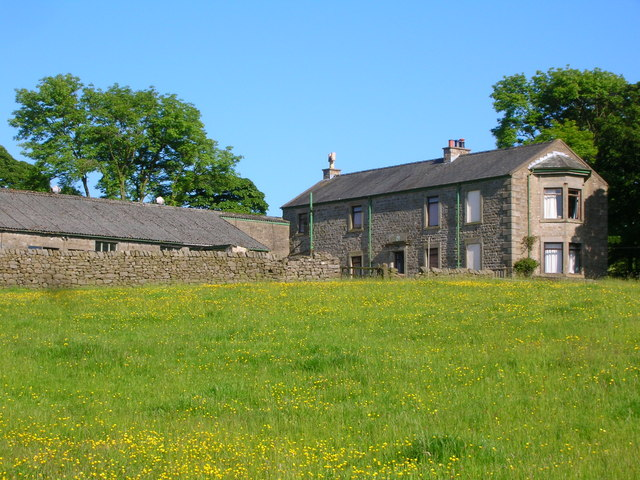
- Rowton Brook Farm

- Location in the City of Lancaster district Location in the Forest of Bowland Location within Lancashire
- Population: 567 (2011)
- OS grid reference: SD519590
- Civil parish: Quernmore
- District: Lancaster
- Shire county: Lancashire
- Region: North West
- Country: England
- Sovereign state: United Kingdom
- Post town: LANCASTER
- Postcode district: LA2
- Dialling code: 01524
- Police: Lancashire
- Fire: Lancashire
- Ambulance: North West
- UK Parliament: Morecambe and Lunesdale

Quernmore (pronounced /ˈkwɔːrmər/ KWOR-mər) is a village and civil parish in the City of Lancaster in Lancashire, England. It is located about 3 miles (5 km) east of Lancaster. The parish of Quernmore had a population of 532 recorded in the 2001 census, increasing to 567 at the 2011 Census. Apart from Quernmore itself, the parish also includes Brow Top, once a local crafts mecca, now barn conversions.

The village consists of a small number of residential properties, mostly farm houses, nestling in the bottom of the small valley of the River Conder. The valley has an ancient history. In 1970 a Roman pottery kiln was unearthed near the Friends Meeting House, and other kilns have been discovered in the local vicinity. In former times, the slopes of Clougha Pike which forms the eastern wall of the valley, were mined for millstone grit to form quern stones. There was some small scale coal mining and charcoal production. The valley also has two surviving watermills, one on the slopes towards Littledale and one at Conder Mill whose mill pond now is used as a fishery. Quernmore was at one stage a Royal Forest.

The Methodist chapel lies at the heart of the community but is smaller than St Peter's, the Church of England church which lies isolated next to Quernmore Primary School. There used to be one public house whose address is still the Temperance Hotel. The name used to be the Dog and Partridge (this name can still be seen on the electrical substation, 100 yards; metres to the south). It became the Temperance Hotel after the construction of the Thirlmere Aqueduct, completed 1894, as a consequence of the rowdiness of the navvies working on the aqueduct. The public house closed in 1900. The premises became the post office and village store until closure in 2008. The largest residential property is Quernmore Park, built in 1795 by the architect Thomas Harrison.

Quernmore lies within the Forest of Bowland Area of Outstanding Natural Beauty, although it is outside the historical area of the Lordship of Bowland.

The village was the first connected to the Broadband 4 Rural North high speed broadband network.

== See also ==
- Listed buildings in Quernmore
