= Torver =

Village and civil parish in Cumbria, England

Coordinates: 54.337°N 3.102°W

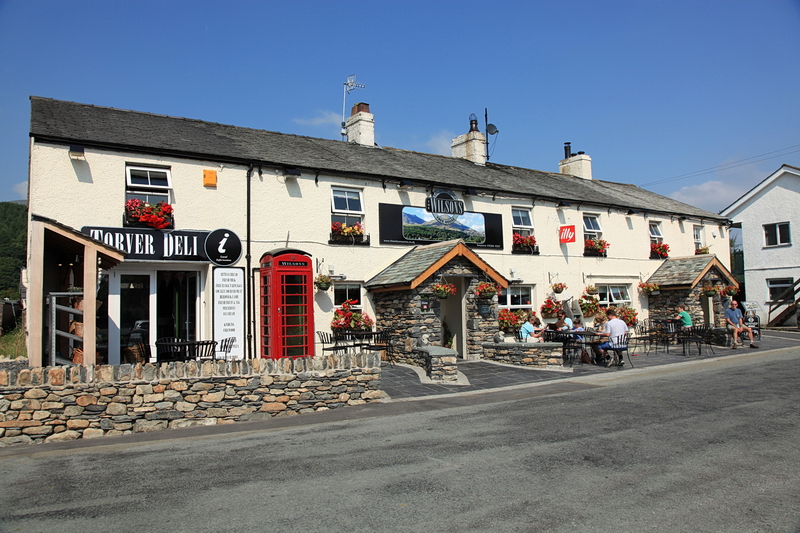
- Torver Deli and The Wilson Arms public house

- Location in South Lakeland Location within Cumbria
- OS grid reference: SD283941
- Civil parish: Torver
- Unitary authority: Westmorland and Furness
- Ceremonial county: Cumbria
- Region: North West
- Country: England
- Sovereign state: United Kingdom
- Post town: CONISTON
- Postcode district: LA21
- Dialling code: 015394
- Police: Cumbria
- Fire: Cumbria
- Ambulance: North West
- UK Parliament: Westmorland and Lonsdale

Torver is a village and civil parish in the Westmorland and Furness Unitary Authority of Cumbria, England, 3 miles (4.8 km) south west of the village of Coniston and 1 mile (1.6 km) west of Coniston Water.

Farming has always played an important part in Torver's history, though slate mining increased when the Coniston branch of the Furness Railway was opened in the 19th century (it subsequently closed in 1958). Nowadays, the hamlet remains a starting point for many walks around the Duddon Valley and Coniston Water, an area popularised by William Wordsworth.

== Governance ==
Torver is part of the Westmorland and Lonsdale parliamentary constituency, of which Tim Farron is the current MP representing the Liberal Democrats.

Before Brexit, it was in the North West England European Parliamentary Constituency.

Owing to the minimal population details are maintained under the parish of Blawith and Subberthwaite.

== See also ==
- Listed buildings in Torver
