= Bay Horse (hamlet) =

Hamlet in Lancashire, England

Coordinates: 53.970°N 2.774°W

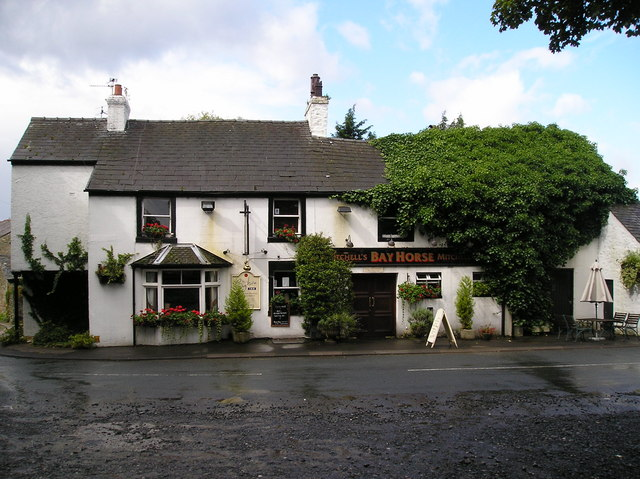
- The Bay Horse Inn

- Location in the City of Lancaster district Location within Lancashire
- OS grid reference: SD492530
- Civil parish: Ellel
- District: City of Lancaster
- Shire county: Lancashire
- Region: North West
- Country: England
- Sovereign state: United Kingdom
- Post town: LANCASTER
- Postcode district: LA2
- Dialling code: 01524
- Police: Lancashire
- Fire: Lancashire
- Ambulance: North West
- UK Parliament: Lancaster and Wyre

Bay Horse is a hamlet in the civil parish of Ellel, in the Lancaster district, in Lancashire, England. It lies between Lancaster and Preston to the north and south.

== Geography ==
To the west is the Irish Sea, and to the east is the Forest of Bowland, partly owned by the Royal Family.

== History ==
In August 1848, a north-bound London & North Western Railway train from London Euston to Glasgow collided with a small local train at Bay Horse station, killing 1, injuring 20.

Newland Hall is a country house and the former seat of the Owtrams, a local mill-owning family. Colonel Cary Owtram OBE (1900–1993) gained prominence after the publication of a secret diary that he kept during his three-and-a-half-year stint as a prisoner of war in Thailand during World War II.

== Community ==
The local area is mostly farmland, the nearest large urban area being Lancaster, approximately five miles away. Approximately 100 inhabitants reside in Bay Horse. The main road through Bay Horse is Whams Lane, which is used by motorcyclists on their way to Devils Bridge at Kirkby Lonsdale.

The Hamlet is served by the nearby St John's Church (CofE) in Ellel, which acts as its parish church.

== Travel ==
The Lancaster Canal bisects the village, and the M6 motorway runs through the village.

Bay Horse railway station closed due to low usage in the 1960s.

== Pub ==
There are no amenities in the hamlet, apart from a single pub, the Bay Horse Inn, after which the village is named. Even though the boundaries of Bay Horse are uncertain, there is a riding school on the outskirts called Bay Horse School.
