= St John's Church, Ellel =

Coordinates: 53.9961°N 2.7855°W

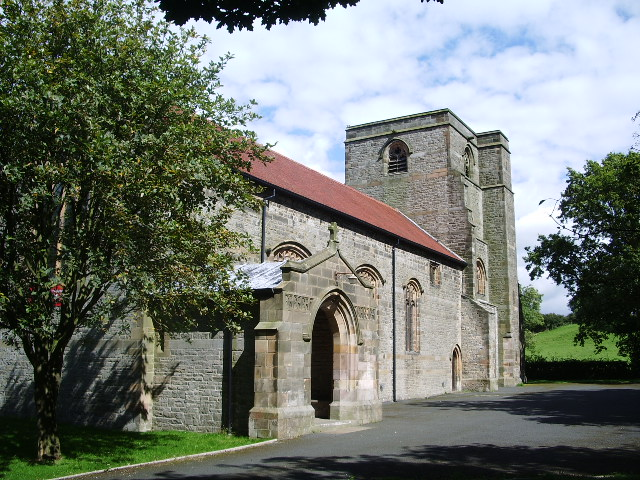
- St John's Church, Ellel, from the southwest

- Location in the City of Lancaster district
- OS grid reference: SD 486,558
- Location: Chapel Lane, Ellel, Lancashire
- Country: England
- Denomination: Anglican
- Churchmanship: Central
- Website: St John the Evangelist, Ellel

History
- Status: Parish church
- Dedication: Saint John The Evangelist

Architecture
- Functional status: Active
- Heritage designation: Grade II
- Designated: 2 May 1968
- Architect: Austin and Paley
- Architectural type: Church
- Style: Gothic Revival
- Groundbreaking: 1906
- Completed: 1907

Specifications
- Materials: Sandstone, tiled roof

Administration
- Province: York
- Diocese: Blackburn
- Archdeaconry: Lancaster
- Deanery: Lancaster and Morecambe
- Parish: St John the Evangelist, Ellel

Clergy
- Vicar: Rev. Craig Abbott

St John's Church is in Chapel Lane, Ellel, Lancashire, England. It is an active Anglican parish church in the deanery of Lancaster and Morecambe, the archdeaconry of Lancaster, and the diocese of Blackburn. The church is recorded in the National Heritage List for England as a designated Grade II listed building. The authors of the Buildings of England series describe the appearance of the church as being "decidedly monumental".

== History ==
St John's was a new church built in 1906–07 to replace a church of 1800 located on a different site. It was designed by the Lancaster architects Austin and Paley, and cost about £5,000 (equivalent to £520,000 in 2025), providing seating for 380 people. The original intention had been to build a spire on the tower but this never transpired.

== Architecture ==
=== Exterior ===
The church is constructed in sandstone rubble, and it has a roof of red tiles. Its plan consists of a nave with a clerestory on the north side only, a north aisle, a south porch, a tower at the crossing with a north transept and vestry, and a chancel. In the south wall of the nave are three windows of three and two lights under segmental heads containing Perpendicular tracery. To the west of the windows is a porch with a doorway under a pointed arch, and a gable surmounted by a cross finial. To the right of the three windows is a smaller two-light window at a higher level, and a doorway. The windows in the north wall of the aisle have two or three lights under flat heads, and the clerestory windows have two lights with elliptical heads under flat lintels. The tower has buttresses on the north and south sides, and a square stair turret on the south side. Also on the south side, in the middle stage, is a window with a pointed head. In the top stage the bell openings have two lights, and on the summit of the tower is a plain coping. In the south wall of the chancel is a two-light window with a segmental head. The east window has five lights. Its tracery is in a mixture of Perpendicular and Decorated styles.

=== Interior ===
Inside the church is a six-bay arcade carried on alternating round and octagonal piers. In the chancel is a piscina. The stained glass consists of a scheme by Shrigley and Hunt dating from the early 20th century. The two-manual pipe organ was made by Ainscough of Preston.

== External features ==
The churchyard contains the war grave of a Royal Garrison Artillery soldier of World War I.

== See also ==
- Listed buildings in Ellel, Lancashire
- List of ecclesiastical works by Austin and Paley (1895–1914)
