= Abbeystead =

Hamlet in Lancashire, England

Coordinates: 53.983°N 2.667°W

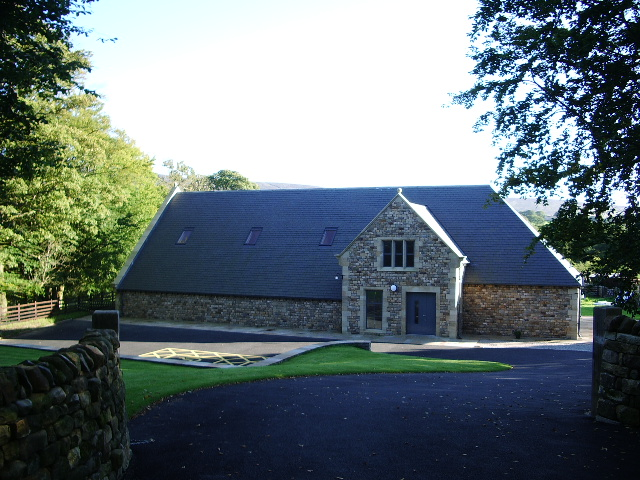
- Abbeystead Village Hall

- Location in the City of Lancaster district Location in the Forest of Bowland Location within Lancashire
- OS grid reference: SD562543
- Civil parish: Over Wyresdale
- District: Lancaster
- Shire county: Lancashire
- Region: North West
- Country: England
- Sovereign state: United Kingdom
- Post town: LANCASTER
- Postcode district: LA2
- Dialling code: 01524
- Police: Lancashire
- Fire: Lancashire
- Ambulance: North West
- UK Parliament: Lancaster and Wyre

Abbeystead is a small hamlet located in the Forest of Bowland National Landscape, in Lancashire, England. Abbeystead lies close to the Trough of Bowland but even in medieval times, was considered part of Wyresdale rather than within the domain of the Lord of Bowland, so-called Lord of the Fells. Abbeystead is located in the civil and ecclesiastical parish of Over Wyresdale.

== History ==
Little is known of the history of Abbeystead before the Norman Conquest, except that it was occupied from at least the middle of the prehistoric period.

== Name ==
The name is derived from "the site of the abbey" and relates to the short-lived presence of a house of Cistercian monks from Furness Abbey between c.1192 and 1204. One tradition sites the monks' house just below the junction of the Marshaw Wyre and the Tarnbrook Wyre, on the north side of the reservoir. Another places it around the site of the primary school.

== Structures ==
Notable buildings in the Abbeystead area include: Cawthorne's Endowed School, founded 1674, rebuilt on its original site in 1877; Home Farm opposite, dated at 1891; Abbeystead House, built in 1886 for the 4th Earl of Sefton, Stoops Bridge Cottage, built in 1674 to house the schoolmaster, rebuilt in 1841, and the attached schoolroom, which now houses the Abbeystead Estate Office, which housed the school from 1841 to 1877. Records trace the chapel to the west of Abbeystead back to the 14th century. The church was rebuilt in 1733, with a spire, buttresses to the tower, new windows, a vestry and new sanctuary added during restoration in 1894, at which time benches replaced pews and the west end musicians' gallery was removed.

The Abbeystead Reservoir was built in 1855 by Lancaster Corporation to supply mills lower down the River Wyre in the dry season. Although the reservoir is no longer in service it still features a curved overflow weir visible from the footpath. The reservoir marks the eastern terminus of the Wyre Way.

== Abbeystead disaster ==
On 23 May 1984, 44 people were attending a presentation at a newly built valve house at the outfall end of the Lune/Wyre Transfer Scheme in Abbeystead when an explosion occurred in the building. A total of 16 people were killed and 22 injured, some severely. The event had been organised to demonstrate how winter flooding in the lower Wyre Valley could be managed. An official inquiry into the disaster concluded that methane from coal deposits had built up in an empty pipe. It was released by the sudden pressure of water from the pumps as they were switched on. The cause of ignition has never been determined.
