= San Juan Cathedral =

Cathedral of San Juan or San Juan Cathedral, and variants thereof, may refer to:

== North and Central America ==
- Catedral Metropolitana Basílica de San Juan Bautista (San Juan, Puerto Rico)
- Episcopal Cathedral of St. John the Baptist (San Juan, Puerto Rico)
- San Juan de los Lagos Cathedral Basilica, Mexico
- San Juan Bautista Metropolitan Cathedral (Tulancingo), Mexico
- San Juan Bautista Cathedral (Ciudad Altamirano), Mexico
- San Juan Bautista Cathedral (Jinotega), Nicaragua
- San Juan Bautista Cathedral (Penonomé), Panama
- San Juan Bautista Cathedral (Trujillo), Honduras

== South America ==
- Anglican Cathedral of St. John the Baptist, Buenos Aires, Argentina
- San Juan Bautista Cathedral Basilica (Lima), Peru
- San Juan Bautista Cathedral Basilica (Salto), Uruguay
- San Juan Bautista Metropolitan Cathedral (San Juan de Cuyo), Argentina
- San Juan Bautista Cathedral (Calama), Chile
- San Juan Bautista Cathedral (Carora), Venezuela
- San Juan Bautista Cathedral (Chachapoyas), Peru
- San Juan Bautista Cathedral (Engativá), Colombia
- San Juan Bautista Cathedral (Iquitos), Peru
- San Juan Bosco Cathedral (Comodoro Rivadavia), Argentina
- San Juan Pablo II Cathedral (Ciudad Guayana), Venezuela

== Asia ==
- San Juan Evangelista Metropolitan Cathedral (Dagupan), Philippines
- San Juan Evangelista Metropolitan Cathedral (Naga), Philippines
- San Juan Bautista Cathedral (Kalibo), Philippines
- Old San Juan Evangelista Cathedral (Dagupan), Philippines

== Europe ==
- San Juan Bautista Metropolitan Cathedral (Badajoz), Spain
- San Juan Bautista Cathedral (Albacete), Spain

== See also ==
- St. John the Baptist Cathedral (disambiguation)
- St. John's Cathedral (disambiguation)
