= St. John the Baptist Cathedral =

This list is for St. John the Baptist Cathedrals. For St. John's Cathedrals, see St. John's Cathedral (disambiguation)

St. John the Baptist Cathedral, or variants thereof may refer to:

== Argentina ==
- Anglican Cathedral of St. John the Baptist, Buenos Aires
- San Juan de Cuyo Cathedral

== Australia ==
- St John the Baptist Cathedral, Murray Bridge

== Belize ==
- St. John's Cathedral (Belize City)

== Brazil ==
- St. John the Baptist Cathedral, Caratinga
- Metropolitan Cathedral of St. John the Baptist, Niterói
- St. John the Baptist Cathedral, Nova Friburgo
- St. John the Baptist Cathedral, Santa Cruz do Sul

== Canada ==
- St. John Cathedral (Edmonton), Alberta (Ukrainian Orthodox)
- Cathedral of St. John the Baptist (McLennan), Alberta (Roman Catholic)
- Basilica of St. John the Baptist, St. John's, Newfoundland (Roman Catholic)
- Cathedral of St. John the Baptist (St. John's), Newfoundland (Anglican)
- St. John the Baptist Cathedral (Nicolet), Quebec (Roman Catholic)

== Chile ==
- St. John the Baptist Cathedral, Calama

== Colombia ==
- St. John the Baptist Cathedral, Engativá

== El Salvador ==
- Chalatenango Cathedral

== France ==
- Aire Cathedral (Cathédrale Saint-Jean-Baptiste d'Aire)
- Alès Cathedral (Cathédrale Saint-Jean-Baptiste d'Alès)
- Bazas Cathedral (Cathédrale Saint-Jean-Baptiste de Bazas)
- Belley Cathedral (Cathédrale Saint-Jean-Baptiste de Belley)
- Calvi Cathedral (Pro-cathédrale Saint-Jean-Baptiste de Calvi)
- Lyon Cathedral (Cathédrale Saint-Jean-Baptiste de Lyon)
- Armenian Cathedral of St. John the Baptist, Paris
- Perpignan Cathedral (Cathédrale Saint-Jean-Baptiste de Perpignan)
- Saint-Jean-de-Maurienne Cathedral

== Germany ==
- Brunswick Cathedral (dedicated to Saints Blaise and John the Baptist)
- Basilica of St. John the Baptist, Berlin

== Greece ==
- St. John the Baptist Cathedral, Santorini

== Honduras ==
- St. John the Baptist Cathedral, Trujillo

== Ireland ==
- St. John's Cathedral, Cashel (Church of Ireland)
- St John's Cathedral (Limerick) (Roman Catholic)
- St John the Baptist Cathedral, Sligo (Church of Ireland)

== Italy ==
- Duomo of San Giovanni Battista, Loano
- Ragusa Cathedral
- Cathedral of Saint John the Baptist (Turin)

== Malta ==
- St John's Co-Cathedral, Valletta

== Mexico ==
- Ciudad Altamirano Cathedral
- Tulancingo Cathedral

== Panama ==
- St. John Baptist Cathedral, Penonomé

== Peru ==
- Chachapoyas Cathedral
- Iquitos Cathedral

== Philippines ==
- Kalibo Cathedral

== Poland ==
- St. John the Baptist Cathedral, Lublin (Roman Catholic)
- Cathedral of St. John the Baptist, Przemyśl (Greek Catholic)
- St. John's Archcathedral, Warsaw (Roman Catholic)
- Wrocław Cathedral, also called Cathedral of St. John the Baptist (Roman Catholic)

== Puerto Rico ==
- Cathedral of San Juan, Puerto Rico
- Episcopal Cathedral of St. John the Baptist (San Juan, Puerto Rico)

== Slovakia ==
- Cathedral of Saint John the Baptist, Prešov (Byzantine Catholic)
- St. John the Baptist Cathedral (Trnava) (Roman Catholic)

== Slovenia ==
- Maribor Cathedral

== Spain ==
- Albacete Cathedral
- Badajoz Cathedral

== Ukraine ==
- Synaxis of John the Baptist church, Yakymiv

== United Kingdom ==
- St John the Baptist Cathedral, Norwich (Roman Catholic)
- St John the Baptist's Church, Chester, also called the Cathedral Church of Saint John the Baptist (Anglican)

== United States ==
- Saint John the Baptist Cathedral (Fresno, California) (Roman Catholic)
- Cathedral of St. John in the Wilderness, Denver, Colorado (Episcopal)
- Cathedral of St. John the Baptist (Washington, D.C.) (Russian Orthodox)
- Cathedral of St. John the Baptist (Savannah, Georgia) (Roman Catholic)
- St. John's Parish (Quincy, Illinois), cathedral of the Diocese of Quincy (Anglican)
- Cathedral of St. John the Baptist (Parma, Ohio) (Byzantine Catholic)
- Cathedral of St. John the Baptist (Paterson, New Jersey)
- St. John the Baptist Byzantine Catholic Cathedral (Pittsburgh), Pennsylvania
- Cathedral of Saint John the Baptist (Charleston, South Carolina) (Roman Catholic)

== Uruguay ==
- Cathedral of Salto

== Venezuela ==
- St. John the Baptist Cathedral, Carora

== See also ==
- St. John the Baptist Church (disambiguation)
- St. John's Cathedral (disambiguation)–mainly dedicated to St. John the Evangelist
- San Juan Cathedral (disambiguation)
