= List of cathedrals in Honduras =

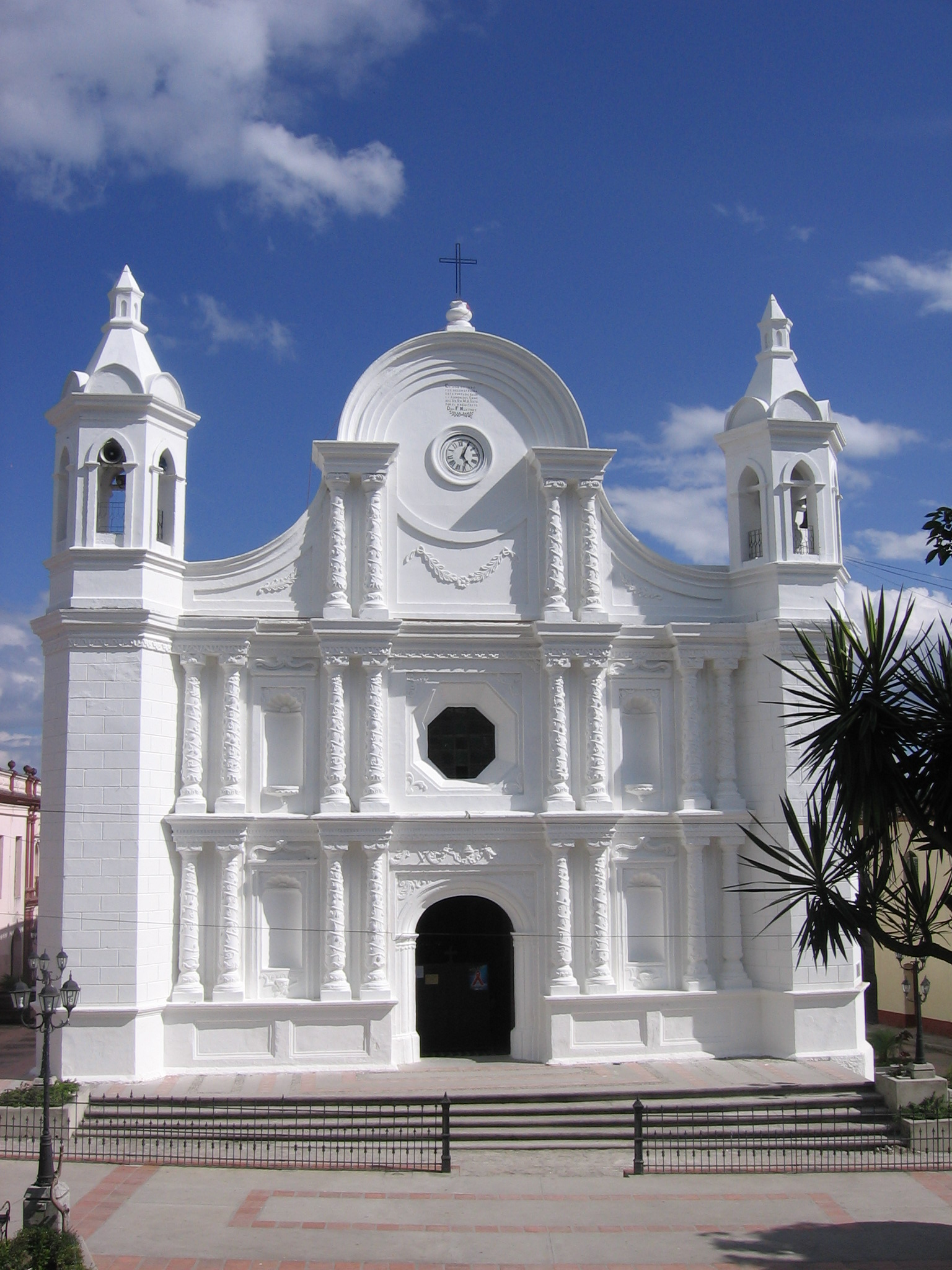
Catedral de Santa Rosa in Santa Rosa de Copán

This is the list of cathedrals in Honduras sorted by denomination.

== Catholic ==
Cathedrals of the Catholic Church in Honduras:

- Cathedral of the Immaculate Conception in Choluteca
- Cathedral of the Immaculate Conception in Comayagua
- Cathedral of the Immaculate Conception in Juticalpa
- Cathedral of St. Isidore the Worker in La Ceiba
- Cathedral of St. Peter the Apostle in San Pedro Sula
- Catedral de Santa Rosa in Santa Rosa de Copán
- Cathedral of St. Michael the Archangel in Tegucigalpa
- Cathedral of St. John the Baptist in Trujillo
- Catedral Las Mercedes in El Progreso

== Anglican ==
Cathedrals of the Province 9 of the Episcopal Church in the United States of America:

- Catedral El Buen Pastor San Pedro Sula in San Pedro Sula

== See also ==
- Lists of cathedrals
