= Parque Central =

Parque Central can refer to:

- Parque Central, Havana, Cuba
- Estadio Gran Parque Central, a soccer stadium in Montevideo, Uruguay
- Parque Central Complex, centered on twin 56-story towers in Caracas, Venezuela
  - Parque Central station, on the Caracas Metro
- Parque Central (Honduras), a public park near San Pedro Sula cathedral
