= Virgilio López Irias =

Honduran priest, bishop

Virgilio López Irias O.F.M. (born 29 Sep, 1937 in La Ceiba) was a Honduran clergyman and bishop for the Roman Catholic Diocese of Trujillo (Honduras). He became ordained in 1973. He was appointed bishop in 1987. He died in 2004.
