= Diocese of Trujillo (Honduras) =

Roman Catholic diocese in Honduras

Diocese of Trujillo in Honduras Dioecesis Truxillensis in Honduria

Location
- Country: Honduras
- Ecclesiastical province: Province of Tegucigalpa
- Metropolitan: Oscar Andrés Rodríguez Maradiaga, S.D.B.

Statistics
- Area: 25,500 km^{2} (9,800 sq mi)
- Population: Total; Catholics: (as of 2010); 327,000; 230,000 (73.3%)
- Parishes: 10

Information
- Denomination: Roman Catholic
- Rite: Roman Rite
- Established: 3 July 1987 (38 years ago)
- Cathedral: St. John the Baptist Cathedral

Current leadership
- Pope: Leo XIV
- Bishop: Luis Felipe Solé Fa, C.M.

Map

The Roman Catholic Diocese of Trujillo (erected 3 July 1987) is a suffragan of the Archdiocese of San Pedro Sula.

== History ==
The Diocese of Trujillo was founded as the Diocese of Honduras; in 1561, the Diocese of Comayagua was established on territory split off from the Diocese of Trujillo and in 1571 gained its mother bishopric's remaining territory at its suppression (Trujillo would however be restored in 1987).

== Ordinaries ==
- Virgilio López Irias, O.F.M. (1987–2004)
- Luis Felipe Solé Fa, C.M. (2005–2013)
- Jenry Orlando Ruiz Mora (2013-)

== See also ==
- Roman Catholicism in Honduras
