= Iglesia Ortodoxa de Antioquía San Juan Bautista =

Saint John the Baptist Orthodox Church of Antioch

Iglesia Ortodoxa de Antioquía San Juan Bautista (Saint John the Baptist Orthodox Church of Antioch) is a Greek Orthodox cathedral in San Pedro Sula, Honduras. The cathedral was founded in 1963, as the first Eastern Orthodox church building in Central America. The cathedral is the sole parish of the Antiochian Orthodox Apostolic Catholic Church of Honduras (Spanish: Iglesia Católica Apostólica Ortodoxa Antioqueña de Honduras), which belongs to the Archdiocese of Mexico, Venezuela, Central America and the Caribbean of the Greek Orthodox Patriarchate of Antioch and All the East.
