= St. John the Baptist Cathedral, Santa Cruz do Sul =

Coordinates: 29.7194°S 52.4271°W

St. John the Baptist Cathedral
- Catedral São João Batista
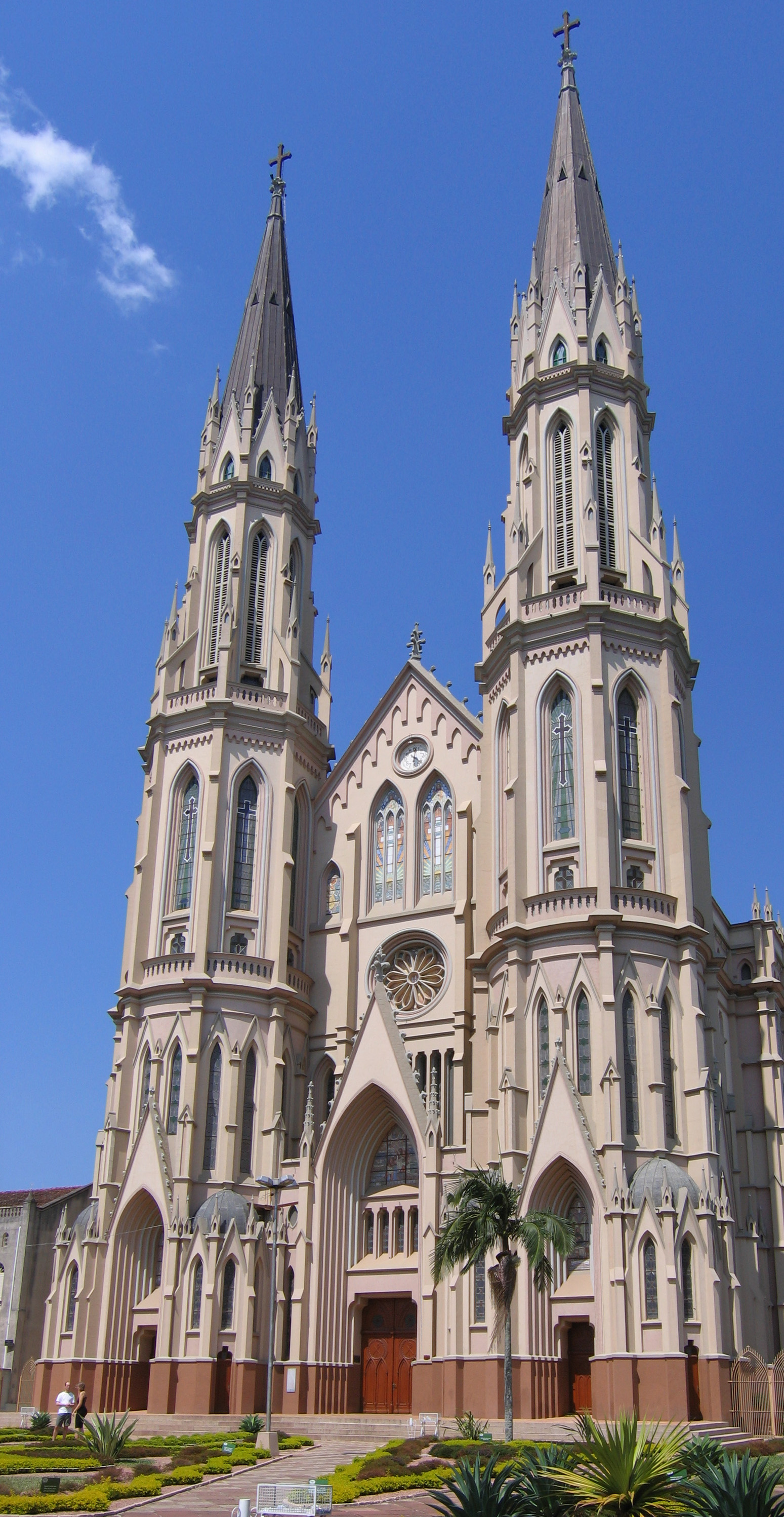
- St. John the Baptist Cathedral
- Location: Santa Cruz do Sul
- Country: Brazil
- Denomination: Roman Catholic Church

The St. John the Baptist Cathedral, (Portuguese: Catedral São João Batista) also called Santa Cruz do Sul Cathedral, is a Roman Catholic cathedral located in the central area of Santa Cruz do Sul, in front of Getúlio Vargas Square in Brazil.

It has a height of 26 meters in its central nave but the towers reach 83 meters.

Construction started on February 1, 1928, under the direction of Simon Gramlich, author of the project and later under the direction of engineer Ernesto Matheis.

On August 2, 1936, the church was ready, but the work was completed only in 1977 with the construction of two main towers.

In 1959, with the creation of the Diocese of Santa Cruz do Sul, with jurisdiction over several municipalities, the church became known as the cathedral of St. John the Baptist.

== See also ==
- Roman Catholicism in Brazil
- St. John the Baptist Cathedral
