= St. John's Cathedral =

This list is for St. John the Evangelist Cathedrals. For St. John the Baptist Cathedrals, see St. John the Baptist Cathedral (disambiguation)

St. John's Cathedral, St. John Cathedral, or Cathedral of St. John, or other variations on the name, with or without the suffix 'the Evangelist', may refer to:

== Antigua ==
- St. John's Cathedral (Antigua and Barbuda)

== Australia ==
- St John's Cathedral (Brisbane), in Queensland
- St John's Cathedral, Parramatta, in Sydney, New South Wales

== Belize ==
- St. John's Cathedral (Belize City)

== Canada ==
- St. John Cathedral (Edmonton), Alberta
- Cathedral of St. John (Winnipeg), Manitoba
- St. John's Cathedral (Toronto), Ontario
- Cathedral of St. John the Evangelist (Saskatoon), Saskatchewan

== China ==
- St John's Cathedral, Langzhong

== Cyprus ==
- St. John's Cathedral, Nicosia

== France ==
- Besançon Cathedral (Cathédrale Saint-Jean de Besançon)

== Hong Kong ==
- St John's Cathedral (Hong Kong)

== Hungary ==
- Cathedral Basilica of St. John the Apostle, Eger

== India ==
- St. John's Cathedral, Tiruvalla

== Ireland ==
- St John's Cathedral (Limerick)

== Malaysia ==
- St. John's Cathedral (Kuala Lumpur)

== Malta ==
- St John's Co-Cathedral, Valletta

== Netherlands ==
- St. John's Cathedral ('s-Hertogenbosch)

== New Zealand ==
- St John's Cathedral, Napier (officially the Waiapu Cathedral of Saint John the Evangelist)

== Philippines ==
- Dagupan Cathedral, Pangasinan

== Poland ==
- St. John's Archcathedral, Warsaw
- Wrocław Cathedral (Cathedral of St. John the Baptist in Wrocław)

== South Africa ==
- St John's Cathedral, Mthatha

== Taiwan ==
- St. John's Cathedral (Chiayi)
- St. John's Cathedral (Taipei)

== Turkey ==
- St. John's Cathedral (Izmir)

== United Kingdom ==
- St John's Cathedral, Oban, Scotland
- Cathedral of St John the Evangelist, Portsmouth

== United States ==
(by state then city)

- St. John's Cathedral (Los Angeles), California
- St. John Cathedral (Fresno, California)
- Cathedral of St. John in the Wilderness, Denver, Colorado
- Cathedral Church of St. John (Wilmington, Delaware)
- St. John's Cathedral (Jacksonville), Florida
- Cathedral of St. John the Evangelist (Boise, Idaho), listed on the NRHP
- St. John's Cathedral (Lafayette, Louisiana), listed on the NRHP
- Cathedral of St. John the Divine, New York City
- Cathedral Church of St. John (Albuquerque, New Mexico)
- Cathedral of St. John the Evangelist (Cleveland), Ohio
- Cathedral of St. John (Providence, Rhode Island)
- St. John's Cathedral (Knoxville, Tennessee)
- Cathedral of St. John the Evangelist (Spokane, Washington)
- Cathedral of St. John the Evangelist (Milwaukee), Wisconsin

== See also ==
- St. John the Baptist Cathedral (disambiguation)
- San Juan Cathedral (disambiguation)
