= El Anunciador de Cortés =

Honduran newspaper

- Type: Weekly
- Editor-in-chief: José Maria Nuila
- Founded: 1914
- Ceased publication: 1919
- Political alignment: Independent
- Language: Spanish language
- Headquarters: San Pedro Sula

El Anunciador de Cortés was an independent weekly newspaper published from San Pedro Sula, Honduras. It was published 1914-1917 and again in 1919. José Maria Nuila was the owner, director and editor of the newspaper.
