= St. Peter the Apostle Cathedral, San Pedro Sula =

Church in San Pedro Sula, Honduras

San Pedro Sula Metropolitan Cathedral
- Catedral Metropolitana San Pedro Apóstol (Metropolitan Cathedral of St. Peter the Apostle).
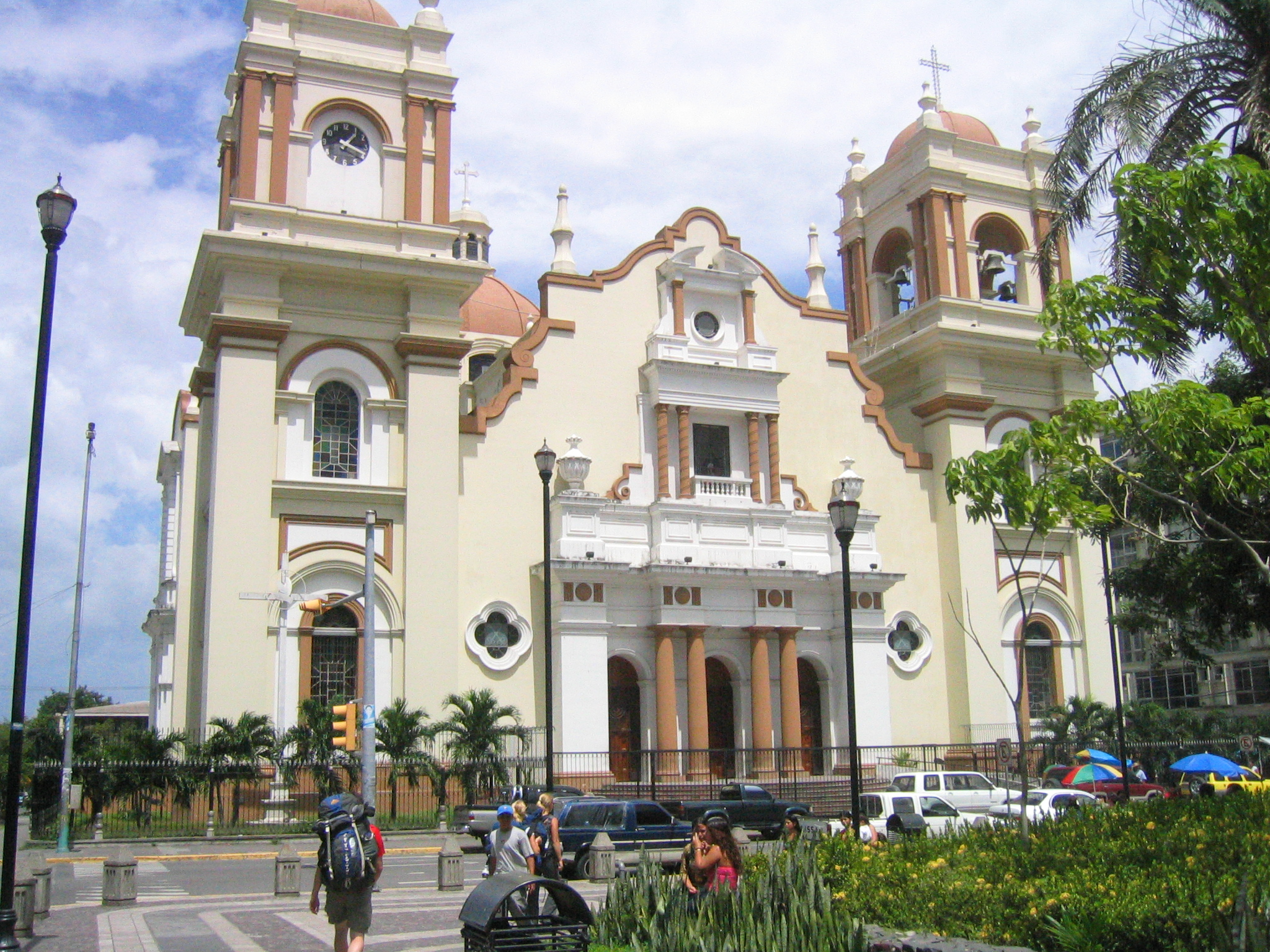
- San Pedro Sula Metropolitan Cathedral
- 15.5053°N 88.0241°W
- Location: 3 Avenida S.O, Barrio El Centro, San Pedro Sula
- Country: Honduras
- Denomination: Roman Catholic

Architecture
- Architect: José Francisco Zalazar
- Architectural type: Mission Revival Style architecture
- Completed: 1949

Administration
- Diocese: Archdiocese of San Pedro Sula

Clergy
- Archbishop: Michael Lenihan
- Rector: Fr. Glenis Mejía

The Metropolitan Cathedral of St. Peter the Apostle, commonly called the San Pedro Sula Cathedral, is a Roman Catholic church in San Pedro Sula, Honduras.

== Location ==
The cathedral is located on a block along 1 Calle in San Pedro Sula, situated between 2 Avenida SO and 3 Avenida SO, with its rear on 2 Calle SO. Next to it is a public park called Parque Central.

== History ==
The cathedral was built in 1949. It was designed in the Mission Revival architectural style by architect José Francisco Zalazar. It is named for Saint Peter. It is one of the main cathedrals in Honduras, where most of the population is Roman Catholic. In 2023 it was elevated to Metropolitan see as Pope Francis created the Ecclesiastical Province of San Pedro Sula, transforming the Diocese into a Metropolitan see of the new Archdiocese of San Pedro Sula

According to Lonely Planet, it features "high, pale-yellow walls and pillars, and an even higher central cupola." It is decorated with hand-carved wooden statues and religious paintings of Saints.

== See also ==
- List of cathedrals in Honduras
