= St. John the Baptist Cathedral, Carora =

St. John the Baptist Cathedral
- Catedral de San Juan Bautista de Carora
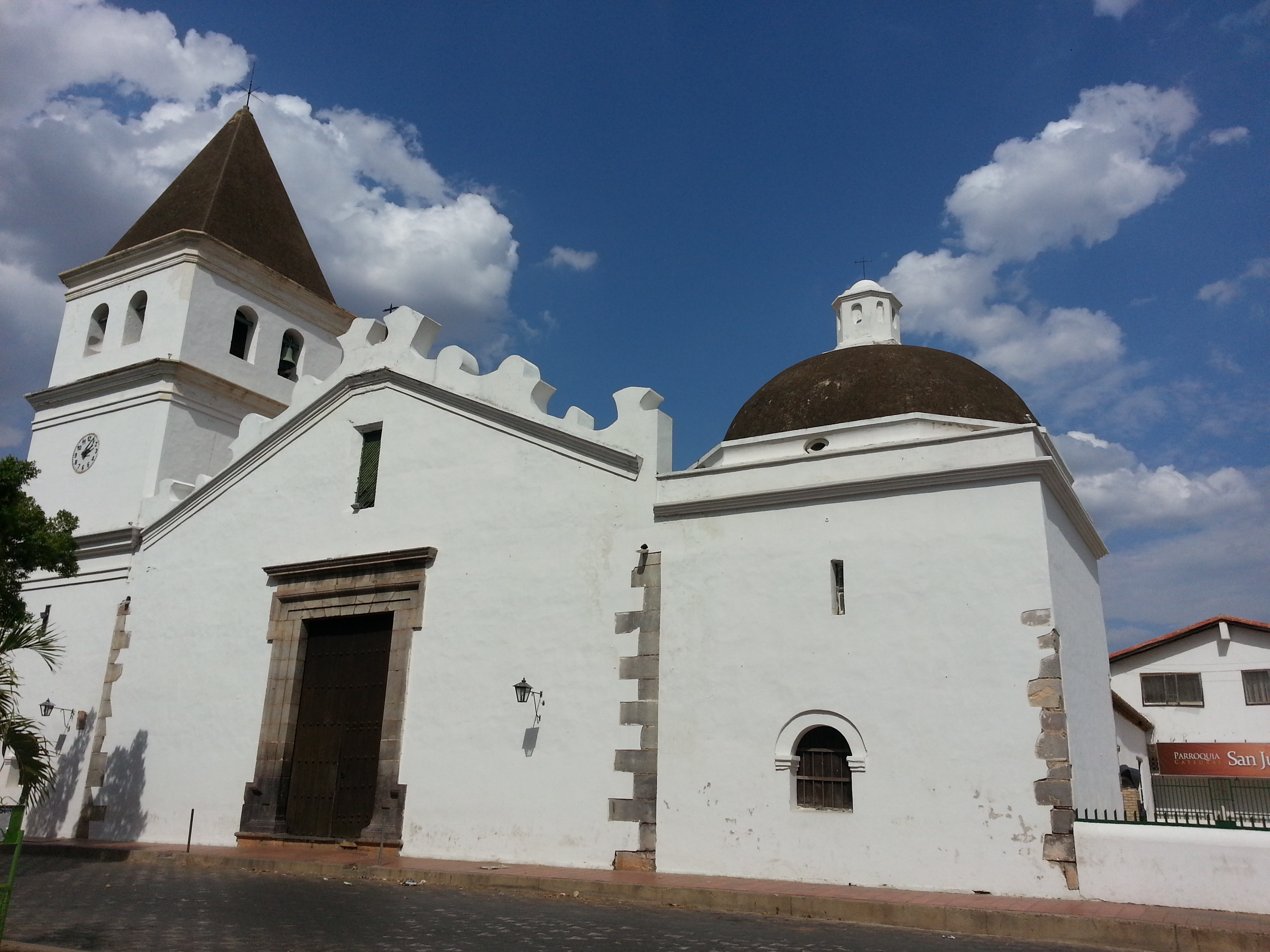
- St. John the Baptist Cathedral
- Location: Carora
- Country: Venezuela
- Denomination: Roman Catholic Church

The St. John the Baptist Cathedral (Spanish: Catedral de San Juan Bautista de Carora) or simply Cathedral of Carora, is a Catholic building located in the San Juan street between Bolivar and Lara Avenues of the city of Carora, in the municipality of Pedro León Torres, in the Lara state in the west central part of the South American country of Venezuela.

The cathedral follows the Roman or Latin rite and is completely decorated in white, and has a great religious, historical, heritage value and is a major tourist spot. It serves as the seat of the Catholic Diocese of Carora (Dioecesis Carorensis) which was established on July 22, 1992 with the papal bull Certiori christifidelium of Pope John Paul II. It is officially a cathedral since November 11, 1992.

The cathedral is located in the colonial area, opposite the Bolivar Square. Its construction lasted about a hundred years. It is the colonial baroque style with elements of Renaissance architecture. Built in the early 1600s, the building was already active in 1658, in 1745 the high altar was created and in 1825 was damaged by a fire so it had to be rebuilt.

== See also ==
- List of cathedrals in Venezuela
- Roman Catholicism in Venezuela
- St. John the Baptist Cathedral (disambiguation)
