= Tulancingo Cathedral =

Coordinates: 20.0806°N 98.3678°W

St. John the Baptist Cathedral
- Catedral de San Juan Bautista
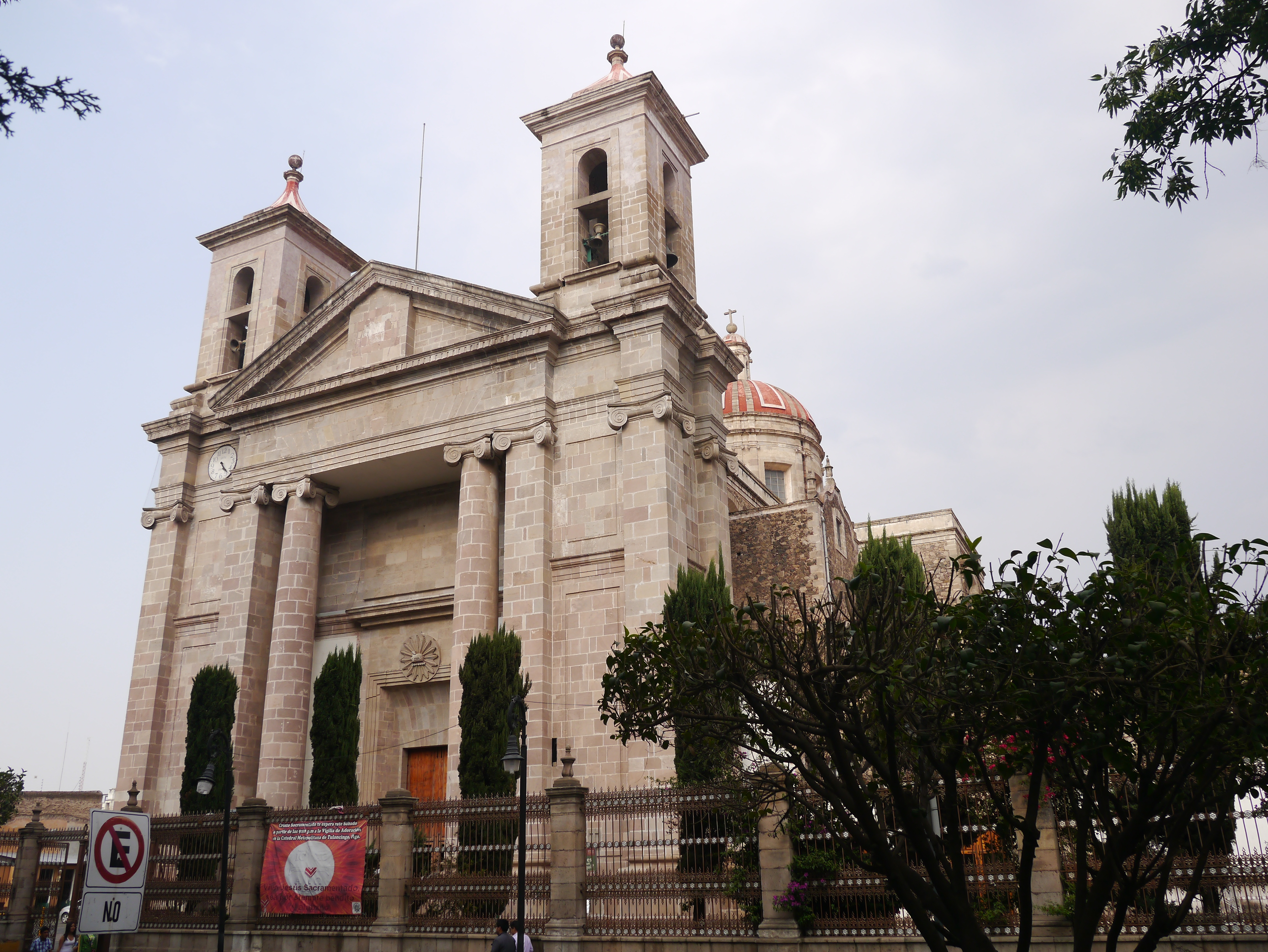
- St. John the Baptist Cathedral
- Location: Tulancingo
- Country: Mexico
- Denomination: Roman Catholic Church

The St. John the Baptist Cathedral (Spanish: Catedral de San Juan Bautista) Also Tulancingo Cathedral It is a Catholic religious building that constitutes a work of the architecture of colonial Mexico built from 1528 by the Franciscan Order. Its combination of imposing and yet simple elements stand out in the historical center of Tulancingo, in the state of Hidalgo, in front of the main square La Floresta.

The building was originally of smaller proportions, built by the religious Franciscans catholic, who evangelized all the zone. It was renovated and expanded in the year 1788 by the architect José Damián Ortiz de Castro, who also collaborated in the planning and completion of the Cathedral of Mexico. It is understandable the modification of the style by this architect, due to the Mexico that at that time went through the transition from the baroque, to the simplicity of the Neoclassic.

== See also ==
- Roman Catholicism in Mexico
- St. John the Baptist Cathedral

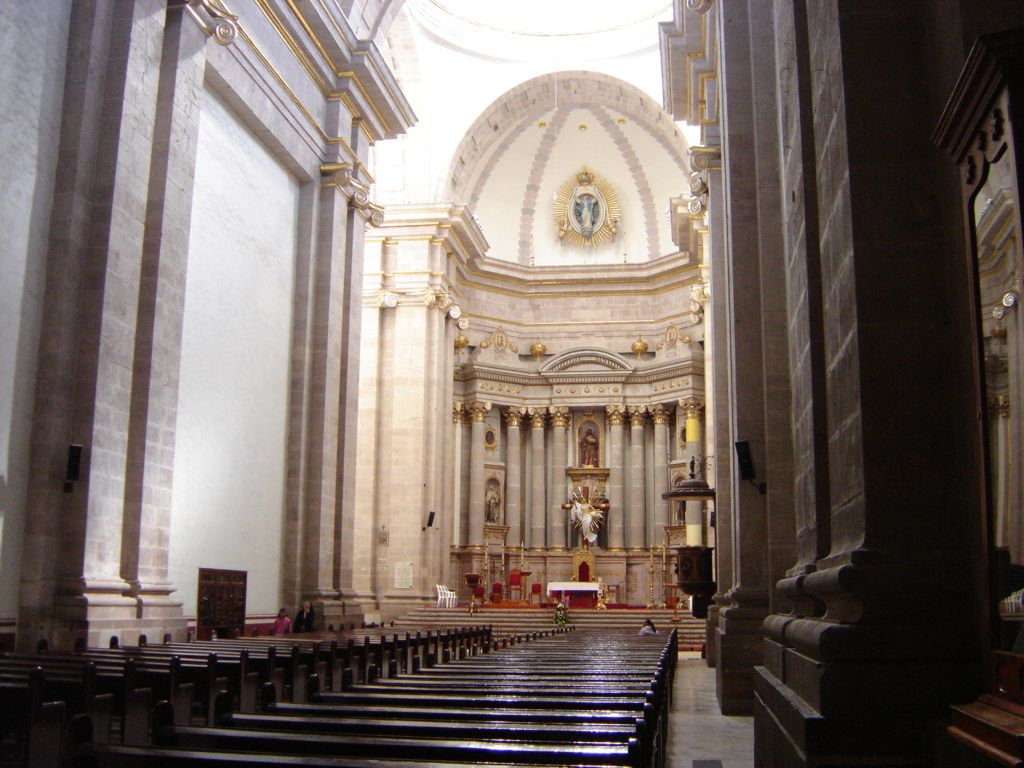
Internal View
