= Iquitos Cathedral =

Coordinates: 3.7294°S 73.2383°W

St. John the Baptist Cathedral
- Catedral San Juan Bautista
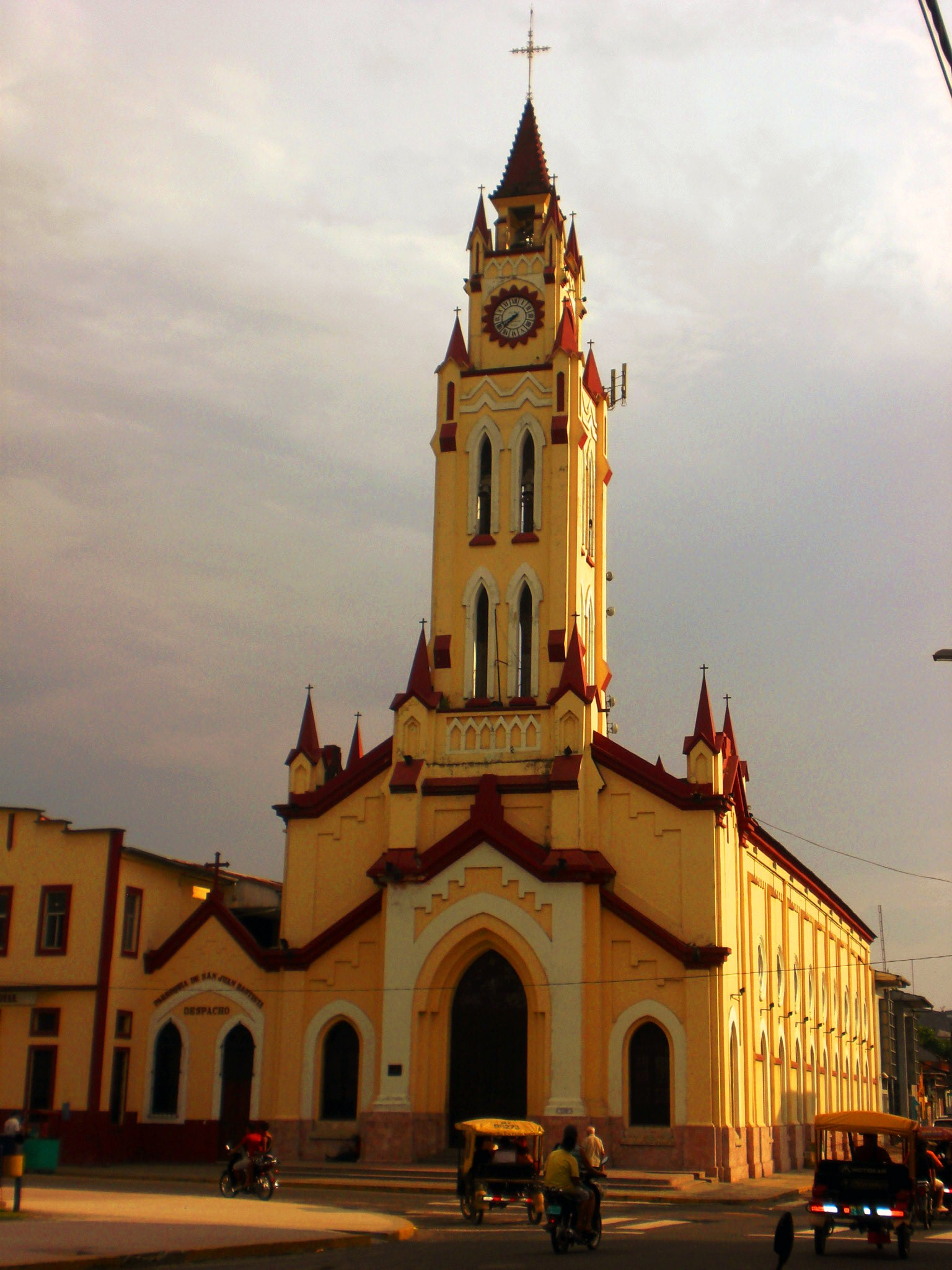
- St. John the Baptist Cathedral
- Location: Iquitos
- Country: Peru
- Denomination: Roman Catholic Church

The St. John the Baptist Cathedral (Spanish: Catedral San Juan Bautista, Catedral Metropolitana de Iquitos) also called Iquitos Cathedral is the main Catholic church in neo-Gothic style in the city of Iquitos in Peru, with an important value in the historic center of the town. It is located specifically in Iquitos Center at the intersection of Arica and Putumayo streets, and is home of Bishop Miguel Olaortua Laspra.

It is a property of the Catholic Church, and was declared Cultural Heritage of the Nation of Peru in 1996, and is considered an urban icon in Iquitos.

Currently, it is the highest religious temple, and one of the assets that are in better condition in that city. Iquitos Cathedral also notable for including a crypt.

Construction of the cathedral began in 1911 after the demolition of the ancient temple and was inaugurated on March 16, 1919, with the tower being finished the 1924.

== See also ==
- Roman Catholicism in Peru
- St. John the Baptist Cathedral (disambiguation)

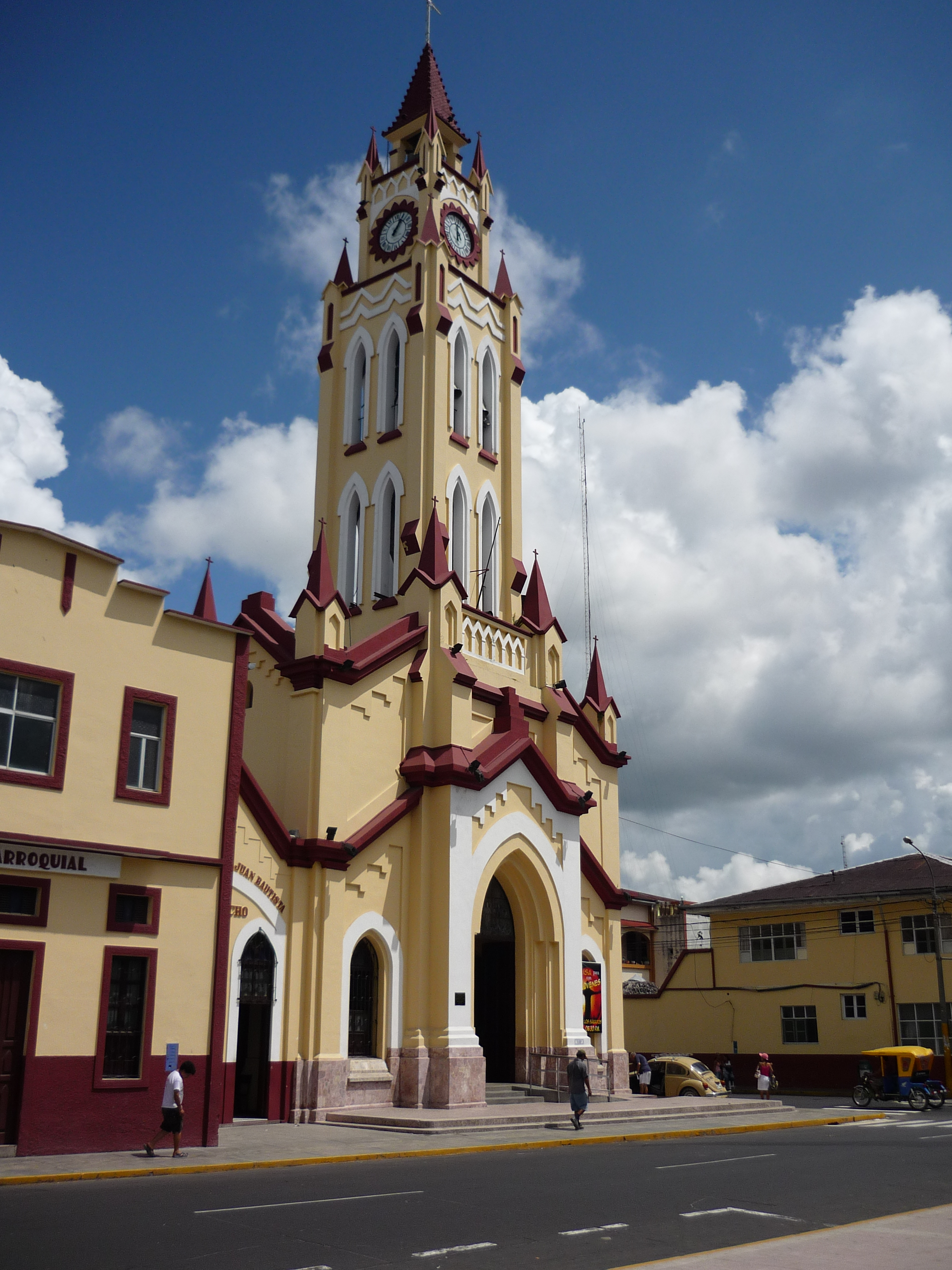
another view
