= San Pedro Sula =

- City and municipality
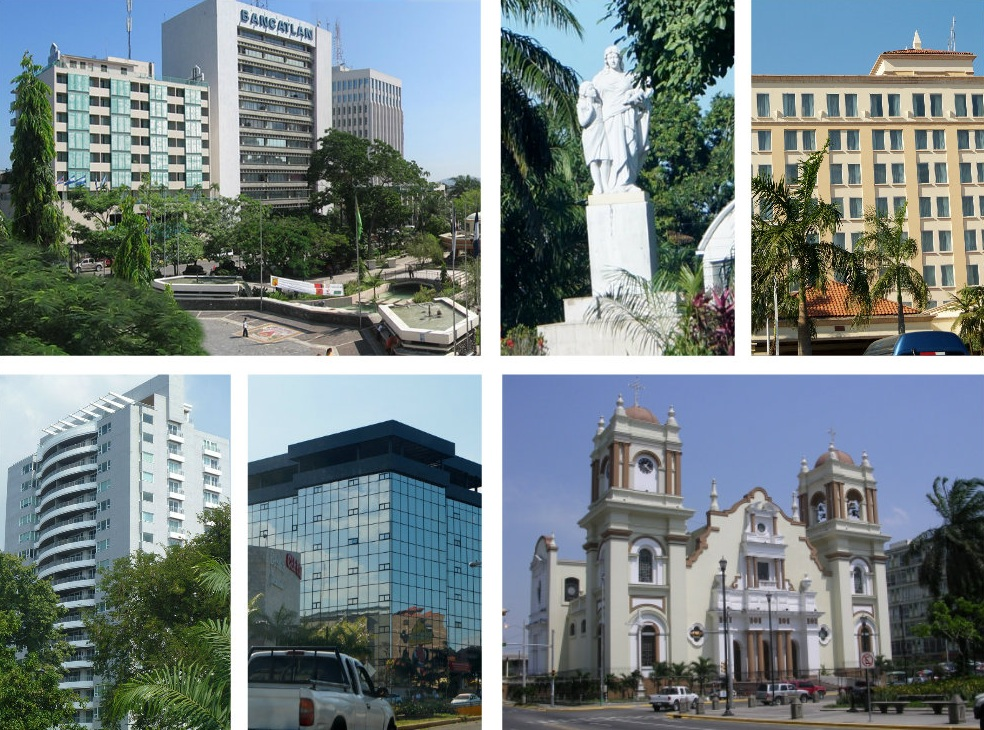
- Left to right: Bancatlán building, Monument to the Mother, Hotel Real Intercontinental, Río de Piedras Building, Building in Zona Viva, and San Pedro Cathedral.

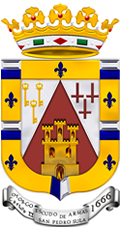
- Flag Seal
- Nicknames: La Capital Industrial, Sap
- Location within Honduras Location within Central America
- Coordinates: 15°30′0″N 88°2′0″W
- Country: Honduras
- Department: Cortés
- Municipio (County): San Pedro Sula
- Foundation: 27 June 1536; 490 years ago

Government
  - Mayor: Roberto Contreras (PLH)

Area
  - City: 856 km^{2} (331 sq mi)
- Elevation: 83 m (272 ft)

Population (2023 projection)
  - City: 834,883
  - Rank: 2nd in Honduras; 4th in Central America
  - Density: 975/km^{2} (2,530/sq mi)
  - Urban: 793,835
  - Metro: 1,445,598

GDP (PPP, 2015 int. dollar)
  - Total: $8.7 billion (2023)
  - Per capita: $8,900 (2023)
- Time zone: UTC−6 (Central America)

San Pedro Sula (Spanish pronunciation: [sam ˈpeðɾo ˈsula]) is the capital of Cortés Department, Honduras. It is located in the northwest corner of the country in the Sula Valley, about 50 kilometers (31 miles) south of Puerto Cortés on the Caribbean Sea. With a population of 701,200 in the central urban area (2023 calculation) and a population of 1,445,598 in its metropolitan area in 2023, it is the nation's primary industrial center and second largest city after the capital Tegucigalpa, and the largest city in Central America that is not a capital city.

== History ==
Before the arrival of the Spanish, the Sula Valley was home to approximately 50,000 native inhabitants. The area that is home to the modern city served as a local trade hub for the Mayan and Aztec civilizations. The Spanish conquest brought about a demographic collapse from which the native population would never recover.

On 27 June 1536, Don Pedro de Alvarado founded a Spanish town beside the Indian settlement of Choloma, with the name of Villa de Señor San Pedro de Puerto Caballos (modern San Pedro Sula). The new town had 35 Spanish citizens, and Alvarado allocated 200 of his slaves to help build the new town and work the surrounding fields. He sent out expeditions into outlying regions to secure the new town, extend the area of Spanish domination, and commandeer supplies. Alvarado annulled all encomienda rights established in the area under Andres de Cerezeda, and reassigned the villages to the citizens of San Pedro.

The new settlement barely survived the colonial period. In 1601, the Spanish government declared Santo Tomás as the official port for the Central American colonies; this move diverted exports from Puerto Cortés and resulted in an economic decline that would last through the 17th century. Additionally, San Pedro Sula was left exposed to raids by pirates and French, Dutch, and English mercenaries. By the mid-18th century, the Spanish government decided to build a number of coastal fortresses to curb English attacks. One of these fortresses, the Fortaleza de San Fernando, was built in Omoa, less than 50 miles from San Pedro Sula. The subsequent increase in trade supported an increase in population from 70 inhabitants in 1714 to 357 in 1789.

Post-independence San Pedro Sula remained an impoverished village, dependent on trade between Omoa and the country's interior. In 1875, Frank Frye, the American consul in the Bay Islands, reported a population of 1200. The city benefitted from the growth of the banana trade in the 1870s and 1880s and formed a close relationship with US-based shipper and railroad entrepreneur Samuel Zemurray's Cuyamel Fruit Company, and the construction of the Interoceanic Railroad between 1869 and 1874 which connected the city to the coast at Puerto Cortés. Zemurray worked closely with local elites who invested in subsidiary enterprises and thus shaped the way politically for Cuyamel to establish itself and pay very few taxes.

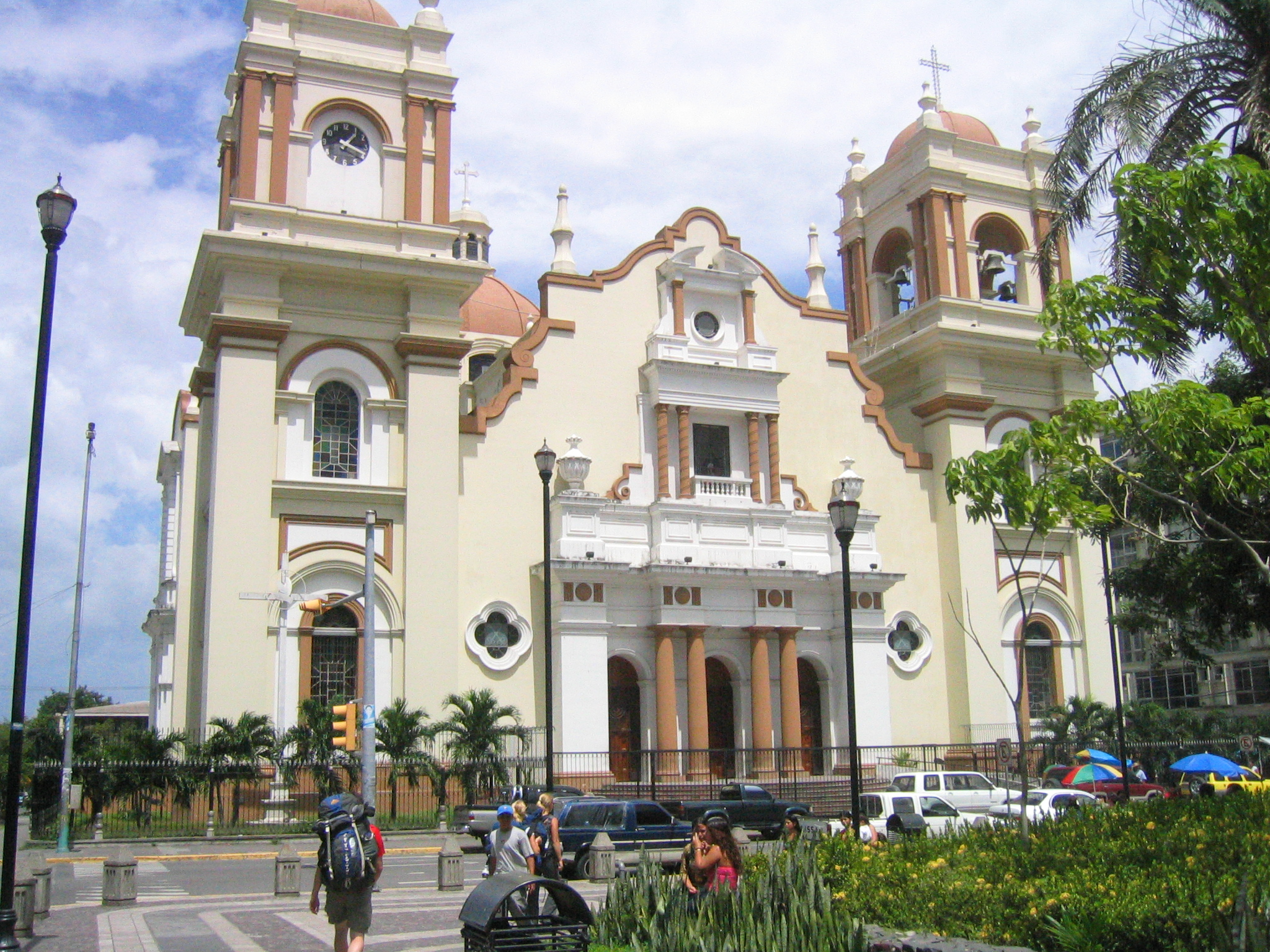
San Pedro Sula Cathedral

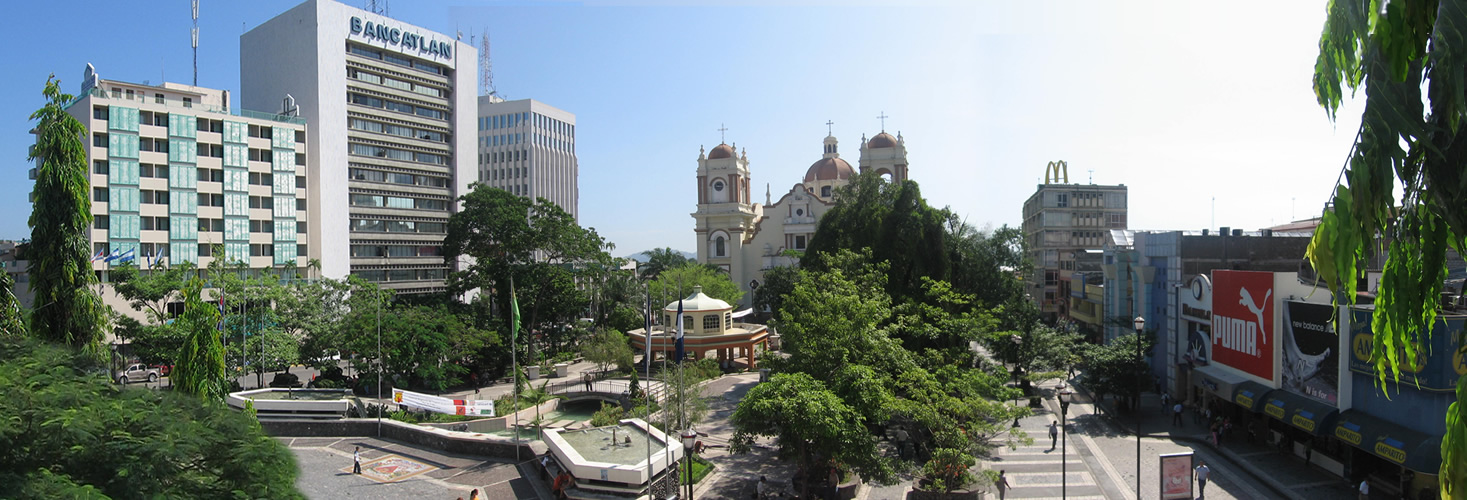
Panoramic view of Downtown San Pedro Sula

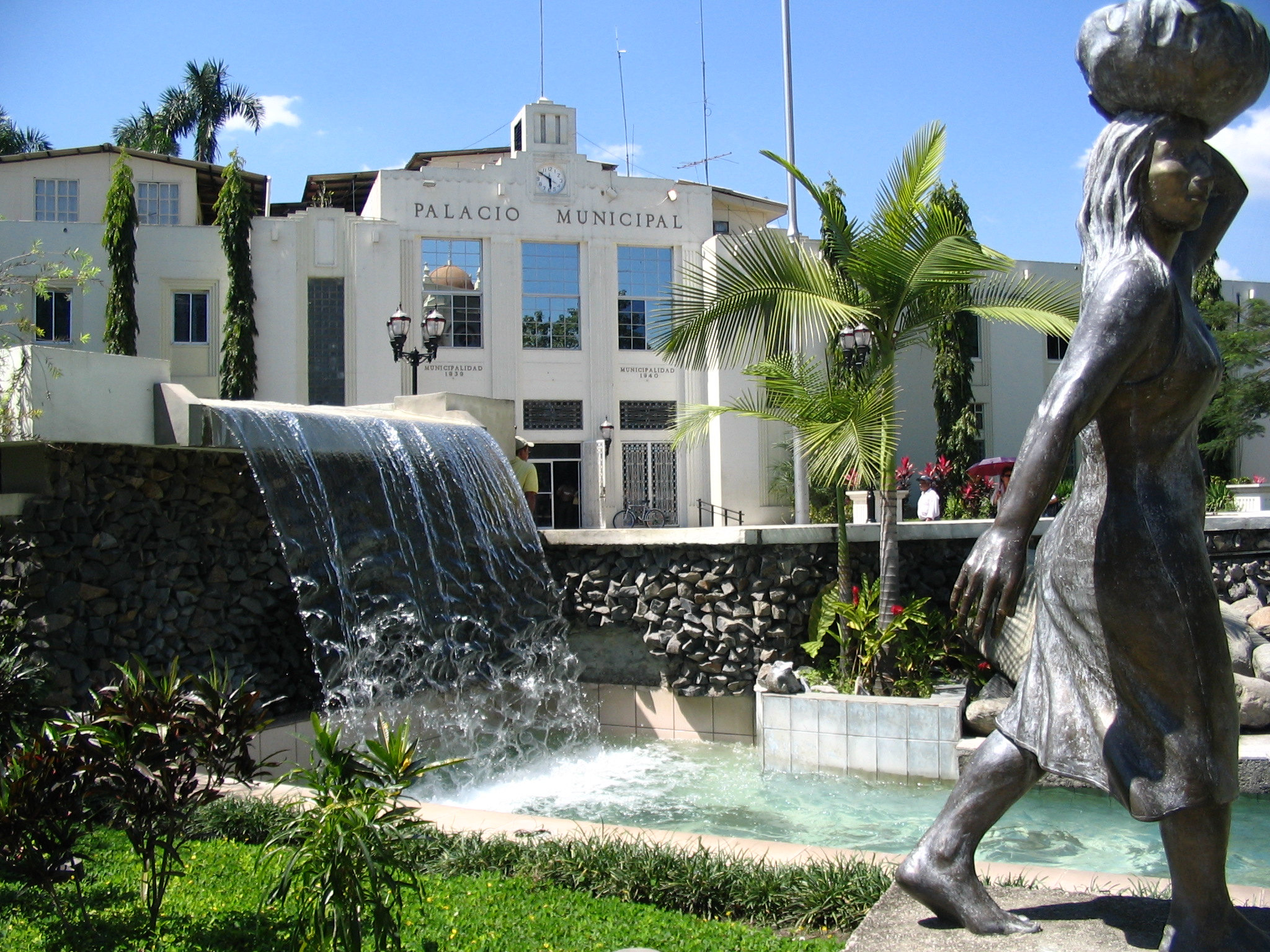
Municipal Palace

== Economy ==
In 2013, fifteen years after the effects of Hurricane Mitch, Honduras is one of the poorest countries in Latin America; around San Pedro Sula, banana production has not fully recovered, and "manufacturing has all but dried up." The problems are exacerbated by organized gangs, whose rules prevent residents from safely leaving gang-controlled neighborhoods such as Chamelecón for jobs in other parts of town.

In 2000, then-Mayor Roberto Larios Silva said "San Pedro Sula is where the economic development of the country is concentrated via the city's industrial, commercial, and financial development." The then-manager of Hotel Copantl attributed its growth in business-related tourism ...[to] the maquila (apparel manufacturing) industry.

As of 2011, San Pedro Sula generated two-thirds of the country's gross domestic product (GDP).

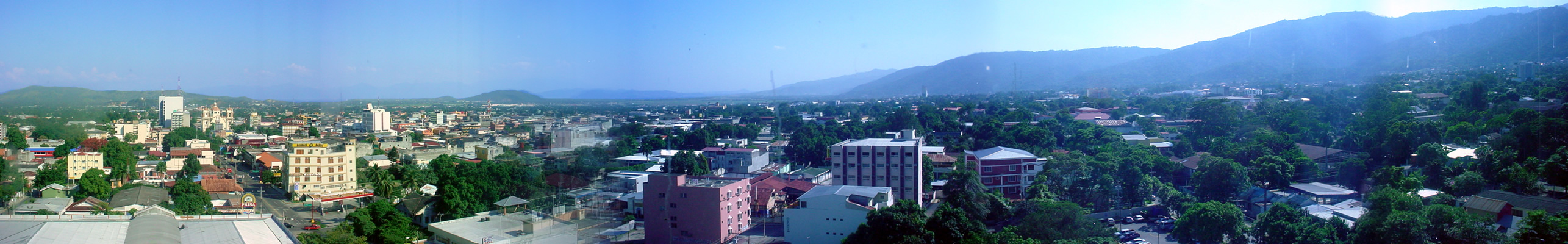
Panoramic of the city.

== Crime ==
San Pedro Sula was the "murder capital of the world" until early 2016 when Caracas, Venezuela, surpassed its homicide rate. Since the 2009 Honduran military coup "unemployment and underemployment rates have doubled while the number of people living in extreme poverty has skyrocketed." In 2013, the city had 187 homicides per 100,000 residents, surpassing the 148 per 100,000 of Ciudad Juarez, Mexico. The latter had previously topped the list for three consecutive years, with about three homicides per day. Both cities are major operational and strategic distribution points in the illegal drug trade, particularly to the United States, and have significant gang activity. In response, authorities launched Operation Lightning, saturating violence hotspots with police and soldiers. Meanwhile, arms trafficking has flooded the country, with just under 70% of all firearms being illegal. 83% of homicides in the city involve firearms.

According to the Los Angeles Times, "the homicide rate is stoked by the rivalry of the brutal street gangs, mostly descendants of gangs formed in Los Angeles and deported to Central America in the 1990s, including Mara Salvatrucha (MS-13) and the 18th Street gang. Their ranks are fed by the disastrous economy of Honduras, and emboldened more recently by alliances with Mexican drug traffickers moving cocaine through the country."

Crime and economic stress have led to the migration of large numbers of unaccompanied minors to the US border. The latest data from the CBP shows San Pedro Sula as the major source for Unaccompanied Alien Children (UAC) migrating from Honduras.

== Geography ==
=== Climate ===
San Pedro Sula has a tropical wet and dry climate (Aw) under the Köppen climate classification, with a dry season spanning from January through May and a wet season covering the remaining months. The city experiences relatively high temperatures year-round and some rainfall. However, it does not quite fall under the tropical monsoon climate category. San Pedro Sula has experienced hurricanes and tropical storms and is prone to them during the hurricane season, usually when the storms form in the southern part of the Caribbean or Western Africa.

Climate data for San Pedro Sula, Honduras (La Mesa International Airport) 1961–1990, extremes 1944–present
| Month | Jan | Feb | Mar | Apr | May | Jun | Jul | Aug | Sep | Oct | Nov | Dec | Year |
|---|---|---|---|---|---|---|---|---|---|---|---|---|---|
| Record high °C (°F) | 37.2 (99.0) | 39.5 (103.1) | 42.8 (109.0) | 42.0 (107.6) | 42.0 (107.6) | 41.1 (106.0) | 38.0 (100.4) | 38.8 (101.8) | 39.2 (102.6) | 37.8 (100.0) | 37.5 (99.5) | 37.0 (98.6) | 42.8 (109.0) |
| Mean daily maximum °C (°F) | 29.2 (84.6) | 30.4 (86.7) | 33.0 (91.4) | 34.0 (93.2) | 35.2 (95.4) | 34.3 (93.7) | 33.3 (91.9) | 33.4 (92.1) | 33.5 (92.3) | 31.6 (88.9) | 30.2 (86.4) | 29.2 (84.6) | 32.3 (90.1) |
| Daily mean °C (°F) | 23.5 (74.3) | 24.1 (75.4) | 25.8 (78.4) | 27.1 (80.8) | 28.1 (82.6) | 27.7 (81.9) | 27.1 (80.8) | 27.3 (81.1) | 27.2 (81.0) | 26.0 (78.8) | 24.7 (76.5) | 23.7 (74.7) | 26.0 (78.8) |
| Mean daily minimum °C (°F) | 19.8 (67.6) | 20.0 (68.0) | 21.4 (70.5) | 22.5 (72.5) | 23.8 (74.8) | 23.8 (74.8) | 23.2 (73.8) | 23.3 (73.9) | 23.3 (73.9) | 22.5 (72.5) | 21.4 (70.5) | 20.4 (68.7) | 22.1 (71.8) |
| Record low °C (°F) | 12.8 (55.0) | 10.0 (50.0) | 13.4 (56.1) | 15.0 (59.0) | 20.2 (68.4) | 17.0 (62.6) | 18.9 (66.0) | 18.9 (66.0) | 18.9 (66.0) | 13.9 (57.0) | 15.0 (59.0) | 12.8 (55.0) | 10.0 (50.0) |
| Average precipitation mm (inches) | 72.0 (2.83) | 59.6 (2.35) | 32.0 (1.26) | 32.1 (1.26) | 62.9 (2.48) | 142.4 (5.61) | 110.2 (4.34) | 105.7 (4.16) | 151.7 (5.97) | 147.8 (5.82) | 135.3 (5.33) | 121.7 (4.79) | 1,173.4 (46.20) |
| Average precipitation days (≥ 1.0 mm) | 6 | 5 | 3 | 4 | 4 | 10 | 10 | 10 | 10 | 10 | 9 | 8 | 89 |
| Average relative humidity (%) | 84 | 81 | 77 | 75 | 74 | 76 | 79 | 79 | 79 | 81 | 83 | 85 | 80 |
| Mean monthly sunshine hours | 186.0 | 178.0 | 238.7 | 222.0 | 220.1 | 201.0 | 210.8 | 198.4 | 183.0 | 198.4 | 156.0 | 155.0 | 2,347.4 |
| Mean daily sunshine hours | 6.0 | 6.3 | 7.7 | 7.4 | 7.1 | 6.7 | 6.8 | 6.4 | 6.1 | 6.4 | 5.2 | 5.0 | 6.4 |
Source 1: NOAA
Source 2: Deutscher Wetterdienst (sun and humidity), Meteo Climat (record highs and lows)

== Administrative divisions ==
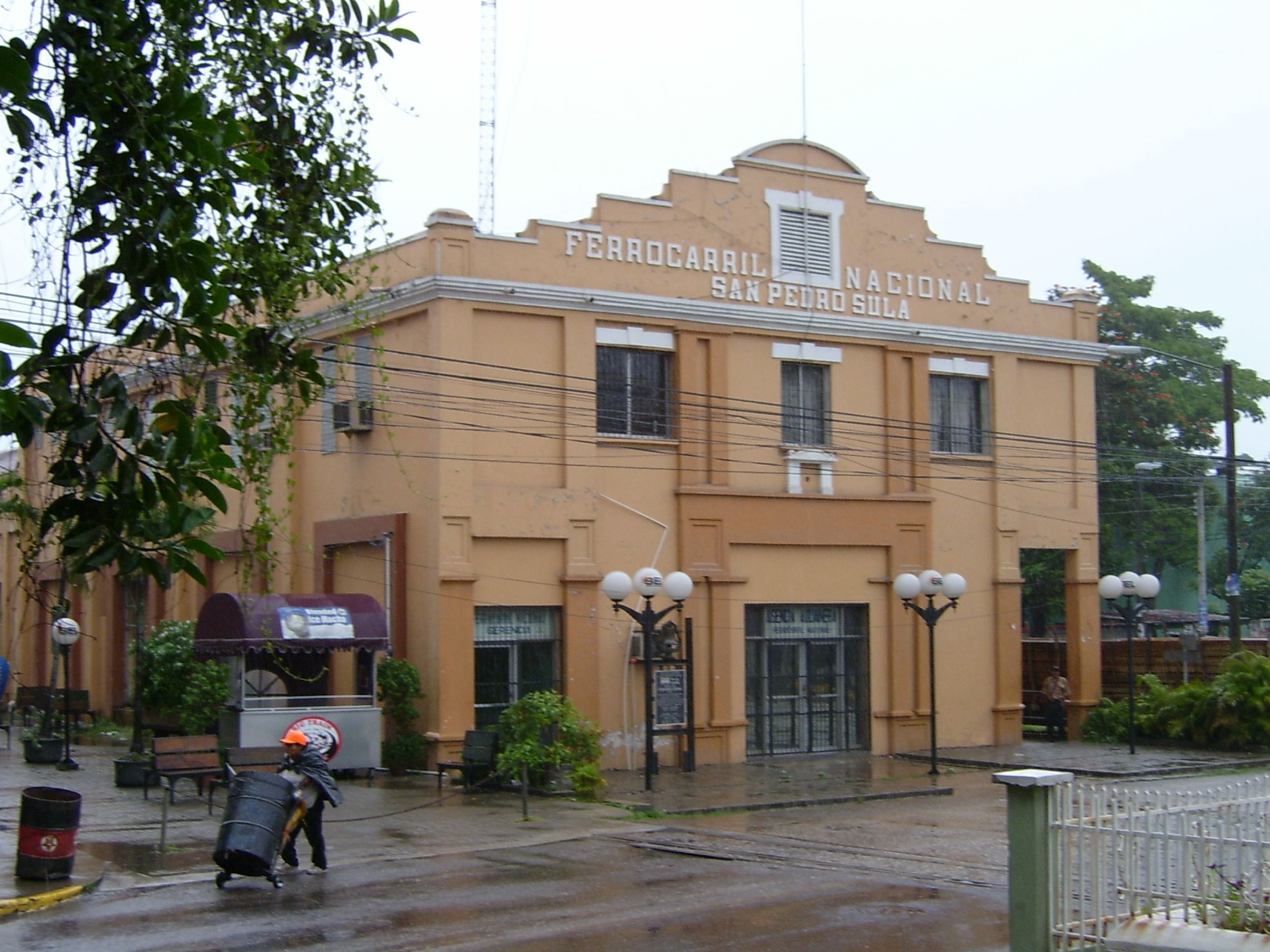
San Pedro Sula's Old Train Station.

San Pedro Sula, as most cities built under the Spanish colonial period, is divided in quadrants. Avenues in the city run from north to south and streets run from east to west. First Street and First Avenue mark the "center of the city" and effectively divide it into four major quadrants NW, NE, SW and SE.

=== Southwest ===
Barrio El Benque, the business district, is just to the west and south of the center, and other neighborhoods in the suroeste include Barrio Paz Barahona, Barrio La Guardia, Colonia Altamira, Colonia Mesetas, Barrio Río de Piedras, Barrio Suyapa (from 12 Avenida S out to Avenida Circunvalación, from 7 Calle S to 10 Calles S), Colonia Hernandez, Barrio Prado Alto, and Colonia El Chamelecón. The latter includes area from 23 Avenida S west to 27 Avenida S, from 1 Calle (named Bulevar Los Próceres there) south to 5 Calle S0. To the south of Colonia El Chamelecón are Colonia Dubón, Colonia Figueroa, Colonia Trejo (from 10 Calle S to 12 Calle S, from about Avenida Circunvalación to 25 Avenida S, including the Consulate of Nicaragua), Colonia Altamira, and Colonia Altiplano. Colonia Las Mesetas runs from 12 Calle S to 14 Calle S, from 21 Avenida A (S) to past 24 Avenida S.

=== Northwest ===
Barrio Guamilito is just to the west and north of the center. Noroeste neighborhoods include Colonia Moderna (from 1 Calle to 5 Calle NO, from Avendia Circunvalación to the river beyond 24 Avenida), Colonia La Mora (from 5 Calle NO to 7 Calle NO, from Avendia Circunvalación to the río beyond 24 Avenida), Colonia Zeron, the Colonia Columbia by the Universidad de San Pedro Sula, Barrio La Cervecería and Barrio Guadalupe. Across the river along which 24 Avenida runs is Colonia Juan Lindo and Colonia Jardines Del Valle.

From the river past 24 Avenida, north to 25 Calle and west to 12 Avenida, is Colonia Universidad. Universidad de San Pedro Sula is to its south, across the river. West of Colonia Universidad is Colonia Country, a small neighborhood including the Academia Americana, and Colonia Villas del Sol, which runs from Boulevard Mackey west to include Universidad Nacional Autonoma de Honduras en el Valle de Sula, and goes north to Río Bermejo but does not cross it.

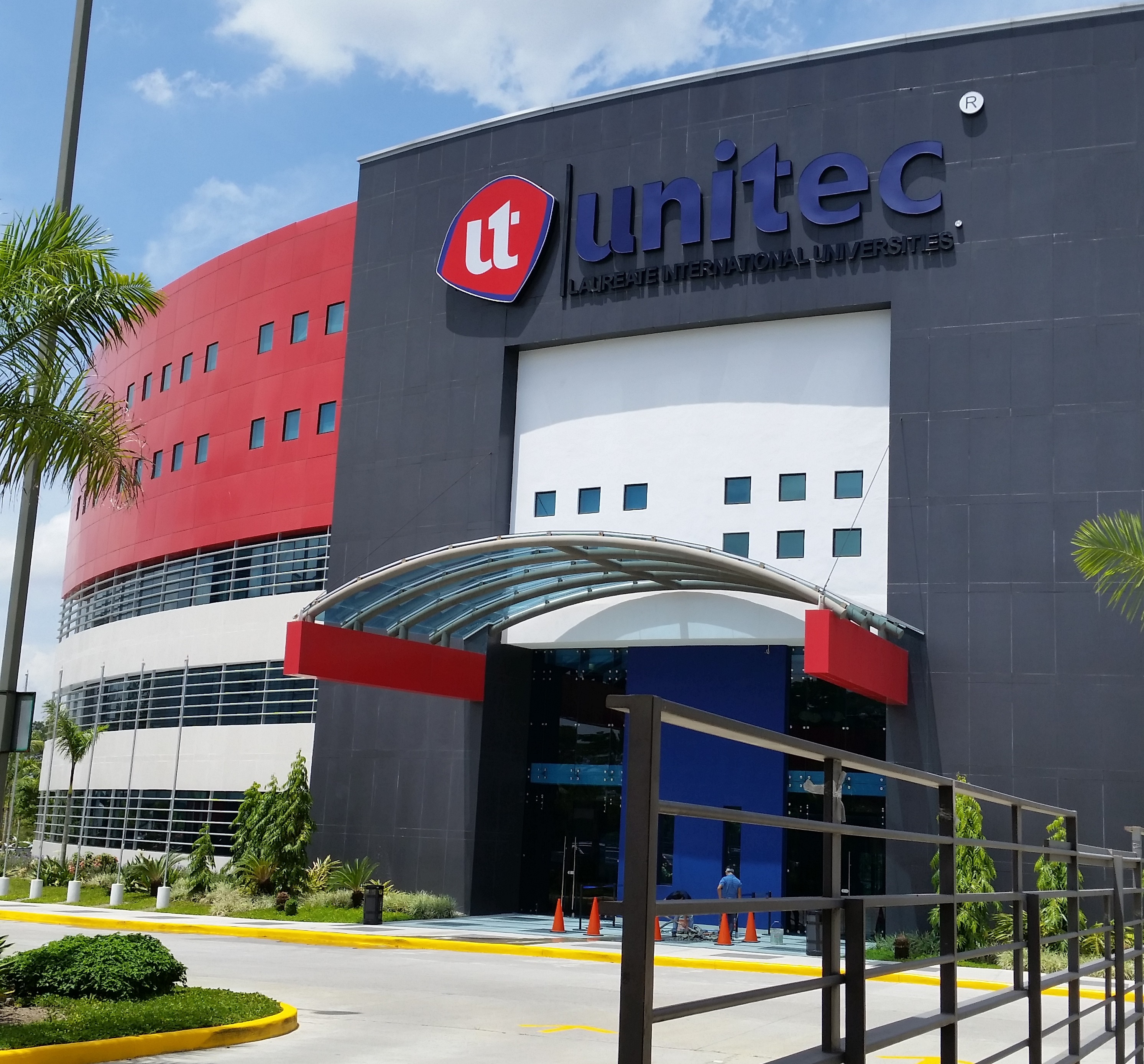
Universidad Tecnológica Centroamericana UNITEC

Just past the Universidad Nacional Autónoma de Honduras en el Valle de Sula, and spanning the Río Bermejo, is Colonia El Pedregal, which has residential high-rises.

Further out, north across the Río Bermejo, running to the edge of the city, and with calles (streets) renumbering from 1 up, are Colonia Los Alpes and Rancho El Coco and Residencial Los Cedros and Colonia La Tara.

Far to the north is Colonia Fesitranh.

=== Northeast ===
Barrio Las Acacias is just to the north of center. Nor-Este neighborhoods include Barrio San Cristobal, Villa Florencia, Colonia Ideal, Barrio Morazán, Colonia Modelo, and further out Colonia Bográn, Colonia El Carmen, and Colonia Los Laureles.

=== Southeast ===
Includes the road to the airport, Aeropuerto Internacional Ramon Villeda Morales and to the city of La Lima. Southeast neighborhoods include Barrio Medina (11 Calle SE to Avenida Juan Pablo II, 4 Avenida SO to 10 Avenida SE), Colonia La Aurora (defined by 7 Calle SE to 10 Calle SE, and 14 Avenida SE to Segundo Anilo (approximately where 18 Avenida would be), Barrio Cabañas, Barrio La Navidad, San Pedro, Barrio Las Palmas, Barrio San Luís, Colonia La Unión, Barrio La Paz. Farther out: Colonia Rivera Hernández, San Cristobal.

=== Chamelecón ===
With dateline giving San Pedro Sula as the location, the New York Times in 2014 described the Chamelecón district as a "warren of modest cement-block houses painted in now chipped and fading pastels", subject to pressure of street gangs. This is not the Colonia El Chamelecón neighborhood within San Pedro Sula, but rather it is the Chamelecón that lies outside to the south of San Pedro Sula, on the Chamelecón River.

=== Various ===
- Colonia Tara
- Colonia Jardines del valle
- Residencial Etahsa
- Residencial El Bordo
- Colonia Bellavista
- Colonia Cemcol
- Barrio el Guamilito
- Colonia El Roble
- Colonia Juan Lindo
- Colonia La Moderna
- Colonia Las Torres
- Colonia López Arellano
- Colonia Victoria
- Colonia Montefresco
- Barrio Santa Anita
- Barrio El Centro
- Colonia Las Mercedes
- Colonia Los Álamos
- Colonia La Veranda
- Colonia Los Cedros
- Colonia Los Cedritos
- Colonia Rodas Alvarado
- Barrio Barandillas
- Barrio Santa Ana
- Barrio Los Andes
- Barrio Concepción
- Barrio Suncery
- Residencial Los Álamos
- Residencial Juan Ramón Molina
- Colonia Villas del Carmen
- Residencial Villas Paraíso
- Villas Mackay
- Villas Matilda
- La Foresta
- Los Castaños
- Villas del Campo
- Merendon Hills
- Residencial Casa Maya
- Residencial Casa Maya 2
- Residencial Casa Maya 3
- Residencial Casa Maya 4
- Residencial Hebrón
- Residencial Canaán
- Residencial Fontana de la Arboleda
- Residencial Tribeca
- Colonia San José de Sula
- Colonia San Carlos de Sula
- Colonia Satélite
- Colonia Felipe Zelaya
- Colonia FESITRANH
- Colonia El Periodista
- Colonia Del Valle
- Colonia La Veranda
- Colonia COLVISULA

== Media ==
- El Anunciador de Cortés (1914—1919), independent weekly newspaper

== Sports ==
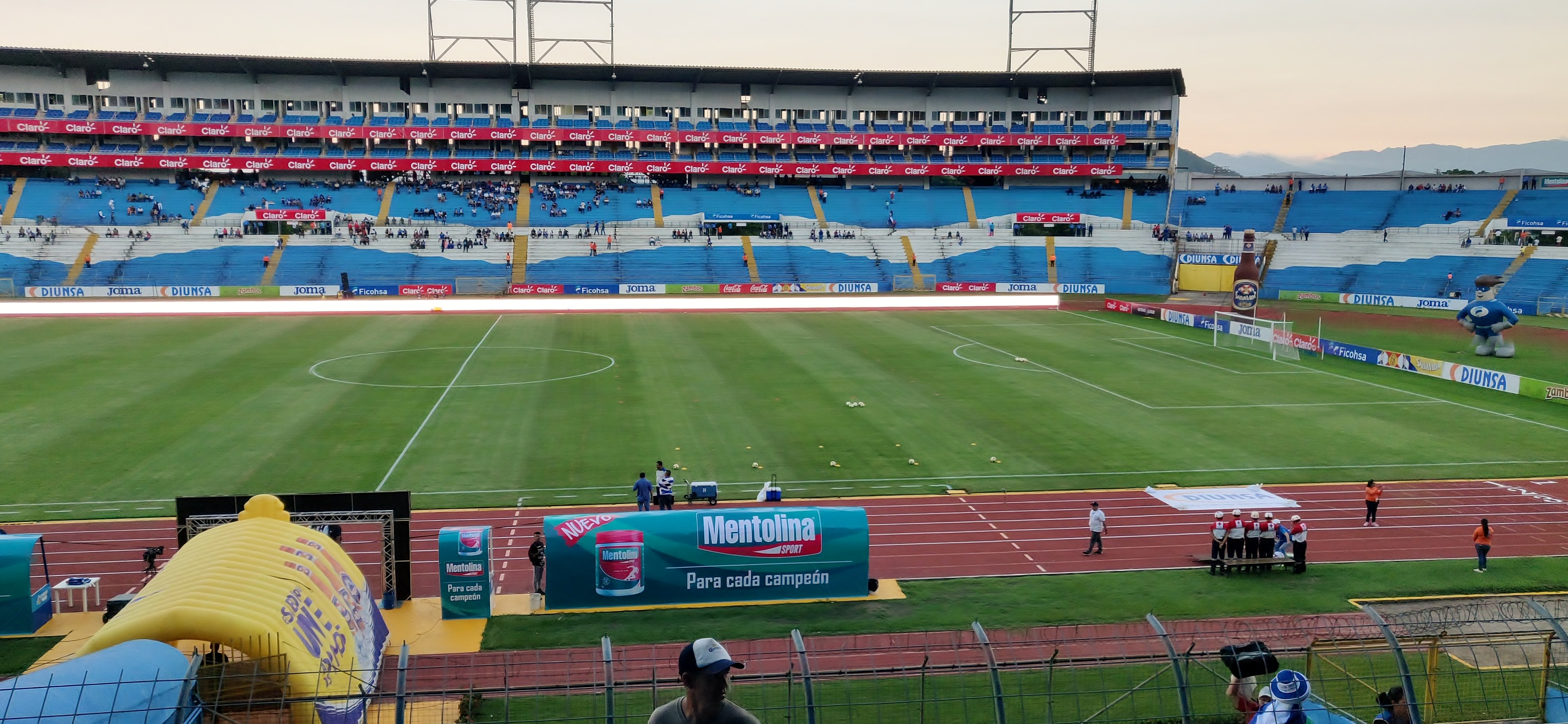
Estadio Olímpico Metropolitano

The Villa Olímpica is a multi-sporting complex that has facilities for most Olympic style games including football, boxing, swimming, baseball, cycling, and multipurpose gymnasiums.

San Pedro Sula is the only city in the country that houses to two football stadiums. The Estadio Olímpico Metropolitano is located in the Villa Olímpica and is the largest in the country with a capacity of 42,000. The Estadio Francisco Morazán is located in the center of the city and holds 23,000 people. The stadiums are home to San Pedro Sula's most popular professional football teams Marathón and Real CD España.

As of 2009, San Pedro Sula has been the home venue for Honduras national football team matches.

== Education ==
San Pedro Sula is home to several universities, including:

- Universidad Catolica de Honduras
- Universidad de San Pedro Sula
- Universidad Pedagogica Nacional Francisco Morazan
- Instituto Tecnologico Sampedrano
- Universidad Tecnologica de Honduras (UTH)
- Universidad Tecnologica Centroamericana (UNITEC)
- Instituto Tecnico de Electricidad y Electronica (ITEE)

== Tourism ==
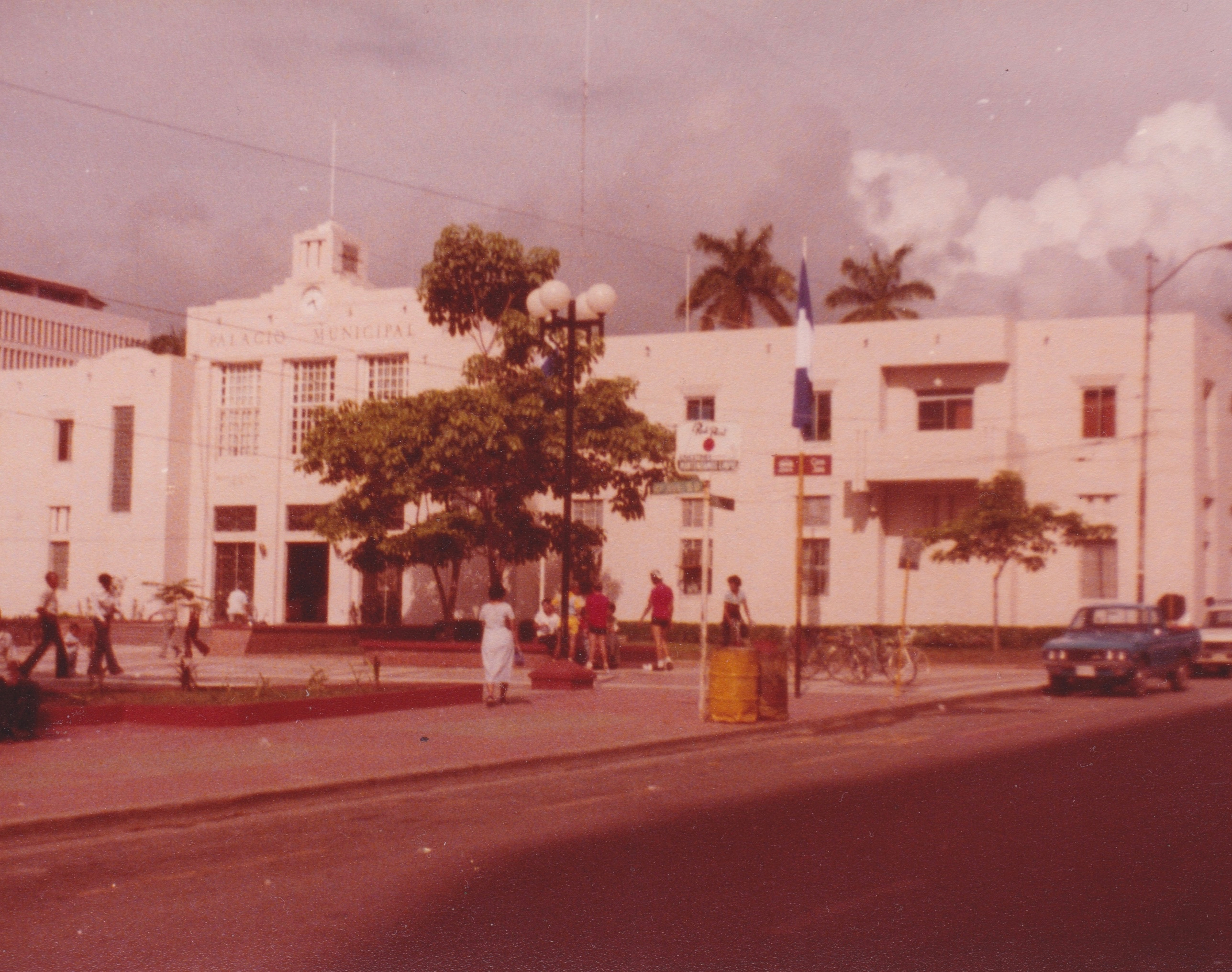
San Pedro Sula's municipal palace.

=== Cathedral ===
It has a Roman Catholic Cathedral that was built in 1949. as well as a Greek Orthodox cathedral, Iglesia Ortodoxa de Antioquía San Juan Bautista, built in 1963.

=== Currusté ===
This archeological site is two kilometers along the street that goes to Lake Jucutuma. Expeditions from 2006 found multiple pre-Columbian pieces, and ruins of an unknown civilization. The ruins are currently abandoned since 2009, it was reported that during Rodolfo Sunseri administration in 2006–2009 that he pretended to rescue the park with 4 million Lempiras, but the project never started.

== Transportation ==
The city is served by Ramón Villeda Morales International Airport, with passenger and cargo airline services to Panama, the United States, El Salvador, Mexico, Spain and other countries and domestic flights also.
