= St. John Baptist Cathedral, Penonomé =

St. John Baptist Cathedral
- Catedral de San Juan Bautista
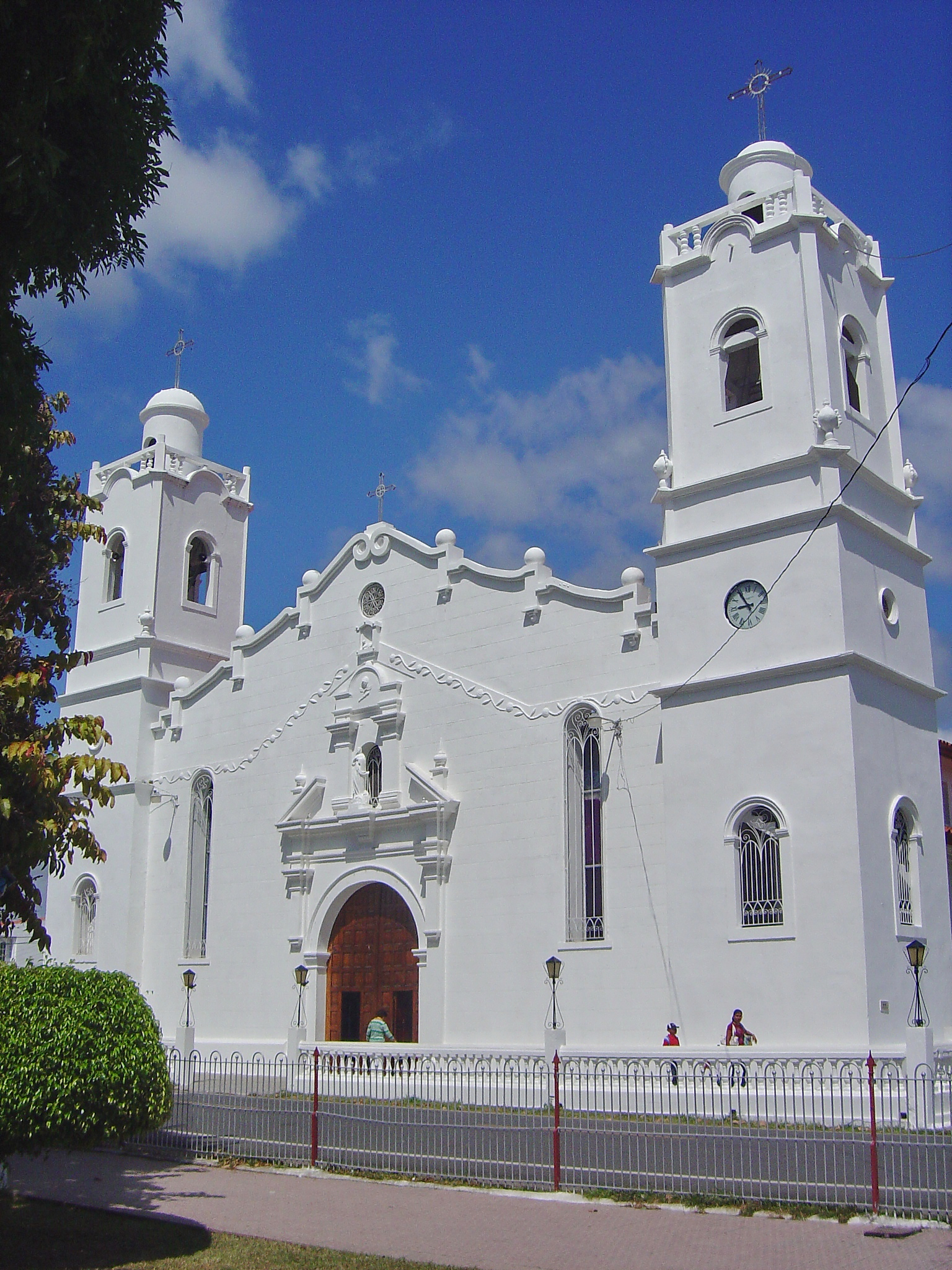
- St. John Baptist Cathedral
- Location: Penonomé
- Country: Panama
- Denomination: Roman Catholic Church

Architecture
- Architectural type: church

The St. John Baptist Cathedral (Spanish: Catedral de San Juan Bautista ) also called Penonomé Cathedral is a religious building that is affiliated with the Catholic Church and is located in the city of Penonomé in Cocle province in the Central American country of Panama.

Its history dates back to the mid-sixteenth century when it was built by the Spaniards in 1581 being the first mass was held in place. In 2013 it was temporarily closed for restoration work on the ceiling and altar and improvements in other areas such as security and electricity.

The temple follows the Roman or Latin rite and serves as the principal church of the Diocese of Penonomé (Dioecesis Poenonomensis) which was created in 1993 by the Bull "Quo aptius" of Pope John Paul II.

The church is under the pastoral responsibility of the Bishop Edgardo Muñoz Cedeño.

== See also ==
- Roman Catholicism in Panama
