= Ciudad Altamirano Cathedral =

Catholic cathedral in Ciudad Altamirano, Mexico

Coordinates: 18.3625°N 100.6670°W

St. John the Baptist Cathedral
- Catedral de San Juan Bautista
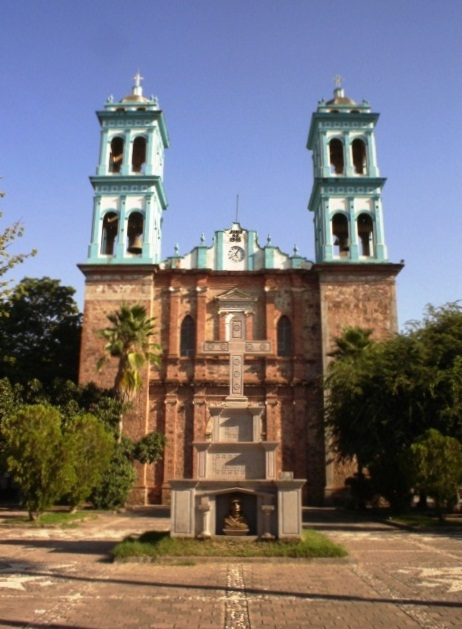
- St. John the Baptist Cathedral
- Location: Ciudad Altamirano
- Country: Mexico
- Denomination: Catholic Church

Administration
- Diocese: Diocese of Ciudad Altamirano

The St. John the Baptist Cathedral (Spanish: Catedral de San Juan Bautista) also Ciudad Altamirano Cathedral is a cathedral of the Catholic Church located in Ciudad Altamirano, Guerrero, Mexico, and is considered one of the most important religious monuments in the state built during the sixteenth century.

It serves as the mother church of the Diocese of Ciudad Altamirano (Diocese Civitatis Altamirensis), created by Pope Paul VI in 1964 through the bull "Populo Dei". It is under the pastoral responsibility of Bishop Maximino Martínez Miranda.

== See also ==
- Roman Catholicism in Mexico
- St. John the Baptist

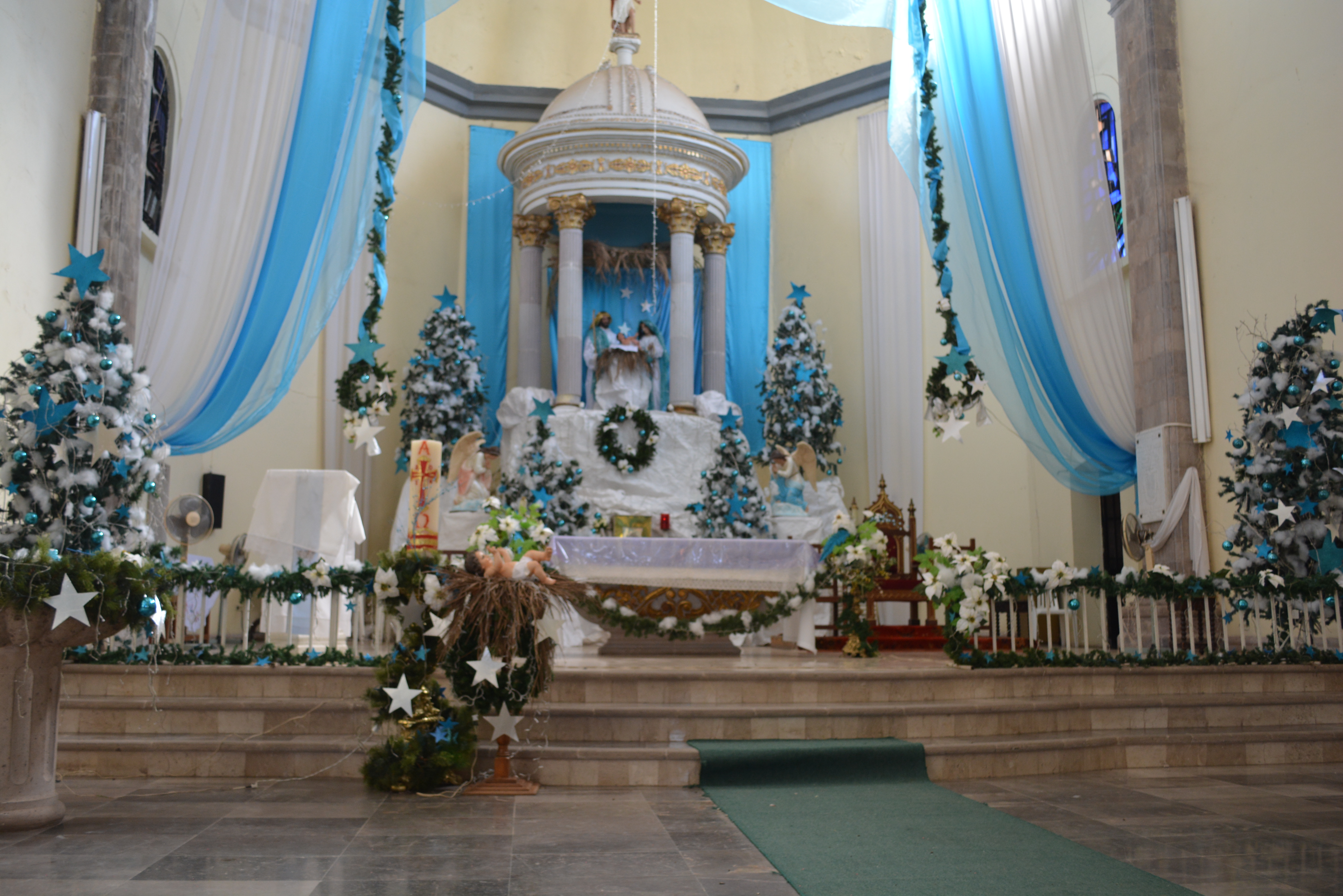
Internal view
