= Chachapoyas Cathedral =

Coordinates: 6.2300°S 77.8727°W

St. John the Baptist Cathedral
- Catedral de San Juan Bautista
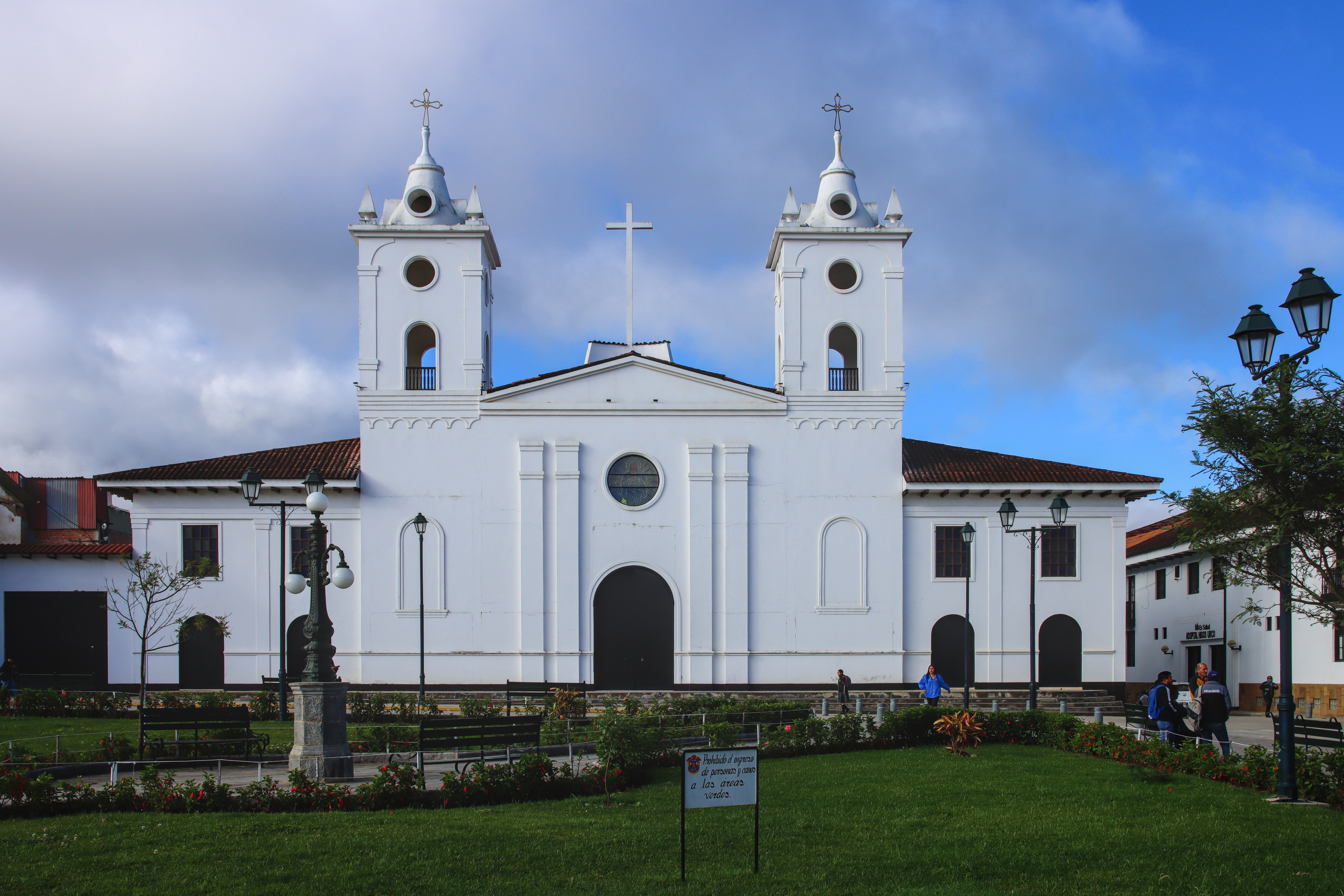
- St. John the Baptist Cathedral
- Location: Chachapoyas
- Country: Peru
- Denomination: Roman Catholic Church

The Cathedral of St. John the Baptist in Chachapoyas (Spanish: Catedral de San Juan Bautista ), also called Chachapoyas Cathedral, is a parish of the Catholic Church and seat of the Diocese of Chachapoyas. The cathedral church is located on the main square of the city of Chachapoyas, the capital of the Department of Amazonas, Peru. It is under the pastoral responsibility of Bishop Emiliano Antonio Cisneros Martínez.

The settlement was founded in 1538. It was elevated to cathedral status with the erection of the Diocese of Chachapoyas on June 2, 1843, split from the diocese of Maynas by the bull "Ex Sublimi Petri" of Pope Gregory XVI.

The old building was rebuilt in 1928 after an earthquake and then modernized in the 1970s, but was remodeled once again in 2010 giving it back its original style.

== See also ==
- Catholic Church in Peru

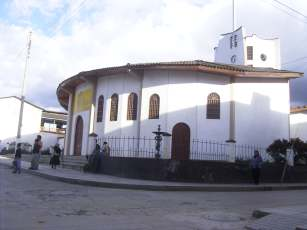
The old cathedral in 2005
