= St. John the Baptist Cathedral, Calama =

Coordinates: 22.4623°S 68.9276°W

St. John the Baptist Cathedral
- Catedral de San Juan Bautista de Calama
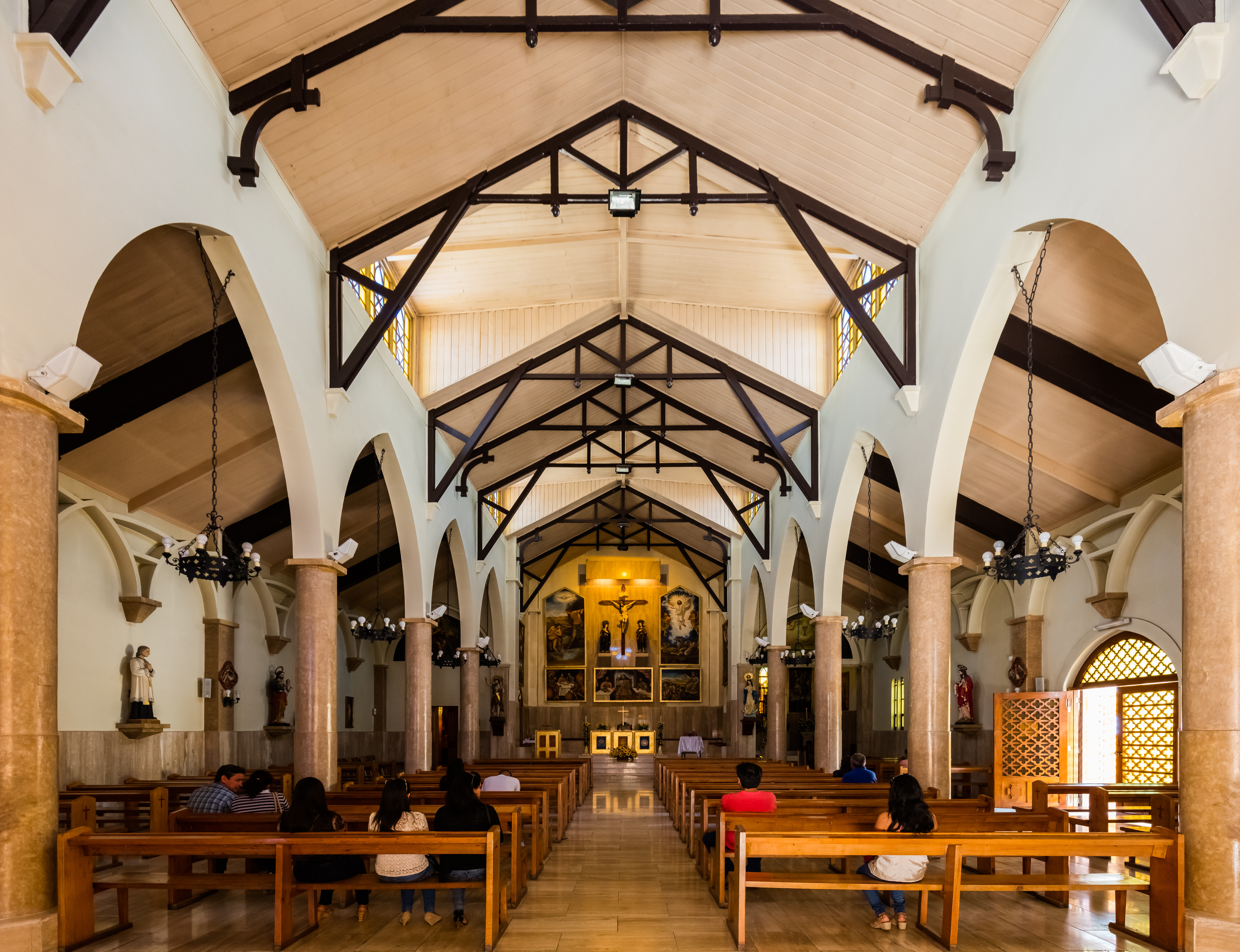
- St. John the Baptist Cathedral
- Location: Calama
- Country: Chile
- Denomination: Roman Catholic Church

The St. John the Baptist Cathedral (Spanish: Catedral de San Juan Bautista de Calama) Also Calama Cathedral Is the main Catholic church of the Diocese of San Juan Bautista de Calama, in Chile. It is located in the heart of the city, in front of the plaza 23 de Marzo, and was erected by the Bishop of Antofagasta Monsignor Luis Silva Lezaeta in the year 1906.

In 2000 its roof was changed, being covered with sheets of copper extracted and processed in Chuquicamata, while its tower was lined with the same material of the mine Radomiro Tomic. The Cathedral was consecrated by Monsignor Cristián Contreras Molina the 11 of November 2001.

== See also ==
- Roman Catholicism in Chile
- St. John the Baptist
