= St. John the Baptist Cathedral, Trujillo =

St. John the Baptist Cathedral
- Catedral de San Juan Bautista
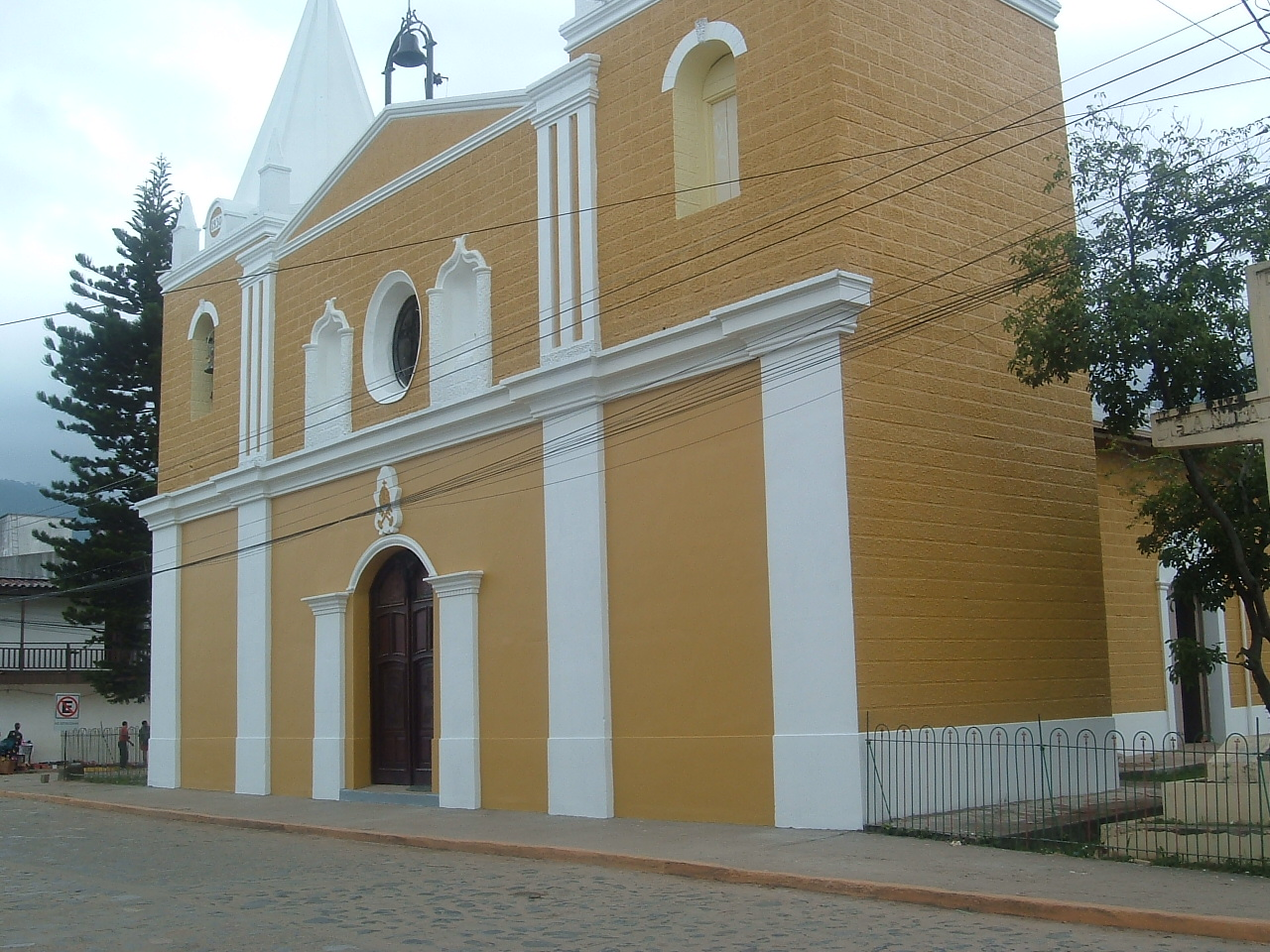
- St. John the Baptist Cathedral
- Location: Trujillo
- Country: Honduras
- Denomination: Roman Catholic Church

Architecture
- Architectural type: church

Administration
- Diocese: Roman Catholic Diocese of Trujillo (Honduras)

The St. John the Baptist Cathedral, (Spanish: Catedral de San Juan Bautista) or Trujillo Cathedral, is a Catholic church located in the northern city of Trujillo, Colón, Honduras. It should not be confused with Catholic cathedrals of other cities with the same name in Trujillo, Peru (St. Mary's Cathedral) and Trujillo, Venezuela (Cathedral of Our Lady of Peace).

The cathedral follows the Roman or Latin rite and is the main church of the Diocese of Trujillo in Honduras (Dioecesis Truxillensis in Honduria) that was created in 1987 through the bull "Pro Supremi" of Pope John Paul II.

It highlights its clock bought in the United States in 1888 and brought from Spain in 1889. The church was completely restored in 2011.

It is under the pastoral responsibility of Bishop Luis Felipe Solé Fa.

== See also ==
- List of cathedrals in Honduras
- Roman Catholicism in Honduras
- St. John the Baptist

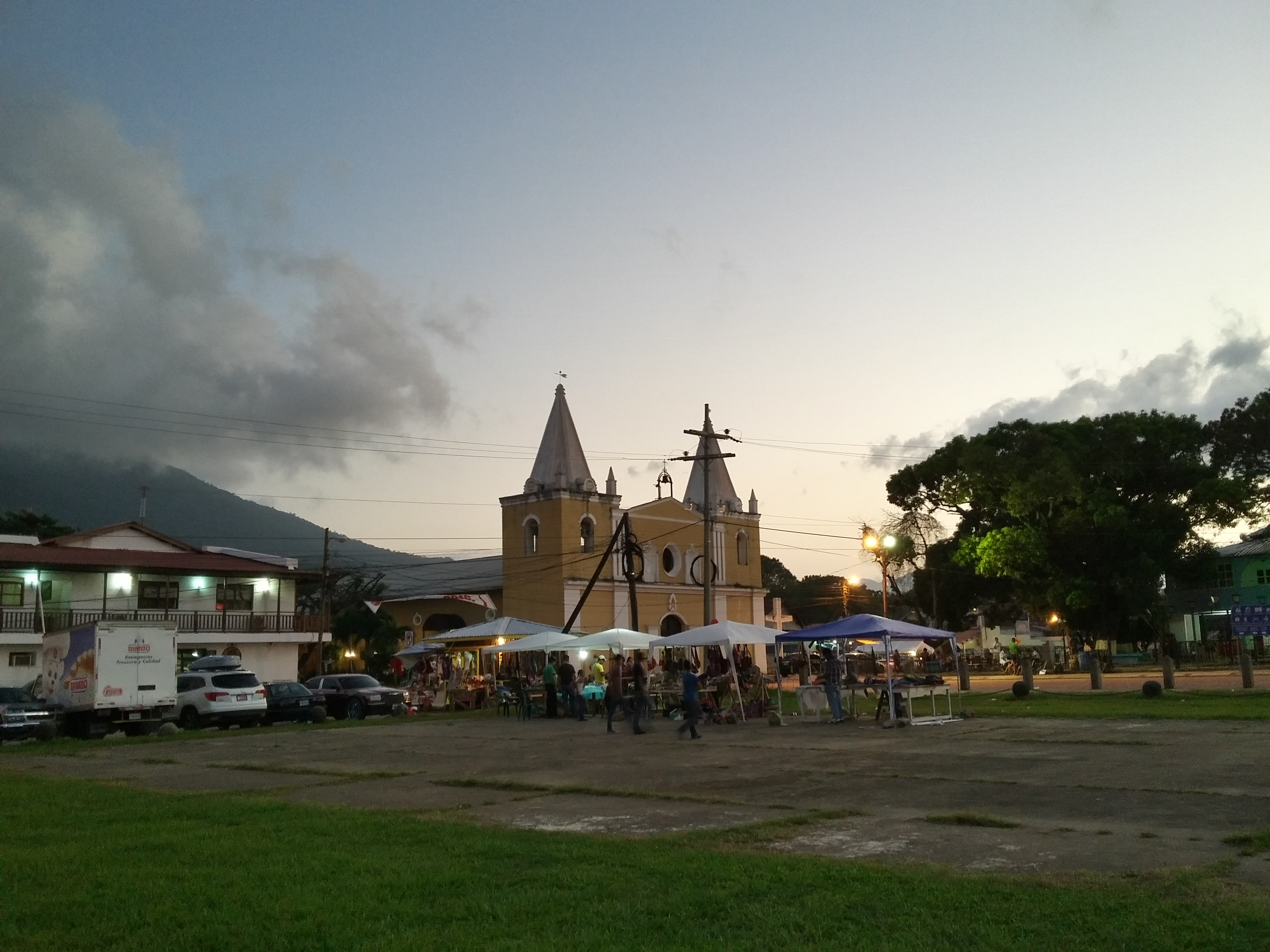
Another View
