= Kalibo Cathedral =

Roman Catholic church in Aklan, Philippines

- Cathedral Parish of Saint John the Baptist
- Diocesan Shrine of the Santo Niño de Kalibo
- Parokya Katedral it San Juan Bautista (Aklan); Parroquia Catedral de San Juan el Bautista (Spanish)
- Cathedral façade in 2022

- Location in the Visayas Location in the Philippines
- 11°42′37″N 122°21′49″E
- Location: Kalibo, Aklan
- Country: Philippines
- Denomination: Roman Catholic

History
- Status: Cathedral, Shrine
- Founded: 1581, 1680, 1804
- Dedication: John the Baptist
- Consecrated: 1804; 222 years ago

Architecture
- Functional status: Active
- Architectural type: Church building
- Style: Baroque, Modern
- Completed: 1804, 1886, 1947
- Demolished: 1885, 1990

Administration
- Province: Capiz
- Metropolis: Capiz
- Diocese: Kalibo

Clergy
- Bishop: Cyril Villareal

The Cathedral Parish of Saint John the Baptist, also known as the Diocesan Shrine of the Santo Niño de Kalibo, more commonly known as the Kalibo Cathedral, is a Roman Catholic cathedral in downtown Kalibo, Aklan, Philippines. The cathedral is the seat of the Diocese of Kalibo, and is situated near the Aklan River.

== History ==
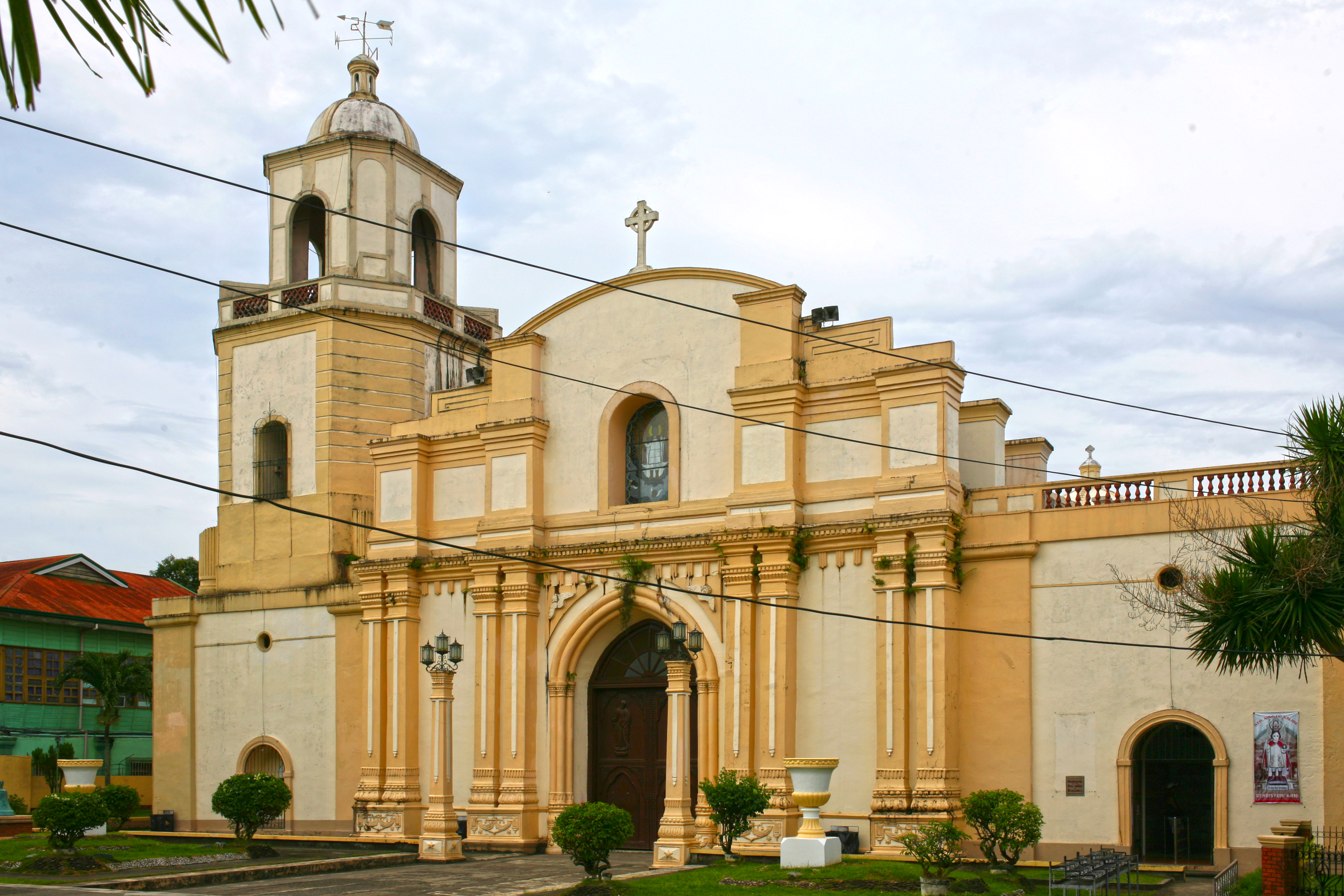
The cathedral in 2013 with orange painted pilasters

The cathedral stands as the oldest edifice of worship in the province of Aklan. The mission in Kalibo was founded by the Augustinians in 1581. Saint John the Baptist was chosen as the patron saint when the Kalibo mission was promoted into a parish in 1680. The town site then was at Barrio Laguinbanua in Numancia, 2 kilometres (1 mile) away from the Kalibo present site.

A church was constructed in Laguinbanua but when the town transferred site to its present location in 1804, another church was erected which is the cathedral at present. In 1826, both the church and convent were completed. On May 24, 1885, a massive fire razed the town including the convent which was reconstructed the following year, 1886.

Cathedral interior in 2022

In 1947, after the World War II, Gabriel M. Reyes, Archbishop of Cebu and later of Manila, personally took a hand in the church reconstruction and remodeling. In 1976, the parish church of Kalibo elevated into a cathedral when the Diocese of Kalibo was erected. On June 14, 1990, an intensity 7.1 earthquake hit Panay Island at 3:41 P.M. with the epicenter at Culasi. The cathedral that is made of bricks suffered cracks on its walls. Then Kalibo Bishop Gabriel V. Reyes, restored and improved the church to accommodate more pilgrims who come to celebrate the feast of the Santo Niño.

Retaining some of the lines characteristic of the post-war church that alludes to earlier church styles, the cathedral of Kalibo is of modern construction. Its architectural design was crafted by the renowned national artist Leandro V. Locsin. Though the principal patron and titular of Kalibo is John the Baptist, the center of attention in this church is the image of the Santo Niño, in whose honor the annual Ati-atihan is celebrated every January.
