= Spark Bridge =

Village in Cumbria, England

Coordinates: 54.255°N 3.066°W

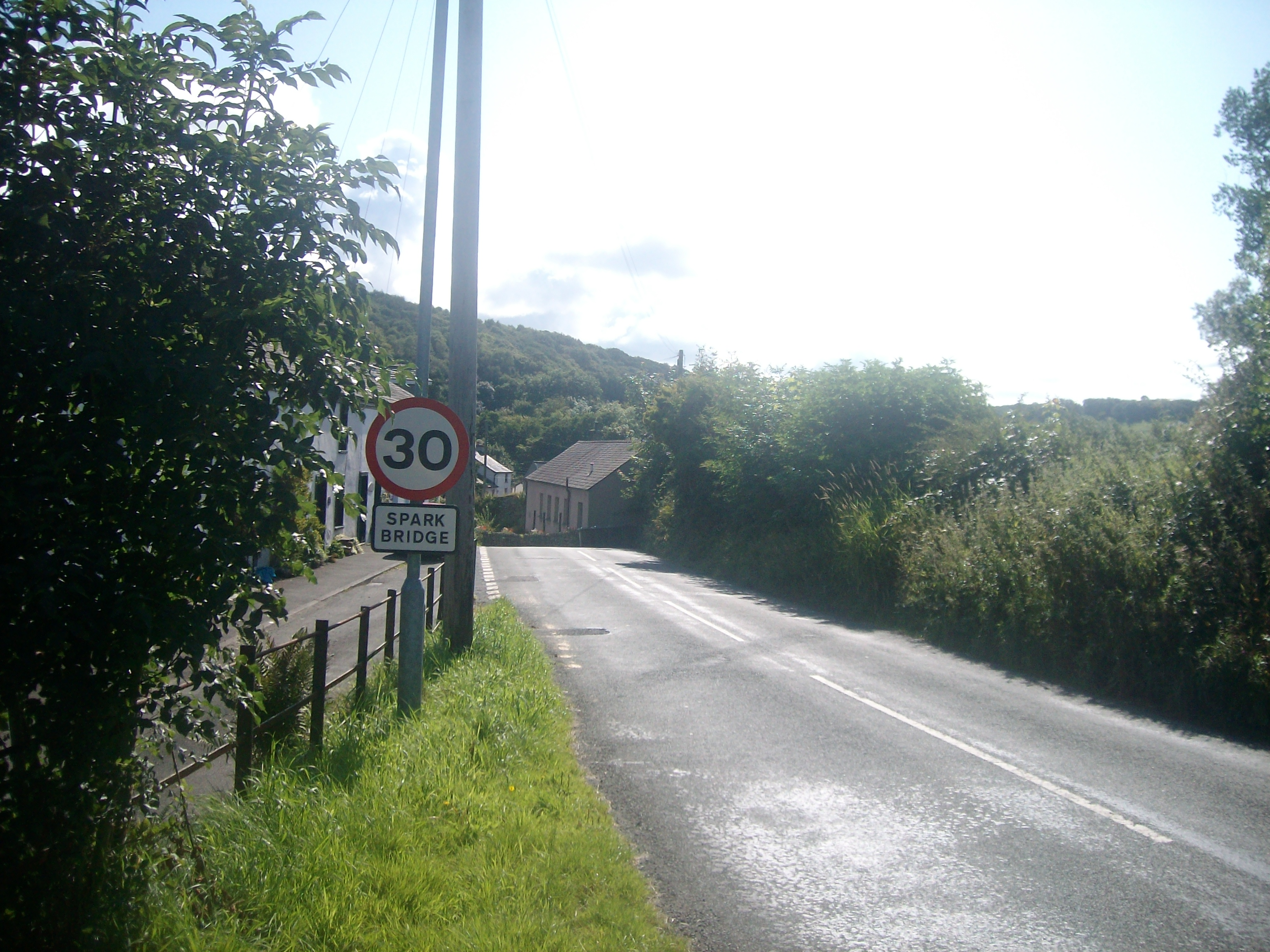
- Road into Spark Bridge from the north

- Location in South Lakeland Location within Cumbria
- OS grid reference: SD305849
- Civil parish: Egton with Newland
- Unitary authority: Westmorland and Furness
- Ceremonial county: Cumbria
- Region: North West
- Country: England
- Sovereign state: United Kingdom
- Post town: ULVERSTON
- Postcode district: LA12
- Dialling code: 01229
- Police: Cumbria
- Fire: Cumbria
- Ambulance: North West
- UK Parliament: Barrow and Furness; Westmorland and Lonsdale

Spark Bridge is a village in the Westmorland and Furness district, in Cumbria, England, within the Lake District National Park, and within the historic boundaries of Lancashire. The former mill village is situated away from the main road on the River Crake which flows from Coniston Water to Morecambe Bay at Greenodd. The village green which is next to and gives access to the river is in the middle of the village surrounded by well maintained white painted cottages.

Most of the village is in the civil parish of Egton with Newland, which has a joint parish council with Mansriggs and Osmotherley; an area including the Farmer's Arms pub is in the adjacent parish of Lowick, to the north, and the area east of the River Crake is in the parish of Colton.

== History ==
Spark Bridge bobbin mill, using power from the river, employed 60 people in the 1857, at which time it produced "1800 gross" (i.e. 1800x144 =259,200) bobbins per week. The mill diversified after the cotton industry declined, and was active for much of the 20th century.

== Facilities ==
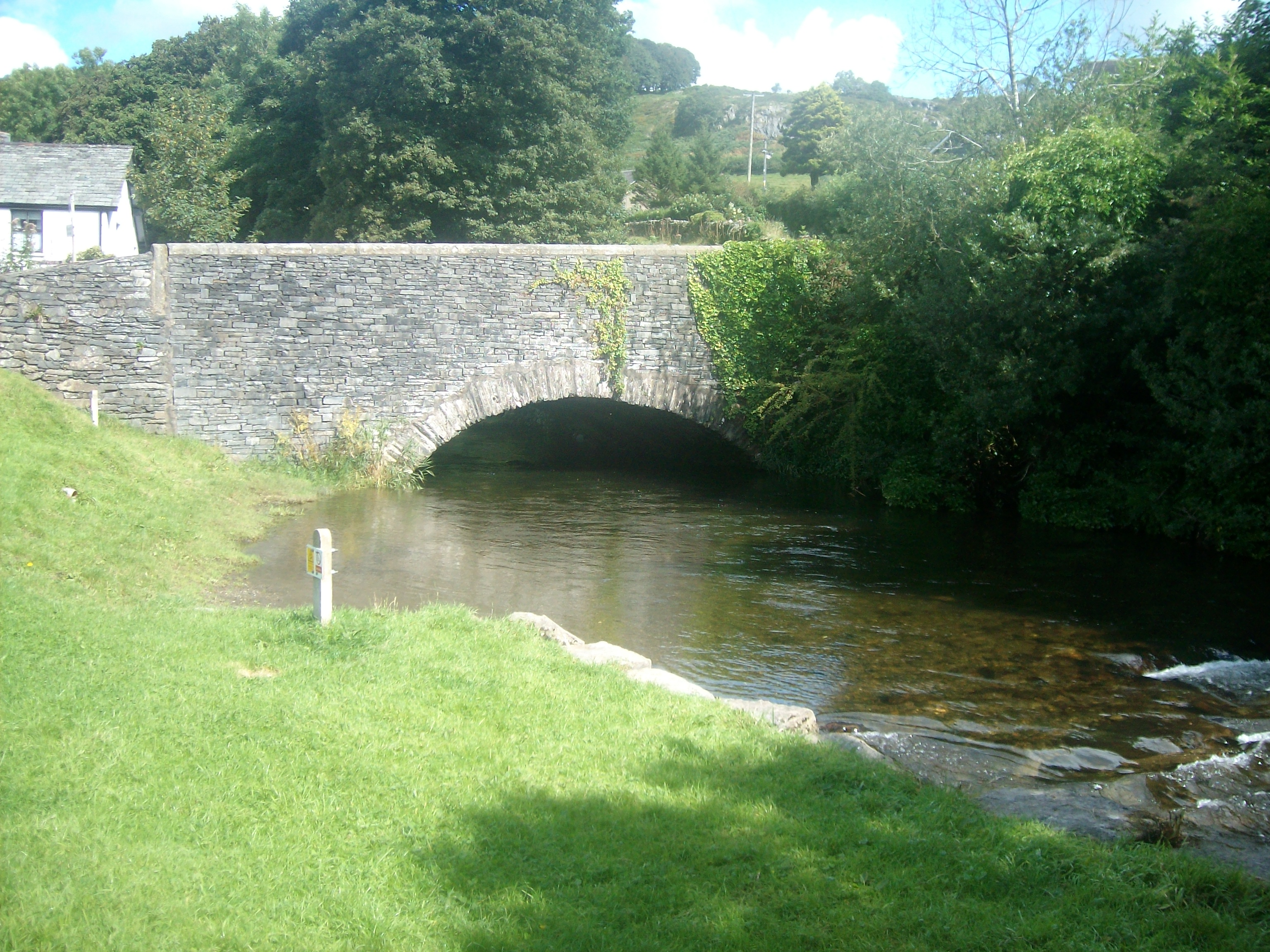
The River Crake passing through Spark Bridge

There are two public houses, The Royal Oak Inn at the centre of the village, and The Farmers Arms, a listed building rescued in 2021 by local arts charity Grizedale Arts, supported by loan stock investors and local and international donors. The diversified pub now offers crafts classes, talks and events and a holiday apartment as well as a bar, restaurant, cafe and outdoor pizza oven. The village also has its own postbox, a telephone box and a bus stop. The bus X 12 runs Monday to Saturday to Coniston or in the other direction to Ulverston and Barrow in Furness.

Canoeists use the village green to leave the river at this point, often using the nearby village hall as a base.

== River Crake ==
The River Crake passes from Coniston Water four miles away through Spark Bridge en route to the Leven Estuary.

In November 2009 many of the tributaries feeding the River Crake overflowed, feeding water on the local road network. It was described as a once in a thousand-year flooding event by the Environment Agency. Cumbria Police closed the main bridge on Thursday night around 7 p.m. to all on foot and in cars, they feared that the damage could have been caused to the bridge but a later examination showed that it was undamaged.
