= Ulverston =

Town in Cumbria, England

Coordinates: 54.193°N 3.090°W

- Market town and parish
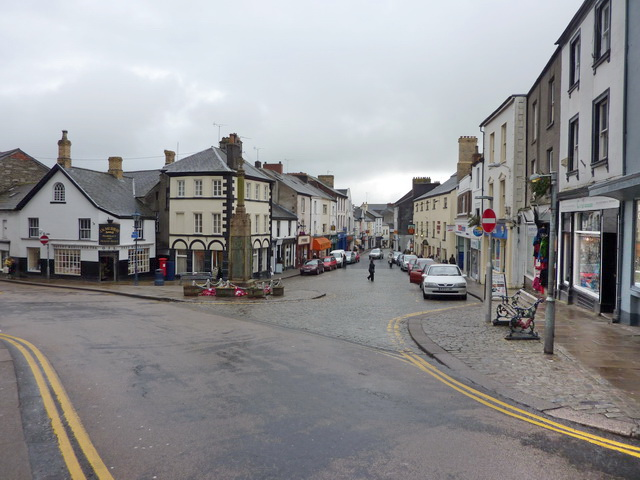
- Market Street

- Location on Morecambe Bay Location in the former South Lakeland district Location within Cumbria
- Population: 11,823 (2021 Census)
- Demonym: Ulverstonian
- OS grid reference: SD288783
- Civil parish: Ulverston
- Unitary authority: Westmorland and Furness
- Ceremonial county: Cumbria
- Region: North West
- Country: England
- Sovereign state: United Kingdom
- Post town: ULVERSTON
- Postcode district: LA12
- Dialling code: 01229
- Police: Cumbria
- Fire: Cumbria
- Ambulance: North West
- UK Parliament: Barrow and Furness

Ulverston is a market town and civil parish in Westmorland and Furness, Cumbria, England. Historically in Lancashire, it lies a few miles south of the Lake District National Park and just north-west of Morecambe Bay, within the Furness Peninsula. Lancaster is 39 miles (63 km) to the east, Barrow-in-Furness 10 miles (16 km) to the south-west and Kendal 25 miles (40 km) to the north-east. In the 2011 census the parish had a population of 11,678, increasing at the 2021 census to 11,823.

== History ==
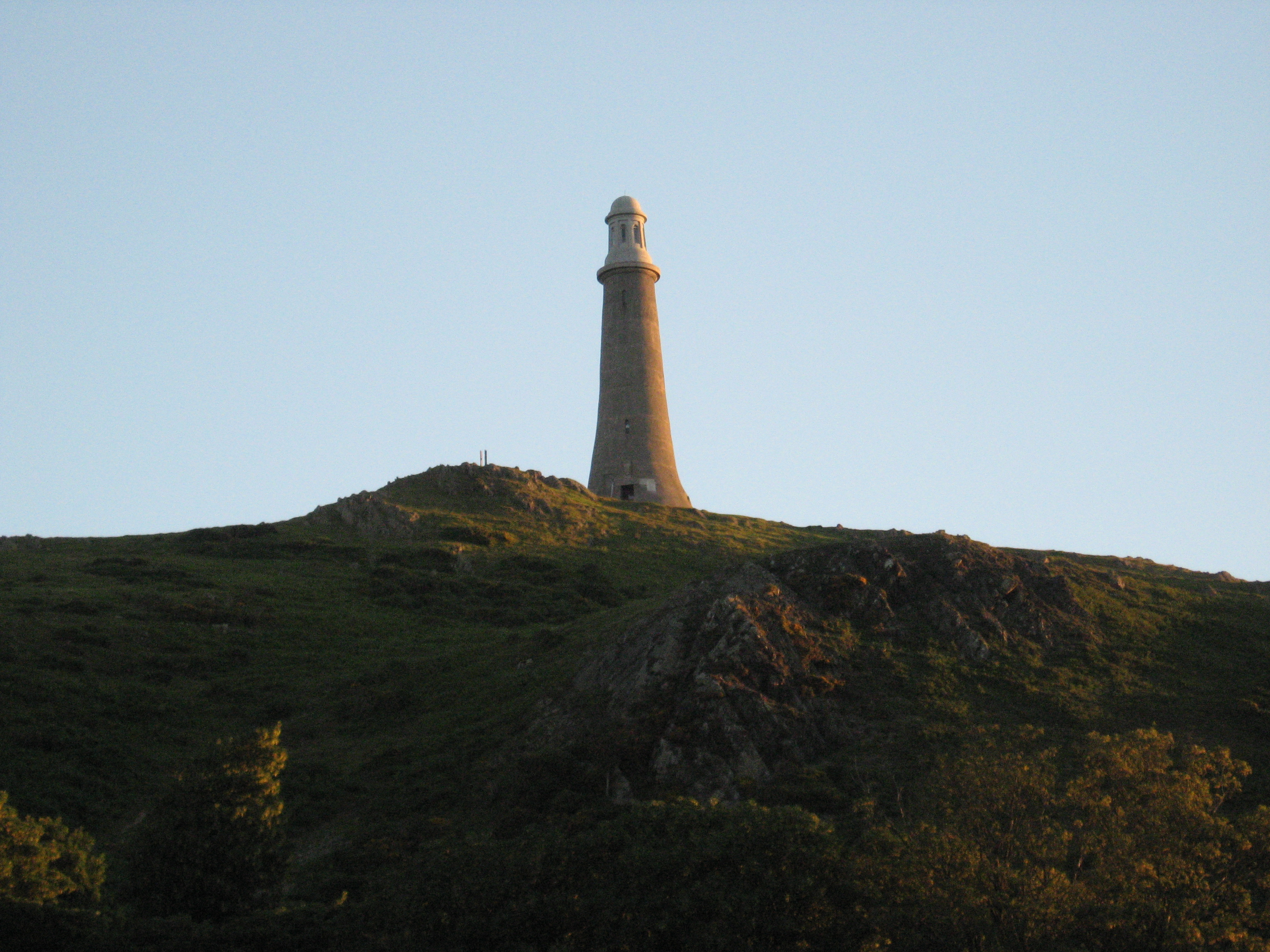
Hoad Hill and the Hoad Monument, a near replica of the third Eddystone Lighthouse

The name Ulverston, first noted as Ulurestun in the Domesday Book of 1086, consists of an Old Norse personal name, Úlfarr, or the Old English Wulfhere, with the Old English tūn, meaning farmstead or village. The personal names Úlfarr and Wulfhere both imply "wolf warrior" or "wolf army", which explains the presence of a wolf on the town's coat of arms. The loss of the initial W in Wulfhere can be linked to Scandinavian influence in the region. Locally, the town has traditionally been known as Oostan. Other variants include Oluestonam (1127), and Uluereston (1189). The name was spelled "Ulverstone" until at least 1888.

The market charter granted in 1280 by Edward I was for a market on Thursdays. The town retains its market-town appearance; market days are now Thursdays and Saturdays. The charter also allowed public houses to open from 10:30 am to 11:00 pm, regardless of other statute on the books. The present Saturday market includes in the summer craft stalls, charity stalls and locally produced ware on "Made in Cumbria" stalls.

The parish church is a listed building and was founded in the 12th century. Historically, the parish included chapelries and townships that later became separate civil parishes: Blawith, Church Coniston, Egton with Newland, Lowick, Mansriggs, Osmotherley, Subberthwaite and Torver. From 1894 to 1974 the town served as an urban district in the administrative county of Lancashire. Under the Local Government Act 1972 it became a successor parish in the Cumbria district of South Lakeland.

Town Bank Grammar School was founded in 1658 from a benefaction by Thomas Fell. The Victoria Road drill hall opened in 1873.

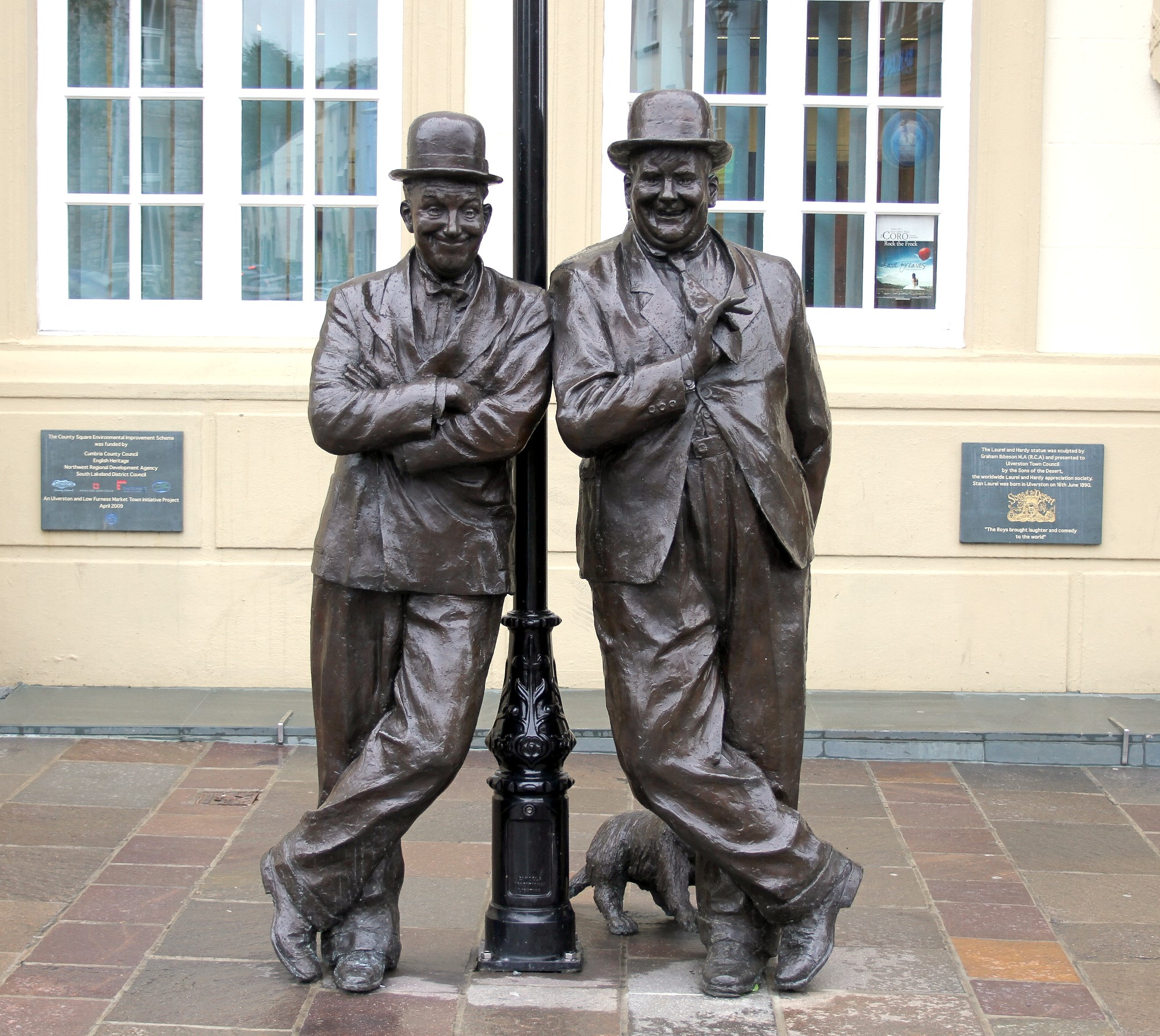
Stan Laurel and Oliver Hardy statue; Stan Laurel was born in Ulverston in 1890, and named Arthur Jefferson.

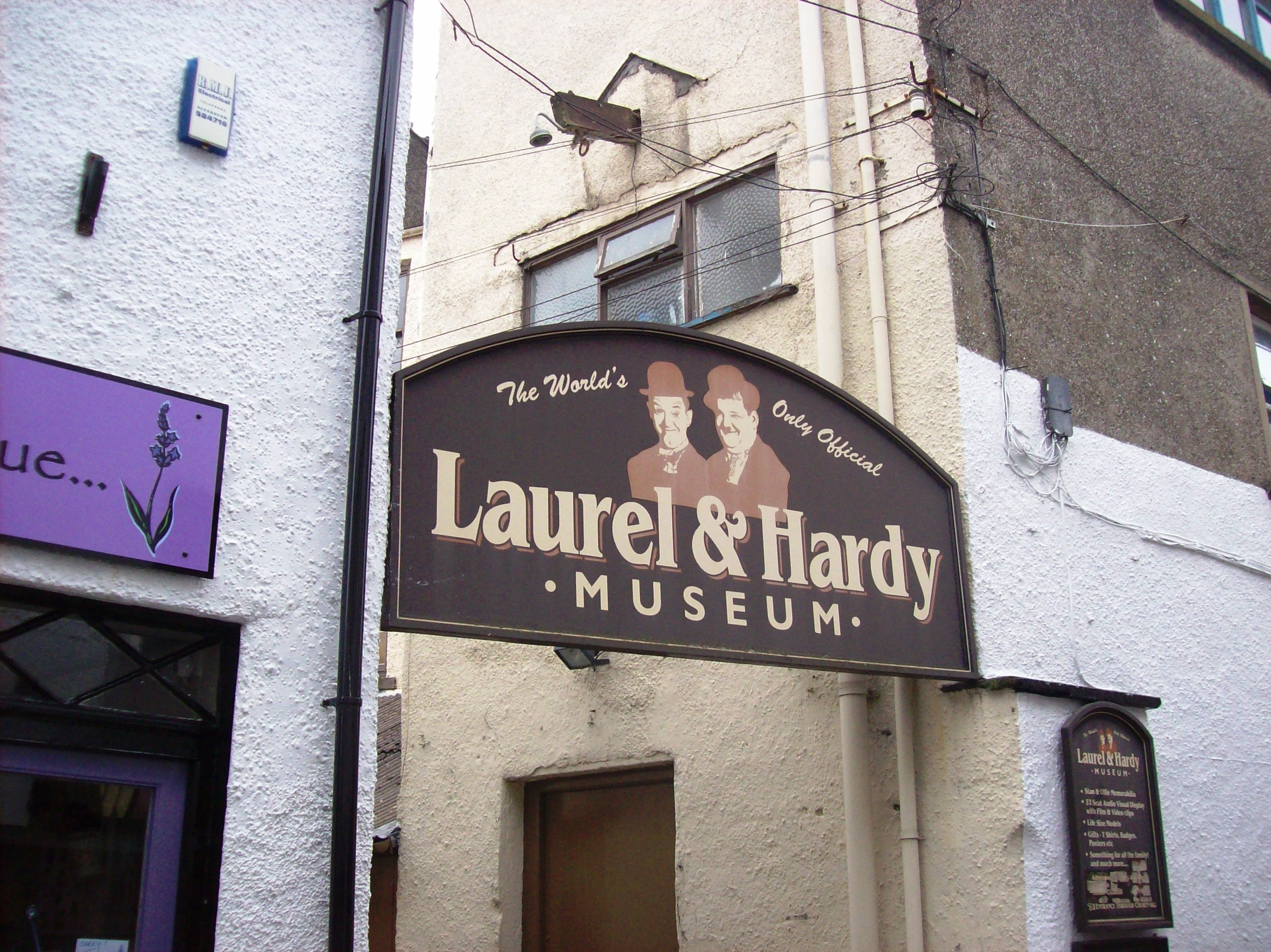
Laurel and Hardy Museum

The High Carley Hospital and Ulverston Joint Hospital Board built an infectious disease hospital at High Carley, Pennington, in 1884. It was initially a fever hospital for paupers. In 1916 a second hospital, run by Lancashire County Council, was built to treat tubercular patients. From 1949 a children's annexe was built. In the 1950s, as the number of tubercular patients decreased, the hospital was run as an acute hospital. In 1984, after the building of the new Furness General Hospital, High Carley was closed.

In 2009, the comedian Ken Dodd unveiled a statue of Laurel and Hardy (by Graham Ibbeson) outside Coronation Hall in the town centre.

=== Earthquake ===
On 28 April 2009, Ulverston was near the epicentre of an earthquake measuring 3.7 on the Richter magnitude scale. Tremors were felt across south Cumbria and parts of north Lancashire at 11.22, but virtually no damage was caused. A spokesman for the British Geological Survey stated that earthquakes of such magnitude occur roughly once a year in Britain. Regionally, it was the strongest seismic event since a magnitude 4.4 earthquake struck Lancaster in 1835.

== Governance ==
Ulverston falls within the Westmorland and Furness unitary authority area in the ceremonial county of Cumbria. Until 2023 it was within South Lakeland District. Ulverston Town Council covers some parochial matters.

The town is in the wider civil parish of Ulverston. This is bounded in the east by the Leven estuary, the River Crake, Coniston Water and Yewdale Beck. To the west the boundary follows a chain of hills, and beyond lie the towns of Kirkby-in-Furness and Askam and Ireleth. To the south is relatively low land that rises quickly. In the north are hills such as Coniston Old Man. The parish settlements are mainly in the eastern part.

== Places of interest ==
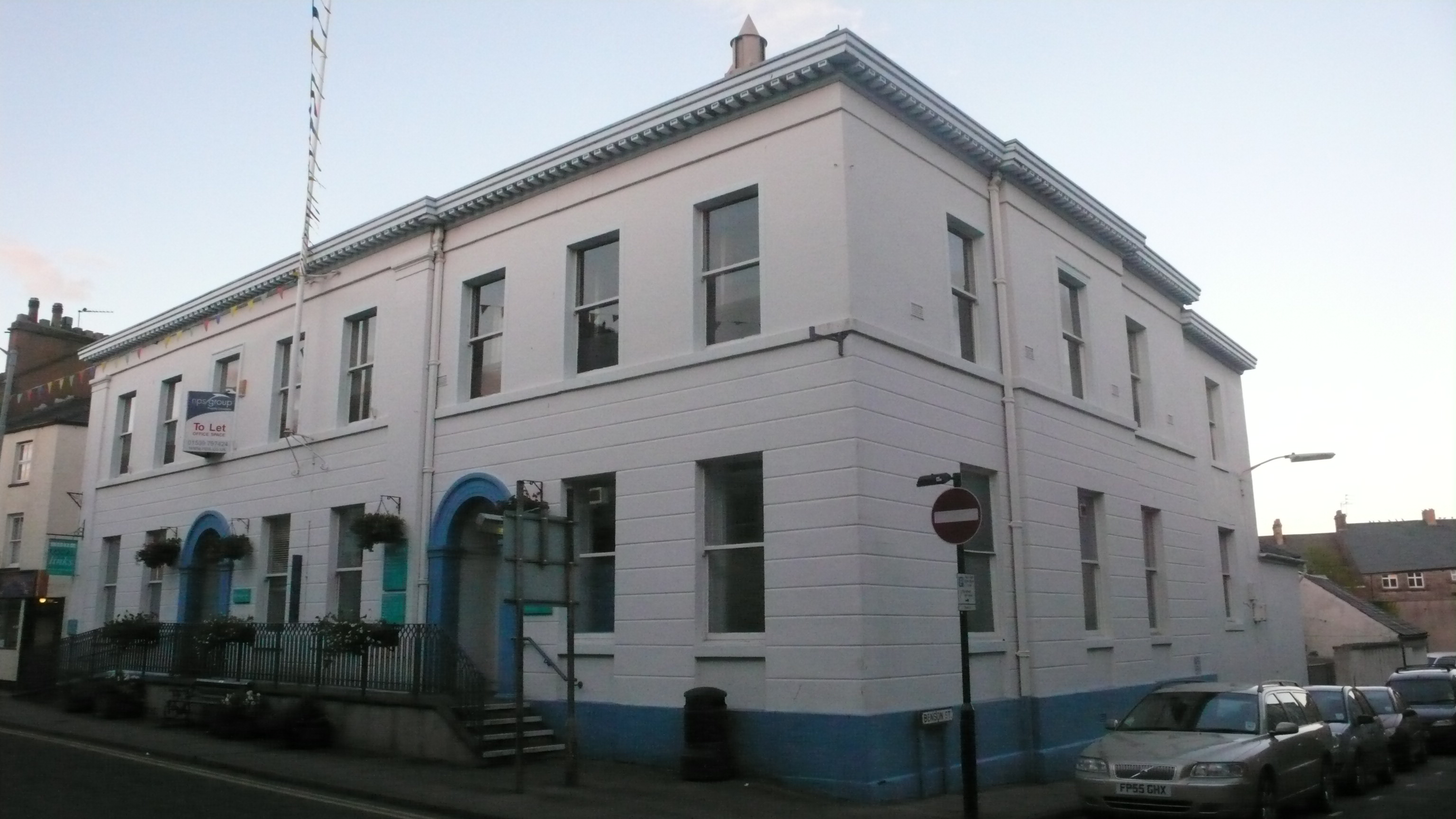
Ulverston Town Hall

The Laurel & Hardy Museum is situated in Ulverston. This is because Stan Laurel was born in Ulverston in 1890 and later became famous because of films made in the USA with Oliver Hardy.

The limestone Hoad Monument (proper name: the Sir John Barrow Monument), which offers views that include Morecambe Bay and parts of the Lake District, was built in 1850 in honour of the statesman Sir John Barrow.

Ulverston Town Hall was completed in 1825.

The Roxy Cinema opened on 21 June 1937 with 'Rose Marie' starring Nelson Eddy and Jeanette Macdonald. It was designed by Drury and Gomersall for the James Brennan circuit.

The Victoria Concert Hall (now premises of Emmanuel Christian Centre) opened in 1850 as an opera and dance hall. It is now a Grade II listed building. In 1909 it became Ulverston's first cinema and was formerly the location of the County Court sessions. It served various religious uses until being refurbished in 1986 by Ulverston's oldest evangelical community to open as Emmanuel Christian Centre.

== Education ==
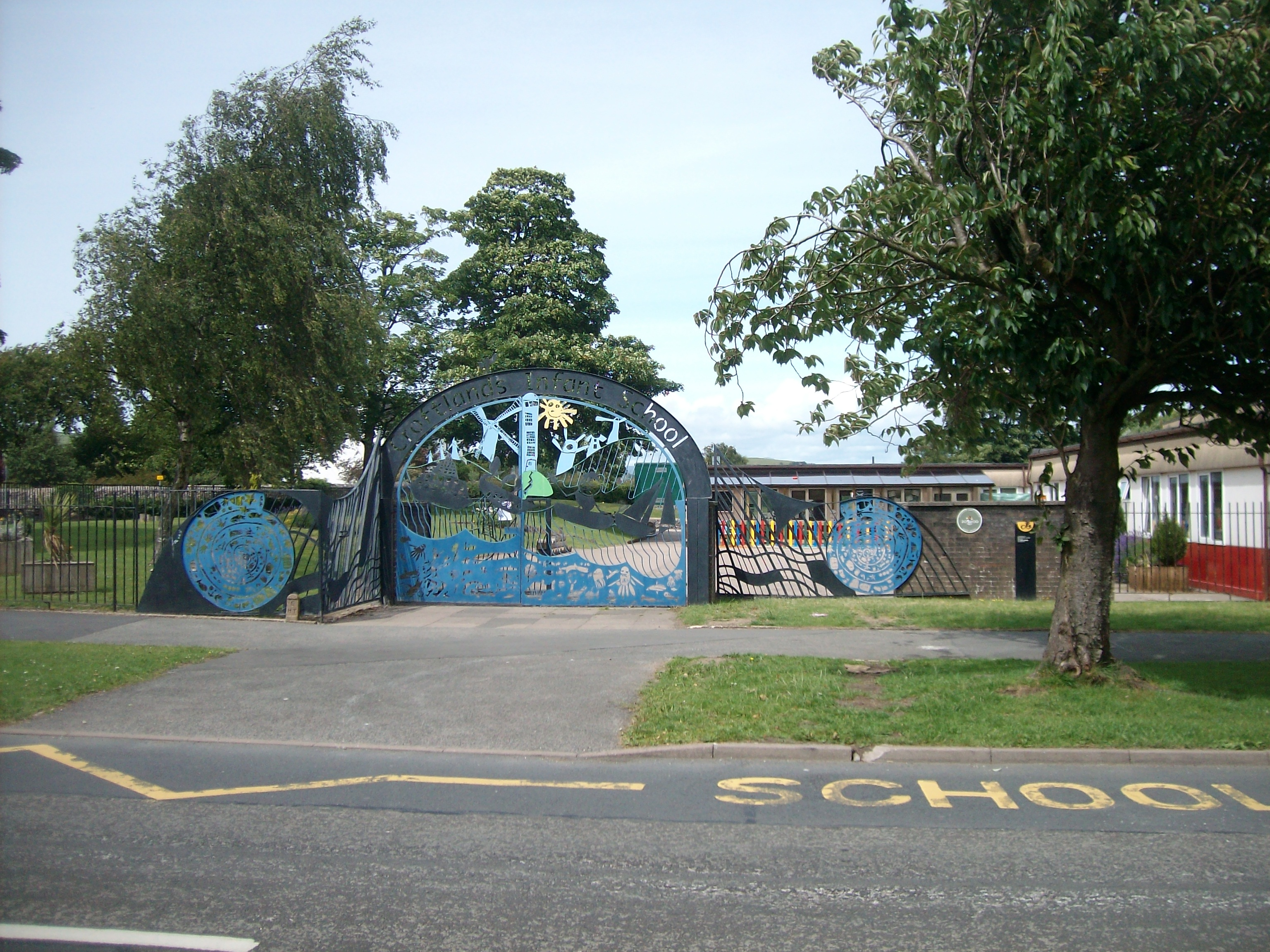
Entrance to Croftlands Infant School

Ulverston Victoria High School (UVHS), the town's secondary school, with some 1,200 pupils, includes a sixth form college with about 400. There are four main primary schools; Croftlands Junior (secular), St Mary's (Catholic), Church Walk (Church of England) and Sir John Barrow (secular) and a special education school, located on the site of former Todbusk building on UVHS site.

== Transport ==
Ulverston railway station, a short walk from the town centre, lies on the Furness Line between Barrow-in-Furness and Lancaster, which leads on to Manchester Airport. Some trains continue along the Cumbrian Coast Line to Carlisle.

The town's several bus services are operated by Stagecoach.

== Local media ==
Regional TV news comes from Salford-based BBC North West and ITV Granada. Television signals are received from the Winter Hill TV transmitter, and the Lancaster relay transmitter.

Local radio stations are BBC Radio Cumbria, Heart North West, Smooth Lake District and community based radio stations Cando FM, and Bay Trust Radio.

The town's local newspapers are The Westmorland Gazette and North West Evening Mail.

== Twin towns ==
Ulverston is twinned with Albert in France. They meet alternately at Easter each year to play football for the Cyril Barker Shield.

In July 2016 Ulverston, as the birthplace of the film comedian Stan Laurel, was officially twinned with Harlem, Georgia, United States, birthplace of Laurel's screen partner Oliver Hardy.

== Festivals ==
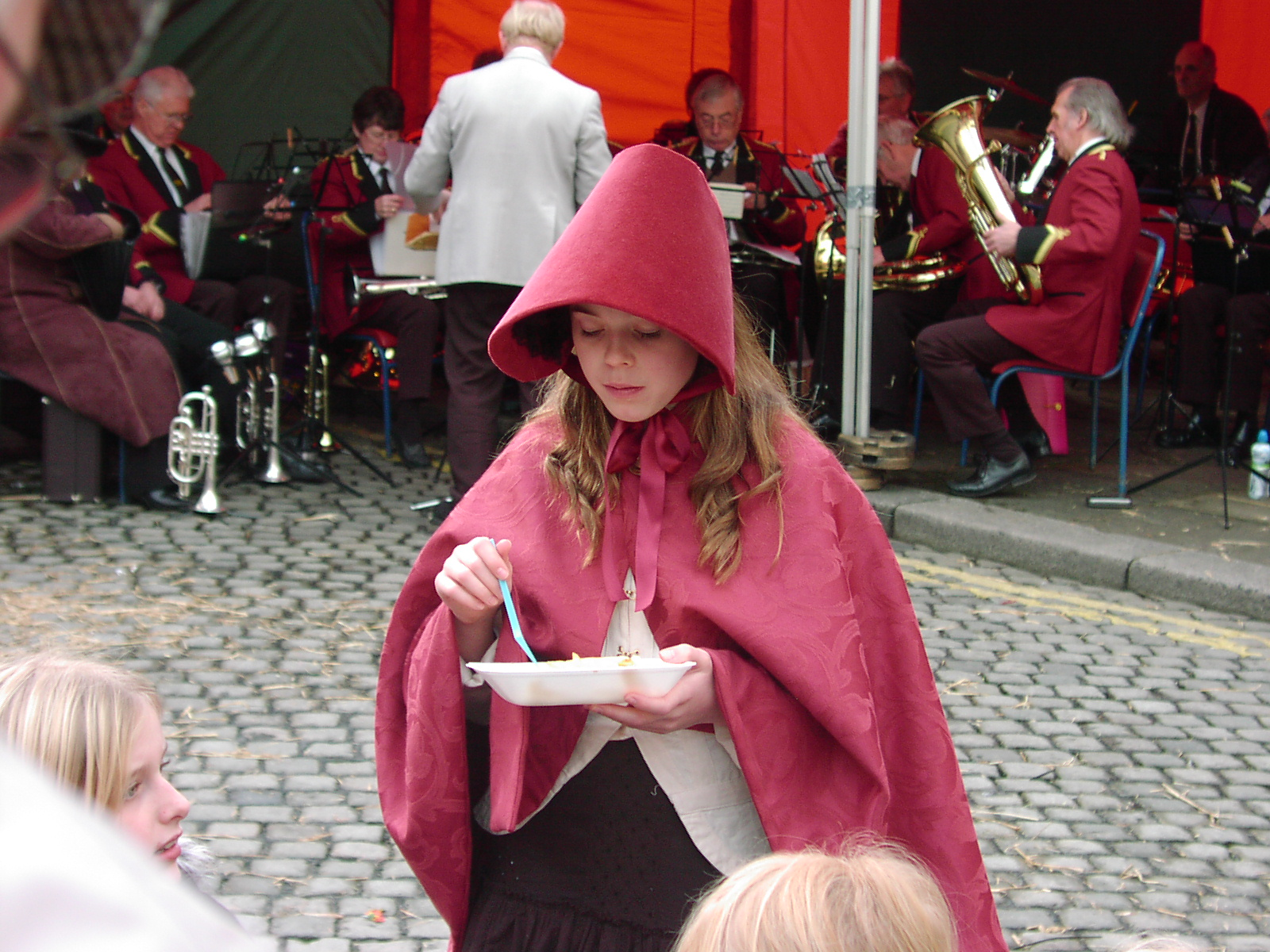
The Dickensian Festival, held the final weekend of November, sees a range of Christmas stalls and attractions visit Ulverston. People often dress up for it in Victorian attire.

The many festivals held at Ulverston include:

- Another Fine Fest, celebrating Ulverston and the birth of Stan Laurel.
- Dickensian Festival.
- Festival of Light
- Furness Tradition.
- Lantern Festival
- Retro Rendezvous

== Sport ==
=== Football ===
Ulverston Rangers association football team has existed since 1945. It currently plays in the West Lancashire Football League and has 2 teams in the Furness Football League.

=== Rugby League ===
Ulverston Amateur Rugby League Football Club plays home games at Dragley Beck, it belongs to the North West Counties Rugby League. It has produced several professional rugby players, including Derek Hadley.

=== Other sports ===
The town's two field hockey clubs, South Lakes and Ulverston, are based at Ulverston Leisure Centre. The town regularly has events run by Lakeland Orienteering Club. A parkrun event has been held every Saturday at Ford Park since 2018.

== Music ==
Ulverston features a prominent local music culture centred around annual festivals, community ensembles, and its central performance venue, the Coronation Hall.

=== Venues and music festivals ===
The town hosts several prominent musical events throughout the year. The Ulverston International Music Festival (UIMF), founded by classical pianist Anthony Hewitt, has run annually since 2003. The festival brings internationally recognised classical, jazz, and folk musicians to venues around the town and broader South Cumbria region. Additionally, the South Cumbria Musical Festival, established in 1976, is a week-long competitive event held at the Coronation Hall that showcases local and regional talent in music, speech, and dramatic performance. For contemporary and independent music, the town hosts Another Fine Fest, a multi-venue street festival featuring live bands, street art, and comedy.

=== Local ensembles ===
The town has a notable history of youth music education, largely driven by the music department at Ulverston Victoria High School (UVHS). The UVHS Swing Band has achieved national recognition, winning the Specialist Schools and Academies Trust (SSAT) national competition for function bands, recording collaborative albums with the Royal Marines, and performing on national broadcasting networks including Blue Peter, Classic FM, and BBC Radio 2. In recognition of a 20-year partnership supporting and training local young musicians alongside UVHS, the Band of His Majesty's Royal Marines (Scotland and Plymouth) was granted the Freedom of the Town by Ulverston Town Council in 2025.

=== Street music and community performance ===
Ulverston has a distinct tradition of street music and outdoor busking tied to its festival calendar and historical connection to the radical arts company Welfare State International (WSI), which moved its headquarters to the town in 1979. WSI introduced free public music and craft workshops, which directly catalysed the creation of BLAST Furness, a prominent local community street band. Formed in the early 1980s, the acoustic brass and percussion ensemble plays a central role in the annual Ulverston Lantern Festival, providing live outdoor accompaniment to the candle-lit procession through the town's historic streets.

Street music is also heavily featured during Another Fine Fest, an annual summer event that hosts outdoor stages alongside wandering street performers, brass bands, and buskers throughout the market town. In addition to festival line-ups, the town centre's cobbled streets and market areas serve as a frequent hub for independent buskers..

=== Noise regulation and busking complaints ===
The high frequency of outdoor performances in the town's historic centre has occasionally led to friction regarding noise levels. In January 2023, a formal noise complaint made against musicians performing in the town centre prompted intervention from Cumbria Police. The incident, which involved three separate musical acts included a band and two solo guitarists playing concurrently on Market Street was initiated by a complainant who alleged that town centre business operations were being disrupted by the volume. While the police intervention concluded without any offences identified or legal action taken, the event sparked significant public backlash regarding the protection and regulation of the town's live street music identity.

=== Musical use of the Sir John Barrow Monument ===
Although the Sir John Barrow Monument was constructed in 1850 primarily as a commemorative historical landmark, the 21st century has seen the site increasingly utilised for local artistic, civic, and charitable events. During the COVID-19 pandemic, the landscape of Hoad Hill became a regular writing environment for local musician and busker Peter Buckley, who walked to the hill daily to compose melodies and lyrics. This connection subsequently led to the landmark being utilised as a live performance space.

The landmark also shares a deep historic tie with the Ulverston Town Band, which provided live accompaniment when the landmark's foundation stone was first laid on 15 May 1850. The band routinely performs at the summit for historic milestones, including centenary events and playing "The Last Post" during civic remembrance and beacon-lighting ceremonies.

== International links ==
The Royal Norwegian Honorary Consulate in Barrow-in-Furness, one of the numerous consulates of Norway, is actually located on the outskirts of Ulverston.

The town of Ulverstone in Tasmania, Australia is named after Ulverston and likewise built at the mouth of a River Leven.

== Religion ==
=== Christianity ===
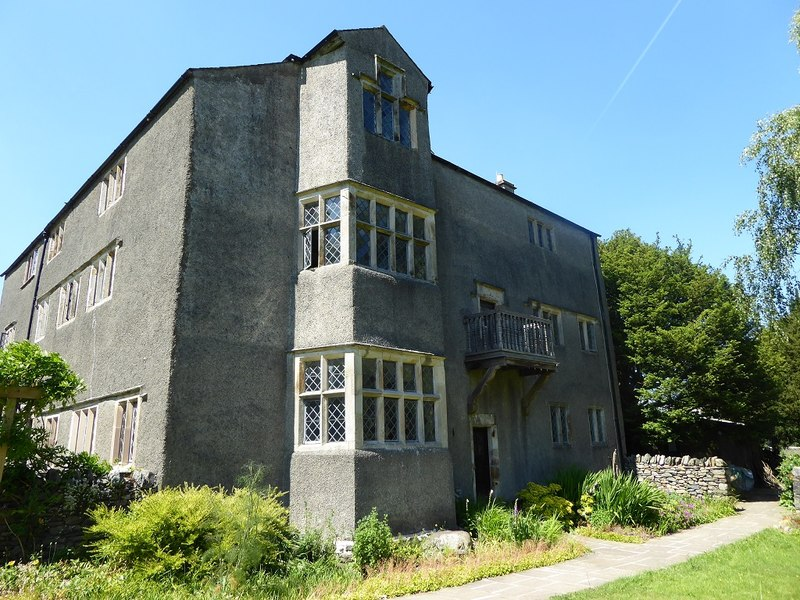
Swarthmoor Hall, the manor that Margaret Fell and George Fox established the Quaker movement

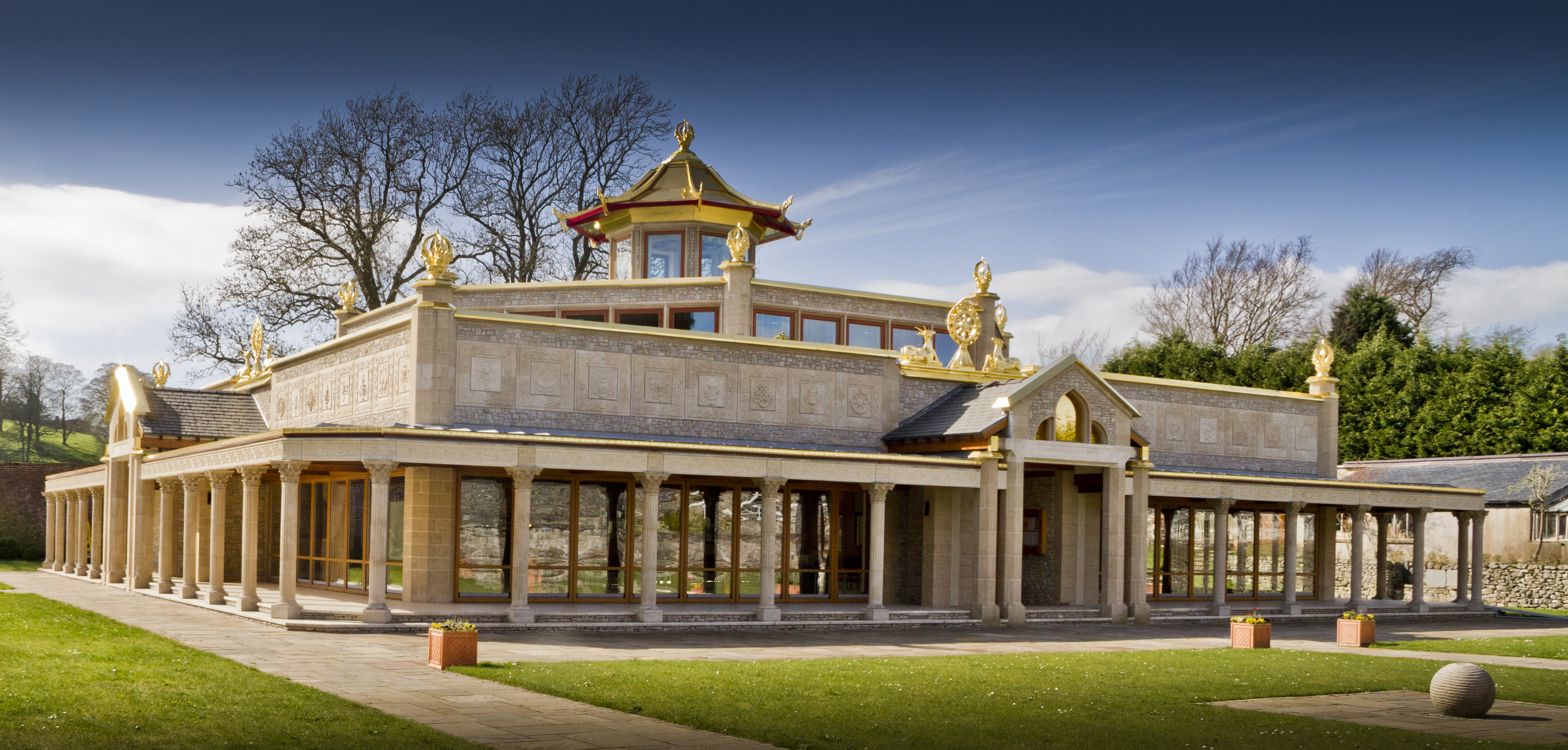
Manjushri Kadampa Meditation Centre, the international headquarters of the New Kadampa Tradition.

Ulverston is where George Fox and Margaret Fell established the Religious Society of Friends (Quaker) movement in 1652 at Swarthmoor Hall just outside of Ulverston. One of the founders of the Quaker movement Margaret Fell resided in Swarthmoor Hall and was lady of the hall from 1641. Swarthmoor Hall became a Quaker rest house and later became a Grade II listed building.

=== Buddhism ===
The New Kadampa Tradition is headquartered in the Manjushri Kadampa Meditation Centre whom purchased Conishead Priory in 1976. Buddhism is Ulverston's second largest religion after Christianity.

== Freedom of the Town ==
The following people and military units have received the Freedom of the Town of Ulverston.

=== Individuals ===
- Peter Winston: 15 May 2019.
- Les Tallon: 21 November 2022.

=== Military units ===
- The Duke of Lancaster's Regiment: 7 May 2011.
- 2223 (Ulverston) Squadron Air Training Corps: 18 April 2015.
- The Band of His Majesty's Royal Marines (Scotland and Plymouth): 25 April 2025

== Notable people ==
In alphabetical order:

- Ella Blaylock Atherton (1860–1933), physician
- Cuthbert Bardsley (1907–1991), Anglican bishop of Coventry, was born in Ulveston
- Amelia Edith Huddleston Barr (1831–1919), novelist, was born in Ulverston
- Sir John Barrow (1764–1848), statesman, was born at Dragley Beck, he was the Admiralty's Second Secretary. A monument to him; a replica of the third Eddystone Lighthouse, stands on Hoad Hill overlooking the town.
- Norman Birkett, 1st Baron Birkett (1883–1962), judge, politician and preacher who served as alternate British judge in the Nuremberg Trials, was born in Ulverston
- Norman Gifford (1940 – 2026), international cricketer
- Jess Gillam (born 1998), saxophonist
- Francis Arthur Jefferson (1921–1982), a Victoria Cross-winning soldier born in Ulverston
- Winifred Langton (1909–2003), communist activist, lived in Ulverston
- Stan Laurel (1890–1965), actor born at 3 Argyle Street, Ulverston, the home of his grandparents, George and Sarah Metcalfe, who had previously lived at 32 Oxford Street in the town
- Kate Lister (born 1981), historian and blogger
- Selina Martin (1882–1972), suffragette
- Christine McVie (1943–2022), singer and songwriter born in the nearby village of Bouth
- Frank Oldfield (1882–1956), baritone; born in Ulverston
- James Penny (1741–1799), slave-ship owner, who became a prominent anti-abolitionist
- Bob Shaw (1931–1996), science fiction writer, lived in Ulverston.
- Kathryn Warner (author)
- William Basil Weston (1924–1945), a Victoria Cross-winning officer, was born in Ulverston. There is a memorial to him in the town's Catholic Church.

== Arms ==
Coat of arms of Ulverston
Crest Out of a coronet composed of four roses Gules barbed and seeded Proper set upon a rim Or a demi wolf Sable breathing flames and gorged with a leather collar Proper buckled and pendent therefrom by a chain an escutcheon Gold charged with a ray of lightning throughout in bend also Gules surmounted of an ankh Vert and supporting a garb also Gold. Escutcheon Argent two bars Gules a pale Sable fretty of the first between two abbots' crosiers addorsed also Sable on a chief Azure an anchor between two fleurs-de-Lys Or. Motto Optimum Sufficit (Only The Best Is Enough)

== See also ==
- Listed buildings in Ulverston
- Ulverston Canal
