= St Mary's Church, Penny Bridge =

Coordinates: 54.2345°N 3.0593°W

- Location in Cumbria
- OS grid reference: SD 31051 82605
- Location: Penny Bridge, Egton with Newland, Cumbria
- Country: England
- Denomination: Anglican
- Website: St Mary, Penny Bridge

History
- Status: Parish church
- Dedication: Saint Mary the Virgin

Architecture
- Functional status: Active
- Architect(s): Miles Thompson, E. G. Paley
- Architectural type: Church
- Style: Gothic Revival

Specifications
- Materials: Slate rubble

Administration
- Province: York
- Diocese: Carlisle
- Archdeaconry: Westmorland with Furness
- Deanery: Furness
- Parish: Egton with Newland

Clergy
- Vicar: Revd Brian Streeter

St Mary's Church is on a site overlooking the villages of Penny Bridge and Greenodd, in the parish of Egton with Newland, Cumbria, England. It is an active Anglican parish church in the deanery of Furness, the archdeaconry of Westmorland with Furness, and the diocese of Carlisle. Its benefice is united with those of St Andrew, Coniston, St Luke, Torver, St Luke, Lowick, and Holy Trinity, Colton.

== History ==
The first church on the site was built before 1786. It was a chapel of ease to Ulverston parish church. The church was built in roughcast stone; it was a long low building with a large west tower. This church had round-headed windows. A new, larger church was built in 1831. The chancel was added in 1855–56, designed by Miles Thompson. In 1864–65 the nave was rebuilt by the Lancaster architect E. G. Paley, and the south aisle was added. This work cost £1,000 (equivalent to £110,000 in 2025), and was paid for by Countess Blücher von Wahlstadt. A transept was added in about 1890. The tower was demolished in 1893, and a replacement designed by Frearson was erected in 1969.

== Architecture ==
The church is constructed in slate rubble, with red stone dressings. The west front is rendered. Its plan consists of a nave, a south aisle, a chancel, a south transept, with a tower at the northwest corner, and a west porch. The tower has a saddleback roof. Inside the church, the arches of the arcade are in brick. The carved wooden reredos dates from 1908. Also in the church is a painting of the Descent from the Cross. The stained glass is by William Wailes. The two manual organ was built in 1866 by Wilkinson, and was moved from the west end to the chancel in 1890. The lychgate is a First World War memorial.

== See also ==
- List of ecclesiastical works by E. G. Paley
