= Arrad Foot =

Coordinates: 54.218°N 3.062°W

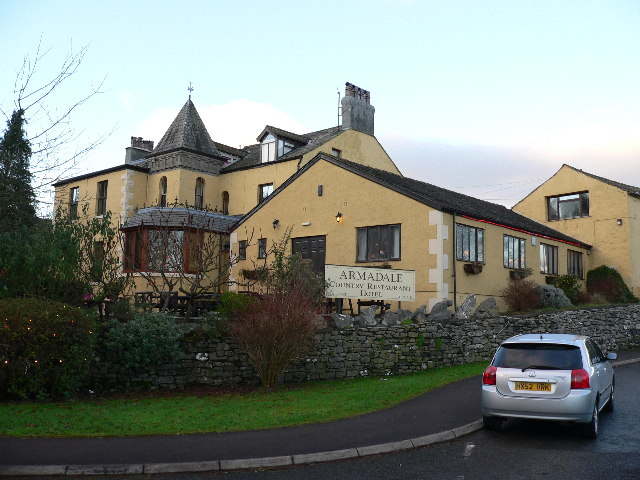
- The Armadale Hotel, Arrad Foot

- Location in South Lakeland Location within Cumbria
- OS grid reference: SD307807
- Civil parish: Egton with Newland
- Unitary authority: Westmorland and Furness
- Ceremonial county: Cumbria
- Region: North West
- Country: England
- Sovereign state: United Kingdom
- Post town: ULVERSTON
- Postcode district: LA12
- Dialling code: 01229
- Police: Cumbria
- Fire: Cumbria
- Ambulance: North West
- UK Parliament: Barrow and Furness

Arrad Foot is a hamlet in Westmorland and Furness, Cumbria, England.

The hamlet is situated on a minor road just off the A590 road, with the village of Greenodd to the north, and the town Ulverston to the south.
