= Listed buildings in Egton with Newland =

Egton with Newland is a civil parish in Westmorland and Furness, Cumbria, England. It contains eleven listed buildings that are recorded in the National Heritage List for England. Of these, two are listed at Grade II*, the middle of the three grades, and the others are at Grade II, the lowest grade. The parish contains the villages and settlements of Greenodd, Newland, and Penny Bridge, and the surrounding countryside. The listed buildings include former industrial buildings at Newland, houses, bridges, and a public house.

== Key ==
Grade	Criteria
II*	Particularly important buildings of more than special interest
II	Buildings of national importance and special interest

== Buildings ==
Name and location	Photograph	Date	Notes	Grade
Penny Bridge; 54.24067°N 3.06020°W		16th century	The bridge, which was later widened, carries a road over the River Crake. It is in stone, and consists of three segmental arches with triangular cutwaters. The bridge has straight parapets with upright coping stones.	II
Plumpton Hall; 54.19956°N 3.05465°W		Mid to late 16th century	A country house that was extended in the early 18th century, it is in stone, mainly roughcast, with slate roofs. The house has two storeys, and an L-shaped plan, consisting of a seven-bay main range, and a two-bay west wing. The central entrance has moulded jambs, an embattled lintel, a hood mould, and three ball finials. Most of the windows are sashes.	II*
Farmer's Arms Public House; 54.25509°N 3.07266°W		17th century	The public house is roughcast with slate roofs and two storeys. It has been extended by the addition of flanking four-bay wings to the central range. The first two bays of the left wing have a gallery with timber-framed walls, in the third bay are mullioned windows, and the fourth bay contains an entrance in a lean-to porch with a casement window above. In the central range is a gabled dormer, and elsewhere the windows are a mix of sashes and casements.	II
Newland Bottom Mill; 54.21190°N 3.07993°W	—	1712	A mill and attached house in stone, partly roughcast, with slate roofs. The mill has two storeys and three bays with a wider gabled wing to the west. The house has three storeys and a three-storey wing to the north. Most of the windows are casements.	II
Newland Blast Furnace; 54.20824°N 3.07476°W		Late 18th century or earlier	Formerly an iron-making furnace and its ancillary buildings, they are now either used for other purposes or are disused. The buildings are in local slate with sandstone quoins and Westmorland slate roofs. They consist of a blast furnace with a truncated square tower, the remains of a casting house and a blowing house, and other ancillary buildings. The blast furnace and associated structures are a Scheduled Monument.	II*
Bridge north of Milford Cottage; 54.20889°N 3.07591°W	—	Late 18th century	The bridge carries a track over Newland Beck. It is in green Lakeland stone, and consists of two segmental arches, the arches and central pier rising from bedrock. The piers have cutwaters, and the bridge has parapets with splayed abutments.	II
Summer Hill; 54.24685°N 3.07237°W	—	Late 18th century	A country house in late Georgian style that was extended in the early 19th century, and again in about 2006. It has two storeys, the ground floor is roughcast, the upper floor is stuccoed, and the roof is slated. There is a front of three bays with bands and an eaves cornice. At the entrance is a Doric porch with paired columns and a triglyph frieze, and the doorway has an architrave and a fanlight. The windows are casements, in the ground floor they have architraves and keystones, and in the upper floor they have half-fluted pilasters, cornices and keystones.	II
Charcoal storage barn, Newland Blast Furnace; 54.20851°N 3.07534°W	—	Late 18th or early 19th century	The building is in local slate with sandstone quoins and a Westmorland slate roof. It has a T-shaped plan with a main range, and smaller wings at right angles.	II
Newland Houses and Furnace Cottage; 54.20807°N 3.07475°W	—	Late 18th or early 19th century	A terrace of three houses in rendered stone with artificial slate roofs, in two and three storeys. The windows vary; some are sash windows. some are casements, and there are also bay windows.	II
Pair of houses northwest of Ship Inn; 54.23344°N 3.05383°W	—	Late 18th or early 19th century	The houses have three storeys and three bays, the ground floor is stuccoed, the upper floors are roughcast, and the roof is slated. The outer bays contain a sash window in each floor. In the central bay there are three doorways with fanlights, above which are blind windows painted as sashes.	II
Bridge to north of Newland Bottom Mill; 54.21206°N 3.08062°W	—	19th century	The bridge carries a road over Newland Beck. It is in slate rubble, and consists of a single segmental arch. The bridge has straight parapets.	II
