= St John the Baptist's Church, Blawith =

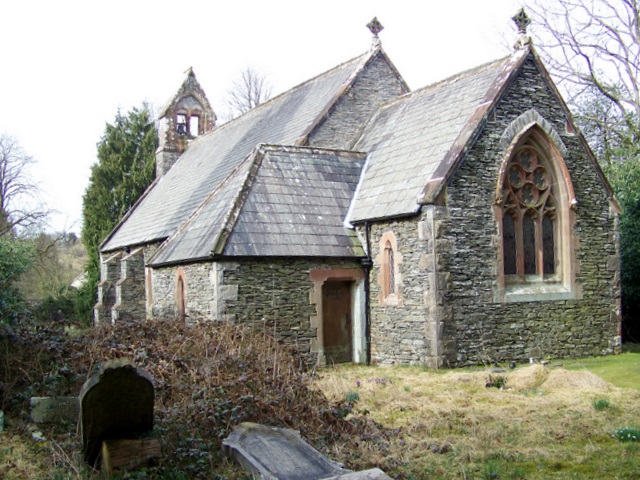
- St John the Baptist's Church, Blawith

- Location in Cumbria
- OS grid reference: SD 288,883
- Location: Blawith, Cumbria
- Country: England
- Denomination: Anglican
- Website: Churches Conservation Trust

History
- Dedication: Saint John the Baptist

Architecture
- Functional status: Redundant
- Architect(s): E. G. Paley; Austin, Paley and Austin
- Architectural type: Church
- Style: Gothic Revival
- Groundbreaking: 1862
- Completed: 1863
- Construction cost: £1,600 (equivalent to £170,000 in 2025)
- Closed: 1998

Specifications
- Capacity: 171
- Materials: Whinstone, slate roof

St John the Baptist's Church is a redundant Anglican church in the settlement of Blawith, Cumbria, England. It is located to the east of the A5084 road, south of Coniston Water in the Lake District.

== New church ==
St John's was designed by the Lancaster architect E. G. Paley and built in 1862–63. It is constructed in whinstone with a slate roof, and was built to replace an older church, also dedicated to Saint John the Baptist. Its plan consists of a nave, with a short chancel and a bellcote. The windows are lancets containing plate tracery. The church cost £1,600 (equivalent to £170,000 in 2025), and had seating for a congregation of 169 or 171. Its architectural style is Gothic Revival, and it contains stained glass windows in the chancel depicting the Ascension, the Presentation in the Temple, and the Adoration of the Magi. In 1914, Paley's successors Austin, Paley and Austin rebuilt the chancel arch and the top part of the east wall at a cost of £196, and in 1926 the same practice carried out repairs to the north and west walls, and added buttresses to the south wall of the nave. The church was declared redundant on 1 March 1988.

== Old church ==
The ruins of the older church remain nearby, on the other side of the road (54.2847°N 3.0949°W). This church was built in the 16th century and it was rebuilt in 1749. It was "little better than a barn, of small dimensions, without a tower or steeple" and by 1861 was in "so ruinous a condition" that it had to be replaced. The remains consist of stone walls rising to a height of between 3 metres (10 ft) and 6 metres (20 ft), with a taller structure at the west end. The ruins are recorded in the National Heritage List for England as a designated Grade II listed building.

== See also ==
- Listed buildings in Blawith and Subberthwaite
- List of ecclesiastical works by E. G. Paley
- List of ecclesiastical works by Austin and Paley (1895–1916)
