= Listed buildings in Blawith and Subberthwaite =

Blawith and Subberthwaite is a civil parish in the South Lakeland District of Cumbria, England. It contains nine listed buildings that are recorded in the National Heritage List for England. All the listed buildings are designated at Grade II, the lowest of the three grades, which is applied to "buildings of national importance and special interest". The parish contains the village of Blawith and surrounding countryside and hills. The listed buildings consist of a ruined church, houses and associated structures, farmhouses and farm buildings, and a bridge.

== Buildings ==
Name and location	Photograph	Date	Notes
Ruins of former St John's Church; 54.28469°N 3.09484°W	—	c. 1590	The church was rebuilt in 1749, but later became redundant and was replaced by St John the Baptist's Church. It is now in ruins, which consist of stone walls between 3 feet (0.91 m) and 6 feet (1.8 m) high. The ruins have a rectangular plan, with a projection at the west, and to the north are the footings of a building.
Tottlebank Farmhouse; 54.28403°N 3.12318°W	—	17th century	The farmhouse is in rendered stone with a green slate roof. It has an L-shaped plan, with two storeys, a front of four bays, and a single-bay wing. Most of the windows are 20th-century casements, and others are fixed.
Stable Harvey Farmhouse and outbuilding 54.31597°N 3.10167°W	—	1711	The farmhouse is in stone, partly rendered, with a slate roof, hipped at one end. There are two storeys and three bays, and a gabled rear wing with an outshut. The main part has a central gabled porch, and windows with upper opening lights, and in the rear wing are casement windows. The outbuilding to the left has a projecting ground floor with a gallery above.
Bouthray Bridge; 54.29152°N 3.09028°W	—	18th century (probable)	The bridge carries a road, Water Yeat, over the River Crake. It is in stone, and consists of two segmental arches, that to the east being the wider. The pier has a cutwater to the north, and the parapet is plain and contains an inscribed stone.
Farm buildings, Stable Harvey Farm; 54.31585°N 3.10180°W	—	18th century (probable)	The range of farm buildings consists of a cow house flanked by a barn on each side; they are in stone with slate roofs. The barns have three bays each, and the cow house has four. In the buildings are doorways, and windows of varying types, including one mullioned window.
Newbiggin; 54.28645°N 3.09509°W	—	Late 18th or early 19th century	A roughcast stone house with a slate roof, it has two storeys and two bays, a rear outshut, and a small left gabled wing. On the front is a trellised gabled porch with a cornice, and the windows are sashes.
Highfield Hotel; 54.28356°N 3.09384°W	—	Early to mid 19th century	Originally a country house, later a hotel, stuccoed with hipped slate roofs. There are two storeys, a front of three bays, with single-storey bays at the sides, and two-storey wings at the rear. The central bay is canted with a gablet containing a cartouche. On the front is an iron verandah carried on round columns and with a balustrade. The round-headed entrance has panelled pilastered and a fanlight. There are French windows on the ground floor and in the centre of the upper floor; most of the other windows are sashes with hood moulds. The gables have decorative bargeboards.
Gate to east of Highfield Hotel; 54.28374°N 3.09302°W	—	Early to mid 19th century	At the entrance to the drive is a pair of stone gate piers. These are octagonal with caps, and are flanked by decorative iron panels. The gate is detached, it is richly ornamented, and acts as a screen.
Gate to north of Highfield Hotel; 54.28417°N 3.09404°W	—	Early to mid 19th century	At the entrance to the drive is a pair of stone gate piers. These are octagonal, they are flanked by decorative iron screens, and the gate is richly ornamented.
