= Ulverston Town Hall =

Municipal building in Ulverston, Cumbria, England

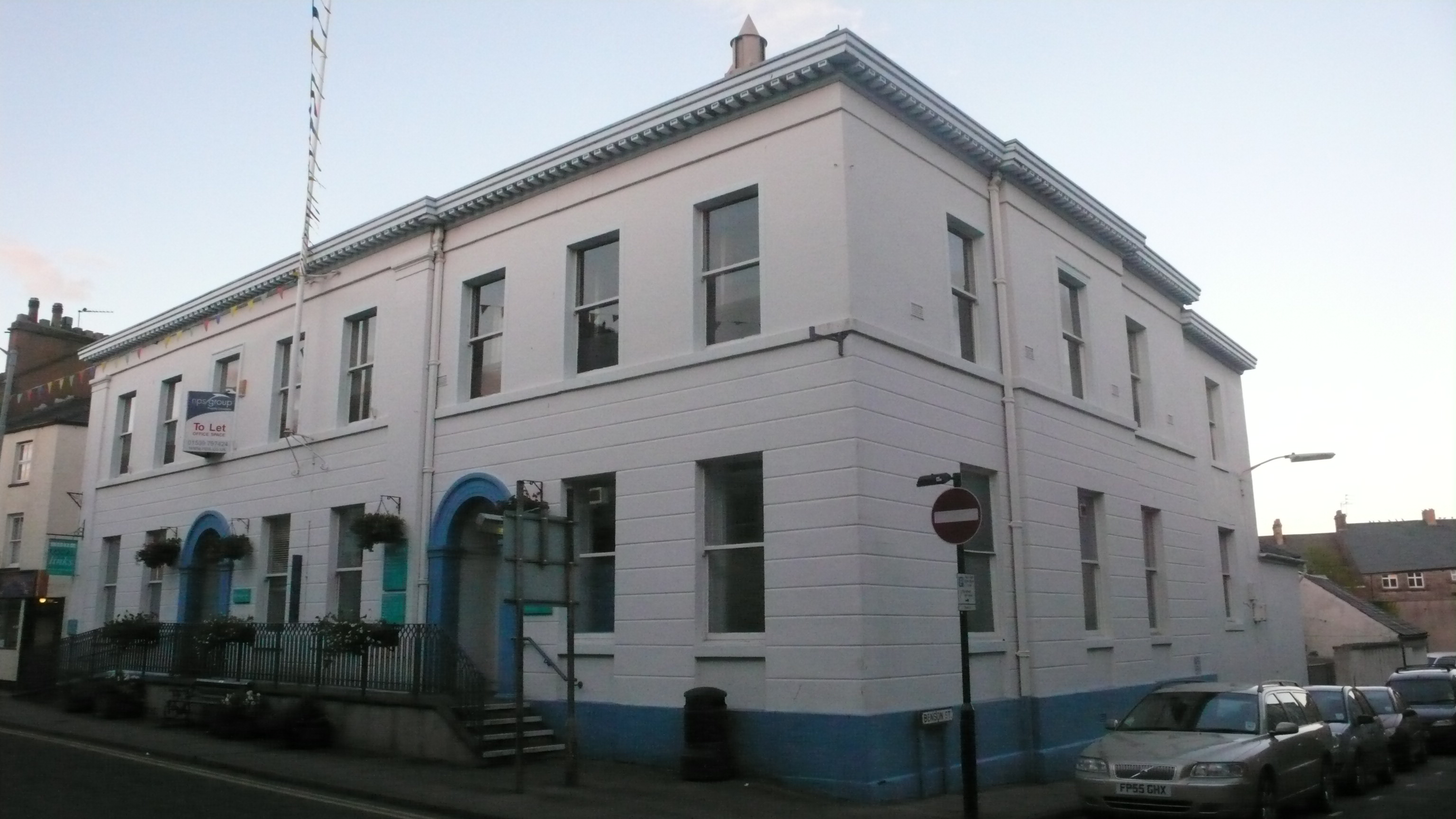
- The building in 2012

- Cumbria
- 54.1951°N 3.0964°W
- Location: Queen Street, Ulverston

History
- Built: 1825

Site notes
- Architect: James Wright Grundy
- Architectural style: Neoclassical style

Ulverston Town Hall is a former municipal building on Queen Street, Ulverston, a town in Cumbria, England. The building has been converted for residential use.

== History ==
The building was commissioned by a local merchant and banker, George Shaw Petty, who adapted a barn, erected some years earlier, and extended it to create a house in 1825. Apart from the barn the site had previously been undeveloped. In the 1870s, the bank was taken over by Wakefield, Crewdson and Company of Kendal, and in the late 19th century, the bank was extended, closing up with the other structures to form a single building on the site. Wakefield, Crewdson and Company merged with Bank of Liverpool in 1893.

Following significant population growth, largely associated with its status as a market town, Ulverston became an urban district in 1894. In this context, the new council purchased the bank for use as a town hall. Conversion work started in 1902. The work was carried out to a design by James Wright Grundy in the neoclassical style, involved the provision of a cement render finish and was completed in 1904. The design involved an asymmetrical main frontage of eight bays facing onto Queen Street. The left hand section of five bays (the original structure) was slightly projected forward and flanked by full-height Doric order pilasters. The third bay from each end featured a round headed entrance door flanked by pilasters supporting imposts and archivolts. The other bays on the ground floor and all the bays on the first floor were fenestrated by wooden sash windows. At roof level, there was a modillioned cornice. Internally, the principal room was a new council chamber which, together with a staircase, was inserted into the structure.

The building continued to serve as the local seat of government until the enlarged South Lakeland District Council was formed at Kendal in 1974. It subsequently served as the offices and meeting place of Ulverston Town Council until the building became dilapidated and the town council had to relocate to the Coronation Hall in County Square in 2014. By that time, the building had also become underused. South Lakeland District Council declared it surplus to requirements and it was sold to South Lakes Housing Association for a nominal sum.

Work began in 2018 to convert the building into 17 apartments some of which were intended to be available for rent at affordable prices. The works, which were undertaken by Leck Construction and financed by Homes England, the housing association and the district council, also involved the restoration of the wooden sash windows and entrance doors. The conversion was completed in August 2020.
