= Rusland Pool =

Stream in Cumbria, England

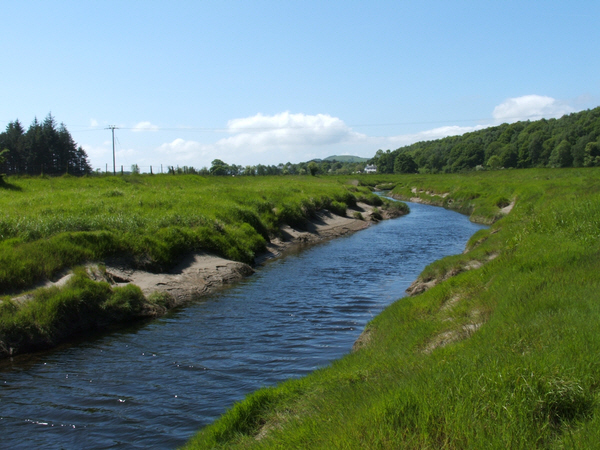
- Rusland Pool near to the A590 and River Leven

- Location within Cumbria

Location
- Country: United Kingdom
- County: Cumbria

Physical characteristics
- Source: Grizedale Forest
- Mouth: River Leven, Cumbria
  - coordinates: 54.2462°N 3.0309°W

Rusland Pool is a small stream or beck running through the administrative county of Cumbria. Before 1974, Rusland Pool was in Lancashire.

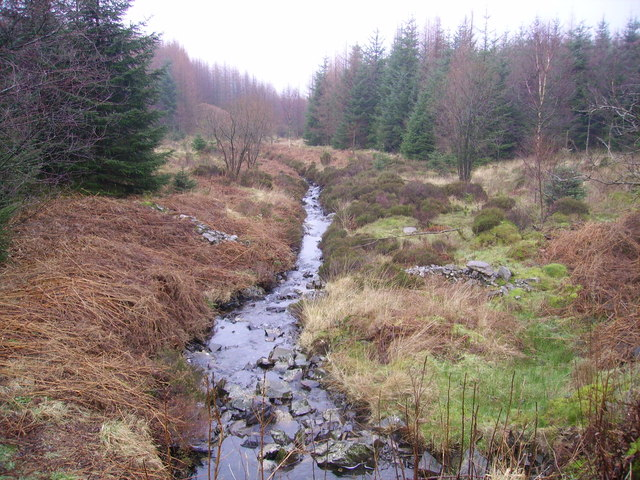
Grizedale Beck in Grizedale Forest near Moor Top.

The source of Rusland Pool is to be found in Grizedale Forest Park, where several streams draining Monk Coniston Moor and Hawkshead Moor converge near Jack Gap Plantation (where Rusland Pool is known as Grizedale Beck). The beck then follows a southerly course through Grizedale Forest Park, flowing past the settlements of Grizedale and Satterthwaite (where it collects Farra Grain, becoming Force Back) and being joined by Ashes Beck at Rusland, taking its name from this settlement, before continuing its course through the Rusland Valley, before its waters join the estuarine River Leven at Pool Foot near Haverthwaite.

The name of the stream has not always been Rusland Pool - John Speed's 1610 map of Lancashire records the name as Foße fl. (i.e. River Fosse - cf the tributary Force Beck). In 2007, otters were found to have returned to Rusland Pool after many years absence.

== Tributaries ==
- Wear Beck (R)
- Black Beck (R)
- Skowbarrow Beck (L)
- Yew Beck (R)
  - Bell Beck (L)
- Ashes Beck (L)
  - Dale Park Beck (R)
  - Little Mire Beck (L)
- Force Beck (R)
  - Farra Grain (R)
    - Farra Grain Gill (L)
      - Bell Beck (R)
  - Grizedale Beck (R)
