= River Crake =

River in Cumbria, England

Coordinates: 54°14′N 3°03′W

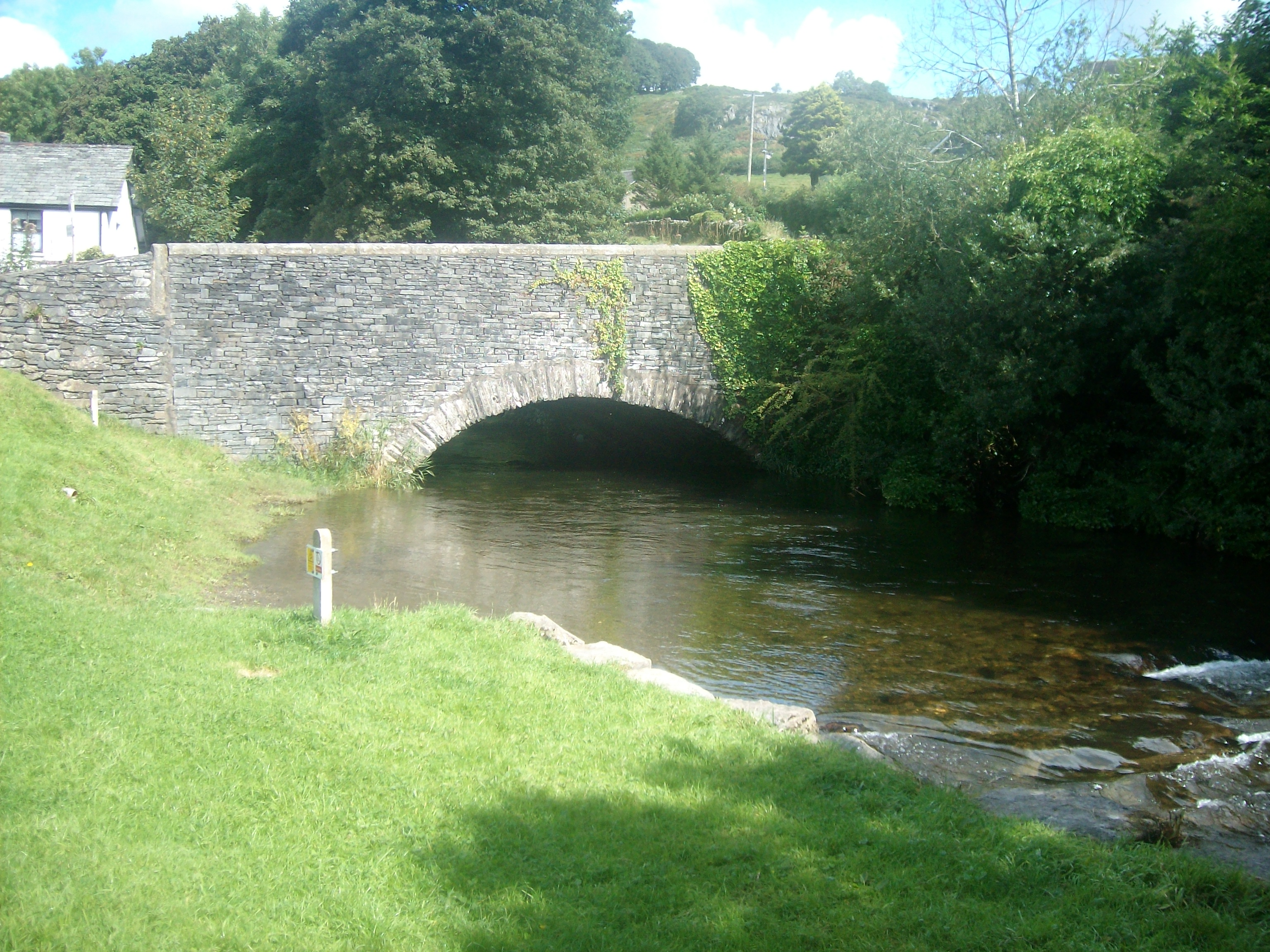
The river at Spark Bridge

The River Crake is a short river in the English Lake District. The name probably derives from the Celtic languages (most likely Brythonic languages; ie Cumbric language) and means rocky stream. The river drains Coniston Water from its southernmost point and flows for about 6 miles (9.5 km) in a southerly direction before joining the upper estuary of the River Leven at Greenodd. The river is in the historic county of Lancashire, but in an area that formed part of the county Cumbria after the 1974 reorganisation of local government.

The villages of Water Yeat, Blawith, Lowick Bridge, Spark Bridge and Penny Bridge are located close to the river in the Crake Valley. As well as receiving the outflow from Coniston the river also drains Beacon Tarn in the Blawith Fells above the southern end of Coniston.

In the 19th century numerous industries including a cotton mill and iron foundry flourished along the river, making use of the fast flowing water to drive machinery. A bobbin mill at Spark Bridge, which manufactured wooden bobbins for the Lancashire cotton industry, used water-powered lathes to turn the wood. The factory survived into the 1970s using Gilkes water turbines to generate electricity and turn the lathes. The factory was eventually forced to close by the punitive water usage charges levied by the North West Water Authority. Today there are no obvious signs of any of the riverside industries.

The Crake is a noted salmon river.

The River Crake is the model for the Amazon River in Arthur Ransome's Swallows and Amazons series of children's novels according to Hugh Brogan, although the Crake flows out of Coniston Water but the Amazon flows into the Lake. The Allan Tarn at the beginning of the river became the Octopus Lagoon.
