= Listed buildings in Lowick, Cumbria =

Civil parish in Cumbria, England

Lowick is a civil parish in Westmorland and Furness, Cumbria, England. It contains two listed buildings that are recorded in the National Heritage List for England. Of these, one is are listed at Grade II*, the middle of the three grades, and the other is at Grade II, the lowest grade. The parish is in the Lake District National Park, it contains the village of Lowick, and is otherwise rural. The listed buildings consist of a hall dating from the 16th century, and a 19th-century church.

== Key ==
Grade	Criteria
II*	Particularly important buildings of more than special interest
II	Buildings of national importance and special interest

== Buildings ==
Name and location	Photograph	Date	Notes	Grade
Lowick Hall; 54.26428°N 3.09795°W		16th century	The house originated as a peel tower, since demolished, the oldest part is the south wing, the rest of the house dates from the 18th century, and the porch was added in 1880. The main block has two storeys and five bays, and the south wing has three storeys. The house has a top frieze, a cornice and a blocking course, and the gable of the south wing has decorative bargeboards. The windows in the main block are sashes with architraves, and in the wing they are mullioned. The stone porch has a dentilled cornice and a parapet.	II*
St Luke's Church; 54.26539°N 3.09164°W		1865	The church is built in slate rubble with sandstone dressings, buttresses, and a slate roof with coped gables. It consists of a nave, a chancel with a south organ loft and a north vestry, and a west tower with a south porch and north stair turret. The tower has an embattled parapet and a pyramidal rood with a weathervane. The windows are lancets, and on the wall of the chancel is a 19th-century sundial from a previous church.	II
