= St John the Evangelist's Church, Osmotherley =

Coordinates: 54.2300°N 3.1077°W

St John the Evangelist's Church
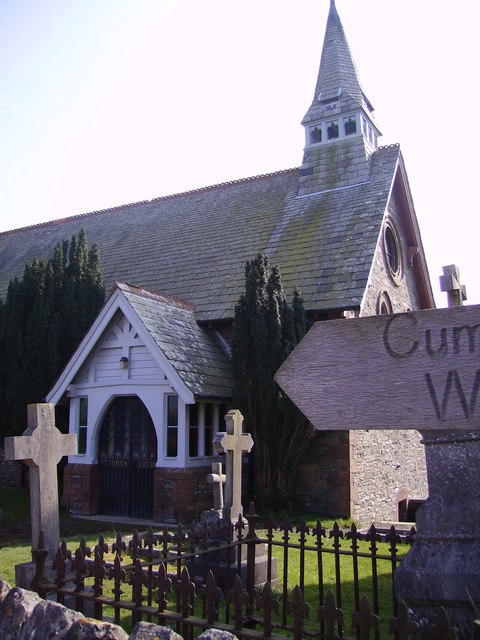
- West end of St John the Evangelist's Church, Osmotherley

- Location in South Lakeland Location in Cumbria
- OS grid reference: SD 279 821
- Location: Osmotherley, Cumbria
- Country: England
- Denomination: Anglican
- Website: St John the Evangelist, Osmotherley

History
- Status: Parish church
- Dedication: Saint John the Evangelist

Architecture
- Functional status: Active
- Heritage designation: Grade II
- Designated: 5 March 1990
- Architect: Paley and Austin
- Architectural type: Church
- Style: Gothic Revival
- Groundbreaking: 1873
- Completed: 1874

Specifications
- Materials: Slate with sandstone dressings

Administration
- Province: York
- Diocese: Carlisle
- Archdeaconry: Westmoreland and Furness
- Deanery: Furness
- Parish: St Mary with Holy Trinity, Ulverston

Clergy
- Vicar: Revd Canon Alan C. Bing

St John the Evangelist's Church is in the village of Osmotherley, Cumbria, England. It is an active Anglican parish church in the deanery of Furness, the archdeaconry of Westmorland and Furness, and the diocese of Carlisle. Its benefice is united with St Mary with Holy Trinity, Ulverston. The church is recorded in the National Heritage List for England as a designated Grade II listed building.

== History ==
The church was built in 1873–74 to a design by the Lancaster partnership of Paley and Austin. It provided seating for about 150 people, and cost about £1,400 (equivalent to £137,000 in 2025).

== Architecture ==
St John's is constructed in coursed slate rubble with sandstone dressings. The roofs are slated, with tiles on the crest. Its plan consists of a four-bay nave and a chancel in one range, a north porch, and a south vestry. The chancel has an apsidal east end. At the west end of the church is a bellcote with a spirelet. All the windows are lancets, other than two square-headed windows in the vestry, and a rose window above two lancets at the west end. The porch consists of a wooden frame on stone bases, and it is gabled. The bellcote is wooden and hung with slates. Its spirelet is broached at the base, and contains small lucarnes.

== See also ==
- List of ecclesiastical works by Paley and Austin
