= Broughton Beck =

Village in Cumbria, England

Coordinates: 54.22°N 03.10°W

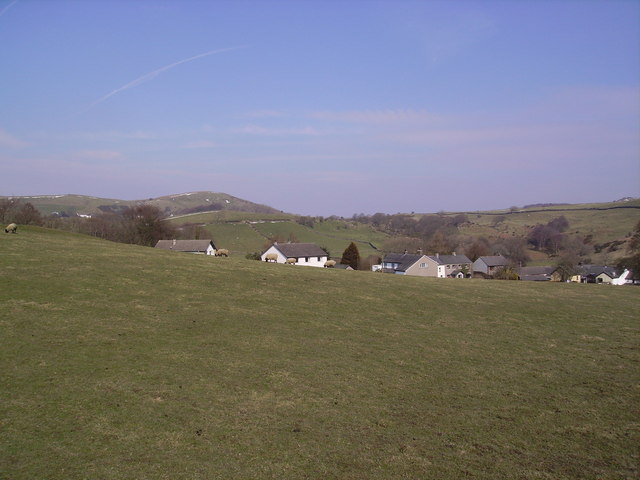
- Broughton Beck

- Location in the former South Lakeland district Location within Cumbria
- OS grid reference: SD2882
- Civil parish: Osmotherley
- Unitary authority: Westmorland and Furness
- Ceremonial county: Cumbria
- Region: North West
- Country: England
- Sovereign state: United Kingdom
- Post town: ULVERSTON
- Postcode district: LA12
- Dialling code: 01229
- Police: Cumbria
- Fire: Cumbria
- Ambulance: North West
- UK Parliament: Barrow and Furness

Broughton Beck is a village in the Westmorland and Furness Unitary Authority of Cumbria, England. The village has two sections; one part is on the B5281 Ulverston to Gawthwaite Road, the other part of the village is about 250 yards away, to the north. In the past the village served the farms in the surrounding area; there used to be a public house, a shop, a garage, a blacksmith and a mill. The mill building was bequeathed to the village in 1937 and now serves as Broughton Beck Village Hall, known as 'The Mill Room.

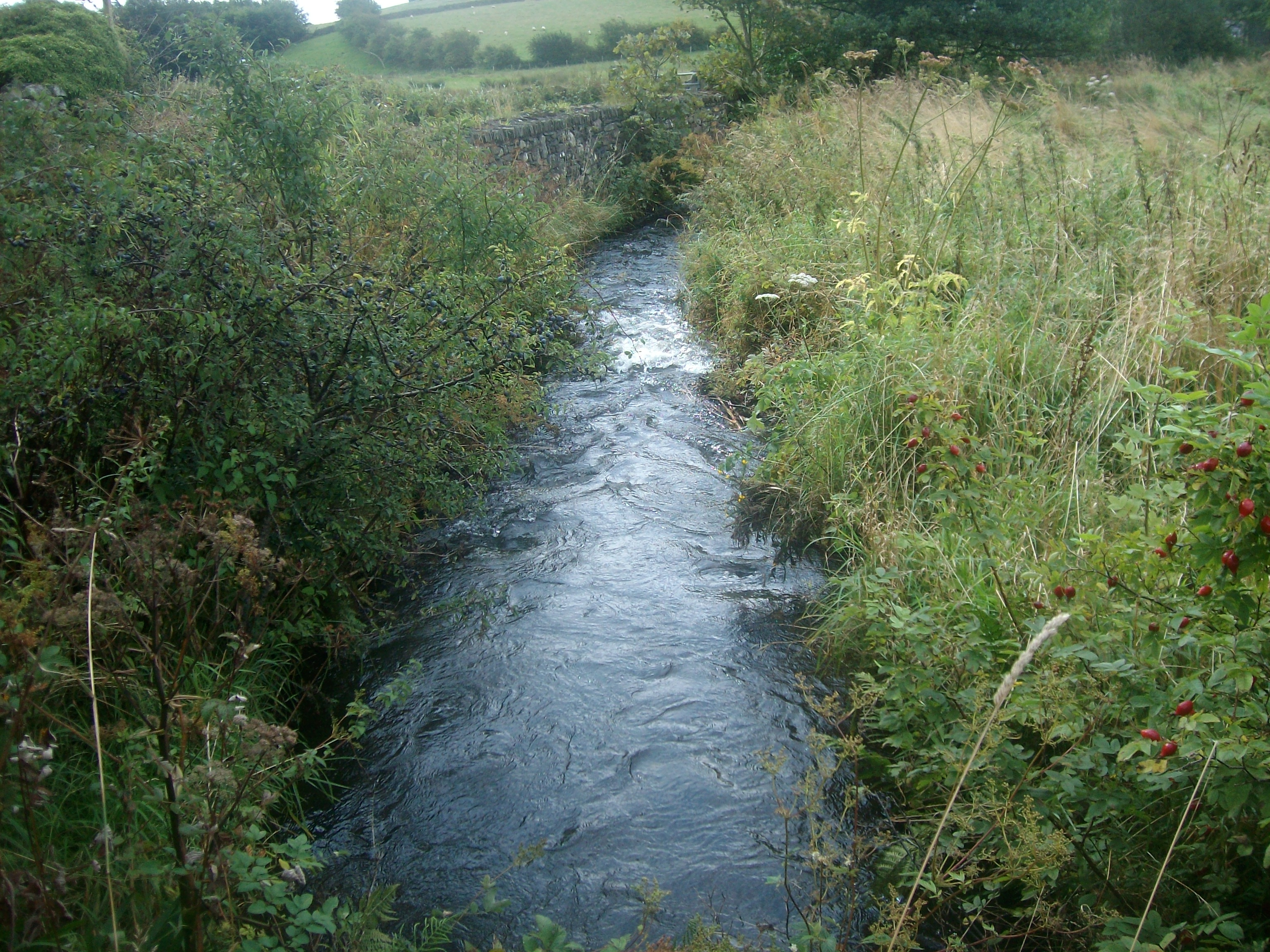
The beck from which the town lends its name
