= River Leven, Cumbria =

River in Cumbria, England

River Leven
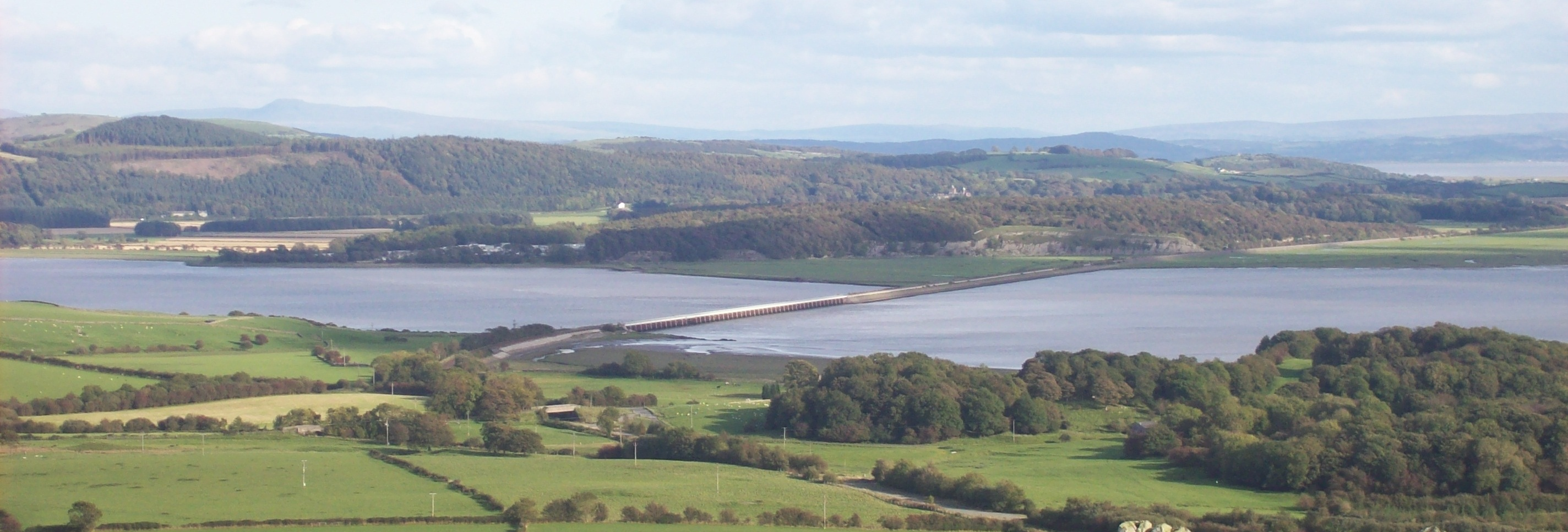
- The Leven at its estuary stage, near Ulverston

- Location within Cumbria

Location
- Country: United Kingdom
- County: Cumbria

Physical characteristics
- Source: Windermere
- Mouth: Morecambe Bay
  - coordinates: 54.2345°N 3.0491°W
- Length: 13 km (8.1 mi)

Basin features
- Tributaries
  - left: Rusland Pool

The River Leven (pron. /ˈlɛvən/ LEV-ən) is a short river in the ceremonial county of Cumbria, falling within the historic boundaries of Lancashire. It drains Windermere from its southernmost point and flows for approximately 8 miles (13 km) into the northern reaches of Morecambe Bay. The river and its estuary are the boundary between the Cartmel Peninsula and Furness Peninsula and is part of North Lonsdale, also known as Lancashire North of the Sands.

The upriver limit of tidal flow is close to the village of Haverthwaite. Also at this point is to be found Low Wood Bridge which, until the coming of the railways, was the first bridging point across the river. The Leven is navigable upstream as far as Low Wood, and downstream from Windermere to Newby Bridge.

Apart from Newby Bridge and Haverthwaite, the only other settlements on the Leven are the villages of Backbarrow and Greenodd. The river's steep fall around Backbarrow allowed industrial use of the river for the ultramarine mill and also a small hydroelectric generator at Backbarrow ironworks.

The River Leven has one significant tributary, Rusland Pool, which drains a substantial part of Grizedale Forest and the Rusland Valley into the upper tidal section of the river. The smaller River Crake flows into the Leven at Greenodd. The Leven is a noted salmon river. At spawning time the fish can be seen jumping up the waterfalls at Backbarrow. The river is popular with kayakers due to the continuous grade III+ rapids found between Newby Bridge and Haverthwaite and a relatively stable water level sustained by Windermere.

In 1903 a train crossing the railway bridge over the river was derailed by high winds during the Ulysses Storm.

The Leven Estuary is one of the six main estuaries in the traditional county of Lancashire.
