= St Mary's Church, Ulverston =

Coordinates: 54.1989°N 3.0915°W

Ulverston Parish Church
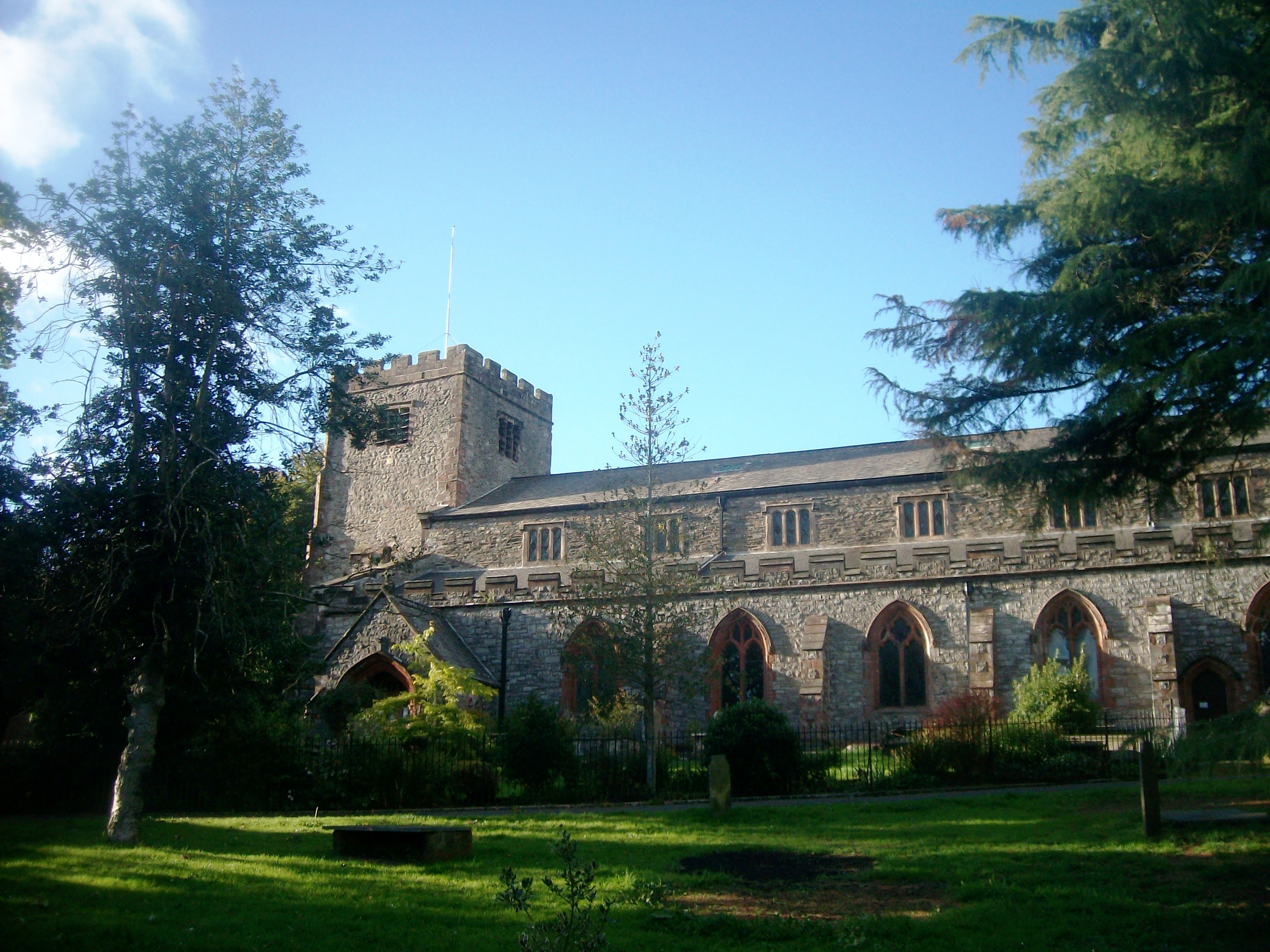
- Ulverston Parish Church from the south

- Location in South Lakeland Location in Cumbria
- OS grid reference: SD 290,787
- Location: Ulverston, Cumbria
- Country: England
- Denomination: Anglican
- Churchmanship: Evangelical
- Website: www.ulverstonparishchurch.org

History
- Status: Parish church

Architecture
- Functional status: Active
- Heritage designation: Grade II*
- Designated: 2 March 1950
- Architect(s): E. G. Paley and successors (restorations)
- Architectural type: Church
- Style: Gothic, Gothic Revival

Specifications
- Materials: Sandstone and limestone, Slate roofs

Administration
- Province: York
- Diocese: Carlisle
- Archdeaconry: Westmoreland and Furness
- Deanery: Furness
- Parish: St Mary with Holy Trinity, Ulverston

Clergy
- Rector: Revd Madi Smith

Ulverston Parish Church is in Church Walk, Ulverston, Cumbria, England. It is an active Anglican parish church in the deanery of Furness, the archdeaconry of Westmorland and Furness, and the diocese of Carlisle. Its benefice is united with that of St John, Osmotherley. The church is recorded in the National Heritage List for England as a designated Grade II* listed building.

== History ==
It is not known when the first church was built on the site. The oldest part of the present building is the reset south door, from the 12th century, which accords with a popular (though seemingly unsubstantiated) foundation date of 1111. The tower of the present church was built between 1540 and 1560, replacing an earlier church which, it is said, was damaged when its steeple fell following a storm, damaging the rest if the building. The church was restored and enlarged in 1804. In 1864–66 it was rebuilt, other than the medieval tower, by the Lancaster architect E. G. Paley, providing seating for about 1,400 people. Due to the extensive series of 19th century reconstructions, the dating of much of the building is dubious. For example, Historic England dates the arcades to the 1804 restoration, while the Church of England regards them as late medieval. The successors in Paley's practice, Austin and Paley, extended the chancel, added fittings to the interior, and built a south porch in 1903–04. The same firm converted the south chancel aisle into a war memorial in 1923. The interior of the church was reordered in 2008–09; this included the provision of a refreshment and meeting area.

== Architecture ==
=== Exterior ===
The church is constructed in sandstone and limestone rubble with red sandstone dressings and slate roofs. Its plan consists of seven-bay nave with a clerestory, north and south aisles, a south porch, a chancel, and a west tower. The tower, dating from the 16th century, is in three stages, with buttresses at the angles, and an embattled parapet. It contains a west doorway, above which is a three-light window containing Perpendicular-style tracery. The bell openings have three lights, are louvred and have hoodmoulds. The north wall of the nave contains pointed windows with Perpendicular tracery, all with two lights, other than the western window, which has three lights. The west window has five lights. The windows in the clerestory have flat heads and three lights, and are mullioned. The south wall contains a priest's door, with four windows to its left and two to the right; all have two lights. The porch is gabled and has a cross finial. The east window in the chancel has five lights. The inner doorway dates from the 12th century, it is in Norman style, and has zigzag decoration. Hyde and Pevsner in the Buildings of England series state that it is neither complete, nor is it in its original position.

=== Interior ===
The arcades are in seven bays and are carried on octagonal piers. The chancel is above the level of the nave. In the chancel is a double sedilia and a piscina. The choir stalls are in carved oak, and oak screens divide the chancel from the organ chamber and vestry to the north, and from the chapel to the south. A three-manual organ was built in 1866 by Thomas Wilkinson of Kendal, replacing an earlier instrument. A 20th century organ by the Lancashire builder Thomas Pendlebury was moved from a church elsewhere and was installed in St Mary's in 1972. The stained glass in the east window is by William Wailes, and windows elsewhere are by Heaton, Butler and Bayne. The church contains a number of monuments, the oldest, erected in 1588, is to William Sandys, who died in 1559. There is a ring of six bells, all cast in 1836 by Thomas Mears II of the Whitechapel Bell Foundry.

== See also ==
- Grade II* listed buildings in Westmorland and Furness
- Listed buildings in Ulverston
- List of ecclesiastical works by E. G. Paley
- List of ecclesiastical works by Paley and Austin
- List of ecclesiastical works by Austin and Paley (1895–1914)
- List of ecclesiastical works by Austin and Paley (1916–44)
