= Osmotherley, Cumbria =

Civil parish in Cumbria, England

Coordinates: 54.2242°N 3.1233°W

Osmotherley
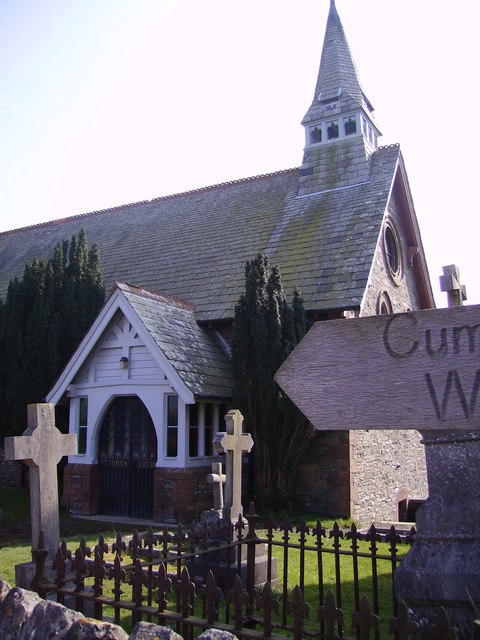
- St John the Evangelist's Church

- Location in South Lakeland Location within Cumbria
- Population: 302 (2011 census)
- Civil parish: Osmotherley
- Unitary authority: Westmorland and Furness
- Ceremonial county: Cumbria
- Region: North West
- Country: England
- Sovereign state: United Kingdom
- Post town: Ulverston
- Postcode district: LA12
- UK Parliament: Barrow and Furness

Osmotherley is a civil parish in Westmorland and Furness, Cumbria, England, extending north from Ulverston. The village of Broughton Beck is the largest settlement in the parish. Before local government reorganization in 1974, Osmotherley was in Lancashire. Since 2003 it has a joint parish council with Mansriggs and Egton with Newland.

The only listed building in the parish is St John the Evangelist's Church (grade II).

At the 2011 census Osmotherley was grouped with Mansriggs giving a total population of 302.
