= Greenodd =

Village in Cumbria, England

Coordinates: 54.234°N 3.054°W

- Village
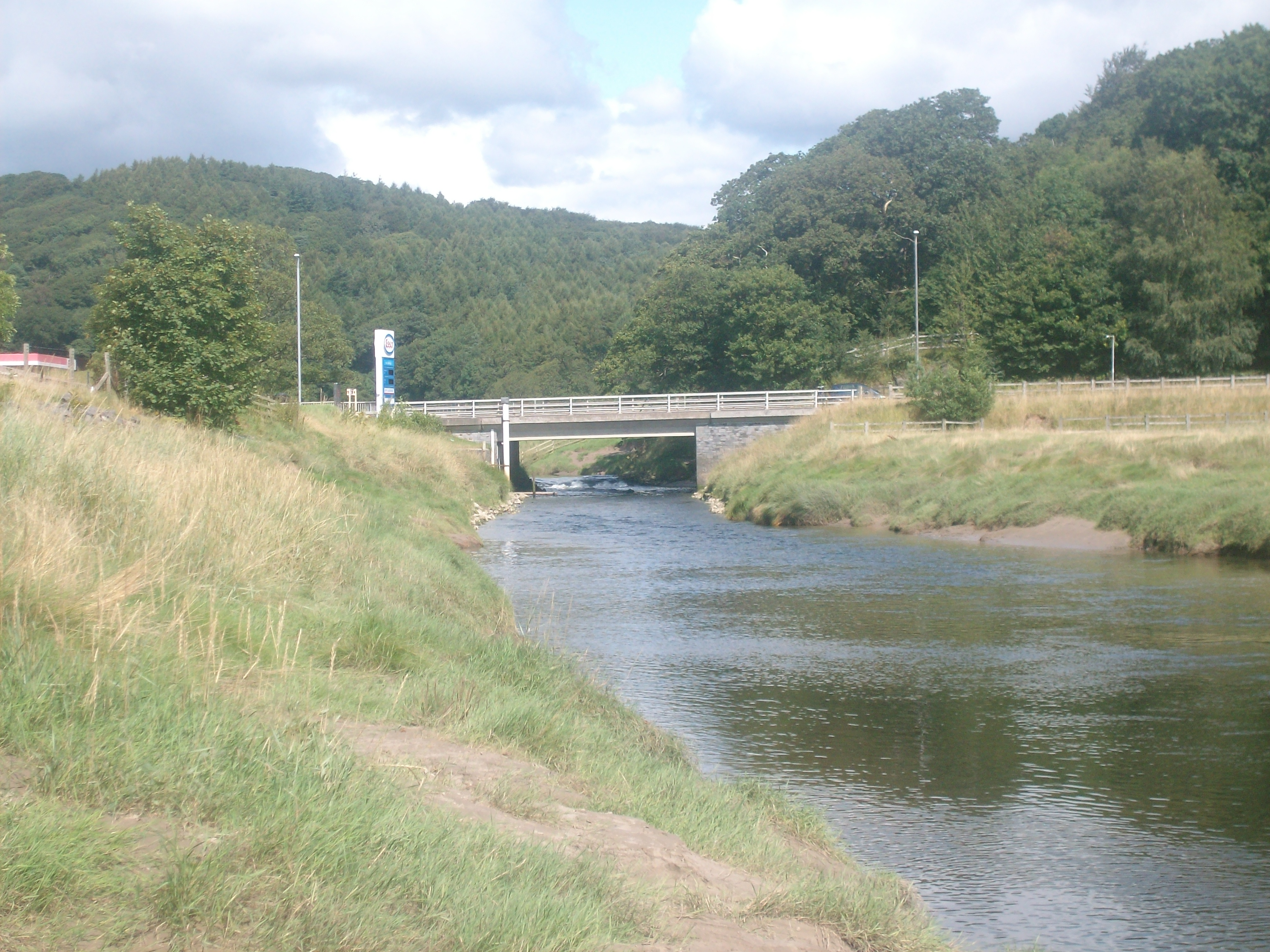
- The River Crake running past Greenodd

- Location in the former district of South Lakeland Location within Cumbria
- OS grid reference: SD313825
- Civil parish: Egton with Newland
- Unitary authority: Westmorland and Furness
- Ceremonial county: Cumbria
- Region: North West
- Country: England
- Sovereign state: United Kingdom
- Post town: ULVERSTON
- Postcode district: LA12
- Dialling code: 01229
- Police: Cumbria
- Fire: Cumbria
- Ambulance: North West
- UK Parliament: Barrow and Furness

Greenodd is a village in Westmorland and Furness, Cumbria, England, 3 miles (4.8 km) north-east of Ulverston. At the northern end of the Furness peninsula, it was historically part of Lancashire.

Greenodd sits within the civil parish of Egton with Newland at the junction of the A5092 and A590. Just outside the southern boundary of the Lake District national park, it is where the River Crake (fed by Coniston Water) flows into the River Leven (fed by Windermere), beginning the Leven Estuary.

== History ==
The name Greenodd is of Scandinavian origin, the odd meaning ness (headland) in this case (the name translates literally as 'The Green Promontory'). Swedish toponymist Eilert Ekwall speculated that the name was not an old one, as 'odd' remained part of the Lancashire dialect until at least the early 20th century. In the late-18th and early-19th centuries Greenodd was a significant port; a creek-port of Lancaster. Exports included copper ore from Coniston, locally quarried limestone, and gunpowder from the nearby settlement of Backbarrow. Sugar, raw cotton and coal are listed in historical documents as some of the imports. Greenodd was also a shipbuilding centre with vessels up to 200 tons being constructed. On the darker side it is likely that Greenodd was involved in the North American slave trade. Today there are no signs of the former commercial activities. The Ship Inn, previously a warehouse on the quayside, is one of the few reminders of Greenodd's illustrious past.

In 2008, Greenodd was involved in a battle to save its post office. The government announced in late 2006 that it would shutting 2,500 post offices nationwide, citing the rising losses and fewer number of people using them as the primary reasons. The inhabitants of Greenodd protested at the move, and even gained the support of the MP from the neighbouring constituency of Westmorland and Lonsdale, Tim Farron. Farron put his name to a petition which gained 6,800 signatures, but it was to no avail.

== Transport ==
Until the 1980s, the A590, connecting Furness to much of the rest of the country, ran along the village's narrow main street, causing traffic problems for the small village. These were alleviated by building a dual carriageway bypass to take the traffic over two new bridges across the River Crake. The south end of Main Street was stopped up, leaving the village effectively a cul-de-sac.

Greenodd railway station was served by the Lakeside branch of the Furness Railway from 1869 until its closure in 1965. Today there is no trace of the railway, the station having been demolished to make way for a dual-carriageway road. Greenodd is now also on the W2W Cycle Route between Walney and Wearmouth.

== See also ==
- Listed buildings in Colton, Cumbria
- Listed buildings in Egton with Newland
