= Mansriggs =

Civil parish in Cumbria, England

Coordinates: 54.2172°N 3.0858°W

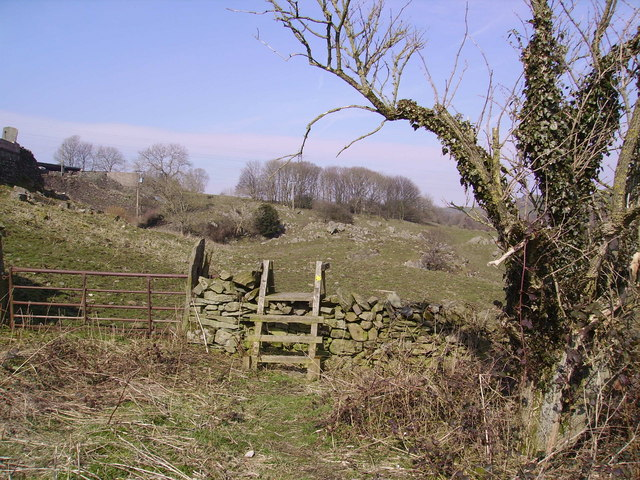

- Location in South Lakeland Location within Cumbria
- Population: 42 (2001)
- Civil parish: Mansriggs
- Unitary authority: Westmorland and Furness
- Ceremonial county: Cumbria
- Region: North West
- Country: England
- Sovereign state: United Kingdom
- Post town: Ulverston
- Postcode district: LA12

Mansriggs is a settlement and civil parish in the Westmorland and Furness unitary authority area, in the ceremonial county of Cumbria, England. Because of its small population, in the 2011 census the parish was grouped with Osmotherley. It has a joint parish council with Egton with Newland and Osmotherley. Mansriggs was Manslarig in 1520. Mansriggs Hall is a two-storey farmhouse in the parish.

The parish contains one listed building, a bridge, and one scheduled monument, a former blast furnace, blacking mill, and associated buildings.
