= Blawith and Subberthwaite =

Civil parish in Cumbria, England

Coordinates: 54.285°N 3.095°W

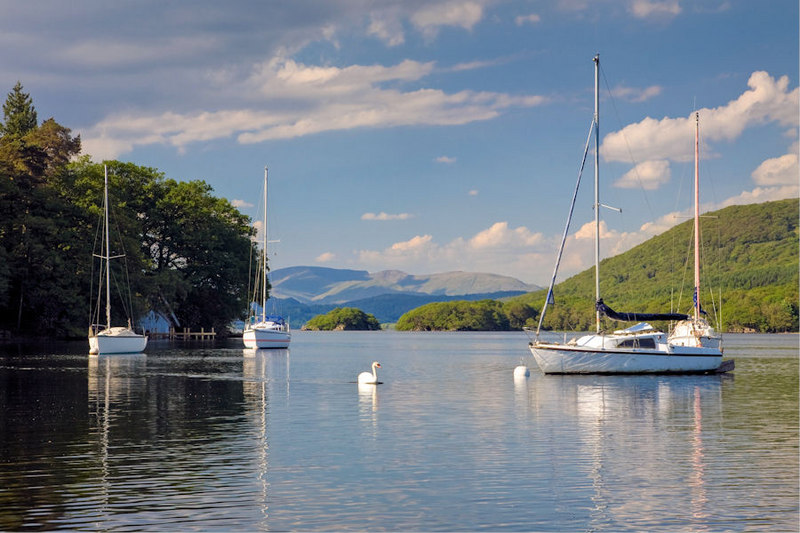
- Coniston South Moorings

- Location in South Lakeland Location within Cumbria
- Population: 265 (2011, including Torver)
- OS grid reference: SD2888
- Civil parish: Blawith and Subberthwaite
- Unitary authority: Westmorland and Furness
- Ceremonial county: Cumbria
- Region: North West
- Country: England
- Sovereign state: United Kingdom
- Post town: ULVERSTON
- Postcode district: LA12
- Dialling code: 01229
- Police: Cumbria
- Fire: Cumbria
- Ambulance: North West
- UK Parliament: Westmorland and Lonsdale

Blawith and Subberthwaite is a civil parish in the Westmorland and Furness Unitary Authority of Cumbria, England. It is situated in the Lake District National Park, and includes the villages of Blawith and Subberthwaite. In the 2001 census the parish had a population of 189. At the 2011 census Blawith and Subberthwaite was grouped with Torver giving a total population of 265.

Blawith has an area of 2,995 acres on the west side of the Crake and the lower end of Coniston Water which is about a mile and a half north of Blawith. The village is bordered to the west and north by Blawith Common, a large area of rough grazing which is used by those who hold common rights. Parts of the common are designated as having of Special Scientific Interest.

The name Blawith should be pronounced Blaath, which means wolf, creatures once common in the area.

In 1870–72 Blawith was described as:

"a township-chapelry in Ulverston parish, Lancashire; on the river Crake. Real property, £1,082. Pop., 193. Houses, 39."

In 1870–72 Subberthwaite was described as:

"a township in Ulverstone parish, Lancashire; Acres, 1,246. Real property, £764. Pop., 152. Houses, 29."

== History ==
The parish was formed on 1 April 1986 from the parishes of "Blawith" and "Subberthwaite".

The church in Blawith is St John the Baptist's; it is a redundant Anglican church in the settlement. A chapel of ease was built in the 16th century and was rebuilt in 1749. The ruins can still be seen and are surrounded by a small graveyard. A new church was built across the road from the chapel in 1863. This later church was closed in 1988 and was sold to be converted into a dwelling in 2012.

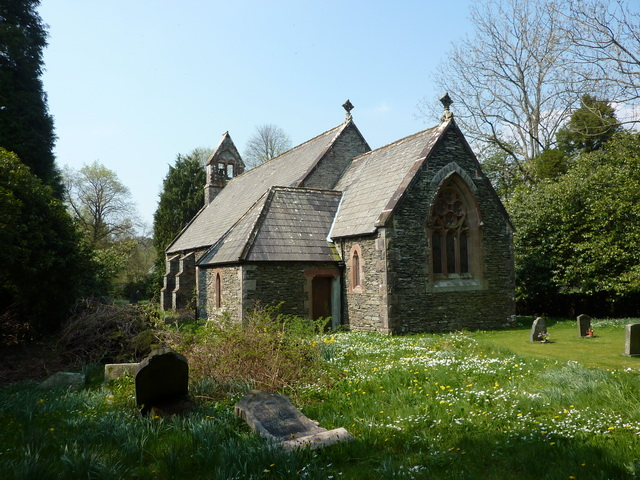
St John the Baptist, Blawith

"The influence of the monastic houses, notably Furness Abbey and Cartmel Priory, was central to the medieval development of the area, through their control of much of the farmland and fostering of industries including metal-ore mining and smelting, and wool production."

== Population ==
Blawith has a population of 193 and Subberthwaite has a population of 152. By the time of the 2011 Census the parishes had been combined to give a new total population of 265.

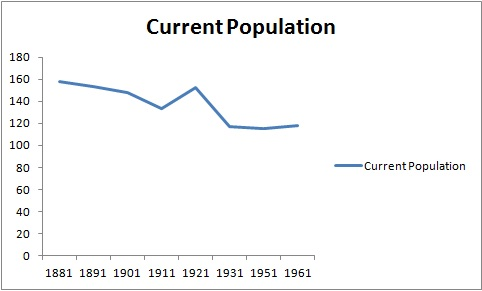
A line graph of population, 1881–1961

Most people who live in the area are aged between 30 and 59. This tends to be couples who are likely to have children, due to there being a great number of people aged up to 14 years in the area and few single parents. In 1995 it was recorded that there were 0 single parents and 32 children aged 0–14.

== Occupations ==
The 1881 census lists occupations of males and females in the division and its registration counties. It names the main occupation in Blawith and Subberthwaite as agriculture, with 26 males working in this sector and 1 female. Most worked as agricultural labourers, farm servants or cottagers, with 14 of the 26 males working in this area and 1 female. 22 females living in the area were domestic indoor servants.

== Housing ==
- Blawith housing – 39
- Subberthwaite housing – 29

The total number of houses in Blawith increased from 32 in 1901 to 39 in 1961. 2011 census data lists 92 households in Blawith and Subberthwaite that are families and 76 households that were not child dependent. "The average house price in Blawith and Subberthwaite is below the UK average. There is a high percentage of the houses being priced between £100,000 and £250,000 in March 2013. Most expensive being detached houses which tend to be around £300,000."

A parkland landscape has developed around Coniston Water which is associated with larger estates and houses.

== Tourism ==
Blawith is a quiet area, but it does have holiday parks and cottages such as Crake Valley Holiday Park for people who are visiting the area. It is central to many attractions, being within five miles of Coniston Water, Grizedale Forest Park, the Aquarium of the Lakes at Lakeside, and Ulverston with its Laurel and Hardy Museum. Go Ape ropes course, four miles away, is a day trip for tourists visiting Blawith and Subberthwaite, and Bigland Hall Equestrian is five miles away. Local pubs in the vicinity include The Red Lion, suitable for families.

== Education and transport ==
The nearest school to Blawith is Penny Bridge CofE School Greenodd, Ulverston, 4 miles away. This is a mixed gender primary school aged from 4 to 11. The school only has 90 pupils enrolled. It is known as a good school due to it scoring '1' on the Ofsted report. The majority of people living in Blawith and Subberthwaite have a high level of education. According to the neighbourhood statistics, in 2011, 115 people achieved Level 4 qualifications and above.

Children living in Blawith and Subberthwaite have to rely on parents or public transport to get to school due to its location. The 'X12' bus goes through Blawith to Ulverston, where the school is located. The timetable includes school days only, enabling children to get to school due to there not being schools in walking distance in the parish of Blawith and Subberthwaite.

== See also ==
- Listed buildings in Blawith and Subberthwaite
