= Lowick, Cumbria =

Village and civil parish in Cumbria, England

Coordinates: 54.268°N 3.083°W

Lowick
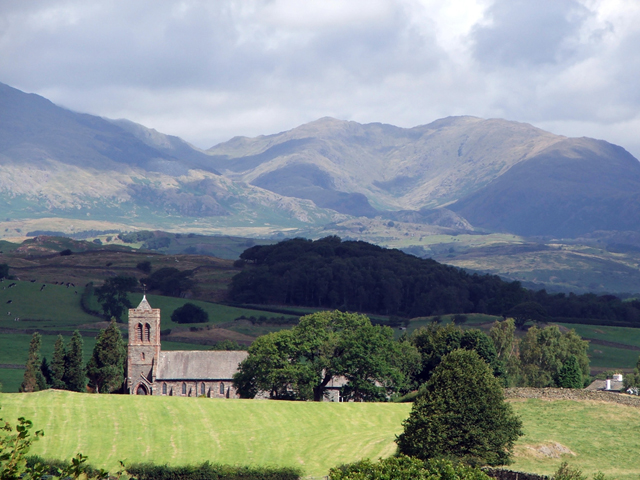
- St Luke's Church

- Location in South Lakeland Location within Cumbria
- Population: 227 (2011)
- OS grid reference: SD2986
- Civil parish: Lowick
- Unitary authority: Westmorland and Furness
- Ceremonial county: Cumbria
- Region: North West
- Country: England
- Sovereign state: United Kingdom
- Post town: ULVERSTON
- Postcode district: LA12
- Dialling code: 01229
- Police: Cumbria
- Fire: Cumbria
- Ambulance: North West
- UK Parliament: Barrow and Furness

Lowick is a village and civil parish in the Westmorland and Furness district of the ceremonial county of Cumbria, England. Prior to 1 April 1974 it was part of Lancashire, the change being as a result of the Local Government Act 1972. From 1974 to 2023 it was in South Lakeland district. The village appears in records as early as 1202 as Lofwik, and later as Laufwik: the name derives from the Old Norse "Lauf-vík" (English: Leafy Bay).

In the 2001 census the parish had a population of 224, increasing slightly at the 2011 census to 227.

The parish is made up of several small hamlets including Beck Bottom, Lowick Bridge, Lowick Green and Woodgate. Lowick Green has a red phone box, one of a number surviving in rural Britain.

For hundreds of years, Lowick was a two-pub parish, with the "Red Lion" at Lowick Bridge and the "Farmer's Arms" at Lowick Green. However, from 2021, the Farmer's Arms is run as a community hub.

The village had its own primary school until 2004 when Cumbria County Council closed the school with 18 pupils. Numbers had fallen increasingly over the latter years and a number of local families already sent their children to larger schools nearby.

There is an annual event in the village called the Lowick Show, known locally as the L'al Royal, which attracts visitors from nearby towns and villages. There are games, stalls, cattle, ferret and dog shows, as well as competitions for bakery, and arts and crafts.

== See also ==
- Listed buildings in Lowick, Cumbria
