= Egton with Newland =

Civil parish in Cumbria, England

Coordinates: 54.234°N 3.055°W

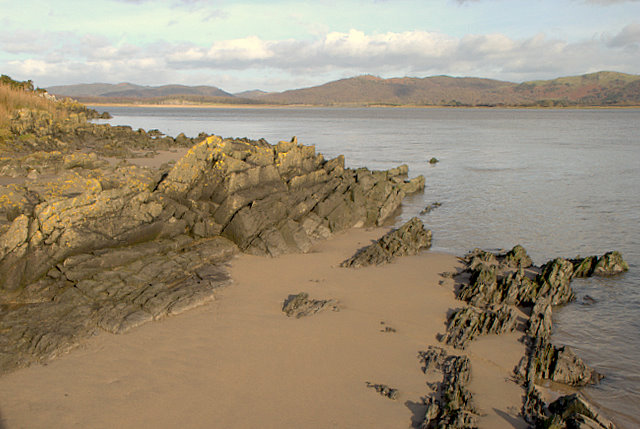
- The River Leven near Ashes Point

- Location in South Lakeland Location within Cumbria
- Population: 817 (2011)
- OS grid reference: SD3182
- Civil parish: Egton with Newland
- Unitary authority: Westmorland and Furness
- Ceremonial county: Cumbria
- Region: North West
- Country: England
- Sovereign state: United Kingdom
- Post town: ULVERSTON
- Postcode district: LA12
- Dialling code: 01229
- Police: Cumbria
- Fire: Cumbria
- Ambulance: North West
- UK Parliament: Barrow and Furness

Egton with Newland, sometimes written as "Egton-with-Newland", is a civil parish in the Westmorland and Furness Unitary Authority of the English county of Cumbria. It includes the villages of Greenodd and Penny Bridge, and the hamlets of Arrad Foot, Newland and Newland Bottom. In the 2001 census the parish had a population of 898, decreasing at the 2011 census to 817.

It has a joint parish council with the parishes of Mansriggs and Osmotherley.

== See also ==
- Listed buildings in Egton with Newland
- St Mary's Church, Penny Bridge
