= Claughton, Wyre =

English village and parish also known as Claughton-on-Brock

Coordinates: 53.876°N 2.722°W

Claughton: Claughton-on-Brock
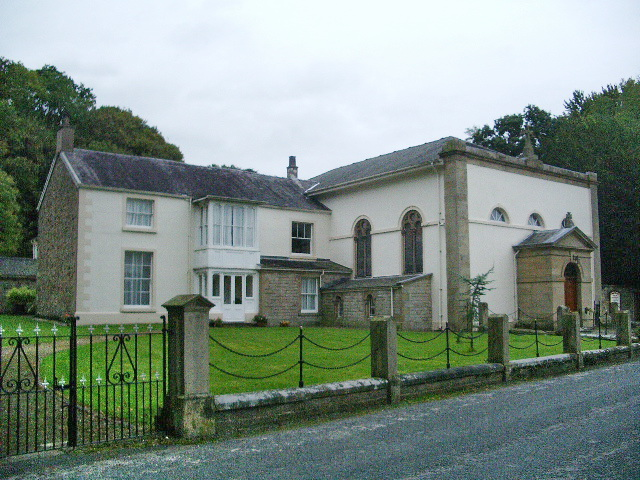
- St Thomas the Apostle Church

- Shown within Wyre Borough Location within Lancashire
- Population: 1,033 (2021)
- OS grid reference: SD525424
  - London: 314km
- Civil parish: Claughton
- District: Wyre
- Shire county: Lancashire
- Region: North West
- Country: England
- Sovereign state: United Kingdom
- Post town: PRESTON
- Postcode district: PR3
- Dialling code: 01995
- Police: Lancashire
- Fire: Lancashire
- Ambulance: North West
- UK Parliament: Lancaster and Wyre
- Website: Claughton Parish Council

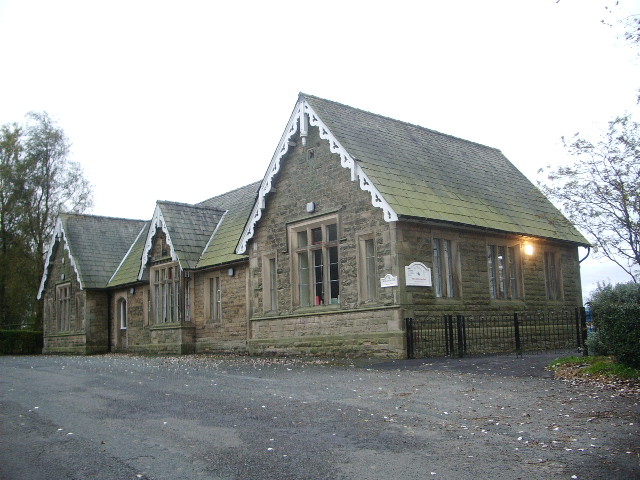
Claughton RC Primary School

Claughton (/ˈklaɪtən/ KLY-tən) is a sparse village and civil parish in the county of Lancashire in the north of England, in the Borough of Wyre. The population of the civil parish at the 2021 census was 1,033. It is sometimes called Claughton-on-Brock to distinguish it from another Claughton in Lancashire in the Lune valley between Lancaster and Hornby.

The village has the Roman Catholic church of St Thomas Apostle and a Roman Catholic primary school – St Mary's. But there is no Church of England presence, which is unusual for a parish in England. The nearest Anglican church is in the neighbouring parish, Barnacre-with-Bonds.

== History ==
The parish was historically in the Amounderness Hundred. It lies between the Calder and Brock valleys. The A6 road runs through the west end of the parish, a short distance south of the town of Garstang.

Claughton is mentioned in the Domesday Book of 1086, appearing as Clactune. Later variations include Clacton, 1184; Clagton and Clahton, 1253; Claghton, 1284. The name is believed to be of Saxon origin, meaning 'farm on the hill'.

The Fitzherbert-Brockholes family have been associated with Claughton on Brock since the time of Edward II. They were regarded as recusants during and after the Reformation. The family has a large agricultural estate with 16 farms, which date back to 1395, the oldest being Manor House Farm is believed to be the 'Farm on the hill' from which the name Claughton originates. The parish had a public house, the Brockholes Arms, which closed for business in 2013. Afterwards, the building was converted into an Italian restaurant, which has also since closed for business. In 2018 the Brockholes Arms reopened as a public house.

Another old house of Claughton is Claughton Green, which was once part of the Claughton Green Estate before being bought by the Fitzherbert-Brockholes family. Adjacent to Manor House Farm, the large whitewashed house originates from the 18th century.

== Transport ==
The village has no public transport and the nearest bus service is in Catterall.

The nearest railway station is Preston.

== Education ==
There are multiple local primary and secondary schools available from Claughton, including: Saint Mary's RC Primary School in Claughton, John Cross Church of England Primary School in Bilsborrow, Whitechapel Primary School and Calder Vale CE Primary. Secondary schools include Garstang Community Academy, Broughton High School, Our Lady's Catholic High School, Fulwood and Saint Cecilia's Roman Catholic Technology College in Longridge. Colleges are in abundance in the area, including: Cardinal Newman College, Preston's College, Blackpool Sixth, Blackpool and Fylde, Lancaster Girls Grammar, Lancaster Royal Grammar and Myerscough College.

Universities in a 20-mile (30 km) radius include: Lancaster University, University of Central Lancashire in Preston, the Lancaster campus of the University of Cumbria, Myerscough College and Blackpool and the Fylde University Centre.

== Geography ==
The parish of Claughton lies on the northern bank of the River Brock, extending from the A6 to the foot of Bleasdale Moor, in the Borough of Wyre in Lancashire. Major roads in the parish include the A6, B6430, May Lane and Lydiate Lane.

== See also ==
- Listed buildings in Claughton, Wyre
