= Bonds, Lancashire =

Coordinates: 53.897°N 2.771°W

Bonds
- Village
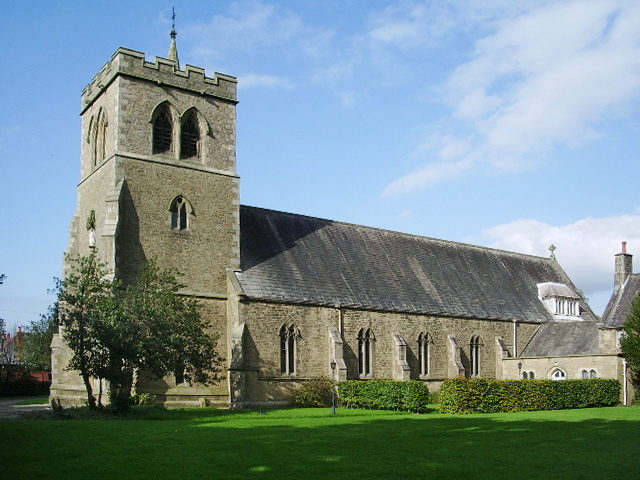
- Roman Catholic church of SS Mary and Michael

- Shown within Wyre Borough Location within Lancashire
- OS grid reference: SD493448
- Civil parish: Barnacre-with-Bonds
- District: Wyre
- Shire county: Lancashire
- Region: North West
- Country: England
- Sovereign state: United Kingdom
- Post town: Preston
- Postcode district: PR3
- Dialling code: 01995
- Police: Lancashire
- Fire: Lancashire
- Ambulance: North West
- UK Parliament: Lancaster and Wyre
- Website: Barnacre-with-Bonds Parish Council

Bonds is a village in Lancashire, England. It lies immediately south of Garstang town centre, on the opposite bank of the River Wyre. It is bounded by the Lancaster Canal to the south and west. Garstang, Bonds, Bowgreave and Catterall form an almost continuous built-up area, which was bypassed by the A6 road in 1928. (Some sources state, incorrectly, that this occurred in 1926.). While it is often regarded as a de facto suburb of Garstang, Bonds forms part of a different civil parish: Barnacre-with-Bonds.

The Roman Catholic church of St Mary and St Michael is a Gothic Revival building consecrated in 1858, superseding a chapel built in 1784.)

1/2 mile (800 m) east of the village is the ruin of Greenhalgh Castle, built in 1490 for Thomas Stanley.

== Transport ==
Transport in the village as of April 2026 is run by Stagecoach Cumbria and North Lancashire. 3 routes serve the village. The 40/41 to Preston or to Lancaster/Morecambe. The third route is the 42 to Blackpool or Lancaster.

== See also ==
- Listed buildings in Barnacre-with-Bonds
