= Listed buildings in Barnacre-with-Bonds =

Barnacre-with-Bonds is a civil parish in the Wyre district of Lancashire, England. It contains 24 listed buildings that are recorded in the National Heritage List for England. All the listed buildings are designated at Grade II, the lowest of the three grades, which is applied to "buildings of national importance and special interest". The parish contains the settlements of Bonds, Calder Vale, and Bowgreave and is otherwise rural. The Lancaster Canal, the River Wyre and its tributary the River Calder pass through the parish and many of the bridges crossing them are listed. Also listed is the aqueduct carrying the canal over the River Wyre. The other listed buildings include farmhouses and other houses, churches, a Quaker meeting house, a former sawmill, a milestone, and a pump in a farmyard,

== Buildings ==
Name and location	Photograph	Date	Notes
Greenhalgh Castle Farmhouse; 53.89990°N 2.76037°W	—	Late 17th century	A sandstone farmhouse with a steep slate roof in two storeys with an attic. There is a single-storey gabled porch, and the windows are mullioned.
Landskill Farmhouse; 53.90674°N 2.70455°W	—	1692	The farmhouse is in pebbledashed stone with sandstone dressings and a slate roof. There are two storeys and three bays. The windows have mullions, and the doorway has a moulded surround with a shaped inscribed lintel.
Bonds Fold Farmhouse and Greenhalgh Cottage; 53.89860°N 2.76903°W	—	1694	The farmhouse and attached cottage are in sandstone with a slate roof and have two storeys. The farmhouse has two bays, sash windows, and a doorway with a chamfered surround and an inscribed battlemented lintel. The cottage to the right dates from the early 19th century, and has one bay. It has modern windows, a doorway with plain reveals, and a modern timber porch.
Milestone; 53.89091°N 2.76900°W	—	Late 18th century	The milestone is in painted sandstone. It has a half-oval plan and a rounded top. There is an inscription of "BARNACRE" around the base. On the sides are cast iron panels with moulded borders inscribed with the distances in miles to Garstang and to Preston.
Ray Lane Bridge; 53.88833°N 2.74899°W	—	1797	This is bridge No. 54 over the Lancaster Canal, and carries Ray Lane over the canal. It is in sandstone and consists of a single elliptical arch. The bridge has a stepped keystone below a solid parapet with a rounded top.
Dobson's Bridge; 53.89209°N 2.75173°W	—	1797	This is bridge No. 55, an accommodation bridge over the Lancaster Canal. It is in sandstone and consists of a single elliptical arch. The bridge has a stepped keystone below a solid parapet with a rounded top.
Turner's Bridge; 53.89577°N 2.75713°W	—	1797	This is bridge No. 56, an accommodation bridge over the Lancaster Canal. It is in sandstone and consists of a single elliptical arch. The bridge has a stepped keystone below a solid parapet with a rounded top.
Greenhalgh Castle Bridge; 53.89711°N 2.75989°W		1797	This is bridge No. 57, an accommodation bridge over the Lancaster Canal. It is in sandstone and consists of a single elliptical arch. The bridge has a stepped keystone below a solid parapet with a rounded top.
Dimples Bridge; 53.89562°N 2.76425°W	—	1797	This is bridge No. 58 over the Lancaster Canal, and carries Dimples Lane over the canal. It is in sandstone and consists of a single elliptical arch. The bridge has a stepped keystone below a solid parapet with a rounded top.
Garstang Turnpike Bridge; 53.89434°N 2.76905°W		1797	This is bridge No. 59 over the Lancaster Canal, and carries Garstang Road (B6430 road) over the canal. It is in sandstone and consists of a single elliptical arch. The bridge has a stepped keystone below a solid parapet with a rounded top.
Byerworth Bridge; 53.89400°N 2.77211°W		1797	This is bridge No. 60 over the Lancaster Canal, and carries Byerworth Lane North over the canal. It is in sandstone and consists of a single elliptical arch. The bridge has a stepped keystone below a solid parapet with a rounded top.
Wyre Aqueduct; 53.89687°N 2.77698°W		1797	The aqueduct carries the Lancaster Canal over the River Wyre. It is in sandstone and consists of a single elliptical arch with voussoirs and with curving abutments. The aqueduct has a solid parapet beneath which is an entablature with a dentilled cornice, and under this is a blank panel with a moulded border.
Sandholme Bridge; 53.88554°N 2.73337°W	—	1811	The bridge carries Sandholme Lane over the River Calder. It is in sandstone and consists of a single segmental arch. The bridge has a band and a solid parapet with coping. In the western parapet is an inscribed sunken plaque.
Calder Bridge; 53.88357°N 2.76349°W	—	1812	The bridge carries Garstang Road (B6430) over the River Calder. It is in sandstone and consists of a single elliptical arch with voussoirs. The bridge has a solid parapet with coping. A pier on the east side is inscribed with the date.
Pump, Greenhalgh Castle Farm; 53.90004°N 2.76042°W	—	1825	The pump consists of a lead tank with a spout, two wooden supports, and a cast iron handle. On the tank are initials and the date.
Garstang Bridge; 53.89823°N 2.77288°W		Early 19th century	The bridge, which was widened in the 20th century, carries Bridge Street (B6430 road) over the River Wyre. It is in sandstone and consists of two segmental arches. There are central triangular cutwaters, above which are pedestrian refuges, and the bridge has solid parapets.
Gubberford Bridge; 53.91990°N 2.77032°W	—	Early 19th century	The bridge carries Gubberford Lane over the River Wyre. It is in sandstone and consists of two segmental arches with triangular cutwaters. The bridge has a solid parapet with shaped coping.
Calder Bridge Friends' Meeting House; 53.88753°N 2.76420°W	—	1828	The Quaker meeting house is in sandstone with a slate roof. It is in a single storey and has three bays. The building has a gabled porch with rounded corners, and the doorway has a plain surround. The windows are sashes.
Calder Vale Bridge; 53.90669°N 2.71227°W	—	1830s (probable)	The bridge carries a road over the River Calder. It is in sandstone and consists of a single segmental arch with a band below the parapet.
1 and 2 Mount Pleasant; 53.90679°N 2.71130°W	—	Early to mid 19th century	A pair of sandstone houses with a slate roof in two storeys. No. 1 has one bay, and No. 2 has two. The round-headed doorways have plain surrounds, keystones, imposts, and fanlights, and the windows are sashes.
The Forge; 53.90706°N 2.75530°W	—	Mid 19th century	Originally a sawmill, later used for other purposes, it is in sandstone with a slate roof. Built on a slope, it has one storey on the east front and two at the rear. The east front has three bays, and contains a doorway and three windows with plain reveals and modern glazing. To the right, with a roof at a lower level, is a wheel house containing a breast wheel 21 feet (6.4 m) high with an iron hub and rim.
Church of St Mary and St Michael; 53.89741°N 2.77097°W		1857–58	A Roman Catholic church designed by E. G. Paley, it is in sandstone with slate roofs. The church consists of a west tower, a nave and a chancel in a single unit, a north aisle, a Lady chapel at the northeast, and a north porch. The tower has diagonal buttresses, an octagonal stair turret with stone spirelet, and an embattled parapet. The west window of the nave and the east window of the chancel contain Geometric tracery.
Church of St John the Evangelist; 53.91125°N 2.70534°W		1863	The church is in sandstone with a slate roof. It consists of a west tower, a nave with a north aisle and a south porch, and a chancel with a roof at a lower level. The tower has diagonal buttresses, an embattled parapet, and a pyramidal roof. Most of the windows contain Perpendicular tracery.
All Saints Church; 53.90790°N 2.74320°W		1906–96	The church, designed by Austin and Paley, is in sandstone with a red tile roof. It consists of a west tower, a nave and chancel in one unit, a north transept with a vestry, and a south chapel that was added in 1936–37. The tower has diagonal buttresses, a northeast stair turret, a parapet, and a pyramidal roof. The east and west windows contain Perpendicular tracery.
