= Richard Jackson (minister) =

English Quaker minister (1783 – 1846)

- Born: 1783
- Died: December 1846 (aged 64); Calder Vale, Lancashire, England
- Occupation: Quaker minister

Richard Jackson (1783 – December 1846) was an English Quaker minister who, with his brother Jonathan, founded the English village of Calder Vale, Lancashire.

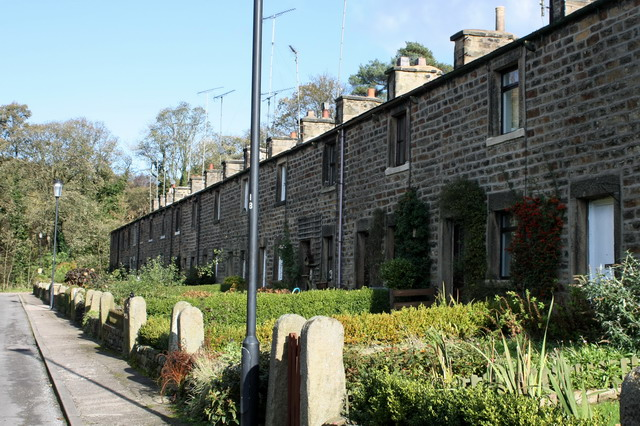
Calder Vale's Long Row, which the Jackson brothers built in the 1830s

With another brother, John, they had moved to Calder Vale from their family's home, Spout House in Nether Wyresdale.

He married, firstly, Elizabeth Labrey, of Rooten Brook Farm in Quernmore. He married a second time, to Mary Wilcockson.

In 1830, he donated to the Society of Friends a piece of land in Bowgreave, near Garstang, to be used as a burial ground. He had built a meeting house on the land in May 1828. Located on Calder House Lane, it became known as the Calder Bridge Meeting House. It was licensed as a place of worship on 21 October 1829. The meeting house became a Grade II listed building in 1986. The Calder Bridge Burial Book was begun in April 1830, and was maintained for over a century.

In 1835, the brothers built today's Lappet Mill, on the banks of the River Calder in Calder Vale. They also built the terraced mill workers' houses near the mill.

He was made a minister in July 1836.

Jackson died in December 1846, age 64. He was the first interment in the burial ground of the Calder Bridge Meeting House. The burial ground is marked only by "simple gravestones bearing minimal inscriptions". It ran along two sides of the meeting house and is believed to be still in use.
