= Listed buildings in Claughton, Wyre =

Claughton (/ˈklaɪtən/; also known as Claughton-on-Brock) is a civil parish in the Wyre district of Lancashire, England. It contains 35 buildings that are recorded in the National Heritage List for England as designated listed buildings. Of these, one is at Grade II*, the middle grade, and the others are at Grade II, the lowest grade. The parish is a scattered rural area, and most of the listed buildings are farmhouses, farm buildings, houses and cottages, and associated structures. The Lancaster Canal and the River Brock pass through the parish; four bridges crossing the canal and two crossing the river are listed. The other listed buildings are medieval crosses, a church, a milestone, and a public house.

== Key ==
Grade	Criteria
II*	Particularly important buildings of more than special interest
II	Buildings of national importance and special interest

== Buildings ==
Name and location	Photograph	Date	Notes	Grade
Cross; 53.88167°N 2.72396°W	—	Medieval	The cross is in sandstone, with a base consisting of an irregular boulder with a rectangular socket. The shaft was added in 1920, it is tapering, and carries a cross head with interlace ornament. On the base is an inscribed brass plate.	II
Cross base 53.87317°N 2.75847°W	—	Medieval	The cross base is in sandstone and consists of an irregular boulder with a rectangular socket.	II
Cross base 53.87538°N 2.76602°W	—	Medieval	The base of a former wayside cross is in sandstone and consists of a boulder about 0.7 metres (2 ft 4 in) square, with a shallow socket about 0.3 metres (1 ft 0 in) square and about 0.05 metres (2.0 in) deep.	II
Claughton Smithy; 53.88076°N 2.73511°W	—	17th century	The house and the adjoining smithy, which dates from the 19th century, are in stone with slate roofs. The house has two storeys and two bays, and contains mullioned windows. The single-storey smithy to the left has a wide doorway with a quoined surround, and windows with plain reveals. Inside the house is a bressumer.	II
Little Banister Hey and stable 53.87678°N 2.70129°W	—	17th century	A house in rendered stone with artificial slate roofs, it has one storey with an attic. The windows are modern with rendered surrounds, and in the attic are three dormers. Inside the house are two cruck trusses and a bressumer.	II
Longfield House and stable 53.88899°N 2.69897°W	—	1667	The house and adjoining stable are in sandstone with slate roofs. The house has two storeys, and it originally had three bays, with another bay later added to the right. The windows were originally mullioned, but some mullions have been removed; there is one horizontal sliding sash window. The doorway has a chamfered surround and an inscribed battlemented lintel. The stable is set back at the left and contains doors, windows and a pitching hole.	II
1 and 2 Duckworth Hall; 53.87426°N 2.71586°W	—	Late 17th century	Originally one house, later divided into two dwellings, the lower floor is in sandstone and the upper parts are in brick. There are two storeys and three bays. The windows in the upper floor are mullioned, and in the ground floor are modern windows. There is a gabled stone porch with carved bargeboards. Inside the building are bressumers.	II
Claughton House; 53.86859°N 2.73039°W	—	Late 17th century	The house was altered in the late 19th century. It is in rendered brick with stone quoins and a slate roof. There are two storeys with an attic. The house has an H-shaped plan, with a central range of three bays, and cross wings, each of two bays. There is one mullioned and transomed window, the other windows being cross windows apart from a blocked mullioned attic window. The doorway has a chamfered surround and an inscribed Tudor arched head.	II
Duckett's Farmhouse; 53.86845°N 2.73933°W	—	Late 17th century (probable)	The farmhouse is in sandstone with a slate roof, and contains earlier timber-framing. There are two storeys, and a main range of two bays with a one-bay cross wing at the right. The windows are mullioned, some containing sashes. The doorway has a chamfered surround.	II
Duckworth Farmhouse; 53.87432°N 2.71397°W	—	Late 17th century	The farmhouse is in rendered stone with a thatched roof. It has one storey with an attic, and three bays. The windows are mullioned and the doorway has rendered reveals. There is one attic window and a dormer.	II
High House and barn 53.88095°N 2.70725°W	—	Late 17th century (probable)	The farmhouse and barn are in stone, and the house has a slate roof, two storeys and two bays. The windows of the house are mullioned and there are also two stair windows. The doorway has plain reveals, a hood mould, and a lintel with an inscription no longer legible. The barn to the right has an asbestos sheet roof, and contains a wide entrance with a canopy, a window, and a doorway. Inside the house is a bressumer.	II
1 and 2 The Street; 53.87889°N 2.74209°W	—	1689	Originally one house, later divided into two, it is in sandstone with a slate roof. The house has three storeys and three bays, and the windows are mullioned. The central doorway has a moulded surround and a shaped inscribed lintel. There are extensions on both sides of the house, one, a former shippon, contains a re-set battlemented lintel with a carved badger. Inside the house is a bressumer.	II*
Manor House Farmhouse and stable 53.87191°N 2.71175°W	—	1692	The farmhouse and adjoining stable are in stone with slate roofs. The house has two storeys and three bays. The windows are mullioned, and some contain sashes. The doorway has a chamfered surround and a battlemented inscribed lintel. The stable to the right has a window with a plain surround. In the east gable wall is a doorway with a re-set inscribed lintel.	II
Matshead Farmhouse; 53.86231°N 2.73418°W	—	1703	The farmhouse is in rendered brick with a slate roof, in two storeys with an attic. It has an L-shaped plan with a main range of three bays and a one-bay rear wing. In the main range are cross windows, and there is a mullioned window in the attic. The doorway has a moulded surround, a shaped inscribed lintel and a slated canopy. In the rear wing is a mullioned and transomed window and a cross window. Inside the house is a bressumer.	II
Clarkson's Farmhouse and barn 53.87442°N 2.71005°W	—	Early 18th century	The house and attached barn are in stone. The house has two storeys and two bays. The windows are modern, and both the windows and the doorway have plain reveals. The barn contains a wide entrance and a doorway. (Note: Street View in March 2009 shows that the barn has been converted for domestic use.)	II
Crabtree Nook; 53.88215°N 2.72646°W	—	Early 18th century	A sandstone house with a slate roof, in two storeys and two bays, with a rear outshut. Most windows are mullioned, but some mullions have been removed. There are two doorways, one with a quoined surround, and the other has a modern porch.	II
Street House; 53.87945°N 2.74229°W	—	Early to mid 18th century	The house is in rendered brick on a stone base, and has two storeys with an attic, and a front of three bays. The windows are mullioned and contain sashes. The doorway has a rendered surround and a cast iron porch. Between windows in the upper floor is a blank shield. The gables have bargeboards.	II
Cross House Farmhouse; 53.88065°N 2.72396°W	—	Mid 18th century (probable)	A sandstone farmhouse with a slate roof, it has two storeys. It originally had two bays, and another bay was added later to the left. The windows are mullioned and contain sashes; those in the upper floor also have hood moulds. The doorway has a plain surround and a timber pitched hood.	II
Gate piers and walls, Myerscough House; 53.86565°N 2.74860°W	—	18th century	The gate piers are square in plan and in rusticated sandstone. The outer pair have moulded cornices and ball finials, and Doric pilasters. Curved stone walls link these to an inner pair of smaller piers.	II
Milestone; 53.86602°N 2.74893°W	—	Late 18th century	The milestone is in sandstone and has a half-oval plan and a rounded top. It is inscribed with "CLAUGHTON" round its base. Above are cast iron panels with moulded borders inscribed with the distances in miles to Garstang and to Preston.	II
Shepherd's Hill; 53.87635°N 2.70561°W	—	1792	A sandstone house with a slate roof in two storeys and two bays. The windows are sashes, and the doorway has imposts; both the windows and the doorway have stone surrounds with false keystones.	II
Church of St Thomas; 53.87560°N 2.72041°W		1792–94	A Roman Catholic church, the façade dating from 1835. It is rendered with sandstone dressings and slate roofs. On the front is a central single-storey porch with a moulded pediment and a round-headed outer doorway with a keystone and an impost band. The inner doorway has an architrave and a Latin inscription below a pediment. Above the porch are three lunette windows, and at the top is a cornice and a central cross. Along the sides of the church are round-headed windows containing Venetian-style tracery. Inside the church is a west gallery.	II
Ibbetson's Bridge; 53.86634°N 2.74836°W	—	1797	This is bridge No. 48 over the Lancaster Canal. It is an accommodation bridge in sandstone and consists of a single elliptical arch. The bridge has stepped keystones below solid parapets with rounded tops.	II
Claughton Lane Bridge; 53.86840°N 2.74979°W		1797	This is bridge No. 49 over the Lancaster Canal, and it carries New Lane over the canal. The bridge is in sandstone and consists of a single elliptical arch with stepped keystones below solid parapets with rounded tops.	II
Town Croft Bridge; 53.87257°N 2.74761°W	—	1797	This is bridge No. 50 over the Lancaster Canal. It is an accommodation bridge in sandstone and consists of a single elliptical arch. The bridge has stepped keystones below solid parapets with rounded tops.	II
Stubbins Bridge; 53.88023°N 2.74779°W	—	1797	This is bridge No. 51 over the Lancaster Canal, and it carries Stubbins Lane over the canal. The bridge is in sandstone and consists of a single elliptical arch with stepped keystones below solid parapets with rounded tops.	II
Westfield Farmhouse; 53.87258°N 2.76544°W	—	c. 1800	The farmhouse contains some earlier material. It is rendered with a slate roof, and has two storeys and three bays. The windows are sashes, and the doorway has plain reveals. In the rear wall is an inscribed plaque. Inside the house is a bressumer.	II
Stable block, Claughton Hall; 53.87351°N 2.74207°W	—	Early 19th century	The stable block, partly converted into living accommodation, is in sandstone with a tile roof. The range is symmetrical, with a central two-storey block, flanked by single-storey links to pavilions. The central block contains a tall round-arched entrance, above which is a lunette and a moulded pediment. The right link and pavilion also contain lunettes, and the left pavilion has modern windows. At the rear is a lean-to canopy carried on Tuscan columns.	II
New Bridge; 53.86292°N 2.72722°W		Early 19th century	The bridge carries Lydiate Lane over the River Brock. It is in sandstone and consists of a single elliptical arch. The bridge has voussoirs and a band below a solid parapet.	II
Old Lodge (North); 53.87292°N 2.73723°W	—	Early 19th century	The lodge to Claughton Hall is in sandstone with chamfered quoins and a hipped slate roof. The windows are sashes with plain surrounds, and the doorway also has a plain surround.	II
Old Lodge (South); 53.87279°N 2.73708°W	—	Early 19th century	The lodge to Claughton Hall is in sandstone with chamfered quoins and a hipped slate roof. It has two storeys and two bays with chamfered quoins. The windows are sashes with plain surrounds, and the doorway also has a plain surround. Attached to the north wall is a gate pier.	II
Walmsley Bridge; 53.86761°N 2.71024°W		Early 19th century (probable)	The bridge carries Walmsley Bridge Lane over the River Brock. It is in sandstone and consists of a single elliptical arch. The bridge has voussoirs with alternate rustication, a band, and a solid parapet with coping. The western parapet has two dated inscriptions.	II
West Lodge; 53.87351°N 2.74207°W	—	Early 19th century	The lodge to Claughton Hall is in sandstone with a tile roof, and has a single storey. At the north end the gable projects to form a pediment over a porch. The porch has four Tuscan columns with pilasters, and the doorway has an architrave. In the pediment is a carved coat of arms. On the side of the lodge are three round-arched recesses with keystones. The outer recesses contain sash windows, and in the middle recess is a niche.	II
Mount Pleasant Farmhouse; 53.87671°N 2.70221°W	—	1826	A stone house with quoins and a slate roof, in two storeys and two bays. The doorway and windows have plain surrounds, and the windows are sashes. Above the doorway is an inscribed plaque.	II
Brockholes Arms; 53.87605°N 2.75973°W		Early to mid 19th century	The public house is in sandstone with a hipped slate roof, in two storeys. There is a symmetrical front with a central porch flanked by one bay on each side. Also on the front is a plinth and clasping pilasters. The porch has four Ionic columns, and a cornice, above which is an inscribed plaque. Over the porch is a carved coat of arms. The windows are sashes.	II

== Notes and references ==
=== Sources ===
- Hartwell, Clare; Pevsner, Nikolaus (2009) [1969], Lancashire: North, The Buildings of England, New Haven and London: Yale University Press, ISBN 978-0-300-12667-9
- Historic England, "Cross, Claughton (1163388)", National Heritage List for England
- Historic England, "Cross base, Claughton (1072890)", National Heritage List for England
- Historic England, "Medieval cross base, Claughton (1442825)", National Heritage List for England
- Historic England, "Claughton Smithy, Claughton (1072893)", National Heritage List for England
- Historic England, "Little Banister Hey and former stable adjoining, Claughton (1361904)", National Heritage List for England
- Historic England, "Longfield House and stable adjoining to north-west, Claughton (1163442)", National Heritage List for England
- Historic England, "Nos. 1 and 2 Duckworth Hall, Claughton (1163427)", National Heritage List for England
- Historic England, "Claughton House (1318252)", National Heritage List for England
- Historic England, "Duckett's Farmhouse, Claughton (1163414)", National Heritage List for England
- Historic England, "Duckworth Farmhouse, Claughton (1361903)", National Heritage List for England
- Historic England, "High House and barn adjoining to north-east, Claughton (1072924)", National Heritage List for England
- Historic England, "Nos. 1 and 2 The Street, Claughton (1361927)", National Heritage List for England
- Historic England, "Manor House Farmhouse and stable adjoining to east, Claughton (1072925)", National Heritage List for England
- Historic England, "Matshead Farmhouse, Claughton (1163446)", National Heritage List for England
- Historic England, "Clarkson's Farmhouse and barn adjoining to east, Claughton (1072922)", National Heritage List for England
- Historic England, "Crabtree Nook, Claughton (1361941)", National Heritage List for England
- Historic England, "Street House, Claughton (1072891)", National Heritage List for England
- Historic England, "Cross House Farmhouse, Claughton (1072923)", National Heritage List for England
- Historic England, "Two pairs of piers with linking walls at entrance to drive to Myerscough House, Claughton (1072889)", National Heritage List for England
- Historic England, "Milestone, Claughton (1163484)", National Heritage List for England
- Historic England, "Shepherd's Hill, Claughton (1163464)", National Heritage List for England
- Historic England, "Church of St.Thomas, Claughton (1163352)", National Heritage List for England
- Historic England, "Ibbetson's Bridge (No.48), Claughton (1163437)", National Heritage List for England
- Historic England, "Claughton Lane Bridge (No.49), Claughton (1361928)", National Heritage List for England
- Historic England, "Town Croft Bridge (No.50), Claughton (1163468)", National Heritage List for England
- Historic England, "Stubbins Bridge (No.51), Claughton (1361929)", National Heritage List for England
- Historic England, "Westfield Farmhouse, Claughton (1361906)", National Heritage List for England
- Historic England, "Stable block north of Claughton Hall (1072927)", National Heritage List for England
- Historic England, "New Bridge, Claughton (1072911)", National Heritage List for England
- Historic England, "Old Lodge (North) to Claughton Hall (1163457)", National Heritage List for England
- Historic England, "Old Lodge (South) to Claughton Hall (1361905)", National Heritage List for England
- Historic England, "Walmsley Bridge, Claughton (1361938)", National Heritage List for England
- Historic England, "West Lodge, Claughton (1072892)", National Heritage List for England
- Historic England, "Mount Pleasant Farmhouse, Claughton (1072926)", National Heritage List for England
- Historic England, "Brockholes Arms, Claughton (1361926)", National Heritage List for England
- Historic England, Listed Buildings
