= Listed buildings in Catterall =

Catterall is a civil parish in the Wyre district of Lancashire, England. It contains eight listed buildings that are recorded in the National Heritage List for England. All the listed buildings are designated at Grade II, the lowest of the three grades, which is applied to "buildings of national importance and special interest". The parish includes the village of Catterall and the surrounding countryside. The Lancaster Canal and the River Calder run through the parish, and the listed buildings associated with these are bridges and an aqueduct. The other listed buildings are two medieval cross bases, a farmhouse with an associated barn, and a milestone.

== Buildings ==
Name and location	Photograph	Date	Notes
Cross base 53.87867°N 2.76555°W	—	Medieval	The cross base is in sandstone and consists of an irregular boulder with a socket.
Cross; 53.87783°N 2.77351°W	—	Medieval (probable)	The base of the cross is probably medieval and it consists of an irregular boulder. Cemented into a socket is a rectangular shaft, which is probably a modern restoration.
Catterall Hall Farmhouse; 53.87680°N 2.79282°W	—	Mid 18th century	The farmhouse is in rendered brick with sandstone dressings, quoins, and a slate roof. It has two storeys with an attic, and six bays. The windows are sashes.
Milestone; 53.87790°N 2.76164°W	—	Late 18th century	The milestone is in sandstone and has a half-oval plan and a rounded top. It is inscribed with "CATTERALL" round its base. Above are cast iron panels with moulded borders inscribed with the distances in miles to Garstang and to Preston.
Bridge No. 52, Calder Aqueduct and Weir; 53.88429°N 2.75172°W	—	1797	This consists of an aqueduct carrying the Lancaster Canal over the River Calder, together with a weir on the river. They are built in sandstone and the river passes under the canal through a single elliptical arch.
Bridge No. 53; 53.88488°N 2.75207°W		1797	This is an accommodation bridge over the Lancaster Canal. It is in sandstone and consists of a single elliptical arch. The bridge has a stepped keystone below a solid parapet with a rounded top.
Calder Bridge; 53.88357°N 2.76349°W	—	1812	The bridge carries Garstang Road (B6430) over the River Calder. It is in sandstone and consists of a single elliptical arch with voussoirs. The bridge has a solid parapet with coping. A pier on the east side is inscribed with the date.
Barn, Catterall Hall Farm; 53.87646°N 2.79291°W	—	1839	The barn is in sandstone with brick internal walls and a slate roof. It contains a wide entrance with a keystone in the arch and the date inscribed above it, ventilation slits, and windows.
