= Oakenclough =

Hamlet in Lancashire, England

Coordinates: 53.920°N 2.703°W

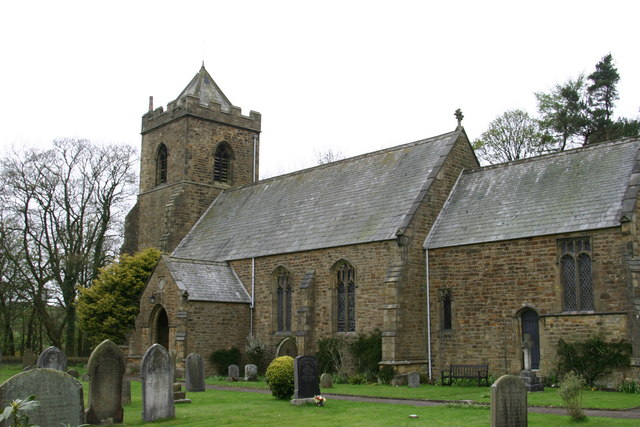
- The church of St. John the Evangelist

- Location in Wyre Borough Location in the Forest of Bowland Location within Lancashire
- OS grid reference: SD538474
- Civil parish: Bleasdale; Barnacre-with-Bonds
- District: Wyre
- Shire county: Lancashire
- Region: North West
- Country: England
- Sovereign state: United Kingdom
- Post town: PRESTON
- Postcode district: PR3
- Dialling code: 01995
- Police: Lancashire
- Fire: Lancashire
- Ambulance: North West
- UK Parliament: Lancaster and Wyre

Oakenclough (/ˈoʊkənkluː/) is an English hamlet located on the edge of the Forest of Bowland in Lancashire.

Oakenclough is a small and scattered community, which appears to have developed largely as a result of a paper mill being sited here to make use of the water power available from the swiftly flowing River Calder. In 1827, Quaker John Jackson bought the mill from Richard Curtis, a paper manufacturer and farmer who had gone bankrupt. Jackson built and lived in the adjacent house, known as Calder Bank, where his descendants continued to live for well over a hundred years. Jackson's brothers, Jonathan and Richard, founded nearby Calder Vale in 1835, when they built a mill on the river. It was used to weave cotton and is still in use today, even though the river no longer provides the power.

Built by public subscription, St. John's Church, and the small church school next to it, stands at the top of Church Wood between Calder Vale and Oakenclough.

== Gallery ==
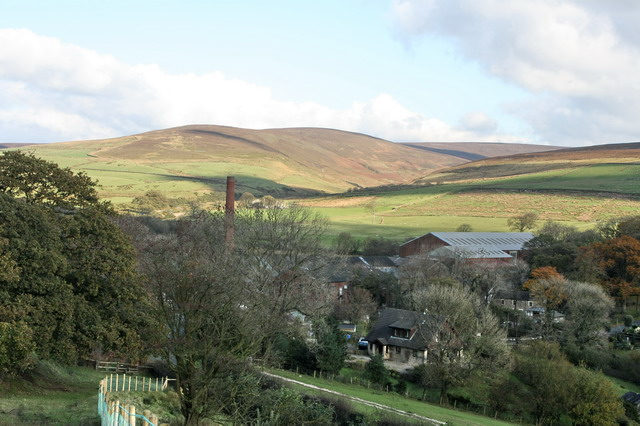
Oakenclough Works. In view is the paper mill, a shed manufacturer, and a scrapyard
