= Lappet Mill =

Textile mill in Lancashire, England

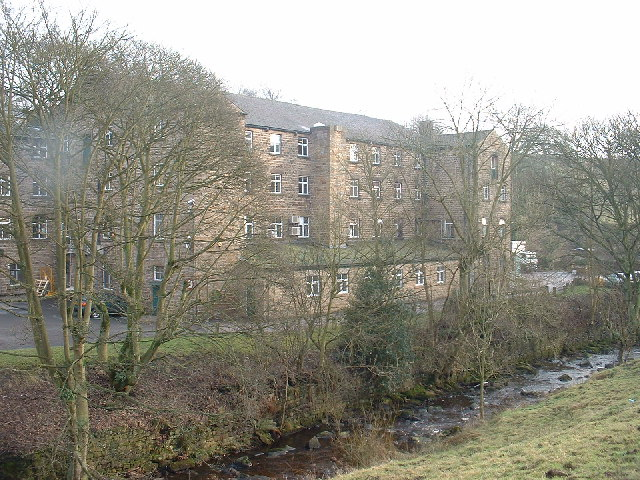
- Pictured in 2006, looking southeast
- Coordinates: 53°54′22″N 2°42′42″W

Construction
- Built: 1835 (191 years ago)
- Floor count: 4

Equipment
- Mule Frames

Lappet Mill is a cotton-weaving mill in the village of Calder Vale, Lancashire, England. The mill, founded by Quakers Jonathan and Richard Jackson in 1835, is the home of Lappet Manufacturing Company, as of 2026.

The mill is powered by the River Calder. A mill pond is located a few yards to the mill's northeast.

One of the mill's main products is the red, black and white checked cloth used for Arab headscarves and it was said that Yasser Arafat's headdresses were made at the mill.

The Jackson brothers built many of the terraced houses still in occupation close to the mills.
