= Listed buildings in Garstang =

Garstang is a civil parish in the Wyre district of Lancashire, England. It contains 17 listed buildings that are recorded in the National Heritage List for England. All the listed buildings are designated at Grade II, the lowest of the three grades, which is applied to "buildings of national importance and special interest". The parish includes the market town of Garstang, and all the listed buildings are in the town. These include a medieval cross base, a former slaughterhouse, houses and shops, a church with associated structures, the former town hall, a former grammar school, public houses, a milestone, and a boundary stone. The Lancaster Canal passes through the parish, and two bridges crossing it are listed.

== Buildings ==
| Name and location | Photograph | Date | Notes |
|---|---|---|---|
| Cross base 53.89918°N 2.77654°W | 46-47 High Street, Garstang | Medieval | The cross base stands near St Thomas' Church and is in sandstone. The base has a roughly rectangular plan and carries part of a rectangular shaft, the upper section of which is chamfered. |
| Outbuilding behind Market House; 53.90033°N 2.77392°W | — | 17th century (probable) | This was originally a slaughterhouse and has since been used for other purposes. It is cruck-framed with sandstone walls and a corrugated asbestos roof. The building has a wide entrance, doorways and a window. Inside the building are two cruck trusses. |
| 46 and 47 High Street; 53.90159°N 2.77406°W | 46-47 High Street, Garstang | Early 18th century (probable) | A café in rendered stone with a corrugated iron roof. It has one storey with an attic, and two bays. The ground floor windows are mullioned, and above are dormers. |
| 11, 12 and 13 High Street; 53.90129°N 2.77393°W | 46-47 High Street, Garstang | 1744 | Originally three shops, later altered, they are rendered with a slate roof, and have three storeys and four bays. In the ground floor are shop fronts, and above are mullioned windows. In the middle floor, between the first and second bays, is an inscribed plaque. |
| 43 High Street; 53.90177°N 2.77402°W | | 1744 | A stone house with a slate roof in two storeys and two bays. The windows in the ground floor are modern, and those in the upper floor are sashes. The doorway has a quoined surround, and above it is an oval inscribed plaque. |
| 2 Bridge Street; 53.89981°N 2.77444°W | — | Mid 18th century (probable) | A rendered shop, since altered, in two storeys and with two bays. The windows are modern with rendered reveals. The doorway, in the right bay, has plain reveals. |
| Market House; 53.90045°N 2.77415°W | | 1755–64 | Originally the town hall, later used for other purposes, the building is in brick with sandstone dressings and a hipped slate roof. There are two storeys, three bays, and chamfered quoins, a band and a cornice. On the ground floor are three arches with keystones, the outer ones smaller and now glazed. In the upper floor are sash windows, and between the floor is a plaque commemorating the Golden Jubilee of Queen Victoria. On the roof is a timber cupola with a clock. |
| St Thomas' Church; 53.89916°N 2.77631°W | | 1770 | The chancel was added in 1876. The church is in sandstone with slate roofs, and consists of a west tower, a nave, a north transept, a chancel with a roof at lower level, and extensions to both sides of the tower that were added in 2004. The tower has quoins, a west doorway and bell openings that are round-headed, and on the summit are corner obelisks. Along the sides of the nave are round-headed windows, and the east window has triple round-headed lancets. Inside the church is a west gallery. |
| 4 Bridge Street; 53.89981°N 2.77444°W | — | Mid to late 18th century (possible) | A rendered shop in two storeys and two bays. The windows, including a bow window in the ground floor, are modern. The doorway has rendered reveals. |
| 44 and 45 High Street and mounting block 53.90168°N 2.77404°W | — | Late 18th century (possible) | A shop and a house that are pebbledashed with a slate roof, and in two storeys. No. 45, on the left, is a shop with a shop front in the ground floor and a doorway to the right. In the upper floor are sash windows. On the front of the shop is a mounting block in sandstone. It has three steps and the front is inscribed. The house (No. 44) also has sash windows, and a door with plain reveals. |
| Arts Centre; 53.90291°N 2.77379°W | | Late 18th century | Originally the grammar school, later used as an arts centre, it is in sandstone with a slate roof. There are two storeys and two bays. and the building has projecting quoins. In the centre is a single-storey gabled porch that has a round-headed doorway with a keystone. The windows are also round-headed and have stone surrounds with keystones and impost blocks. |
| Wheatsheaf Inn; 53.90040°N 2.77603°W | | Late 18th century | A public house, rendered with a slate roof, it has two storeys and two bays. The central doorway has a rendered surround, and the windows are sashes. |
| Bridge No. 62; 53.89878°N 2.77890°W | | 1797 | The bridge carries Kepple Lane over the Lancaster Canal. It is in sandstone and consists of a single elliptical arch with stepped keystones below solid parapets with rounded tops. |
| Bridge No. 63; 53.90023°N 2.78263°W | | 1797 | The bridge carries Moss Lane over the Lancaster Canal. It is in sandstone and consists of a single elliptical arch with stepped keystones below solid parapets with rounded tops. |
| Milestone; 53.91003°N 2.77519°W | — | Early 19th century | The milestone is in sandstone, with a circular base, and triangular above. The base is inscribed with "CABUS". Above are cast iron plates inscribed with the distances in miles to Lancaster Town Hall and to Garstang Town Hall. |
| Royal Oak Hotel; 53.89996°N 2.77454°W | | Early 19th century | The public house is rendered with sandstone dressings and a slate roof. There are two storeys and five bays with a plinth and quoins. The windows are sashes; they and the doorway have rusticated surrounds. |
| Boundary stone 53.90992°N 2.77512°W | — | 19th century | The boundary stone is in sandstone. It formerly marked the boundary between Garstang and Cabus. The stone has a triangular plan with chamfered edges and a flat top, and is inscribed with the names of the parishes. |
