= All Saints Church, Barnacre =

Coordinates: 53.9079°N 2.7431°W

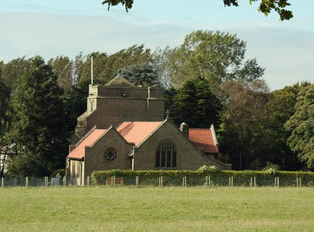
- All Saints Church, Barnacre, from the east

- Location in the Borough of Wyre
- OS grid reference: SD 513,460
- Location: Delph Lane, Barnacre-with-Bonds, Lancashire PR3 1GP
- Country: England
- Denomination: Anglican
- Website: All Saints, Barnacre

History
- Status: Parish church
- Dedicated: 28 July 1905
- Consecrated: 23 October 1911

Architecture
- Functional status: Active
- Heritage designation: Grade II
- Designated: 9 January 1986
- Architect: Austin and Paley
- Architectural type: Church
- Style: Gothic Revival
- Groundbreaking: 1905
- Completed: 1936
- Construction cost: £2,000

Specifications
- Materials: Sandstone, tiled roofs

Administration
- Province: York
- Diocese: Blackburn
- Archdeaconry: Lancaster
- Deanery: Garstang

Clergy
- Vicar: Anton Muller

All Saints Church is in Delph Lane, Barnacre-with-Bonds, Lancashire, England. It is an active Anglican parish church in the deanery of Garstang, the archdeaconry of Lancaster, and the diocese of Blackburn. Its benefice is united with those of St Peter, Scorton, and St John the Evangelist, Calder Vale. The church is recorded in the National Heritage List for England as a designated Grade II listed building.

== History ==
All Saints was built between 1905 and 1906, and designed by the Lancaster architects Austin and Paley. It was dedicated on 28 July 1905 by Edmund Knox, Bishop of Manchester, and was originally a chapel of ease to St Thomas, Garstang. The church cost £2,000 (equivalent to £210,000 in 2025), it was paid for by the family of Thomas Henry Rushton in his memory, and the furnishings were given by the Rushton family. All Saints became a separate parish in its own right in 1911, and the church and churchyard were consecrated on 23 October 1911. In 1936 James Lever Rushton died, and the southeast chapel, designed by Henry Paley, of the same firm of Lancaster architects, was built in his memory at a cost of £1,252.

== Architecture ==
The church is constructed in sandstone rubble, with red tiled roofs. Its plan consists of a nave and a chancel under a continuous roof, a north transept containing the organ chamber and vestry, a south chapel, and a west tower. The tower has angle buttresses, a stair turret at the northeast corner, a plain parapet, and a pyramidal roof. It has a three-light west window with Perpendicular tracery, a north doorway, and two-light bell openings with inscriptions above them. The windows on the sides of the church have two or three lights. In the chapel is a circular east window. The east window in the chancel has four lights with Perpendicular tracery. Inside the church is a two-bay arcade leading to the chapel. In the chancel is a sedilia and a piscina. The font stands under the tower and consists of a large bowl with buttressed sides. The stained glass in the windows was designed by Shrigley and Hunt of Lancaster. The two-manual pipe organ was made in about 1875 by Henry Ainscough and was originally in Barnacre Lodge.

== See also ==
- Listed buildings in Barnacre-with-Bonds
- List of ecclesiastical works by Austin and Paley (1895–1914)
