= Barnacre-with-Bonds =

- Civil parish
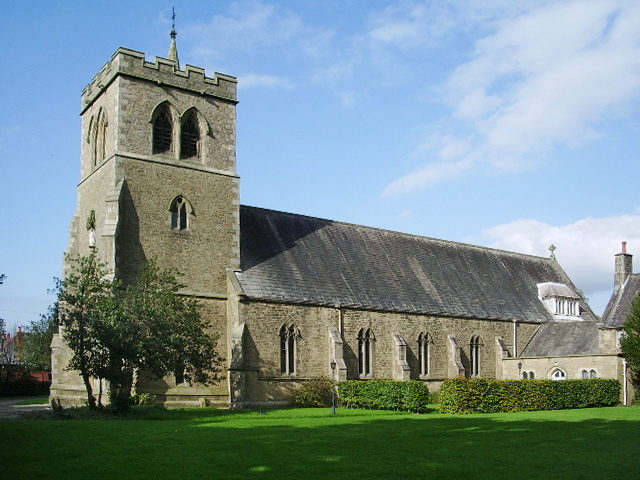
- Bonds church

- Shown within Wyre Borough Shown within Lancashire
- Coordinates: 53°54′31″N 2°43′28″W
- Country: England
- Primary council: Wyre
- County: Lancashire
- Region: North West England
- Status: Parish

Population (2011)
  - Total: 2,148

Barnacre-with-Bonds is a civil parish in the Wyre district of Lancashire, England. According to the 2001 census it had a population of 1,751 increasing to 2,148 at the 2011 census. The parish covers an area to the south and east of Garstang, including the settlements of Bonds, Calder Vale and Bowgreave. It is mostly rural and hilly with a small population.

== Amenities ==
In Bowgreave there is the Garstang Community Academy, formerly known as Garstang High School, and an eighteen-hole golf course, near the Best Western Hotel. The former village pub, the Kenlis Arms Hotel, a former hunting-lodge built in 1856, adjacent to the site of the former Garstang and Catterall railway station, closed in 2022.

Calder Vale, which is one of the most isolated villages in England, has only one road providing access. It lies in a deep valley of the River Calder. The 5-star self-catering Barnacre holiday cottages are located near the village.

The parish includes the Anglican All Saints Church, Barnacre, and St John the Evangelist, Calder Vale; the Catholic Church of St Mary and St Michael, Bonds; and Calder Vale Methodist Chapel. It also includes the ruins of Greenhalgh Castle.

== See also ==
- Listed buildings in Barnacre-with-Bonds
