= Garstang Town Hall =

Municipal building in Garstang, Lancashire, England

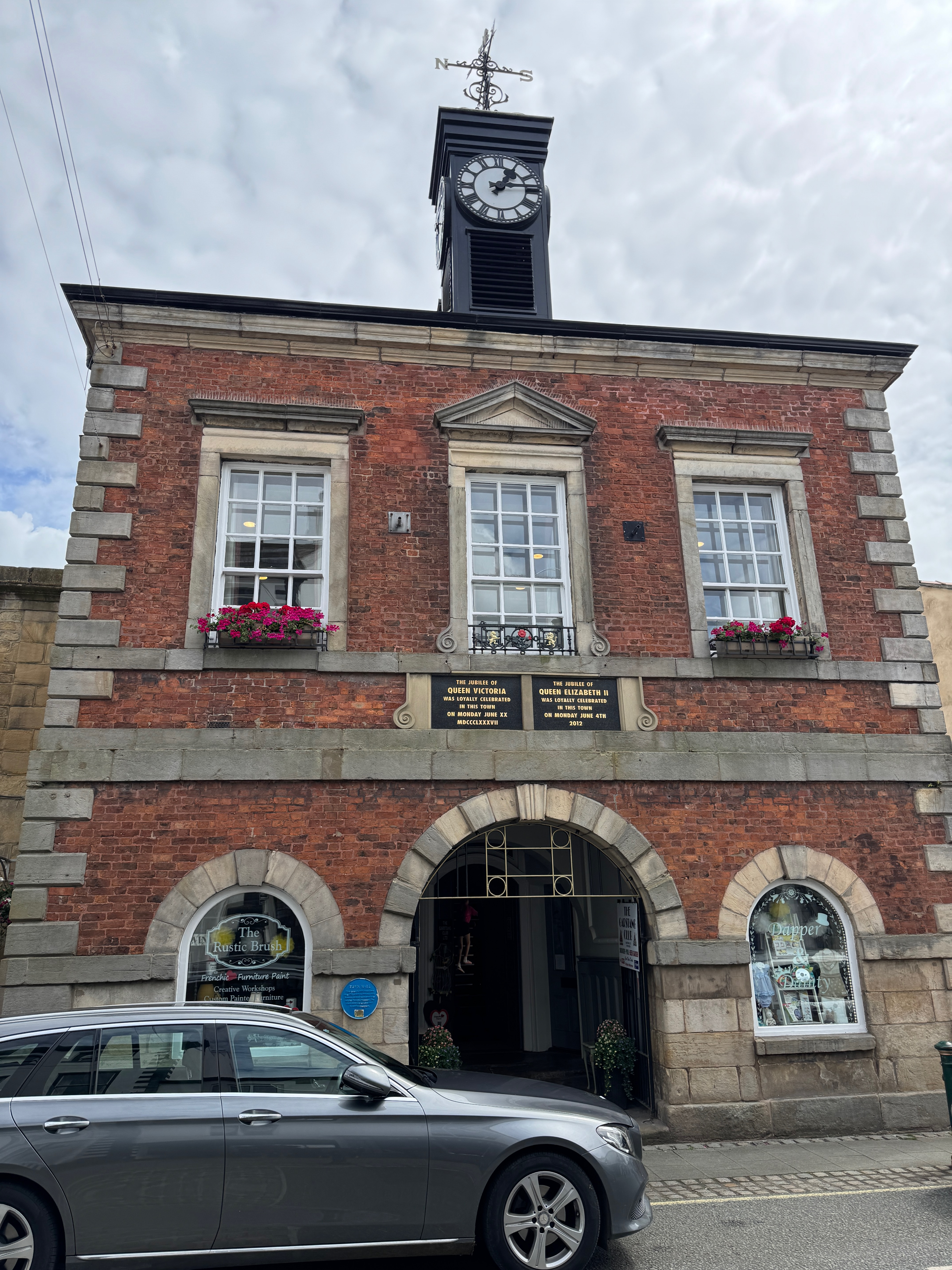
- Pictured in 2024

- Shown in Lancashire Location in the Borough of Wyre
- 53.9004°N 2.7741°W
- Location: High Street, Garstang

History
- Built: 1764

Site notes
- Architectural style: Neoclassical style

Listed Building – Grade II
- Official name: Market House
- Designated: 16 December 1952
- Reference no.: 1072906

Garstang Town Hall is a municipal building in the High Street in Garstang, Lancashire, England. The structure, which currently accommodates two shops and a Royal British Legion Club, is a Grade II listed building.

== History ==
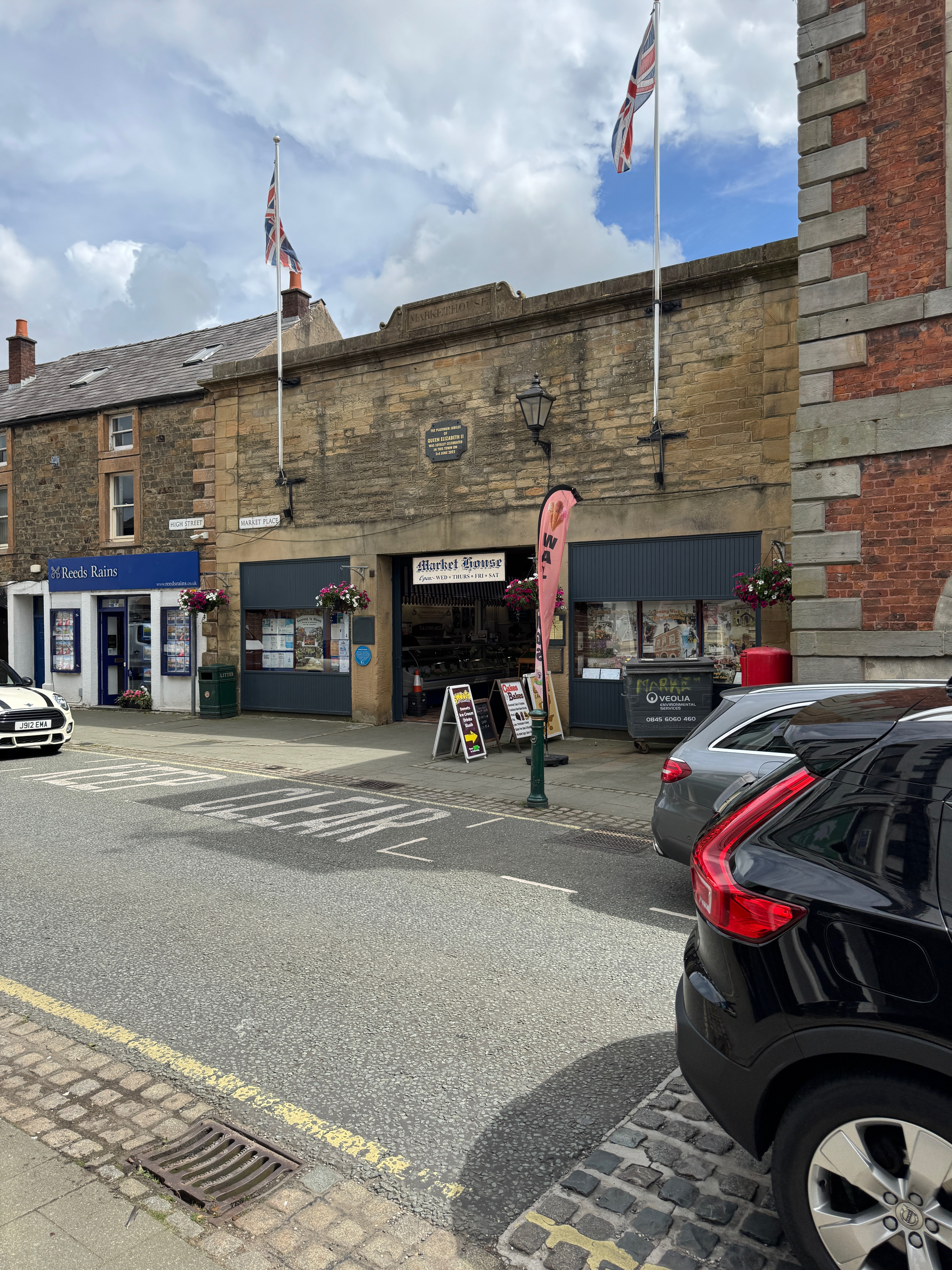
Today's Market House adjoins the town hall to the north

After King Charles II granted the town a charter of incorporation in 1679, the newly elected freemen decided to commission a market hall: the new building was completed in 1680 but was burnt down in a major fire in 1750. The current building, which was erected on the site of the original structure, was designed in the neoclassical style, built in red brick with stone dressings and was built between 1755 and 1764. The design involved a symmetrical main frontage with three bays facing onto the High Street. It was arcaded on the ground floor, so that markets could be held, with an assembly room, for the use of the borough council, on the first floor. There was a wide central opening, with a stone surround and a keystone, flanked by two smaller openings in the same style. On the first floor, there was a central sash window with an architrave, a frieze and a pediment, while the outer bays were fenestrated by sash windows with architraves, friezes and cornices. There was also a main cornice across the top of the main frontage. Internally, although the principal room was the assembly room on the first floor, there was also a lock-up for petty criminals in the basement.

A timber cupola with clock faces and a weather vane was installed in 1847. On account of the relatively small population of the town, the borough council, which had met in the town hall, was abolished under the Municipal Corporations Act 1883. The Charity Commissioners agreed that the town hall and other civic assets be transferred to the newly established Garstang Town Trust in 1886 and a plaque was installed on the front of the building to commemorate the Golden Jubilee of Queen Victoria in 1887.

The area was designated a rural district in 1894, and although the new Garstang Rural District Council initially used the town hall as its meeting place, it moved to larger offices further north along the High Street in 1913. The town hall was subsequently converted for commercial use and, although it was badly damaged in a fire in 1939 and had to be rebuilt, much of the external stonework was saved and restored. The ground floor of the town hall continued to accommodate two shops, while the first floor subsequently became the home of a Royal British Legion Club. An additional plaque was installed on the front of the building to commemorate the Diamond Jubilee of Elizabeth II in 2012.

== See also ==
- Listed buildings in Garstang
