= Market Place, Garstang =

Square in Garstang, England

Market Place
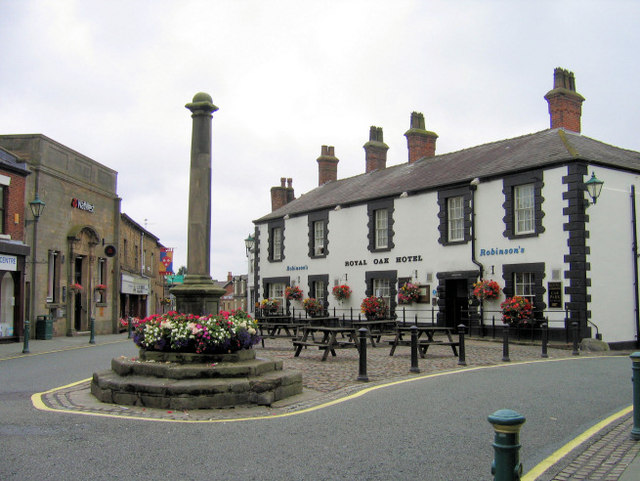
- Market Place and its market cross in 2008, looking south from High Street
- Interactive map of Market Place
- Maintained by: Wyre Borough Council
- Location: Garstang, Lancashire, England
- Coordinates: 53.900071°N 2.774504°W
- West: High Street

Market Place is a public square in the English market town of Garstang, Lancashire. Dating to the Middle Ages, it has historically been a site of weekly markets. It is bounded by High Street to the west and a thoroughfare named Market Place to the east. The two roads split at the town's market cross, located at the northern end of Market Place. It was erected in 1887 to mark Queen Victoria's diamond jubilee.

The Royal Oak Hotel, built in the early 19th century, occupies the southwestern side of Market Place. It is a Grade II listed building.
