= Catterall =

Village and civil parish in Lancashire, England

Coordinates: 53.8798°N 2.7631°W

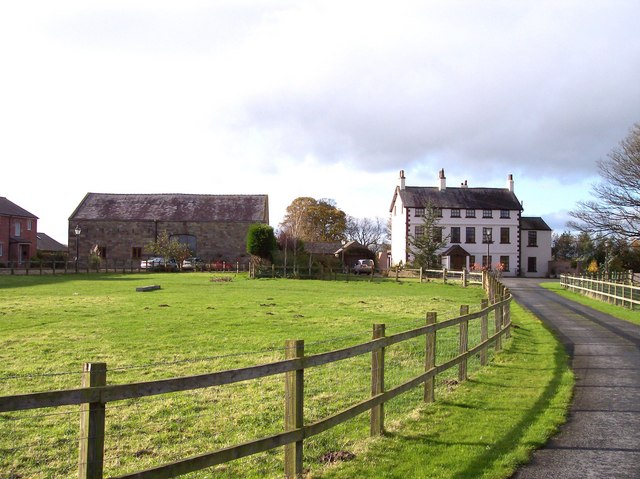
- Catterall Hall

- Shown within Wyre Borough Location within Lancashire
- Population: 2,467 (2021)
- Civil parish: Catterall
- District: Wyre
- Shire county: Lancashire
- Region: North West
- Country: England
- Sovereign state: United Kingdom
- Police: Lancashire
- Fire: Lancashire
- Ambulance: North West
- Website: Catterall Parish Council

Catterall is a village and civil parish in the borough of Wyre, Lancashire, England. Historically in the Amounderness Hundred, it is situated on the A6 between Lancaster and Preston, a short distance from the town of Garstang, and Myerscough College. The rivers Wyre, Calder and Brock run through the parish and in places form the parish boundary.

== Transport ==
As of March 2026 Catterall’s bus services are run by Stagecoach.

They are the following:

- 40/41 to Preston or Lancaster/Morecambe.

- 42 to Blackpool or Lancaster.

The nearest railway station is Preston.

== Toponymy ==
Catterall is mentioned in the Domesday Book of 1086 as Catrehala. Later references include Catrehal, 1272; Katerhalle, 1277; and Caterhale, Caterale, 1292.

The toponymy of the name suggests that the 'hala'or 'halh' part may refer to a topographical feature, indicating that the land mass forming the parish was, in times of antiquity, a 'promontory into the marsh'. This has a certain appeal, as the western edge of the parish does indeed border the flatlands of The Fylde. The same source also suggests that the first section of the name may be associated with a cat. However, this is an educated guess, as no other evidence has been uncovered to support the theory, other than the observation that the old parish boundary had the appearance of a (cat's?) tongue.

== History ==
On 14 February 1716, three local men (Joseph Wadsworth and Thomas Goose of Catterall and Thomas Cartmell of Claughton) were executed for joining the Jacobite rebellion of 1715. They were reputedly executed at Stocks Lane End. In modern times, this is where Cock Robin Lane and Catterall Lane join the A6.

The parish is traversed by several important routes, including the A6, the M6 Motorway, the West Coast Main Line, the B6430 and the Lancaster Canal, all of which run, more-or-less north to south. The parish was served by Garstang and Catterall railway station, which used to stand on the West Coast Main Line, but was closed in the 1960s and later demolished.

In May 2007, Gennaro Panzuto, a member of the Camorra, was arrested in Catterall in connection with gang-related murders.

== Geography ==
The 2021 census showed that 2,467 people lived in the parish of Catterall.

The main employer in Catterall is Franklaw Water Treatment Works on Catterall Lane. The site has developed since the 1960s from a couple of 'Dalek' style boreholes, to a large water treatment works, operated by United Utilities.

The other main employer is Collinson Plc, who manufacture agricultural and industrial buildings.

There is a Post Office within the Village Hall open Tuesdays and Thursdays 11:15-14:15. All main Post Office services are offered.

The adjoining parishes are Claughton, Kirkland, Barnacre-with-Bonds, Upper Rawcliffe-with-Tarnacre and Myerscough and Bilsborrow.

Climate data for Myerscough (14m elevation) 1981–2010
Month	Jan	Feb	Mar	Apr	May	Jun	Jul	Aug	Sep	Oct	Nov	Dec	Year
Mean daily maximum °C (°F)	7.6 (45.7)	8.1 (46.6)	10.3 (50.5)	13.2 (55.8)	16.6 (61.9)	18.9 (66.0)	20.7 (69.3)	20.4 (68.7)	18.0 (64.4)	14.3 (57.7)	10.5 (50.9)	7.9 (46.2)	13.9 (57.0)
Mean daily minimum °C (°F)	1.6 (34.9)	1.5 (34.7)	2.9 (37.2)	4.3 (39.7)	6.9 (44.4)	9.8 (49.6)	12.1 (53.8)	11.8 (53.2)	9.7 (49.5)	7.2 (45.0)	4.0 (39.2)	1.5 (34.7)	6.1 (43.0)
Average rainfall mm (inches)	96.8 (3.81)	69.9 (2.75)	77.0 (3.03)	58.5 (2.30)	61.6 (2.43)	69.4 (2.73)	72.6 (2.86)	94.8 (3.73)	91.9 (3.62)	120.4 (4.74)	108.3 (4.26)	112.7 (4.44)	1,033.6 (40.69)
Average rainy days (≥ 1.0 mm)	15.3	10.9	13.0	10.2	10.6	10.7	11.0	12.9	12.2	15.6	15.9	14.9	153.2
Mean monthly sunshine hours	42.4	70.7	86.0	150.6	194.6	160.3	169.6	152.9	117.3	86.0	44.3	35.2	1,309.9
Source: Met Office

== Governance ==
An electoral ward in the same name exists. This ward stretches slightly beyond the confines of the parish and has a total population at the 2011 Census of 2,594.

== See also ==
- Listed buildings in Catterall

== Bibliography ==
- Gelling, M., (2000), Place-Names in the Landscape, Phoenix Press, ISBN 1-84212-264-9
