= Wheatsheaf Inn =

- The Wheatsheaf
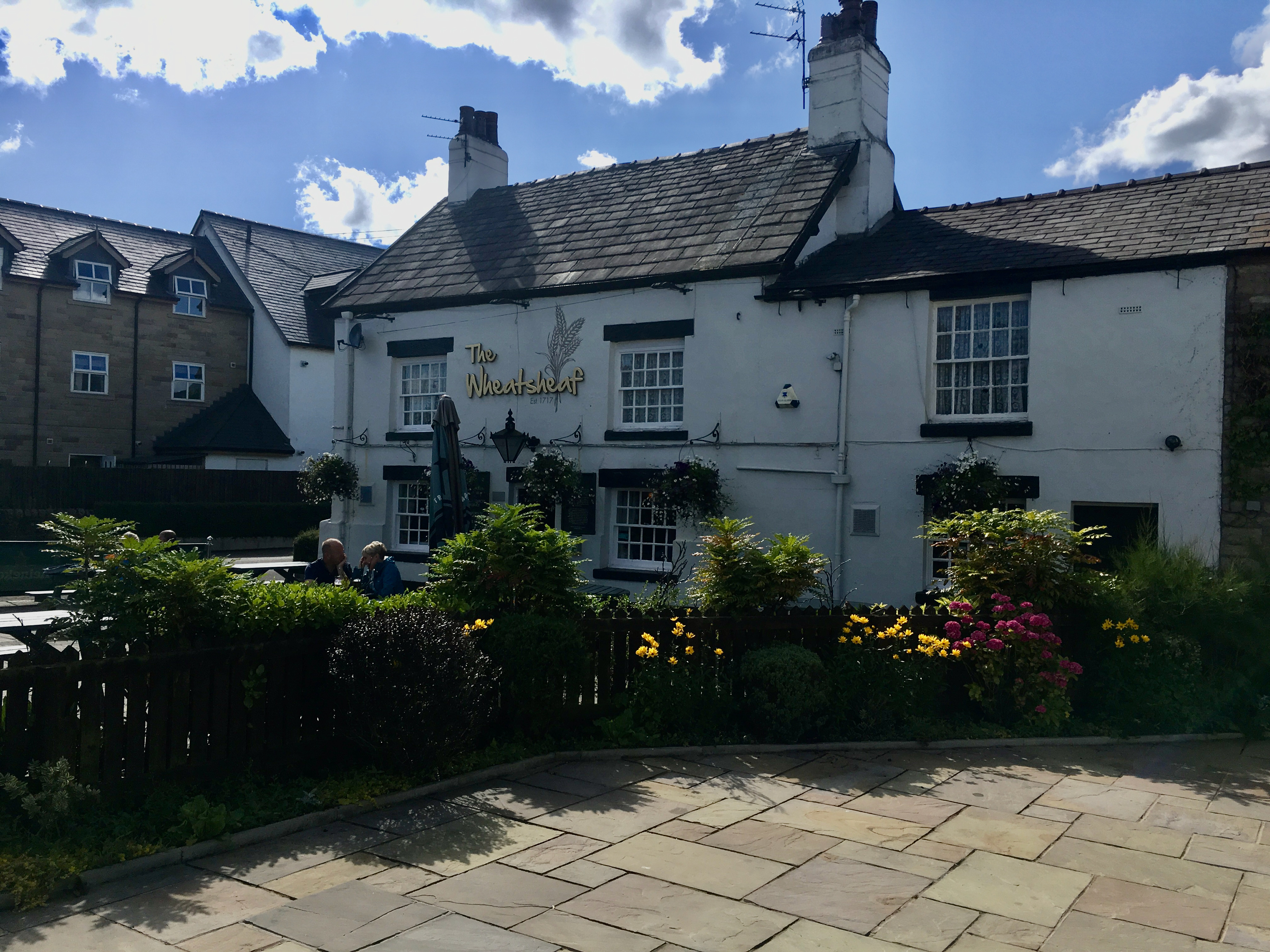
- The building in 2017

- Location within the Borough of Wyre Location within Lancashire
- 53.900447°N 2.776074°W
- Location: Garstang, Lancashire, England

History
- Built: late 18th century

Site notes
- Area: Wyre

Listed Building – Grade II
- Designated: 9 January 1986
- Reference no.: 1318180

The Wheatsheaf Inn (also known as The Wheatsheaf) is a historic building in Garstang, Lancashire, England. Built in the late 18th century, it has been designated a Grade II listed building by Historic England.

Located on Park Hill Road (the B6430), it is rendered with a slate roof. It has two storeys and two bays. The central doorway has a rendered surround, and the windows are sashes.

== See also ==
- Listed buildings in Garstang
