= Royal Oak Hotel, Garstang =

Pub in Lancashire, England

Royal Oak Hotel
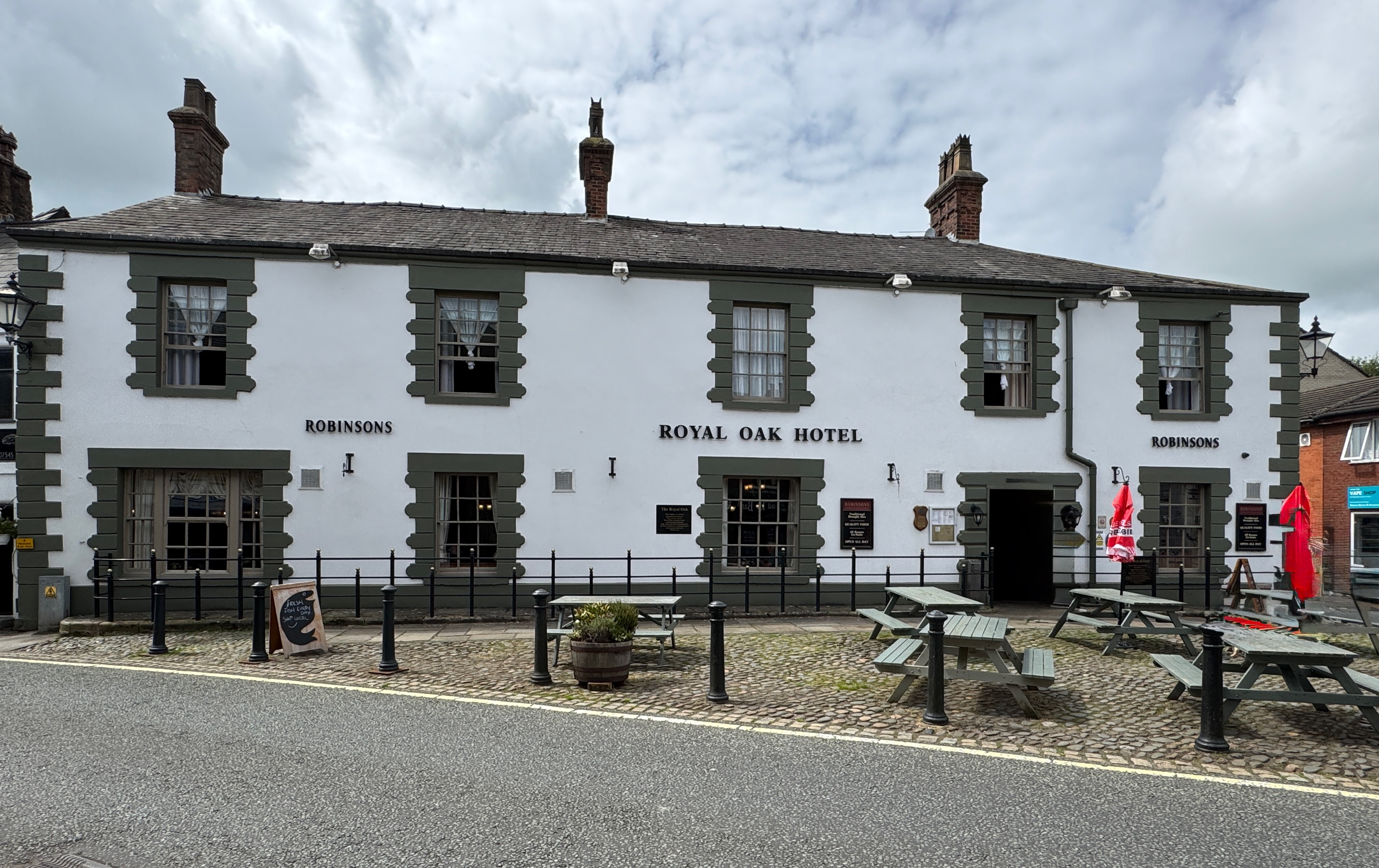
- The building in 2024
- Interactive map of the Royal Oak Hotel area

General information
- Type: Public house
- Location: Market Place, Garstang, Lancashire, England
- Coordinates: 53.899960°N 2.774540°W
- Completed: Early 19th century

Technical details
- Floor count: 2

Website
- www.royaloakgarstang.co.uk

The Royal Oak Hotel is a public house and hotel the Market Place of Garstang, Lancashire, England. A Grade II listed building, the pub is owned by Robinsons Brewery.

The building is rendered with sandstone dressings and a slate roof. There are two storeys and five bays with a plinth and quoins. The windows are sashes; they and the doorway have rusticated surrounds.

== See also ==
- Listed buildings in Garstang

== Sources ==
- Hartwell, Clare; Pevsner, Nikolaus (2009) [1969], Lancashire: North, The Buildings of England, New Haven and London: Yale University Press, ISBN 978-0-300-12667-9
- Historic England, "Royal Oak Hotel, Garstang (1361932)", National Heritage List for England
