= St Thomas' Church, Garstang =

Coordinates: 53.8991°N 2.7762°W

St Thomas', Garstang
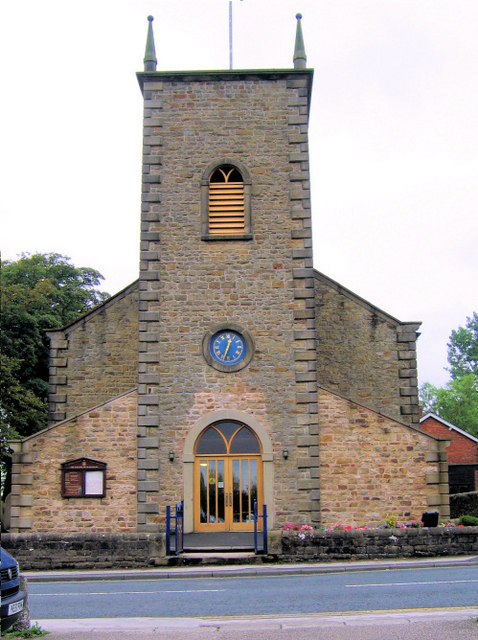

- Location in the Borough of Wyre
- OS grid reference: SD 49093 45049
- Location: Garstang, Lancashire
- Country: England
- Denomination: Church of England

History
- Status: Parish church

Architecture
- Functional status: Active
- Heritage designation: Grade II
- Designated: 17 April 1967
- Architect(s): Richard Gillow; Paley and Austin

Administration
- Province: York
- Diocese: Blackburn
- Archdeaconry: Lancaster
- Deanery: Garstang

St Thomas' Church is a Church of England church in Garstang, a market town in Lancashire, England. It is an active Church of England parish church in the Diocese of Blackburn and the archdeaconry of Lancaster. The church was built in 1770 as a chapel of ease to St Helen's Church in nearby Kirkland and was later assigned its own parish. It is recorded in the National Heritage List for England as a designated Grade II listed building.

== History ==
Historically, the township of Garstang was part of the ecclesiastical parish of the same name. Garstang's parish church was St Helen's Church, approximately 2 miles (3 km) away in the township of Kirkland. A chapel of ease to St Helen's was built in the township of Garstang in the 15th century. The chapel was dedicated to the Holy Trinity. By the 18th century, this chapel had fallen into disuse.

In 1770, a new chapel was built on a different site in the town and dedicated to Saint Thomas; the architect was Richard Gillow. In 1879, a chancel was added to the church, probably by Lancaster-based architecture firm Paley and Austin. (Note: Although Price (1998) lists St Thomas' as one of Paley & Austin's works, Hartwell & Pevsner (2009) mention only a chancel added in 1875 by Longworth & Gardner.) In 1881, St Thomas' became a parish church in its own right. Around this time, the churchyard was enlarged.

== Architecture ==
St Thomas' Church is built of sandstone rubble and its roofs are slate. The plan consists of a nave with a tower to the west, a chancel and a transept to the north. The tower is square with extensions to the north and south. It has round-headed bell openings.

The three-light east window contains a stained glass image of Saint Thomas, designed by Carl Almquist of the Lancaster-based firm Shrigley & Hunt. There is also a depiction of the Ascension of Jesus by the same firm. There is a bronze sculpture of Christ in the chancel, designed in 1974 by Josefina de Vasconcellos.

== External features ==
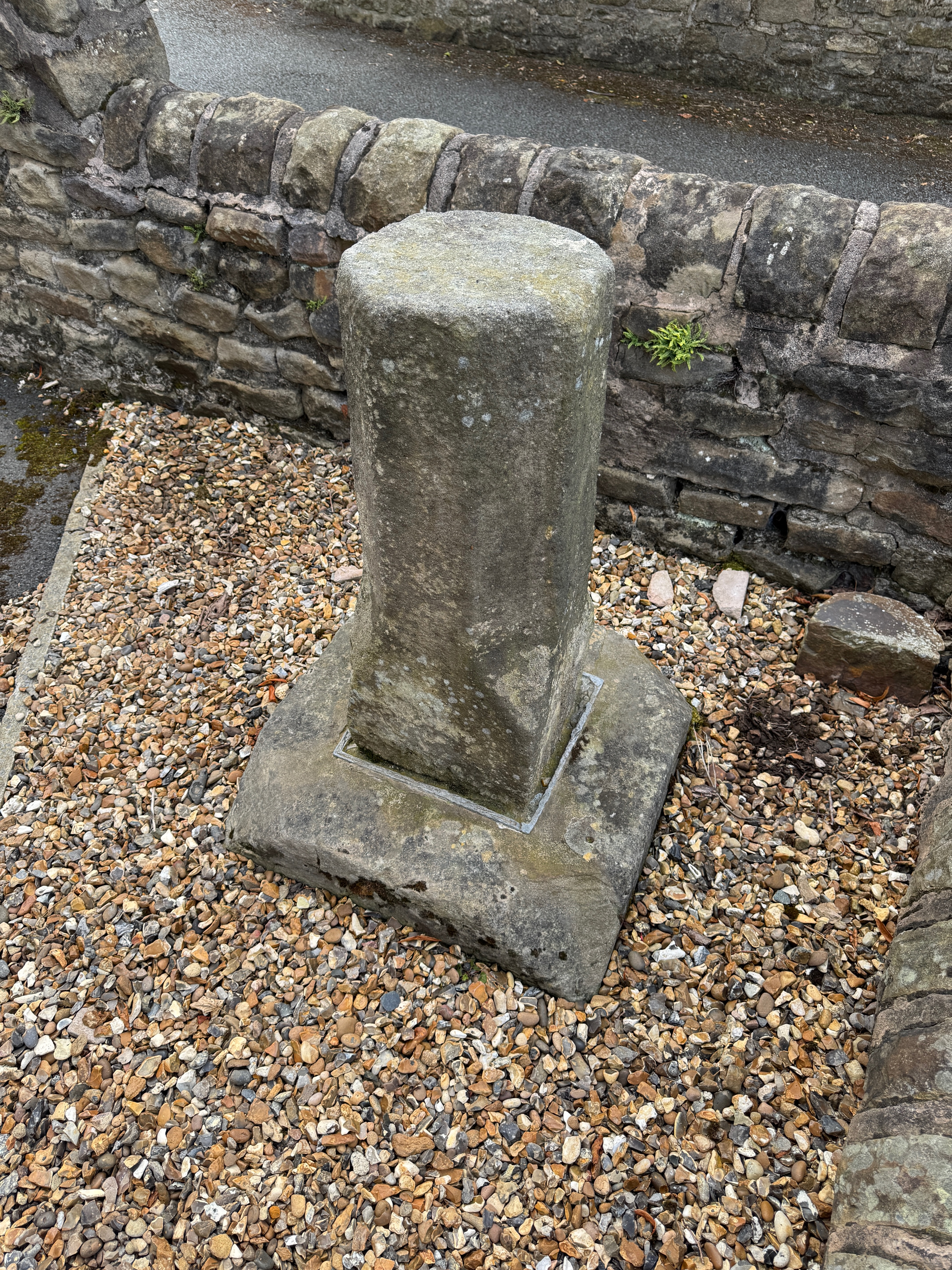
Cross base

In the churchyard, there are the remains of a medieval sandstone cross (listed as a "cross base"). It has a rectangular base and shaft. The churchyard also contains the war graves of a British and an Australian soldier of World War I.

== Assessment and administration ==
St Thomas' was designated as a Grade II listed building on 17 April 1967. The sandstone cross base and shaft in the churchyard have also received a Grade II designation. The Grade II designation—the lowest of the three grades—is for buildings that are "nationally important and of special interest". Hartwell and Pevsner (2009) describe the church as a "cheap uninspired job".

St Thomas' is an active parish church in the Anglican Diocese of Blackburn, which is part of the Province of York. It is in the archdeaconry of Lancaster and the Deanery of Garstang.

== See also ==
- Listed buildings in Garstang
- List of ecclesiastical works by Paley and Austin
