= Church of St Mary and St Michael, Bonds =

Coordinates: 53.8975°N 2.7710°W

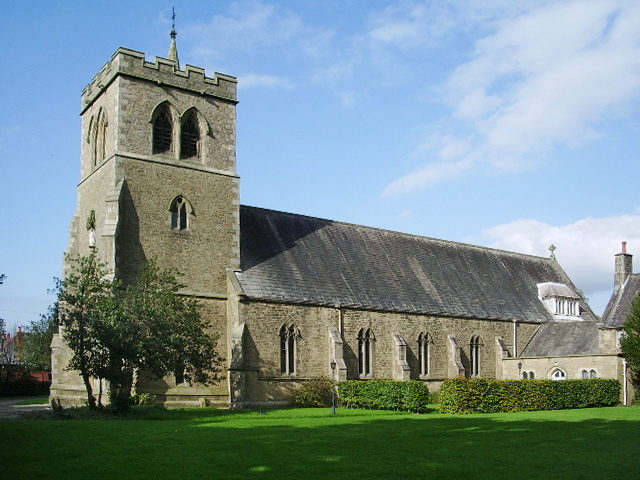
- The Church of St Mary and St Michael, Bonds, from the southwest

- Location in the Borough of Wyre
- OS grid reference: SD 494,449
- Location: Bonds, Lancashire
- Country: England
- Denomination: Roman Catholic
- Website: St Mary and St Michael, Bonds

Architecture
- Functional status: Active
- Heritage designation: Grade II
- Designated: 9 January 1986
- Architect: E. G. Paley
- Architectural type: Church
- Style: Gothic Revival
- Groundbreaking: 1857
- Completed: 1858

Specifications
- Materials: Sandstone, slate roofs

Clergy
- Priest: Fr Tom Butler

The Church of St Mary and St Michael is in the village of Bonds, to the south of Garstang, Lancashire, England. It is an active Roman Catholic church in the diocese of Lancaster. The church is recorded in the National Heritage List for England as a designated Grade II listed building.

== History ==
The church replaced an earlier chapel in the town of Garstang, and was built in 1857–58. The church and associated presbytery, schools and schoolmaster's house were designed by the Lancaster architect E. G. Paley. The church had seating for 600 people. The full development cost £7,000 (equivalent to £750,000 in 2025). The authors of the Buildings of England series comment that the church is a "big solid job", and that it is "by far the largest and most imposing [church] of the town".

== Architecture ==
=== Exterior ===
The church is constructed in sandstone rubble and has slate roofs. Its plan consists of a five-bay nave and a chancel under a continuous roof, a north aisle with a Lady chapel at the east end, a north porch, and a west tower. The tower is in three stages, with diagonal buttresses, an embattled parapet, and a stair turret rising to a greater height than the tower and surmounted by a spirelet. On its west front is an arched doorway and a three-light window. The windows along the sides of the church have two lights, and are separated by buttresses. At the east end of the chapel is a two-light window, and the east window of the chancel has five lights. The chancel roof contains a dormer window on each side.

=== Interior ===
The arcade consists of pointed arches carried on round columns with capitals. At the west end is a gallery. The nave has an open timber roof, and the chancel a barrel roof. The large reredos is in Caen stone, and is decorated with arcading. The altar and the altar rail both have marble shafts. At the entry to the sacristy is a stoup incorporating a stone inscribed with the date 1639. The stained glass dates from the later part of the 19th century, and was probably made by Hardman. The two-manual organ in the west gallery was made in 1949 by Henry Ainscough and Company of Preston. It was designed by Dr J. Reginald Dixon of Lancaster Cathedral, who also designed the organ case. The organ was restored in 1989 by the Pendlebury Organ Company of Fleetwood.

== See also ==
- Listed buildings in Barnacre-with-Bonds
- List of ecclesiastical works by E. G. Paley
