= Calder Vale =

Coordinates: 53.907°N 2.712°W

- Village
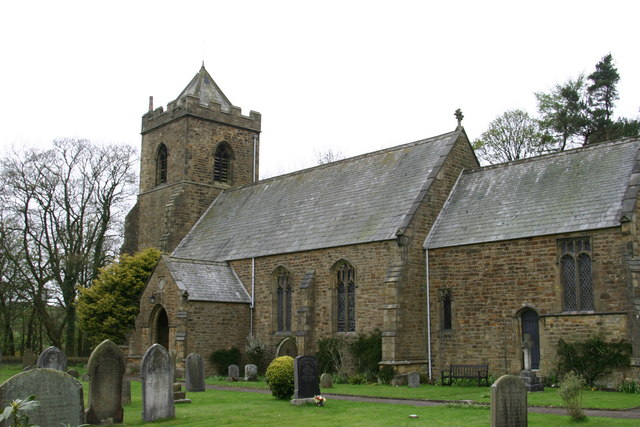
- St John's Church

- Location in Wyre Borough Location in the Forest of Bowland Location within Lancashire
- Population: 2,148 (2011.Ward)
- OS grid reference: SD535455
- Civil parish: Barnacre-with-Bonds
- District: Wyre
- Shire county: Lancashire
- Region: North West
- Country: England
- Sovereign state: United Kingdom
- Post town: PRESTON
- Postcode district: PR3
- Dialling code: 01995
- Police: Lancashire
- Fire: Lancashire
- Ambulance: North West
- UK Parliament: Lancaster and Wyre

Calder Vale is an English village, located on the edge of the Forest of Bowland in Lancashire. It lies on the River Calder in a deep valley with only a single cul-de-sac providing vehicular access. The name Calder is thought to be derived from the Old Norse kaldr, which means "cold".

The village was founded by Quakers Jonathan and Richard Jackson, and in 1835 a cotton-weaving mill — the Lappet Mill — was built, powered by the River Calder. The mill and mill pond still exist and Lappet Mill is still working as a cotton mill.

The church of St John the Evangelist lies high above the village, linked to it by a half-mile woodland footpath (compared with a three-mile journey by road). It was consecrated on 12 August 1863. It serves the adjacent village of Oakenclough, in addition to Calder Vale.

The village also contains a primary school, Calder Vale Church of England School, which was built concurrently with the church. It is a small school consisting of two teachers and about thirty pupils, and it is situated next door to St John's Church, the two being very closely linked.

There is also a village hall and a Methodist chapel in the village centre. The village also has Scouts and Brownies, a Women's Institute, which meets monthly in the village hall, and a Village Club.

There is a post office within the village hall.

Every Sunday in May, the villagers organise the "BlueBell Teas", at which cakes, sandwiches and local produce are sold for charity, and for the upkeep of the village hall and mission room. On the second Saturday of June every year, there is a village festival.

The elected Member for Wyre Borough Council's Calder Ward is Councillor David Meirion Williams.

== Governance ==
The village falls in the electoral ward of Calder. This ward stretches south-east to Barnacre. The total ward population at the 2011 census was 2,148.

== Gallery ==
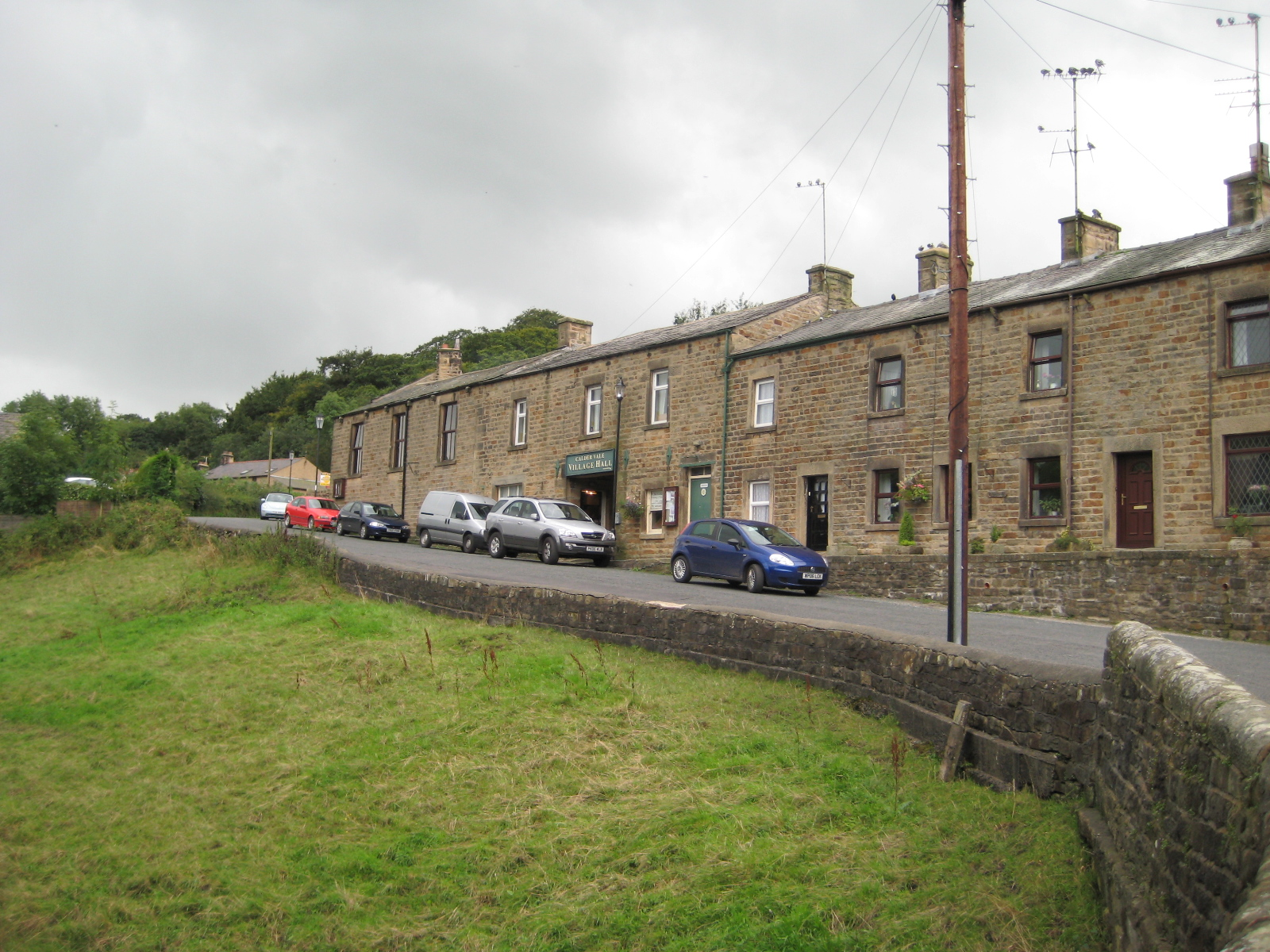
The terraced housing that makes up the village's Victoria Terrace. The village hall, with its green sign, is in view

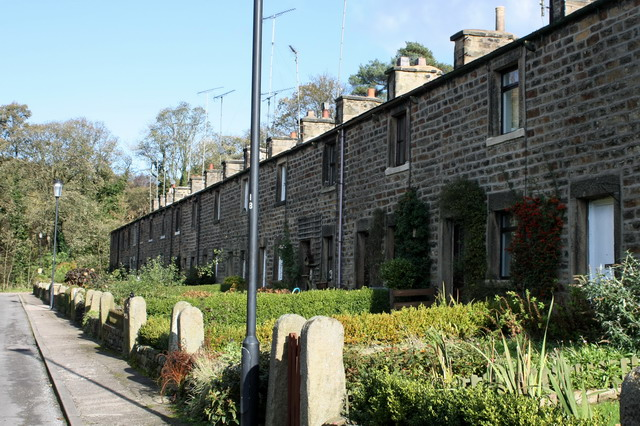
Another flank of terraced houses, on the aptly named Long Row, stands next to the Methodist chapel

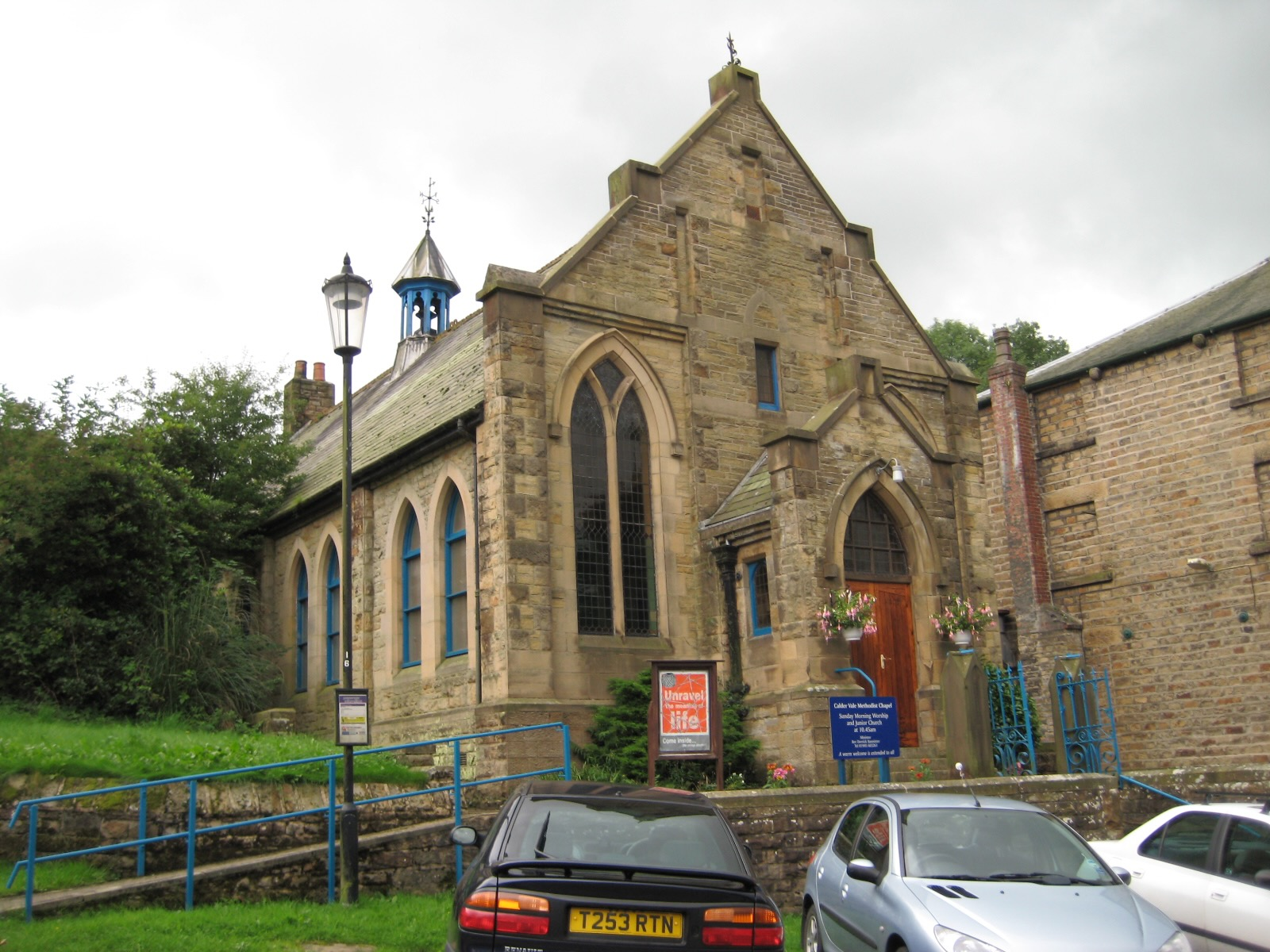
Methodist chapel

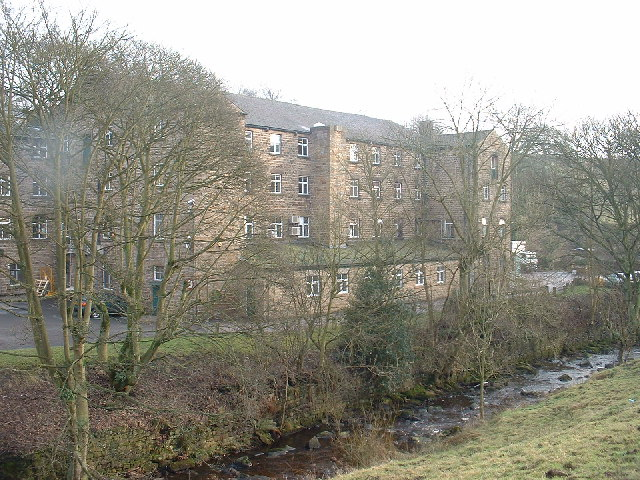
Lappet Mill

== See also ==
- Listed buildings in Barnacre-with-Bonds
