= Bowgreave =

Coordinates: 53.889°N 2.767°W

- Village
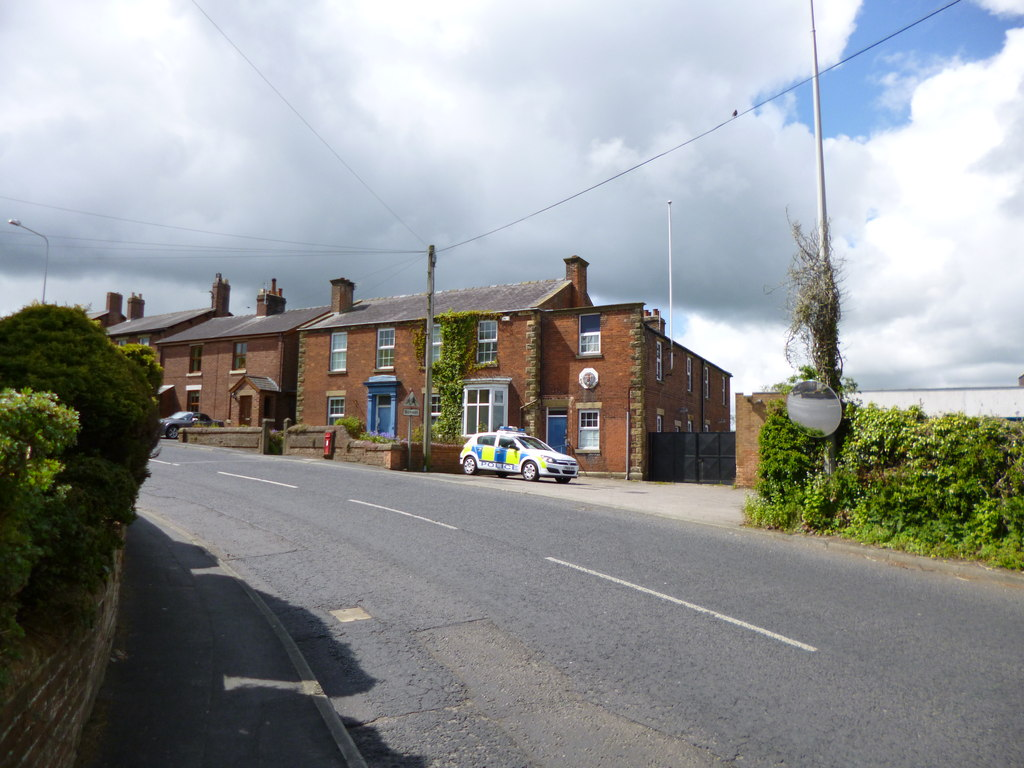
- Police station, Bowgreave

- Shown within Wyre Borough Location within Lancashire
- OS grid reference: SD495439
- Civil parish: Barnacre-with-Bonds
- District: Wyre
- Shire county: Lancashire
- Region: North West
- Country: England
- Sovereign state: United Kingdom
- Post town: PRESTON
- Postcode district: PR3
- Dialling code: 01995
- Police: Lancashire
- Fire: Lancashire
- Ambulance: North West
- UK Parliament: Lancaster and Wyre

Bowgreave is a village in the parish of Barnacre-with-Bonds, Lancashire, England. Its nearest town is Garstang, a mile to the north.

== Education ==
Garstang Community Academy is a secondary school within the village.

== Transport ==
Transport in the village as of April 2026 is run by Stagecoach Cumbria and North Lancashire. Three routes serve the village: the 40/41 to Preston or to Lancaster/Morecambe, and the 42 to Blackpool or Lancaster.

== See also ==
- Listed buildings in Barnacre-with-Bonds
