= Greenhalgh Castle =

Ruins near Garstang, Lancashire, England

- Near Garstang in England
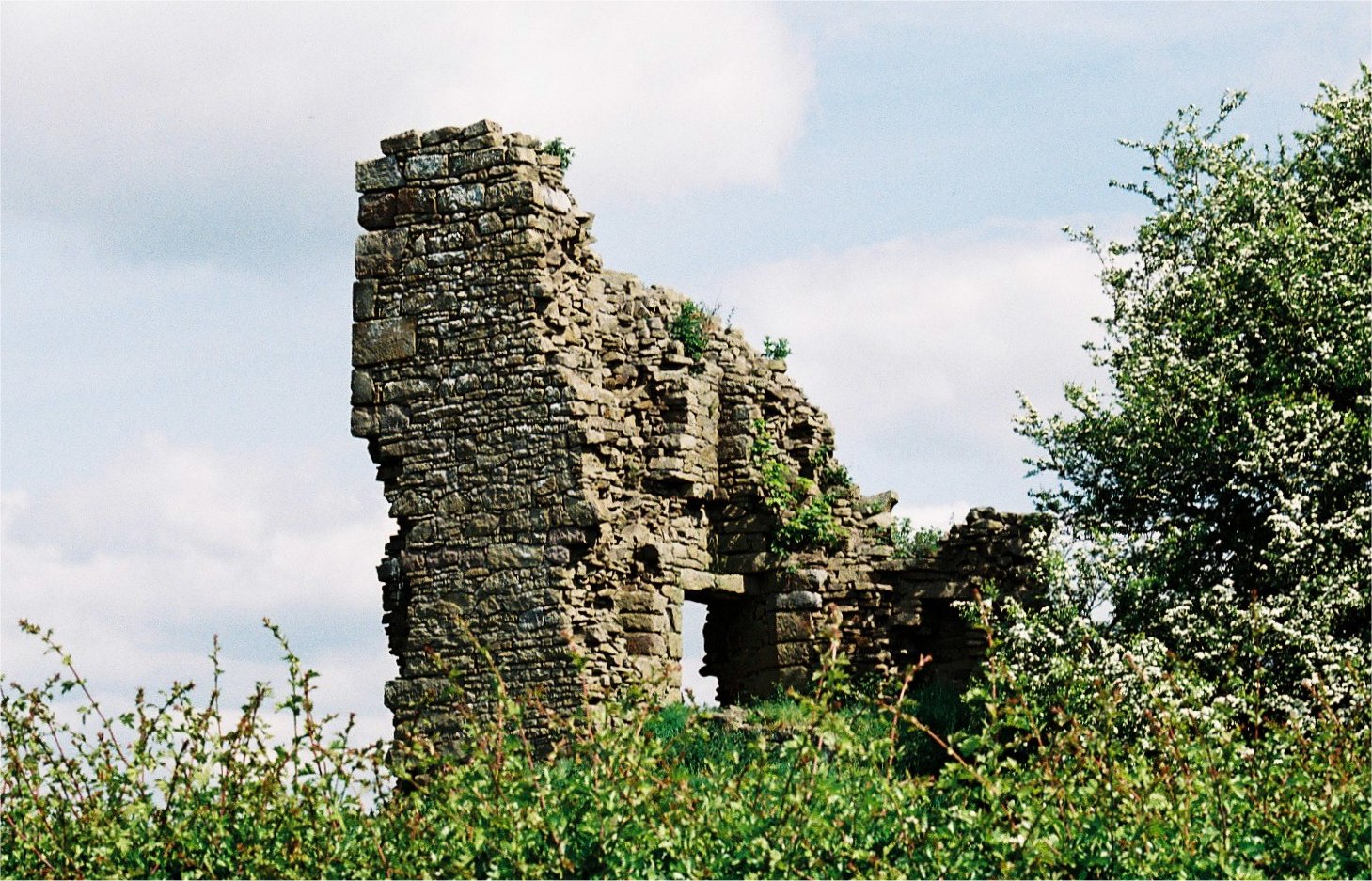

Site information
- Type: Castle
- Open to the public: No
- Condition: Ruined

Location
- Location in the Borough of Wyre
- Coordinates: 53.8998°N 2.7618°W

Site history
- Built: 1490
- Built by: Thomas Stanley

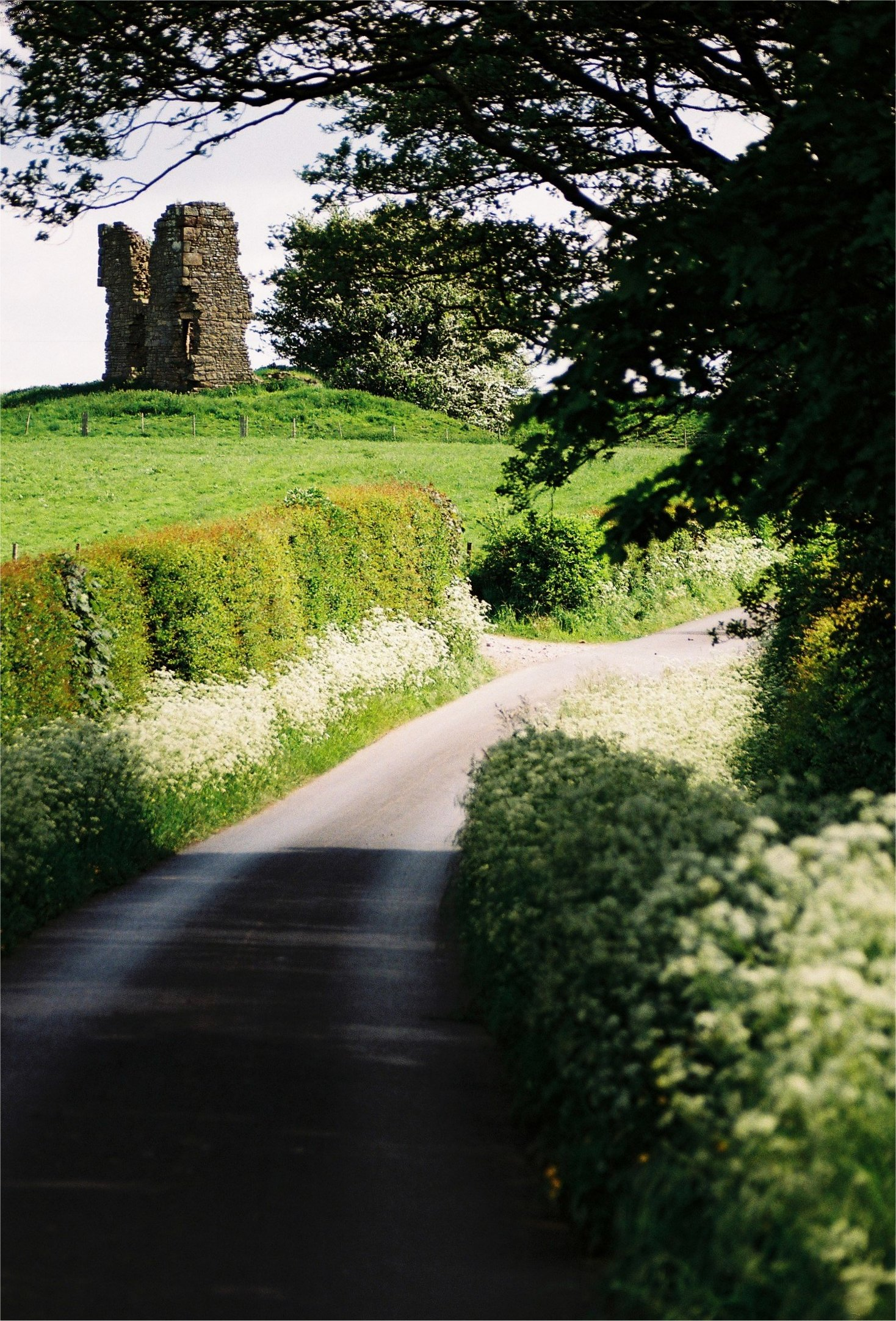

Greenhalgh Castle is a castle, now ruined, near the town of Garstang in Lancashire, England.

Thomas Stanley, 1st Earl of Derby, had the castle built in 1490 to provide defence for his estates around Garstang. He was also allowed to enclose a park and have in it 'free warren and chase'. The land on which the castle was built is said to be a gift to Stanley from his stepson Henry Tudor for his assistance in defeating Richard III at the Battle of Bosworth. In the 16th century John Leland described it as a 'pretty castle of the lords of Derby'.

During the English Civil War the castle was garrisoned by James Stanley, 7th Earl of Derby in support of Charles I. It was one of the last two Royalist strongholds in Lancashire to succumb following a bitter siege during 1644/45 by Oliver Cromwell's forces. The other was Lathom. The siege was led by Colonel Dodding and Major Joseph Rigbie. The garrison at Greenhalgh Castle eventually surrendered in May 1645 provisional on their being granted safe conduct to return to their homes unharmed. Thereafter, demolition teams partially destroyed the castle to ensure that it could not be used again for military purposes. Following continued deterioration of the ruins, the only remains of the original four towers is the lower portion of one. Many of the local farmhouses, including the neighbouring Castle Farm which was built in the 17th century, have incorporated the stones from the castle ruins into their buildings. In 1772 Thomas Pennant described it as 'the poor remains of Greenhalgh Castle'.

== See also ==
- Scheduled monuments in Lancashire

== Other sources ==
- Collinson, E. (1993), Greenhalgh Castle, Garstang and The Earls of Derby, ISBN 978-0-9522803-0-9
