= Garstang Community Academy =

Secondary school in Lancashire, England

Coordinates: 53.8894°N 2.7659°W

Location
- Garstang Road; Garstang, Lancashire, PR3 1YE; England

Information
- Type: Academy
- Motto: Excellence in Everyone
- Established: 21 October 1958
- Local authority: Lancashire County Council
- Department for Education URN: 137342 Tables
- Ofsted: Reports
- Chair: Kim Carlyle
- Head teacher: Satinder Singh
- Gender: Mixed
- Age: 11 to 16
- Enrollment: Approximately 800
- Colours: Navy & Red
- Website: http://www.garstangcommunityacademy.com

Garstang Community Academy (formerly Garstang High School) is a secondary school with academy status in the parish of Barnacre-with-Bonds near Garstang in Lancashire, England. It is a coed institution serving children aged 11 to 16. It is non denominational, and non boarding. It opened on 21 October 1958.
