= Reveal (carpentry) =

Type of joint

Reveal: Door frame example

In carpentry, a reveal is a feature resembling a rabbet, but constructed of separate pieces of wood. A reveal may typically be seen at the edge of a door or window, where the face molding is set back, often by a distance from 3/16 in (4.8 mm) to 1/2 in (13 mm). (This noun is unrelated to the verb reveal but is from the obsolete verb revale 'to lower, bring down,' which is related to vale and valley.)

A "tight reveal" is where the distance to the edge of the casing is kept as small as possible, to give a smoother, more consistent look, often thought to be more contemporary. This is often achieved on a cabinet door by notching out the area of the door where the hinge mounts.
