= River Calder, Wyre =

River in Lancashire, England

River Calder
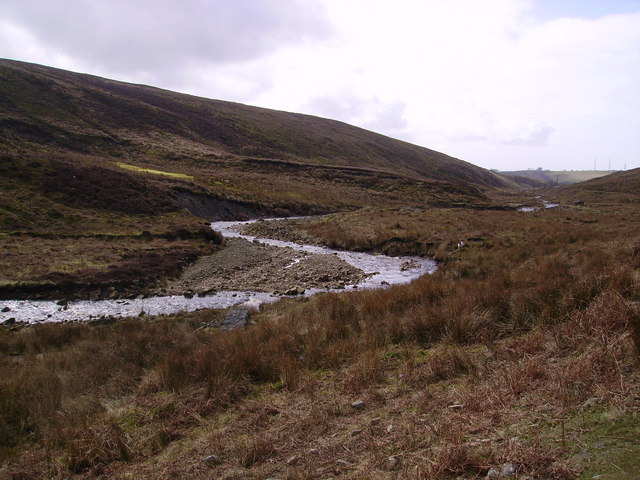
- The River Calder, near its source

Physical characteristics
- Source: Fiendsdale Head
  - location: Forest of Bowland, Lancashire
  - coordinates: 53°55′50.6″N 2°38′14.4″W
  - elevation: 1,440 feet (440 m)
- Mouth: Barnacre-with-Bonds
  - location: Catterall
  - coordinates: 53°52′55.1″N 2°46′28.8″W
  - elevation: 43 feet (13 m)
- Length: 13 mi (21 km)
- Basin size: 28 km^{2} (11 sq mi)

The River Calder is a 13-mile (21 km) long river that is one of the main tributaries of the River Wyre in Lancashire, England. Like the other rivers in England with the name Calder, its name is thought to derive from a mixture of Old Welsh and Old British words meaning "hard and violent water or stream".

== Description ==
The river rises near Fiendsdale Head in the Forest of Bowland and flows first westwards then southwards through the villages of Oakenclough and Calder Vale before passing under the M6 motorway, West Coast Main Line and under the Calder Aqueduct on Lancaster Canal. It meets the Wyre at Catterall near the town of Garstang, at which point the Calder forms the boundary between the parishes of Catterall and Barnacre-with-Bonds.

Just west of the M6 Motorway, a feeder section supplies water via a siphon from the River Calder to the Lancaster canal; this intake has the ability to abstract the entire flow of water from the River Calder causing critical flow conditions further west of this point to its mouth with the River Wyre. Similarly, Barnacre and Grizedale Lea Reservoirs, which built in the 1800s just west of Oakenclough, can take all the flow from the upper reaches of the River Calder with no compensation during periods of low flow.

The Calder is one of two rivers in Lancashire with the same name; the other River Calder flows from Burnley and into the River Ribble.

== Settlements ==
- Oakenclough
- Calder Vale
- Catterall

== Tributaries ==
- Little Calder River
- Nanny Brook
- Calder Dyke
- East Grain
- North Grain

== Gallery ==
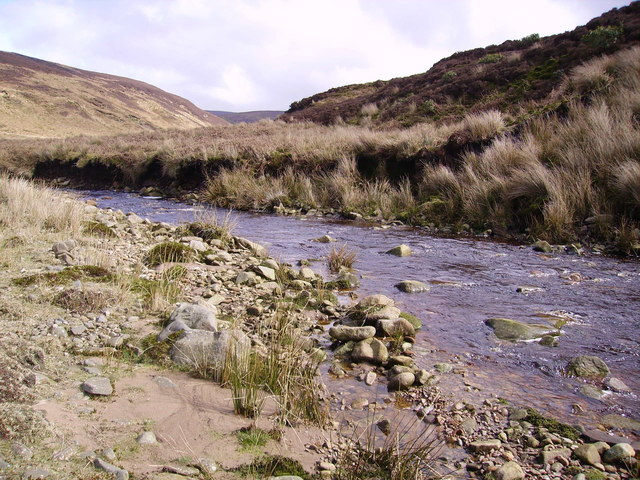
The River Calder in its upper reaches

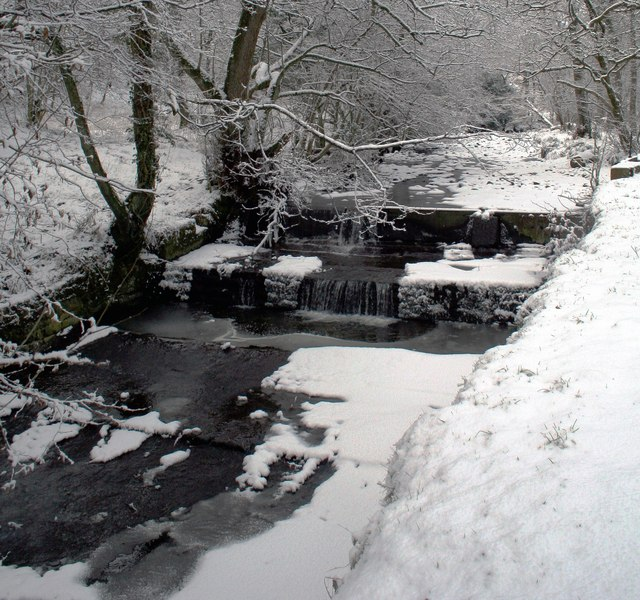
Mill Pond Weir St Johns Wood Calder Vale after Snowfall

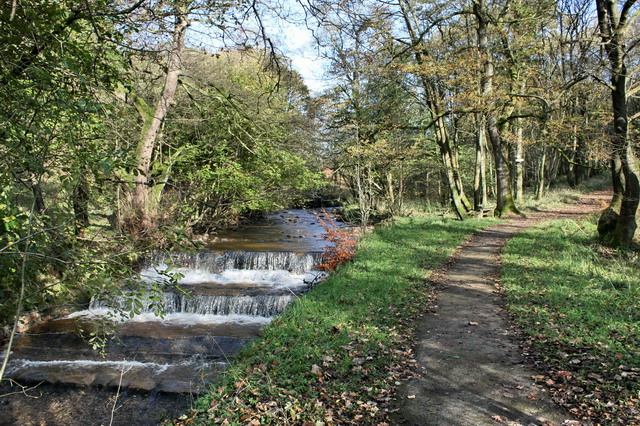
Weir and Path Above Calder Vale

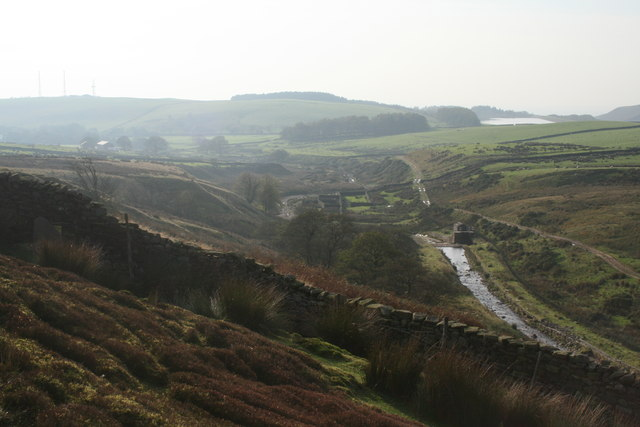
Calder Intake

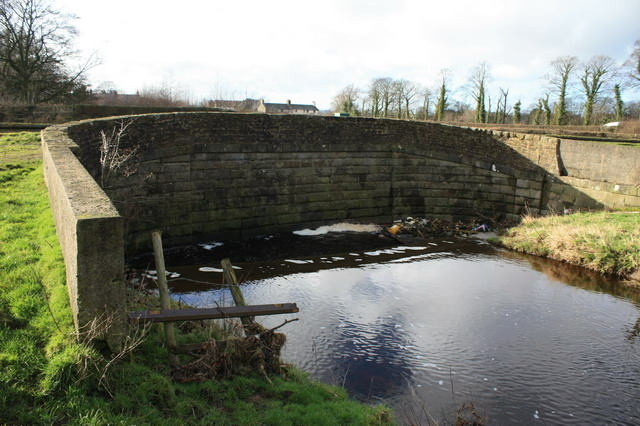
River Calder going under the Calder Aqueduct

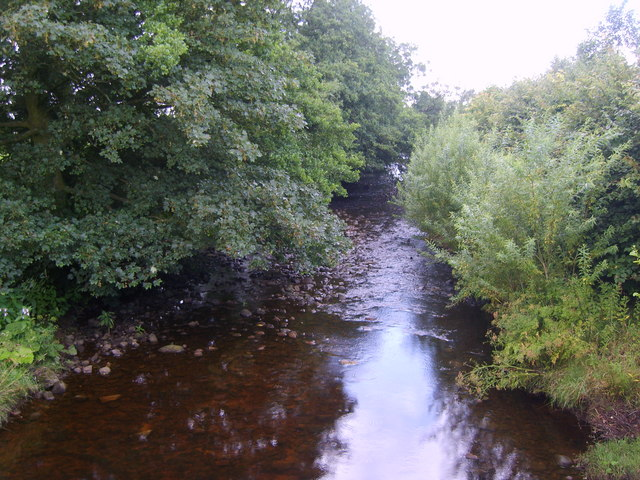
River Calder looking downstream from the Calder Aqueduct
