= Garstang =

Market town in Lancashire, England

Coordinates: 53.903°N 2.767°W

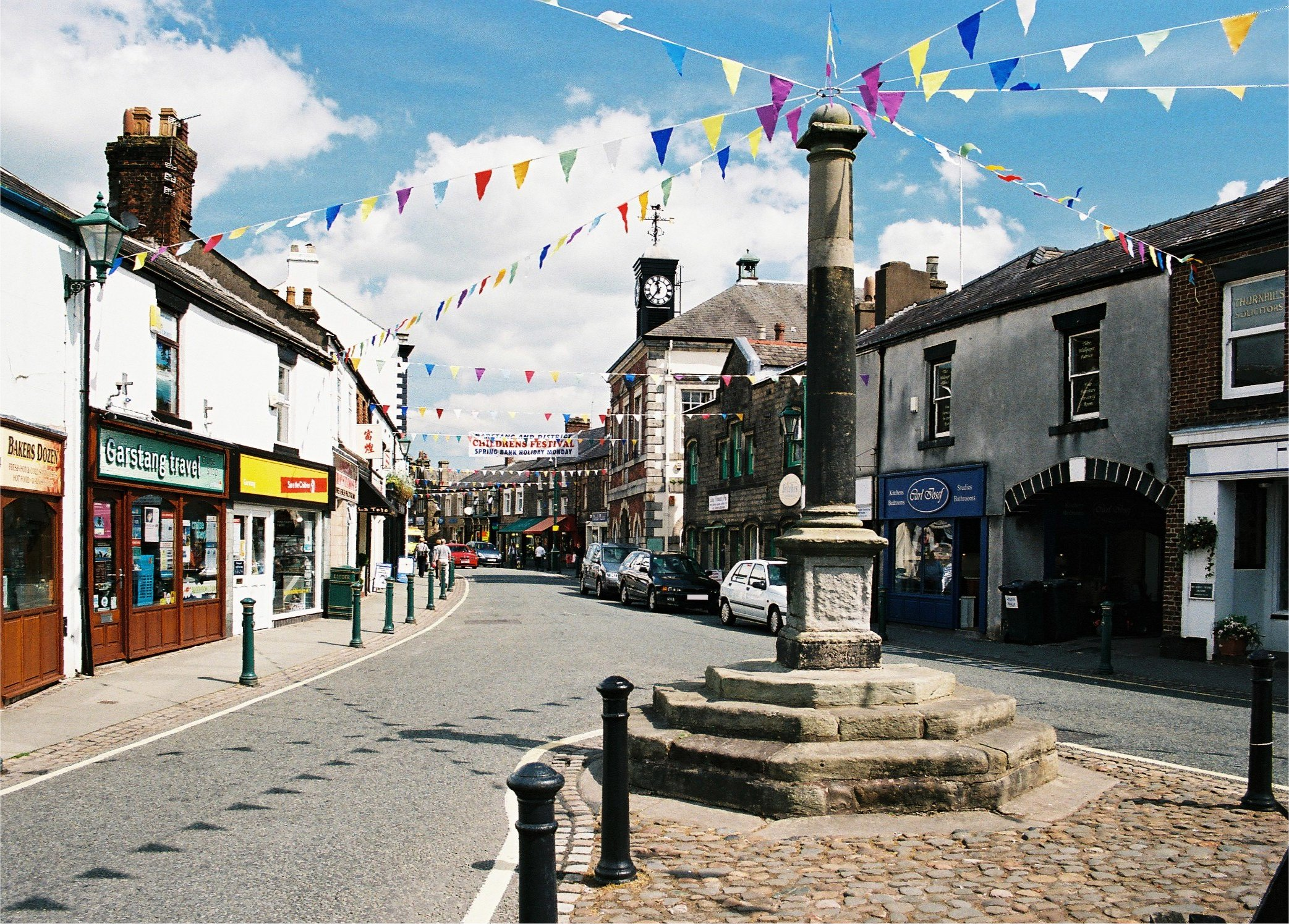
- Market Cross in Market Place

- Shown within Wyre Borough Location within Lancashire
- Population: 7,041 (2021 Census)
- OS grid reference: SD495455
  - London: 199 miles (320 km) SE
- Civil parish: Garstang
- District: Borough of Wyre
- Shire county: Lancashire
- Region: North West
- Country: England
- Sovereign state: United Kingdom
- Post town: PRESTON
- Postcode district: PR3
- Dialling code: 01995
- Police: Lancashire
- Fire: Lancashire
- Ambulance: North West
- UK Parliament: Lancaster and Wyre

Garstang is an ancient market town and civil parish within the Borough of Wyre, in Lancashire, England. It lies equidistant between the cities of Lancaster to the north and Preston to the south, both are 10 miles (16 km) away. In 2021, the parish had a total resident population of 4,428; In the 2021 Census, the larger Garstang Built-up Area, which includes the adjoining settlements of Bonds and Cabus, had a population of 5,804.

== Toponymy ==
Garstang is mentioned in the Domesday Book of 1086 as Cherestanc. Later recordings of the name include Geresteng, Gairstang in 1195; Grestein, 1204; Gayrestan, 1236; Gayerstang, 1246; Gayrstang, 1274; and Gayrestang, 1292.

The original spelling of Garstang has several interpretations: "'gore by the boundary pole", "spear post", "triangular piece of land", "common land" or "meadowland". Possibly signifying the site of a meeting-space. The Old Norse derivation being 'geiri', a gore, from 'geirr', with 'stang' or 'stǫng', meaning "pole" or "boundary marker", or the Saxon derivation 'Gaerstung'. It is probable that the historic market cross is this same site.

== History ==
=== Early history ===
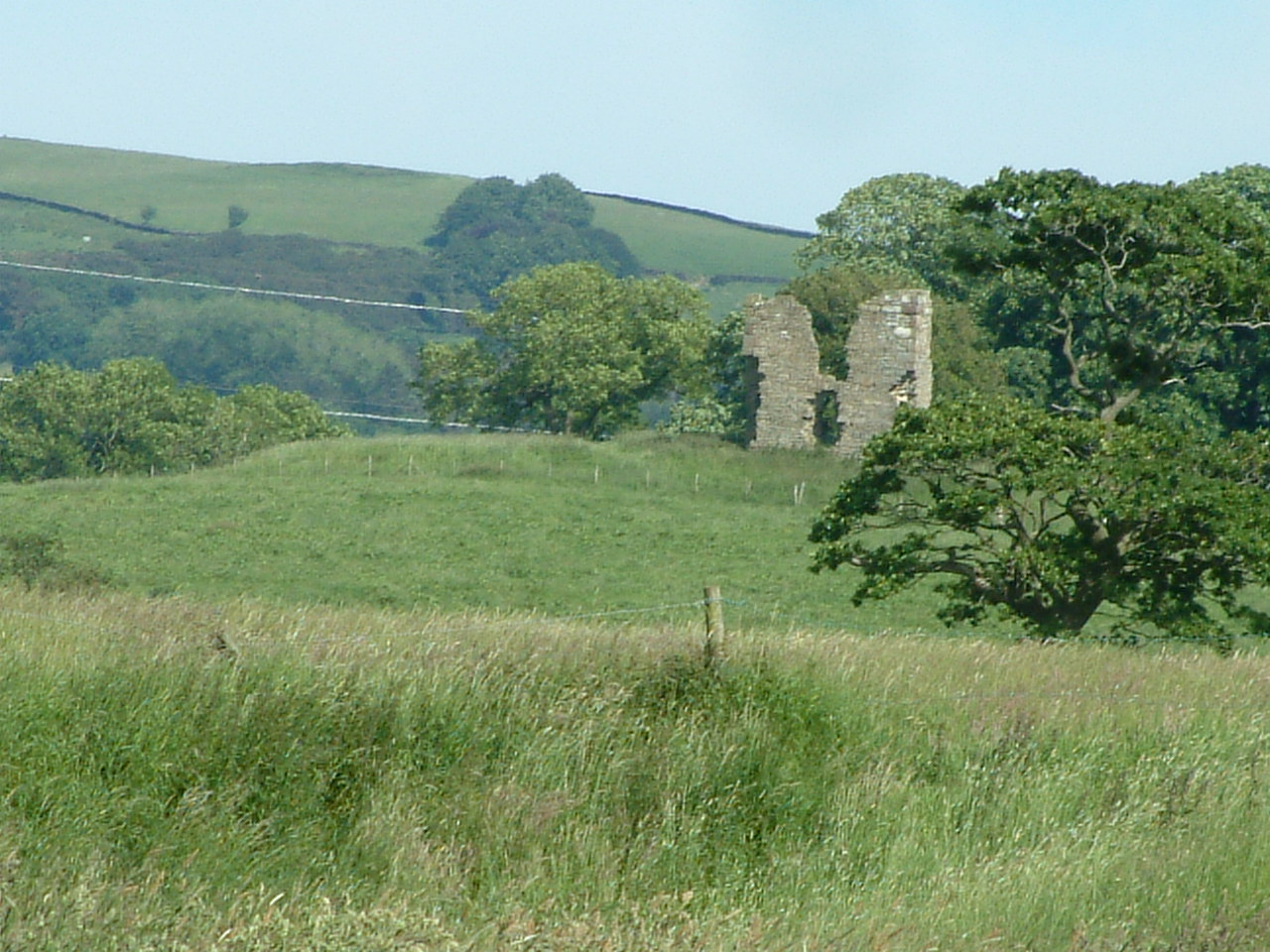
Greenhalgh Castle

A brief but comprehensive history of the parish, including the parish church of St Helen in Churchtown and Greenhalgh Castle, can be found in "The Parish of Garstang", A History of the County of Lancaster: Volume 7. St. John Plessington was born at Dimples Hall, which is just outside the town.

The town is overlooked by the ruined remains of Greenhalgh Castle, built in 1490 by Thomas Stanley, 1st Earl of Derby, at about the same time as the first stone bridge over the River Wyre. Garstang Town Hall was completed in 1764.

=== Modern history ===
Garstang's traditional market day on Thursdays dates back to the early 1300s and stretches the length of street. The Market Cross at the top of the High Street is one of the most familiar landmarks in the area.

The town celebrates an arts festival and an agricultural show annually in August, which has been continued for 200 years.

In April 2000, Garstang declared itself "the world's first Fairtrade Town", influencing many other towns, cities and counties around the United Kingdom to work towards the same goal. The Fairtrade Town status was renewed by the Fairtrade Foundation on 13 August 2003.

In 2011, a 518-foot (158 m) wind turbine, the UK's largest, was built in the town to provide power for Dewlay, a local factory producing the award-winning Garstang Blue cheese.

Following success in winning the Small Country Town category in the 2002 Britain in Bloom Awards, Garstang won the Small Town category in the 2005 and 2006; in 2010, it was invited to the Champion of Champions event.

== Governance ==
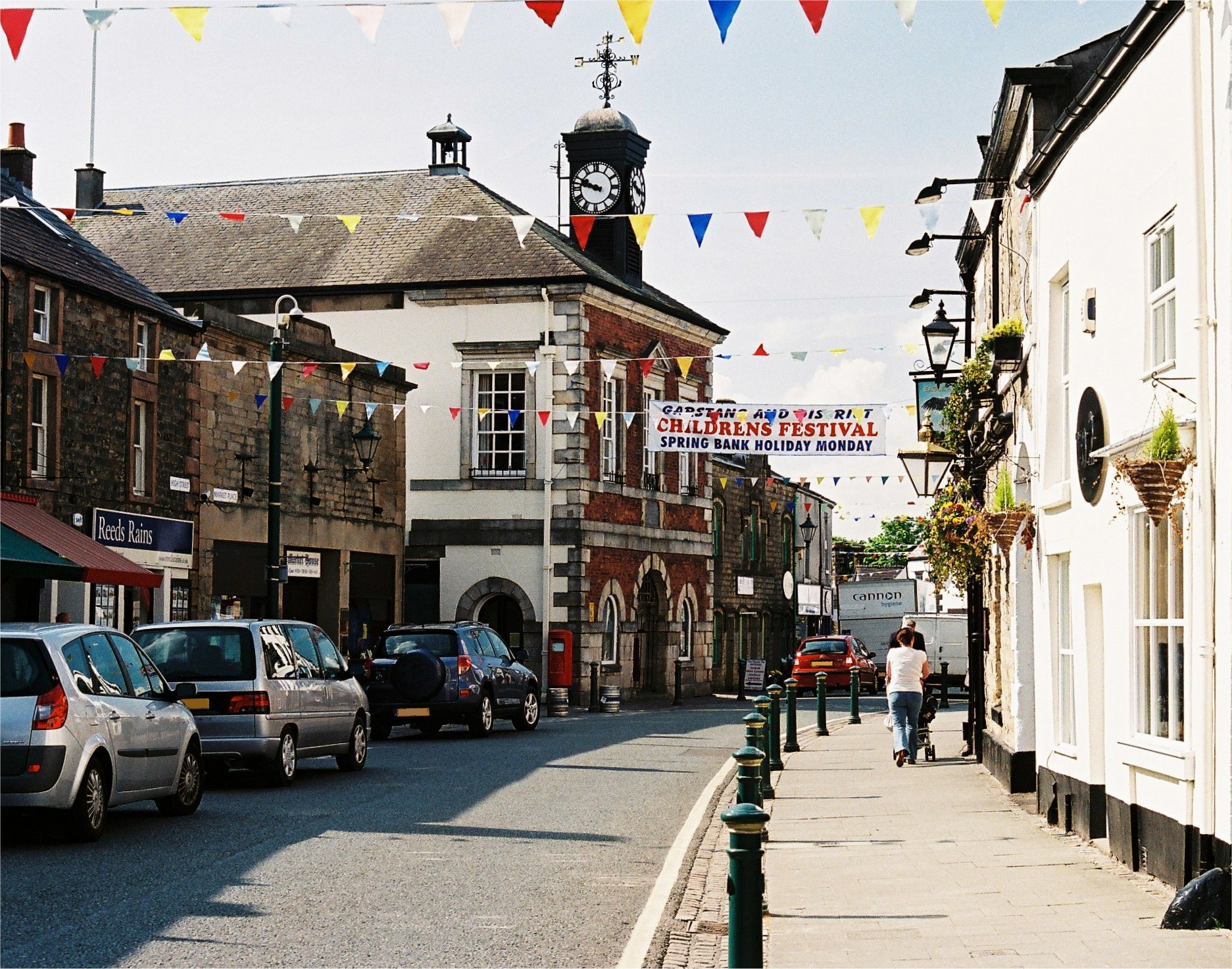
A view of Garstang Town Hall from the High Street

From a very early time, Garstang lay within the Amounderness Hundred of Lancashire. From 1894 until 1974, it formed its own local government district in the administrative county of Lancashire; the Garstang Rural District extended beyond the current civil parish boundaries and included villages such as Pilling.

Since 1974, Garstang has formed part of the borough of Wyre, although it retains an elected Town Council with limited jurisdiction. The borough ward has three councillors, including Lady Dulcie Atkins, wife of former MEP Sir Robert Atkins.

== Geography ==
The town is situated on the river Wyre, river Calder and the Lancaster Canal, Garstang is situated between Lancaster and Preston, close to the A6 road, the M6 motorway and the West Coast Main Line. It lies on the eastern edge of the Fylde and the Forest of Bowland is not far to the east.

Garstang and the nearby villages of Bonds, Bowgreave, Catterall and Western Claughton-on-Brock form an almost continuous built-up area, bypassed by the A6 road in 1928. (Note: Greenall gives the date incorrectly as 1926.) Other nearby villages not bypassed by the A6 road include Brock, Bilsborrow, Cabus and Churchtown form another, much larger, continuous built-up area which includes Garstang in the centre.

The population of the ward at the 2021 Census was 6,616.

== Amenities ==
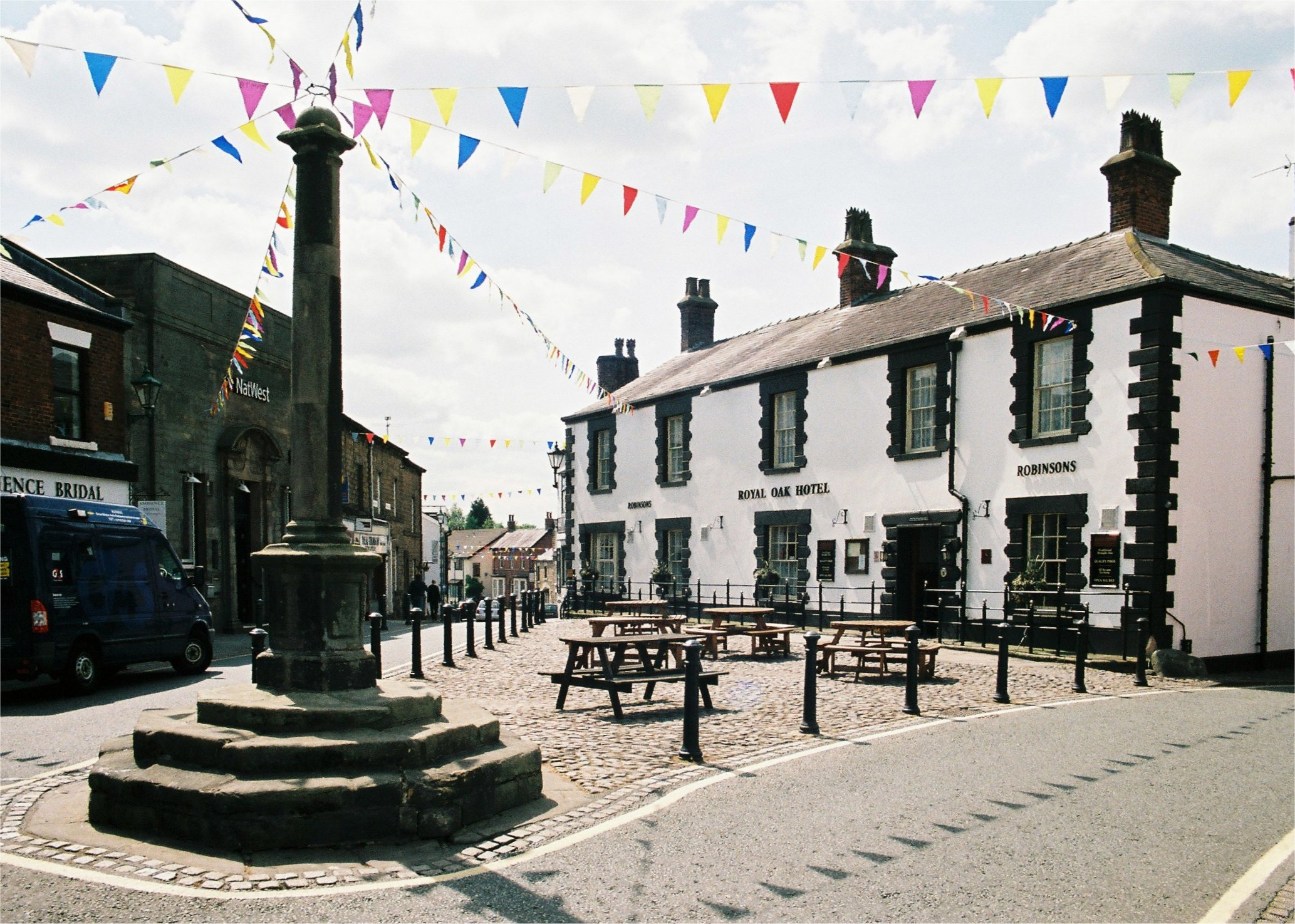
Market Cross and Royal Oak Hotel

Local primary schools are Garstang Community Primary School, Garstang St Thomas Church of England School and SS Mary & Michael Catholic School. The secondary school is Garstang Community Academy, which does not offer sixth form courses; pupils have to travel to Lancaster, Preston or Blackpool to study A-Level courses.

The town has seven public houses: The Farmers Arms, the Crown, the Eagle and Child, the King's Arms, the Royal Oak Hotel, the Wheatsheaf and Th'Owd Tithe Barn, with the Bellflower (formerly the Flag) in Nateby. It has three restaurants: Pipers, Ken Ma and the Great Season, the latter two serving Chinese food. There is also a golf club and country hotel on the A6 road.

The town is served by the Anglican church of St Thomas and the Catholic church of St Mary and St Michael, just outside the town's boundaries in Bonds. Until 1881, Garstang's official parish church was St Helen's, 2 miles (3.2 km) away in Churchtown.

== Transport ==
Bus routes are operated by Stagecoach Cumbria and North Lancashire, which connect the town with Preston, Lancaster and Morecambe.

The town was formerly served by two railway stations: Garstang and Catterall, which was closed in 1969, and Garstang Town, which closed to passengers in 1930. The nearest National Rail stations are now at Lancaster and Preston, which lie on the West Coast Main Line; between them, Avanti West Coast, Northern Trains and TransPennine Express operate services from both locations to London Euston, Manchester Piccadilly, Liverpool Lime Street, Carlisle and Glasgow Central.

Garstang lies on the A6 road, which connects Carlisle, Lancaster, Preston, Manchester, Derby and Luton. The M6 motorway passes to the east of the town and can be accessed at Preston or Lancaster.

== Media ==
Local news and television programmes are provided by BBC North West and ITV Granada. Television signals are received from the Winter Hill TV transmitter.

Local radio stations are BBC Radio Lancashire, Heart North West, Smooth North West, Capital Manchester and Lancashire, Greatest Hits Radio Lancashire and Central Radio North West.

The town's local newspaper was the Garstang Courier, which has now been absorbed into the Lancashire Evening Post.

== Sport ==
Garstang F.C. is a non-league football club; founded in 1885, it plays in the North West Counties League, having won the West Lancashire League Premier League and Richardson Cup double in 2018.

== In popular culture ==
Garstang is referenced in episode 5 of the first series of the comedy Phoenix Nights. Brian Potter, played by Peter Kay, said "What have you called us? What have you called the best cabaret lounge this side of Garstang?", in reference to an alternative comedy night being run at his fictional club.

== Notable people ==
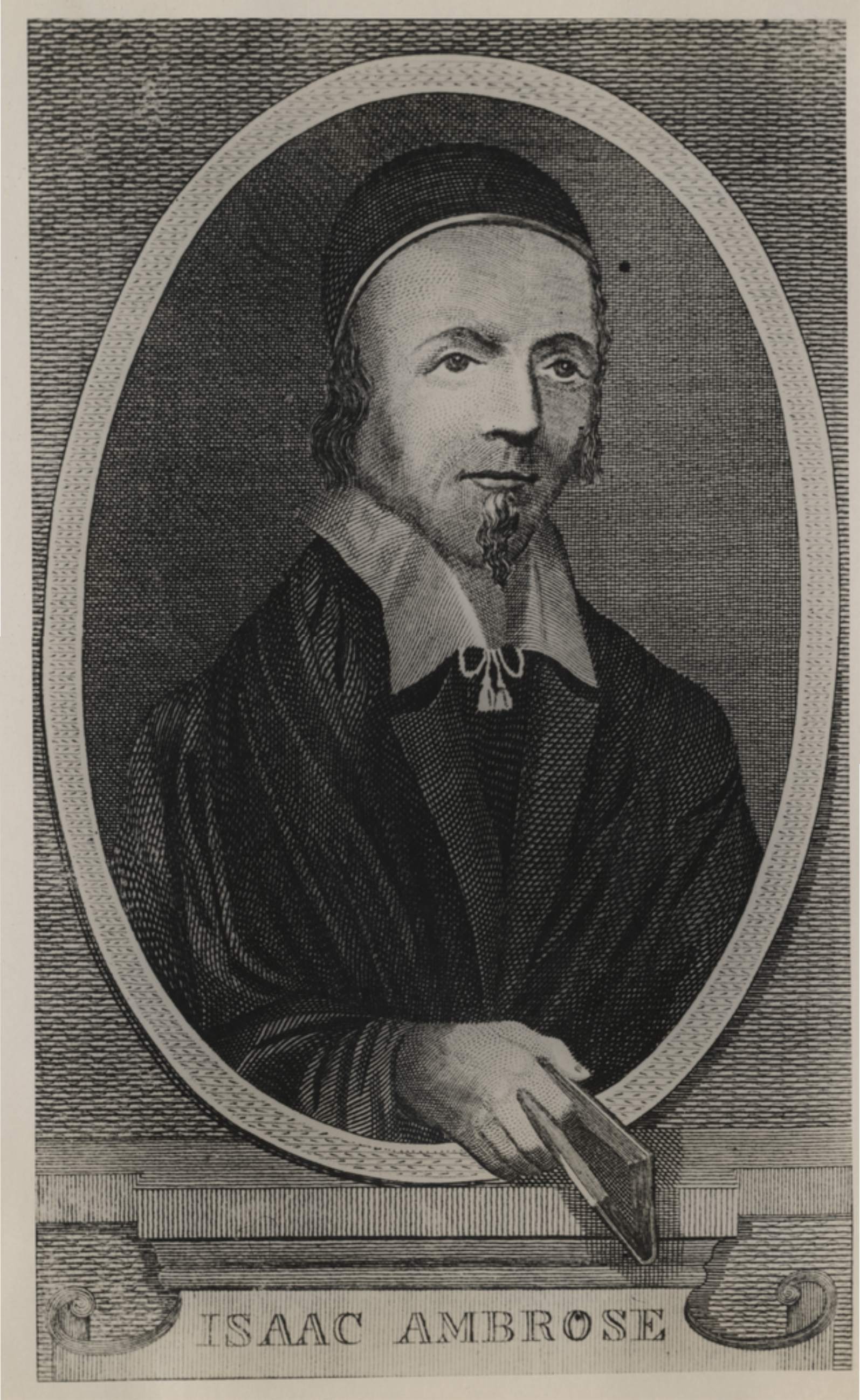
Isaac Ambrose

The following people have lived in or were born in Garstang:

- Isaac Ambrose (1604–1664), a Puritan vicar, ejected locally for nonconformity in 1662
- John Plessington (c. 1637–1679), Catholic priest, executed by the English Crown, RC saint and martyr
- Robert Terrill Rundle (1811–1896), a Methodist missionary noted for his work in Western Canada
- Thomas Hayton Mawson (1861–1933), a British garden designer, landscape architect and town planner.
- Sir Robert Atkins (born 1946), politician, MP from 1979 to 1997, MEP for North West England from 1999 to 2014; vice president of Lancashire County Cricket Club
- John Woolrich (born 1954), composer, lived in Garstang from 1955 to 1972
- Paul Swarbrick (born 1958), Roman Catholic Bishop of Lancaster since 2018
- Mary Anne Hobbs (born 1964), a BBC Radio 6 Music disc jockey, grew up locally.

=== Sport ===
- Dicky Bond (1883–1955), footballer, played 148 games for Preston North End and 301 for Bradford City
- Harry Dean (1884–1957), Lancashire cricketer who played three test matches for England and 267 first-class cricket matches.
- George Benson (1893–1974), a footballer who played 84 games, including at Accrington Stanley
- Arnold Whiteside (1911–1994), footballer who played 218 games for Blackburn Rovers
- Jason Robinson (born 1974), rugby player who played 302 games for Wigan Warriors, 159 for Sale Sharks and 51 for England rugby union
- Adam Phillips (born 1998), footballer who played 180 games, mostly for Barnsley.

== See also ==
- Listed buildings in Garstang.
