= List of ecclesiastical works by E. G. Paley =

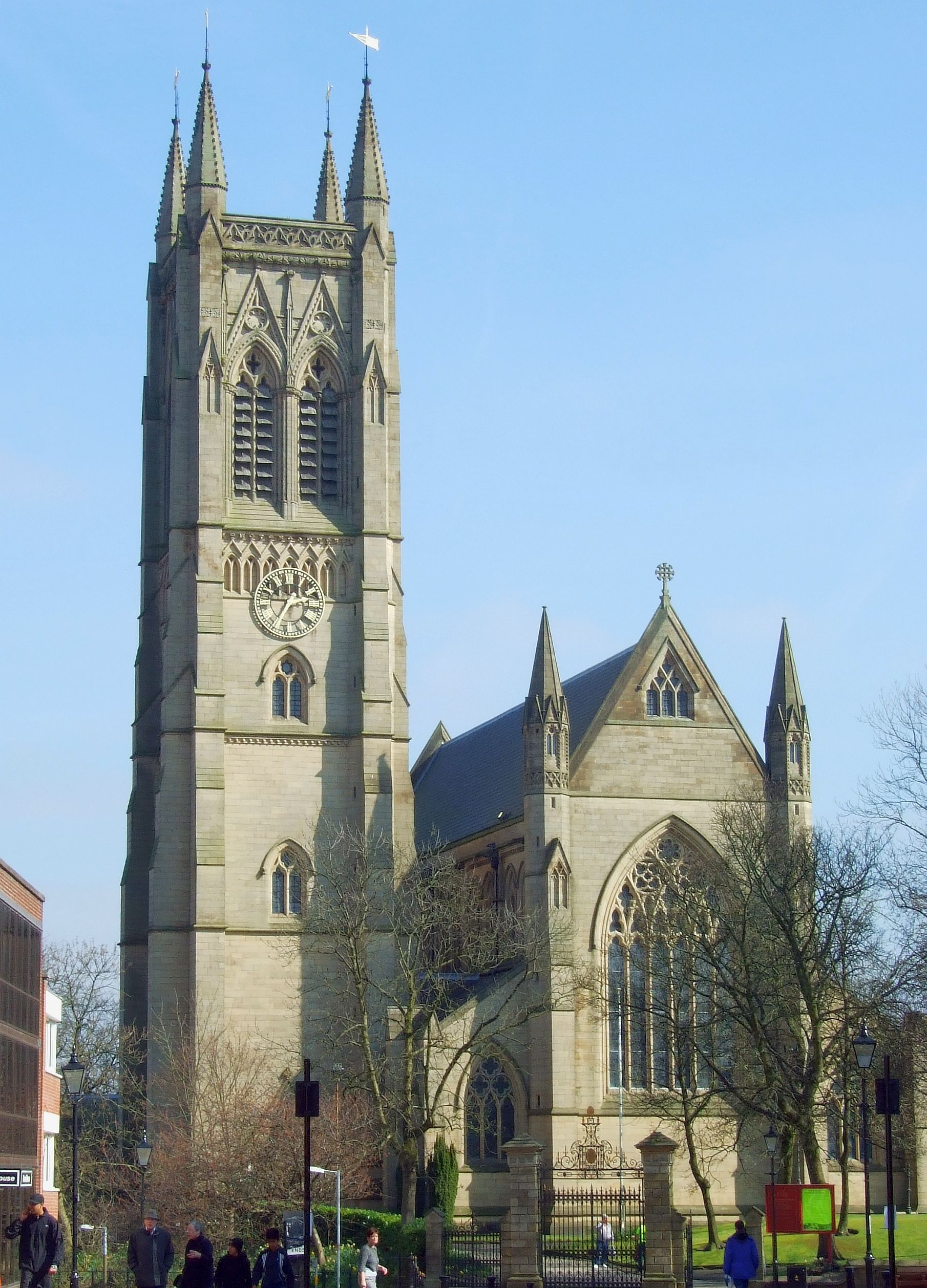
St Peter's Church, Bolton, which replaced the medieval parish church of the town

Edward Graham Paley (1823–95) (usually known as E. G. Paley) was an English architect who practised for the whole of his career from an office in Lancaster, Lancashire. He was born in Easingwold, North Yorkshire, and moved to Lancaster in 1838, when he was aged 15, to join Edmund Sharpe as a pupil. Sharpe had established an architectural practice in 1835, and in 1845 he took Paley into partnership. During the following years, Sharpe developed outside interests, and from 1847 Paley was responsible for most of the firm's work, carrying out commissions independently from at least 1849. Sharpe withdrew from the practice in 1851, although it continued to trade as Sharpe and Paley until 1856. Sharpe formally retired from the partnership that year, leaving Paley as sole principal. Paley continued to work without a partner until he was joined by Hubert Austin in 1868, when the practice became known as Paley and Austin. In 1886 Paley's son, Henry Paley (who was usually known as Harry) joined the partnership, and the name was changed to Paley, Austin and Paley, a title it retained until Edward Paley's death in 1895. This list contains the ecclesiastical works Paley undertook during the time he was the sole principal in the practice, between 1856 and 1868. There are 30 new or rebuilt churches or chapels in the list, and 18 churches that underwent restoration or alteration.

During the time Paley was being trained by Sharpe the practice was involved mainly with ecclesiastical work, although it also undertook commissions for country houses and smaller projects. When Paley became sole principal, he continued to work mainly on churches, designing new ones and restoring, rebuilding, and making additions and alterations to existing churches. In almost all his designs, Paley used the Gothic Revival style, initially with Early English or Decorated features. During the early 1860s he introduced Perpendicular features. One church was built in Neo-Norman style, All Saints, Lupton, and one in Transitional style, St Matthew, Little Lever. Paley also used the Neo-Norman style for St Michael's Chapel at Lancaster Moor Hospital.

Brandwood et al. (Note: Brandwood et al. is the most comprehensive published account of the Sharpe, Paley and Austin practice.) consider that Paley's finest church design was that of St Peter, Lancaster, (later Lancaster Cathedral) with its spire rising to 240 feet (73 m). Of his other churches, St James in Barrow-in-Furness, was described by Nikolaus Pevsner as the best church in the town. Hartwell, Hyde and Pevsner comment that St Peter, Bolton, is "formidable". Paley was an Anglican and most of his ecclesiastical work was carried out on Church of England churches: exceptions include St Mary and St Michael, Bonds, and St Peter, Lancaster, both Roman Catholic, and Clark Street Congregational Church, Morecambe. Most of the churches and chapels were built for local congregations, but Paley also designed chapels for Rossall School, and Lancaster Moor Hospital. Being based in Lancaster, Paley's commissions were mainly for works in the northwest of England, particularly in the former historical counties of Westmorland and Cumberland (later part of Cumbria), and Lancashire (parts of which were later incorporated into Greater Manchester and Merseyside). Further afield he restored St Cuthbert's Church, Crayke, in North Yorkshire, and designed Holy Trinity Church, Bradford, in West Yorkshire, and St Thomas' Church, Stockton Heath, in Cheshire. He also restored one church in Wales, St Garmon in Capel Garmon.

== Key ==
| † | Denotes a new church designed by Paley, or one completely rebuilt. |
| Grade | Criteria |
| I | Buildings of exceptional interest, sometimes considered to be internationally important |
| II* | Particularly important buildings of more than special interest |
| II | Buildings of national importance and special interest |
| U | Not listed |

== Works ==
| Name | Location | Photograph | Date (Note: The dates given in this column are the years in which the work was carried out. Sources vary in the dates they provide; the dates used are those given in Brandwood et al.) | Notes | Grade |
|---|---|---|---|---|---|
| Capernwray Chapel | Over Kellet, Lancaster, Lancashire; 54.1440°N 2.7029°W | A stone chapel with a small tower surmounted by a pyramidal roof | 1856–57 | The chapel had been built for Capernwray Hall in 1840, and was designed by Sharpe. Paley added the southwest tower and the chancel. He also replaced the west window with a new one containing Geometric tracery. | II |
| Lancaster Priory | Lancaster, Lancashire; 54.0507°N 2.8057°W | A church with a west tower surmounted by battlements and pinnacles | 1856–58 | The priory had been established in 1094, and was extended and altered in the following centuries. Paley restored the chancel, removed the galleries, and added a new west organ gallery and a vestry. | I |
| Church of St Mary and St Michael † | Bonds, Lancashire; 53.8974°N 2.7710°W | A stone church with a west tower surmounted by battlements and a small spirelet | 1857–58 | This Roman Catholic church replaced a small chapel in the centre of Garstang. It consists of a nave and chancel under a continuous roof, a north aisle, a north porch, and a west tower. The tower has an embattled parapet. Attached to the tower is an octagonal stair turret with a small spirelet that rises to a greater height than the tower. The church provided seating for 600 people. | II |
| St Peter's Church (later Lancaster Cathedral) † | Lancaster, Lancashire; 54.04690°N 2.79335°W | A stone church dominated by a large, tall steeple | 1857–59 | Originally known as St Peter's Church, this originated as a Roman Catholic parish church that contained 600 seats. It consists of a five-bay nave with a clerestory, aisles and transepts, a two-bay chancel with aisles, side chapels, and a semi-octagonal apse. At the northeast is a steeple rising to a height of 240 feet (73 m). In 1860 Paley added a font. Considered to be Paley's finest work, the church became a cathedral in 1924. | II* |
| St George's Church † | Barrow-in-Furness, Cumbria; 54.1084°N 3.2209°W | The west end of a red sandstone church with two gables and a battlemented tower | 1859–60 | St George's Church is constructed in slate with sandstone dressings. Its main benefactors were the Duke of Buccleuch and the Duke of Devonshire. Paley added a north aisle in 1867, thereby increasing the seating to almost 1,000. The church consists of a five-bay nave with north and south aisles, south and west porches, a two-bay chancel with a chapel to the south, an organ chamber and a vestry to the north, and an embattled tower at the west end of the south aisle. | II |
| St Anne's Church † | Singleton, Lancashire; 53.8379°N 2.9360°W | A stone church from the south showing the transept and the braoch spire beyond | 1859–60 | The church was built for Thomas Miller of Singleton Hall to replace an earlier church that was demolished in 1859. It is in Early English style, and consists of a nave, a chancel, a south transept and a northeast tower with a broach spire. | II |
| Holy Trinity Church | Blackburn, Lancashire; 53.7511°N 2.4746°W | A large stone church from the south with a large transept and a west tower | 1860 | Holy Trinity was built in 1837–45 to a design by Sharpe. Paley reconstructed the galleries, adding 200 extra seats, introduced new stalls, and moved the organ to a new position behind the pulpit. | II |
| St Peter's Church † | Quernmore, Lancashire; 54.0366°N 2.7377°W | A small stone church from the north with a west tower and higher stair turret | 1860 | The church was built to replace a chapel of 1834. It was paid for by William Garnett of Quernmore Park, and cost about £3,000. The church is designed in the style of the 13th century, and consists of a three-bay nave, a north aisle, a north porch, a chancel, and a west tower. On the tower's northeast corner is an octagonal stair turret rising to a greater height. It was the first church designed by Paley to have a bare brick interior. | II |
| St Mary's Church | Knowsley, Merseyside; 53.4562°N 2.8528°W | A large stone church with a clerestory and west steeple | 1860 | St Mary's was built in 1843–44 to a design by Sharpe for the 13th Earl of Derby, mainly in Early English style. Paley added transepts with windows in Decorated style, a pulpit and a desk. | II |
| Holy Trinity Church | Casterton, Cumbria; 54.2115°N 2.5771°W | A low church from the southeast with a higher chancel and a small west tower | c. 1860 | The church was built in 1831–33 for Rev William Carus Wilson; the architect was probably George Webster. Paley replaced the chancel with a larger and more elaborate one in Early English style, containing lancet windows. | II |
| St Mary's Church † | Lowton, Golborne, Greater Manchester; 53.4763°N 2.5512°W | A small stone church with a west bellcote and a lower chancel and vestry | 1860–61 | St Mary's is a modest church without aisles that provided 345 seats at an estimated cost of £1,215. The west front contains a three-light window, framed by an arch carrying a double bellcote. | U |
| All Saints Church | Wigan, Greater Manchester; 53.5460°N 2.6328°W | An impressive stone church with a central pinnacled tower | 1861 | Between 1854 and 1850 the church had been largely rebuilt by Sharpe and Paley. In 1861 Paley added another stage to the tower, which included clock faces and pinnacles. | II* |
| All Saints Church † | Higher Walton, Lancashire; 53.7408°N 2.6407°W | A stone church with an apsidal chancel and a broach spire | 1861–62 | All Saints was designed in the style of about 1300. Its estimated cost was £4,300, and it provided seating for 604 people. The church consists of a nave and a chancel in one range, a south aisle with a porch, a north transept, and a chancel with a polygonal apse. At the west end is a tower with a stair turret and a broach spire. | II |
| St Paul's Church † | Hoddlesden, Lancashire; 53.7002°N 2.4341°W | — | 1861–62 | St Paul's is designed in Geometric style. It cost about £4,000 and seated 650 people. The church had a four-bay nave with a north aisle, a chancel, and a west tower with a stair turret rising to a greater height. It was demolished in 1975. | U |
| Rossall School Chapel † | Rossall, Fleetwood, Lancashire; 53.8957°N 3.0448°W | A stone chapel with a transept and an octagonal bell turret | 1861–62 | This is a chapel for Rossall School, built at an estimated cost of £4,400. It consists of a narrow nave, transepts, and a two-bay chancel. At the northwest is a slim bell turret with a short spire. The windows contain Geometric tracery. | II |
| St John the Evangelist's Church | Gressingham, Lancashire; 54.1233°N 2.6556°W | A plain stone church with a small west tower | 1862 | The church contains fabric from the 12th century, and was rebuilt in 1734. Paley's restoration included removing the porch, rebuilding the south wall, adding buttresses and windows, installing a new east window in Perpendicular style, inserting new windows in the clerestory, restoring the chancel arch, removing the ceiling, tiling the chancel, and reseating the church, all of which cost about £300. | I |
| St John the Baptist's Church † | Blawith, Cumbria; 54.2857°N 3.0940°W | A small stone church with a lower chancel and a double west bellcote | 1862–63 | This replaced an older church that is in ruins nearby. It cost £1,600 and contained about 170 seats. It consists of a nave and a short chancel, with lancet windows containing plate tracery. The church was declared redundant in 1988, and is in the care of the Churches Conservation Trust. | U |
| St Garmon's Church | Capel Garmon, Conwy County Borough, Wales; 53.0830°N 3.7698°W | A small church with a rendered nave and west single bellcote | 1862–63 | The church was restored at a cost of £800. The work included rebuilding the south wall, renewing the windows, adding a new porch and a north vestry, and reseating the church, increasing the seating from 145 to 150. The church has been closed. | U |
| Clark Street Congregational Church † | Morecambe, Lancashire; 54.0744°N 2.8618°W | Three-quarter view of a stone chapel with a gabled stone porch projecting from the near corner, a short tower at the far corner and a façade with two buttresses and a gable | 1862–63 | This originated as a Congregational chapel providing seating for 350 people. It has a truncated northwest tower, a southwest porch, and windows containing plate tracery. The chapel has been closed, and converted into offices. | U |
| St Mark's Church † | Preston, Lancashire; 53.7630°N 2.7190°W | A stone church from the southeast with a south transept and a pinnacled tower | 1862–63 | St Mark's cost £6,594. It is in Decorated style, and consists of a four-bay nave, north and south transepts, a chancel terminating in a three-sided apse, and a west porch (the tower was added later). The church was declared redundant in 1982, and has been converted into flats. | II* |
| Christ Church † | Ince-in-Makerfield, Greater Manchester; 53.5386°N 2.6115°W | A small stone church with a transept and an octagonal bell turret with a conical roof | 1862–64 | This church is in Decorated style. It consists of a five-bay nave, north and south transepts, a chancel ending in a polygonal apse, north and south vestries, and a porch at the west end. To the east of the north transept is a turret. | II |
| St Peter's Church | Heysham, Lancashire; 54.0474°N 2.9019°W | A broad stone church with three gables and a complex bellcote | 1863 | Most of the fabric of St Peter's dates from the 14th and 15th centuries. Paley restored the church and added a north aisle. In the course of these alterations an Anglo-Saxon doorway was dismantled and rebuilt in the churchyard, and two galleries were removed. | I |
| St Wilfrid's Church | Melling, Lancashire; 54.1347°N 2.6165°W | A plain stone church with a clerestory and a battlemented west tower | 1863 | The church dates mainly from the later part of the 15th century, with the clerestory added in 1763. Paley designed a new organ case. | I |
| St Cuthbert's Church | Over Kellet, Lancashire; 54.1195°N 2.7319°W | A rendered low church with a battlemented tower | 1863–64 | Although some of the fabric of the church dates from about 1200, most of it is from the 16th century. Paley's restoration included removing the ceiling, reinstating the chancel arch, and rebuilding the east end of the church, all at a cost of £330. The seating was increased by 35 to 295, retaining the older pews of 1816. | II* |
| St Mary's Church † | Allithwaite, Cumbria; 54.1830°N 2.9429°W | A small church with a lower chancel and an octagonal bell turret | 1863–65 | St Mary's was designed in Decorated style. At the same time Paley designed the associated parsonage and schools. The church consists of a nave and south aisle, a south porch, and a chancel with a north chapel. At the west end is an octagonal bell turret with a spire. | II |
| Holy Trinity Church † | Bury, Greater Manchester; 53.5890°N 2.2888°W | A small stone church with no visible tower or bellcote | 1863–65 | Paley designed this church in Decorated style. The site was donated by the 14th Earl of Derby, who also provided £1,000 towards its total cost of about £5,500. The planned south aisle and a north tower with a spire were never built. The church provided seating for 627 people. In 2010 it became redundant. | II |
| St Peter's Church † | Hindley, Greater Manchester; 53.5334°N 2.5812°W | The east part of a stone church having a tower with a broach spire | 1863–66 | This is a church in Decorated style providing seating for 689 people. It consists of a nave with a clerestory, north and south aisles, a chancel with a southwest vestry, and a northeast tower with a broach spire. | II |
| St James' Church † | Poolstock, Wigan, Greater Manchester; 53.5358°N 2.6379°W | A large stone church with a battlemented clerestory and a pinnacled tower | 1863–66 | This church was paid for by Nathaniel Eckersley of Standish Hall. It is in Decorated style and consists of a nave with a clerestory, north and south aisles, a chancel with a south chapel and north vestry, and a west tower. | II* |
| St Saviour's Church † | Aughton, Lancashire; 54.1025°N 2.6892°W | The east end of a stone which with a triple lancet window | 1864 | St Saviour's is a small church the cost £590 and provided seating for 100 people. It has lancet windows, and a bellcote at the west end. | U |
| St Cuthbert's Church | Crayke, North Yorkshire; 54.1287°N 1.1440°W | Part of a battlemented church and tower seen through an archway | 1864 | The church originated in the 15th century. Paley carried out a restoration and added the north aisle at a cost of £1,000. | II |
| St John the Evangelist's Church † | Turncroft, Over Darwen, Lancashire; 53.6899°N 2.4577°W | An engraving of a church with an apsidal chancel and a west steeple | 1864 | This church had a polygonal apse, and at the west end was a spire 146 feet (45 m) high. It has been demolished. | U |
| St Leonard's Church | Walton-le-Dale, Lancashire; 53.7476°N 2.6665°W | A stone church with a west battlemented tower | 1864 | The oldest part of the church, the chancel and the tower, date from the 16th century; the nave was built in 1795–98, and the transepts in 1816–17. The church had been restored in 1856. Paley carried out a further restoration, which included re-roofing, re-flooring and refitting the church, and adding a reredos in Bath stone. | II* |
| St Thomas' Church † | Blackburn, Lancashire | — | 1864–65 | This was a church in Decorated style. The first design in 1859 had been for a brick church, but the patrons insisted on stone. Building was then delayed because of concern over the impending cotton famine. When eventually built, it cost £4,469, and provided seating for 1,054 (originally planned for 766). It has since been demolished. | U |
| Holy Trinity Church † | Leeds Road, Bradford, West Yorkshire | — | 1864–65 | Holy Trinity was designed in Decorated style. It was built in stone with five bays, north and south aisles, and a tower at the southeast. The estimated cost was £3,565, with seating for 638 people. The church was demolished in 1966. | U |
| St Mary's Church | Penny Bridge, Egton, Cumbria; 54.2345°N 3.0593°W | — | 1864–65 | Built before 1786, the church was rebuilt in 1831, and the chancel was added in 1855–56. Paley rebuilt the nave and added the south aisle at a cost of £1,000, paid for by the Countess Blucher von Wahlstadt. | U |
| St John the Evangelist's Church † | Woodland, Cumbria; 54.2920°N 3.1580°W | The west part of a stone church with a bellcote | 1864–65 | This was the third church to be built on the site, replacing churches of 1698 and 1822. Like many others in the area it is small, consisting only of a nave and an apse, with a bellcote. It cost almost £1,000, and has 150 seats. | U |
| St Mary's Church | Ulverston, Cumbria; 54.1989°N 3.0915°W | The battlemented tower and west part of a stone church | 1864–66 | Other than the medieval tower with its Norman doorway, the church had been rebuilt in 1804. The tower was again retained, and Paley rebuilt the rest of the church, providing about 1,400 seats, and introducing Perpendicular tracery in the west window. | II* |
| St Matthew's Church † | Little Lever, Greater Manchester; 53.5628°N 2.3735°W | A stone church with a transept, a rose window and a pinnacled thower | 1865 | St Matthew's replaced a church of 1791 on a different site nearby. It is a wide church without aisles, but with transepts. Above the west porch is a large rose window. At this time the tower was only built up to the level of the eaves. Paley used a Transitional style of architecture in the design. | II |
| St Paul's Church | Brookhouse, Caton, Lancashire; 54.0753°N 2.7011°W | A stone church with a clerestory and a broad battlemented tower | 1865–67 | A church has been present on the site since before 1230. Paley rebuilt the church, other than its Perpendicular tower, again using the Perpendicular style. The work cost an estimated £4,000, and provided a church with aisles and a clerestory. Paley lived nearby and worshipped in this church. | II* |
| St Mary's Church | Kirkby Lonsdale, Cumbria; 54.2037°N 2.5975°W | The west end of a stone church with an embraced battlemented tower | 1866 | The earliest parts of the church are Norman, dating from the 11th or 12th century. The church was restored by Paley, at the expense of the Earl of Bective. The restoration included re-roofing and reseating the church, re-flooring the chancel, adding a south porch, and installing a screen and a font. | I |
| St Michael's Chapel † | Moor Hospital, Lancaster, Lancashire | — | 1866 | This originated as a chapel for Lancaster Moor Hospital. It is in Neo-Norman style, and has a cruciform plan. Since becoming redundant, it has been converted into flats. | II |
| Holy Trinity Church | Morecambe, Lancashire; 54.0746°N 2.8575°W | Side view of a long stone-built church set in a churchyard behind a low wall, with a tower to the left. | 1866 | Holy Trinity had been rebuilt in 1840–41 by Edmund Sharpe, replacing an earlier chapel. Paley added a south aisle with seven Decorated windows, each with a gable rising higher than the parapet. | II |
| St Helen's Church | Churchtown, Lancashire; 53.8788°N 2.7900°W | A long church with a clerestory, battlemented tower, and a stair turret with a small spire | 1866–69 | The church dates from the 13th century, and was rebuilt in the 15th and 16th centuries. Paley restored the church at a cost of £1,372; the work included removal of the west gallery and reseating the church. | I |
| Cartmel Priory | Cartmel, Cumbria; 54.2011°N 2.9523°W | A complex stone church with a large west window and a central tower | 1867 | Founded by the Augustinian order in about 1190, the priory church was completed by 1233. Alterations and additions were made during the following centuries. Paley carried out a restoration, which included reseating the church, stripping the plaster from the walls, removing the galleries, adding an organ, a font, a pulpit and reading desk, and re-glazing the windows. | I |
| St Thomas' Church † | Stockton Heath, Warrington, Cheshire; 53.3723°N 2.5824°W | A stone church from the southeast with a northwest tower and stair turret | 1867–68 | This church replaced an earlier one; its main benefactor was Sir Gilbert Greenall. Its estimated cost was £5,395, to provide seating for 650 people. This large church is constructed in red sandstone, and is in Decorated style, with a west tower and a southeast turret. It consists of a nave, a south aisle, a chancel, a north transept and a north vestry and organ loft. | II |
| St James' Church † | Barrow-in-Furness, Cumbria; 54.1190°N 3.2337°W | A red brick church with stone dressings, having a clerestory and a steeple | 1867–69 | Sited in an elevated position, the church is built mainly in red brick, with blue brick decoration, and with dressings and a spire in yellow stone. The steeple is placed on the south side of the chancel, which has a polygonal east end. There is also a six-bay nave with a clerestory and aisles. The church cost about £7,650, and provided 950 seats. It was considered by Nikolaus Pevsner to be "the best church in Barrow". | II* |
| St Peter's Church † | Churchgate, Bolton, Greater Manchester; 53.5794°N 2.4237°W | A stone church seen from the west, with a tall pinnacled tower | 1867–71 | St Peter's replaced the medieval parish church of Bolton. It was paid for by Peter Ormrod, a local cotton manufacturer, and eventually cost £45,000. It consists of a nave with a clerestory, aisles, transepts, a chancel with north and south chapels, and a northwest tower. The tower, at 180 feet (55 m), is the highest in the historic county of Lancashire. | II* |
| All Saints Church † | Lupton, Cumbria; 54.2218°N 2.6649°W | A small church with an apse and a bellcote | 1867 (or 1868) | The church is very small, consisting of a three-bay nave with an apse, a north vestry, and a south porch. It is in Neo-Norman style, with a large south doorway. On the west gable is a bellcote. | II |

== Notes and references ==
Notes

Citations

Sources

- Brandwood, Geoff; Austin, Tim; Hughes, John; Price, James (2012), The Architecture of Sharpe, Paley and Austin, Swindon: English Heritage, ISBN 978-1-84802-049-8
- Dixon, Roger; Muthesius, Stefan (1985) [1978], Victorian Architecture (Second ed.), London: Thames and Hudson, ISBN 978-0-500-20160-2
- Hartwell, Clare; Hyde, Matthew; Pevsner, Nikolaus (2004), Lancashire: Manchester and the South-East, The Buildings of England, New Haven and London: Yale University Press, ISBN 0-300-10583-5
- Hartwell, Clare; Pevsner, Nikolaus (2009) [1969], Lancashire: North, The Buildings of England, New Haven and London: Yale University Press, ISBN 978-0-300-12667-9
- Hubbard, Edward (1986), Clwyd, The Buildings of Wales, London: Penguin, ISBN 0-14-071052-3
- Hyde, Matthew; Pevsner, Nikolaus (2010) [1967], Cumbria, The Buildings of England, New Haven and London: Yale University Press, ISBN 978-0-300-12663-1
- Pevsner, Nikolaus (2002) [1969], North Lancashire, The Buildings of England, New Haven and London: Yale University Press, ISBN 0-300-09617-8
- Price, James (1998), Sharpe, Paley and Austin: A Lancaster Architectural Practice 1836–1942, Lancaster: Centre for North-West Regional Studies, ISBN 1-86220-054-8
- Pollard, Richard; Pevsner, Nikolaus (2006), Lancashire: Liverpool and the South-West, The Buildings of England, New Haven and London: Yale University Press, ISBN 0-300-10910-5
