= St Helen's Church, Churchtown =

Coordinates: 53.8788°N 2.7900°W

St Helen's, Churchtown
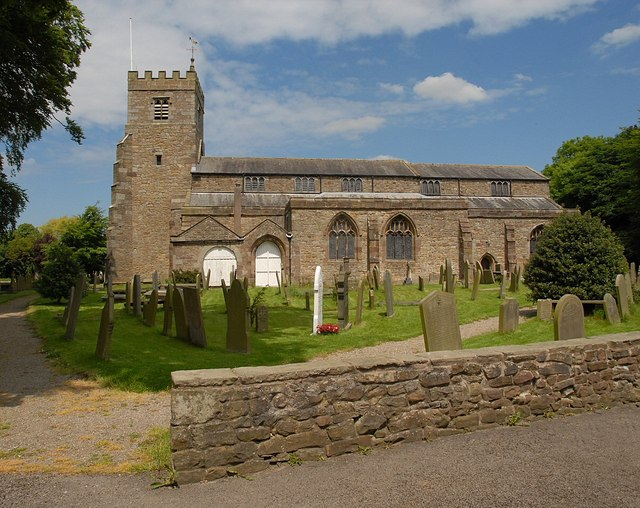
- St. Helen's Church in 2009

- Location in the Borough of Wyre
- Location: Churchtown, Lancashire
- Denomination: Anglican
- Website: sthelens-stmichaels.org.uk

History
- Dedication: St Helen

Architecture
- Functional status: Active
- Heritage designation: Grade I
- Designated: 17 April 1967

Specifications
- Height: 62 feet (19 m)

Administration
- Province: York
- Diocese: Blackburn
- Archdeaconry: Blackburn
- Deanery: Garstang
- Parish: Garstang St Helen

Clergy
- Vicar: Rev Andrew Wilkinson

St Helen's Church is an Anglican church in the village of Churchtown in Lancashire, England. Historically, it was the parish church of Garstang; today, as Garstang is split into more than one ecclesiastical parish, St Helen's parish is Garstang St Helen (Churchtown). It is in the Diocese of Blackburn. It has been designated a Grade I listed building by English Heritage. St Helen's is known as the "cathedral of The Fylde".

== History ==
St Helen's is situated close to the banks of the River Wyre. Historically, the village of Churchtown (once known as Kirkland) was part of the ecclesiastical parish of Garstang, with St Helen's as the parish church. The oldest parts of the church date from the 13th century, these are the piers and responds in the chancel, and the arch piers in the nave. The church was rebuilt in the 15th and 16th centuries. In 1736, an overflow of the River Wyre flooded the churchyard and damaged the church, necessitating its restoration. In 1811 the roofs were replaced, the walls were raised and a clerestory added. Further restoration work took place in 1866–1869 by E. G. Paley at a cost of £1,372 (equivalent to £140,000 in 2025).

== Assessment and administration ==
It was designated a Grade I listed building by English Heritage on 17 April 1967. The Grade I designation—the highest of the three grades—is for buildings "of exceptional interest, sometimes considered to be internationally important".

An active church in the Church of England, St Helen's is part of the Diocese of Blackburn, which is in the Province of York. It is in the archdeaconry of Blackburn and the Deanery of Garstang. In shares a benefice with St Michael's Church in St Michael's on Wyre. The official name of the parish is Garstang St Helen (Churchtown). St Helen's is known as the "cathedral of The Fylde".

== Architecture ==
=== Exterior ===
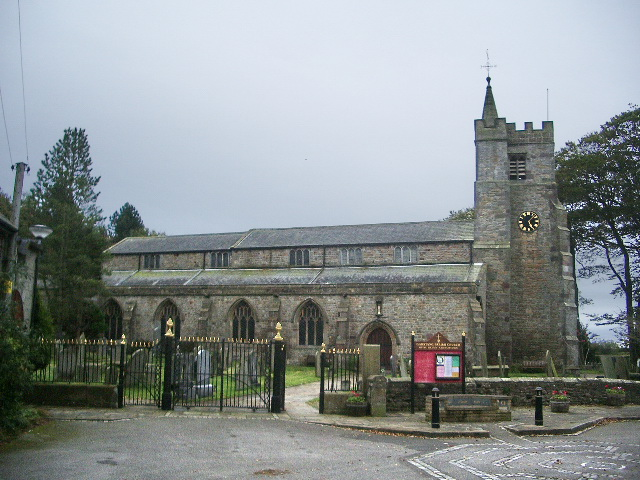
St Helen's from the north west

St Helen's is constructed in the Perpendicular style of rubble with ashlar dressings. Its plan consists of a clerestoried nave with aisles to the north and south, a chapel and porch to the south, a tower to the west, and a chancel, which has north and south aisles and a north vestry. The roofs are low-pitched. The chapel and aisles have a plain ashlar parapet.

The west tower has six stages. It has angled buttresses on the west side and a crenellated parapet. There is a turret on its north-east corner, which has a spire. The belfry louvres have trefoiled two-light openings with square heads. There is also a small, square window at the level of the bell-ringing chamber. The north wall of the tower has a clock.

=== Interior and fittings ===
Internally, the tower measures 11 feet (3.4 m) square. It is entered from the nave through an arch of two hollow chamfered orders. The nave measures 55 feet 6 inches (16.92 m) by 21 feet 9 inches (6.63 m). It is separated from the north and south aisles by five-bay arcades, with pointed arches and round piers. There is a recumbent effigy in the nave to Alexander Butler (d. 1726). The Lady chapel south of the south aisle, endowed by Lady Rigmayden of Wedacre in 1529, is accessed through two pointed arches. It was founded by Margaret Rigmaiden (d. 1516) of Wedacre. The chapel contains a piscina (basin), which has a cusped head. On the wall there is an inscription in Latin warning of "idle chatter in church".

The chancel measures 36 feet 9 inches (11.20 m) by 19 feet 3 inches (5.87 m). The pointed chancel arch separating the chancel from the nave is in the Decorated style; it has two orders with wave moulding. The vestry at the north-east corner of the building is mostly constructed of dressed stone, which contrasts with the rubble of the rest of the church.

The stained glass in the church dates mostly from the 19th century. It includes work by Ward and Hughes, William Wailes and Heaton, Butler and Bayne. The tower houses a ring of six bells hung in a wooden frame, that are rung from the ground floor. They were cast in 1828 by Thomas Mears at the Whitechapel Bell Foundry in London.

== Churchyard ==
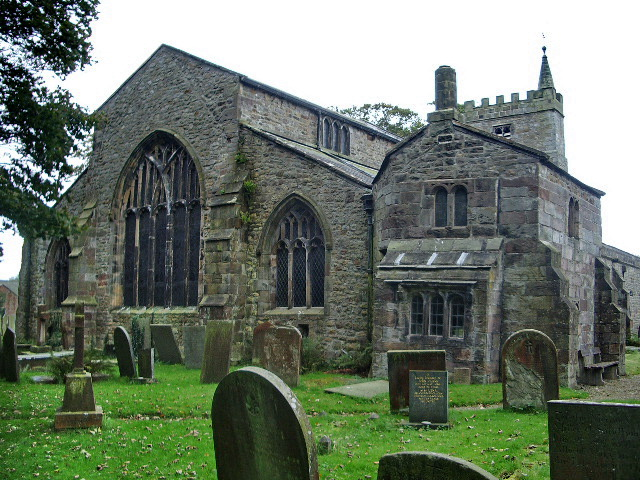
The east end of the church, showing the vestry (1570)

The churchyard is mostly to the north and south sides of the church. It contains several sandstone headstones that have received a Grade II designation from English Heritage. They date mostly from the 18th century. (Note: For details of the English Heritage listings for the churchyard's headstones, see) There is a sundial that dates from 1757. South of the church there is the chamfered shaft of a sandstone cross, probably dating from the Middle Ages. North-east of the church is a stone cross. The base is from the Middle Ages, but the shaft and octagonal steps were replaced in the 1930s. The whole cross and the incomplete cross shaft have also been given Grade II listings.

== See also ==
- Listed buildings in Kirkland, Lancashire
- Grade I listed buildings in Lancashire
- Grade I listed churches in Lancashire
- List of ecclesiastical works by E. G. Paley
