= St Michael's Chapel, Lancaster Moor Hospital =

Church in Lancashire, England

Coordinates: 54.0482°N 2.7764°W

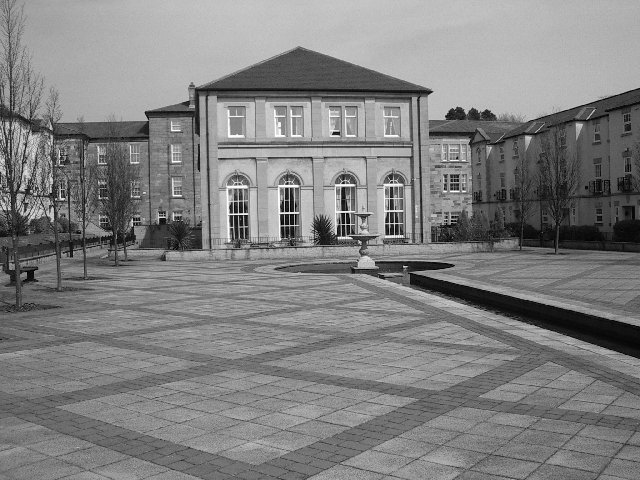

St Michael's Chapel is the former Anglican chapel to Lancaster Moor Hospital, to the east of Lancaster, Lancashire, England. It was built in 1866 to a design by the local architect E. G. Paley. Its architectural style is Neo-Norman. The chapel is constructed in sandstone with ashlar dressings and a slate roof. Its plan is cruciform, consisting of a nave with a west porch, north and south transepts, and a chancel with an apsidal east end. The windows are round-headed with voussoirs of alternating red and yellow sandstone. Both transepts contain a rose window above two single-light windows. Since becoming redundant the chapel has been converted into flats. The former chapel is recorded in the National Heritage List for England as a designated Grade II listed building.

== See also ==
- Listed buildings in Lancaster, Lancashire
- List of ecclesiastical works by E. G. Paley
