= St Thomas' Church, Blackburn =

Church in Lancashire, England

Coordinates: 53.7475°N 2.4645°W

St Thomas' Church was an Anglican parish church in Blackburn, Lancashire, England. The church was situated on the eastern side of Lambeth Street, between Billinge Street and Skiddaw Street. It was designed by the Lancaster architect E. G. Paley. The first plan had been prepared in 1859, but the church was not built until 1864–65. The first design was in brick, but the patron insisted on its being in stone. Originally the plan had been to seat 766 people, but this was later increased to 1,054. The church cost £4,469 (equivalent to £560,000 in 2023). The church closed in 1977 and has since been demolished.

== See also ==
- List of ecclesiastical works by E. G. Paley
