= Clark Street Congregational Church, Morecambe =

Clark Street Congregational Church
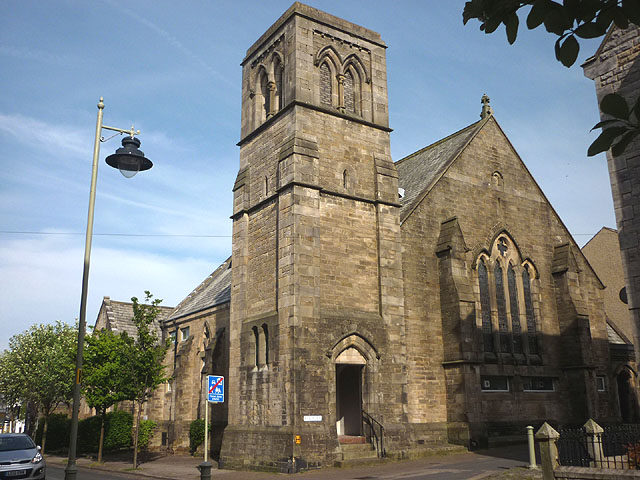

- Location in Morecambe
- 54.0743°N 2.8619°W
- OS grid reference: SD 43700 64605
- Location: Morecambe, Lancashire
- Country: England
- Denomination: Congregational

History
- Status: Church

Architecture
- Functional status: Closed
- Architect: E. G. Paley
- Years built: 1863
- Closed: before 1980

Specifications
- Capacity: 350

Clark Street Congregational Church, in Morecambe, Lancashire, England, was built in 1863 and designed by the Lancaster architect E. G. Paley. It provided seating for 350 people. The chapel has a northwest tower, a southwest porch, and windows containing plate tracery. The church closed before 1980, and has been converted into offices.

== See also ==
- List of ecclesiastical works by E. G. Paley
