= All Saints Church, Lupton =

Coordinates: 54.2218°N 2.6649°W

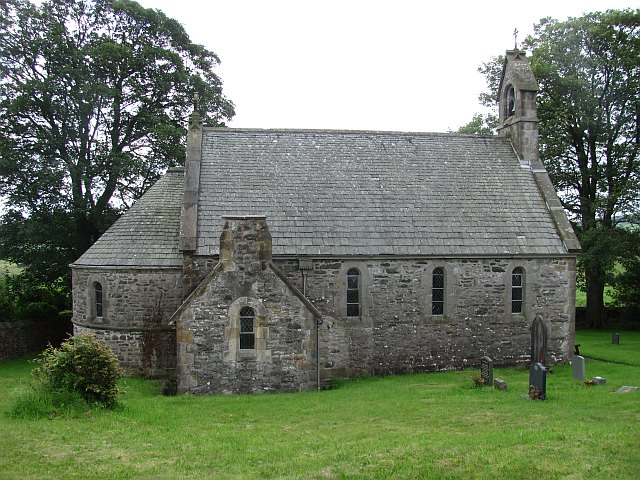
- All Saints Church, Lupton, from the north

- Location in Cumbria
- OS grid reference: SD 567 809
- Location: Lupton, Cumbria
- Country: England
- Denomination: Anglican
- Website: All Saints, Lupton

History
- Status: Parish church

Architecture
- Functional status: Active
- Heritage designation: Grade II
- Designated: 21 February 1989
- Architect: E. G. Paley
- Architectural type: Church
- Style: Neo-Norman
- Completed: 1867 (or 1868)

Specifications
- Materials: Stone, slate roof

Administration
- Province: York
- Diocese: Carlisle
- Archdeaconry: Westmorland and Furness
- Deanery: Kendal
- Parish: Kirkby Lonsdale

All Saints Church is in the village of Lupton, Cumbria, England. It is an active Anglican parish church in the deanery of Kendal, the archdeaconry of Westmorland and Furness, and the diocese of Carlisle. Its benefice is united with those of seven local parishes, the benefice being entitled Kirkby Lonsdale Team Ministry, and known locally as the Rainbow Parish. The church is recorded in the National Heritage List for England as a designated Grade II listed building.

== History ==
The church was built in 1867 (or 1868) and designed by the Lancaster architect E. G. Paley.

== Architecture ==
All Saints is constructed in stone rubble with ashlar dressings, and has a slate roof. It is a small church in Neo-Norman style. Its plan consists of a three-bay nave, an apsidal chancel, a north vestry, and a south porch. The windows are round-headed. At the west end of the church is a bellcote. On the gable at the east end of the nave is a cross finial. The interior of the church is painted blue. The font, which was moved here from St. Mary Kirkby Lonsdale, is dated 1686. Also in the church are painted commandment boards.

== See also ==
- Listed buildings in Lupton, Cumbria
- List of ecclesiastical works by E. G. Paley
