= St Thomas' Church, Stockton Heath =

Coordinates: 53.3723°N 2.5825°W

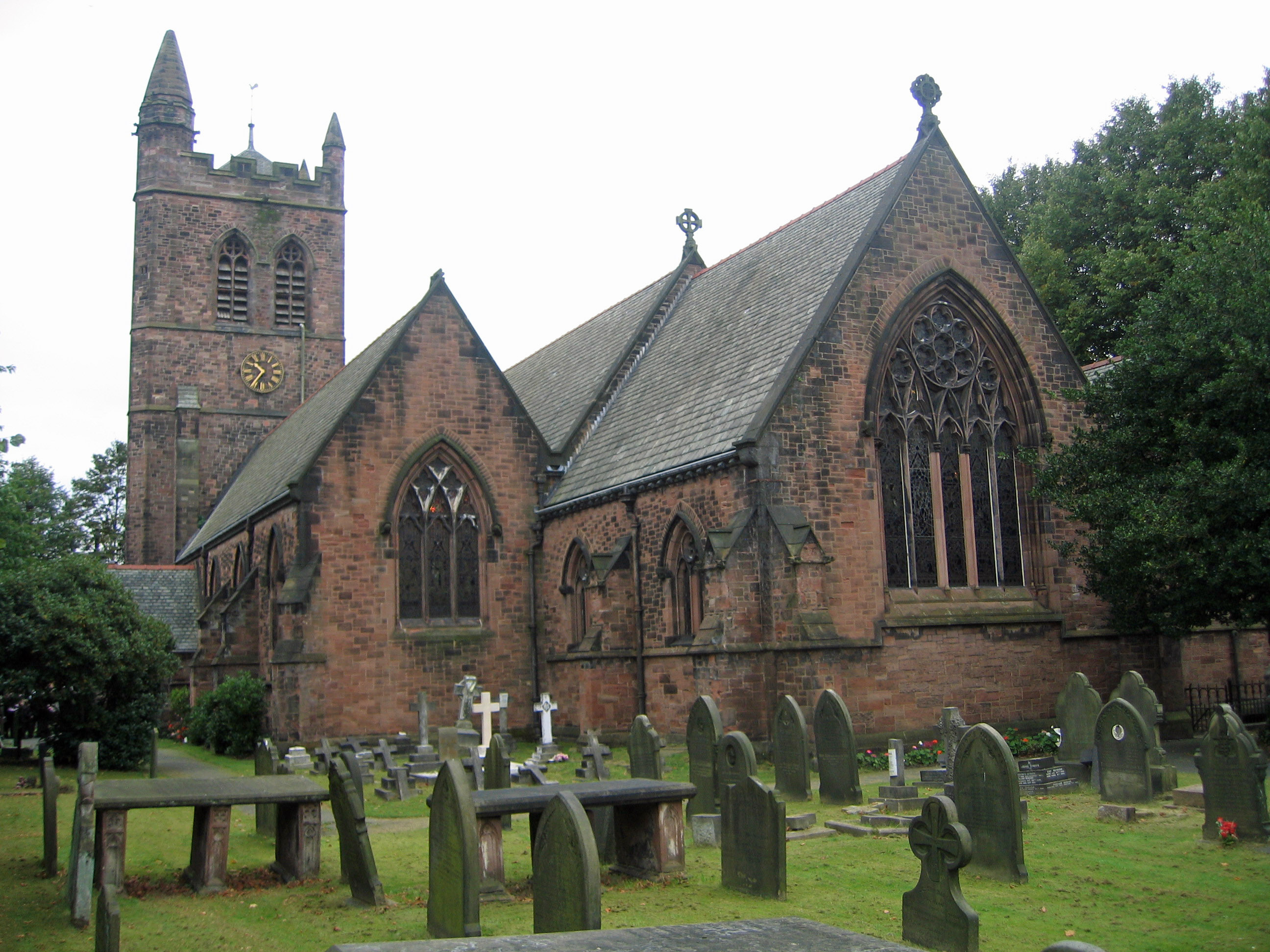
- St Thomas' Church, Stockton Heath, from the southeast

- Location in Cheshire
- OS grid reference: SJ 614 864
- Location: Stockton Heath, Warrington, Cheshire
- Country: England
- Denomination: Anglican
- Website: St Thomas' and St Mary Magdalene's

History
- Status: Parish church
- Dedication: St Thomas

Architecture
- Functional status: Active
- Heritage designation: Grade II
- Designated: 23 December 1983
- Architect: E. G. Paley
- Architectural type: Church
- Style: Gothic Revival
- Completed: 1868

Specifications
- Materials: Sandstone, Westmorland slate roofs

Administration
- Province: York
- Diocese: Chester
- Archdeaconry: Chester
- Deanery: Great Budworth
- Parish: St Thomas, Stockton Heath

Clergy
- Vicar: Rev Michael Ridley

St Thomas' Church is in Stockton Heath, to the south of Warrington, Cheshire, England. The church is recorded in the National Heritage List for England as a designated Grade II listed building, and is an active Anglican parish church in the diocese of Chester, the archdeaconry of Chester and the deanery of Great Budworth.

== History ==
The present church was built in 1868 on the site of a former church that had been erected in 1838. It was designed by the Lancaster architect E. G. Paley, the main benefactor being Sir Gilbert Greenall. The tower was added later although a full set of bells were not installed until 2016. The current ring of 10 bells consists of 8 bells donated from St. John the Baptist, Bollington supplemented with two new trebles cast by John Taylor & Co. A campaign to keep a tolling bell dating from 1883 dedicated to the wife of John Crosfield (son of Joseph Crosfield) took place in an attempt to retain the bell locally.

== Architecture ==
It is constructed in pinkish-red sandstone with Westmorland slate roofs. Its plan consists of a four-bay nave with a south aisle under a parallel ridged roof, a south porch, a north transept, a north vestry, a two-bay chancel and a west tower. The tower is in four stages with an octagonal southeast turret and an embattled parapet.

The chancel is decorated with richly coloured patterned tilework and the reredos is of marble and embossed patterned tiles. The organ was built around 1880 by Young and Sons and rebuilt in 1963 by Rushworth and Dreaper of Liverpool.

== External features ==
The churchyard contains the war graves of 31 service personnel, 17 from World War I and 14 from World War II.

== See also ==
- List of ecclesiastical works by E. G. Paley
