= Listed buildings in Kirkland, Lancashire =

Kirkland is a civil parish in the Wyre district of Lancashire, England. It contains 26 buildings that are recorded in the National Heritage List for England as designated listed buildings. Of these, one is listed at Grade I, the highest of the three grades, one is at Grade II*, the middle grade, and the others are at Grade II, the lowest grade. The parish contains the village of Churchtown and the surrounding countryside. The most important building in the parish is St Helen's Church, which is listed together with a number of structures in or near the churchyard. The other listed buildings include houses and cottages, a village cross, milestones, and a telephone kiosk.

== Key ==
Grade	Criteria
I	Buildings of exceptional interest, sometimes considered to be internationally important
II*	Particularly important buildings of more than special interest
II	Buildings of national importance and special interest

== Buildings ==
Name and location	Photograph	Date	Notes	Grade
Cross; 53.87906°N 2.78957°W	—	Medieval	The cross is in the churchyard of St Helen's Church. It is in stone and the oldest part is the base, which has a rectangular plan and chamfered upper edges. The steps and upper parts date from 1930. The base stands on three octagonal steps, and on it is a rectangular shaft with a cross head. On the upper step is a Latin inscription.	II
Cross shaft 53.87863°N 2.78996°W	—	Medieval (probable)	The cross shaft is in the churchyard of St Helen's Church. It is in sandstone and has a rectangular plan with chamfered sides. The upper part is broken off.	II
Two headstones (east wall of vestry); 53.87888°N 2.78968°W	—	Medieval	The two sandstone headstones are against the east wall of the vestry of St Helen's Church. The older one is part of a grave cover, it is carved with a circular cross head and has an inscription. The other dates from the 18th century, and also has an inscription.	II
St Helen's Church; 53.87879°N 2.79005°W		15th century	Some of the fabric dates back to about 1220 and some to about 1300. The church was altered in the 16th century, the clerestory and roof were added in 1881, and the church was restored in 1865–68. It consists of a west tower, a nave and chancel, both with a clerestory, aisles, a northeast vestry, a south porch, and a hearse house on the south side. The tower has stepped angle buttresses, a stair turret with a spirelet, and an embattled parapet. Most of the windows contain Perpendicular tracery. Inside the church, some of the choir stall have misericords.	I
Churchgate House; 53.87940°N 2.79018°W	—	1698	The house is in pebbledashed brick with a slate roof in two storeys with an attic. It has an L-shaped plan with a main range of five bays and a rear wing. The windows on the front are sashes, and at the rear is a mullioned and transomed stair window. The porch has two columns and pilaster responds.	II
Group of six headstones 53.87868°N 2.78992°W	—	1701	The headstones are in sandstone, and are against the south wall of the south chapel of St Helen's Church. They are inscribed with initials and with dates between 1701 and 1758.	II
Headstone (east wall of south chapel); 53.87870°N 2.78988°W	—	1716	The headstone is in sandstone, and is against the east wall of the south chapel of St Helen's Church. Inscribed on it are initials and the date.	II
Headstone (north of vestry); 53.87911°N 2.78983°W	—	1719	The headstone is in the churchyard of St Helen's Church. It is in sandstone, and is inscribed with initials and the date.	II
Group of eight headstones 53.87902°N 2.79001°W	—	1724	The headstones are in the churchyard of St Helen's Church. They are in sandstone, and are inscribed with initials and with dates between 1724 and 1755.	II
Headstone (northeast of vestry); 53.87896°N 2.78969°W	—	Early 18th century	The headstone is in the churchyard of St Helen's Church. It is in sandstone, and is inscribed with a name and part of the date (the year being illegible).	II
Headstone (north of church); 53.87896°N 2.78993°W	—	1727–28	The headstone is in the churchyard of St Helen's Church. It is in sandstone, and is inscribed with initials and dates.	II
Headstone (northeast of vestry); 53.87897°N 2.78954°W	—	1728	The headstone is in the churchyard of St Helen's Church. It is in sandstone, and is inscribed with initials and the date.	II
Headstone (east of vestry); 53.87888°N 2.78938°W	—	1746	The headstone is in the churchyard of St Helen's Church. It is in sandstone, and is inscribed with a name and the date.	II
Barn, Old Vicarage; 53.87938°N 2.78893°W	—	1755	The barn is in brick and sandstone, and has a tile roof. The south wall has a canopy, ventilation slits in diamond patterns, and two doorways with stone lintels. In the east gable wall is a doorway and a pitching hole, and between them is an oval inscribed plaque.	II
Sundial; 53.87862°N 2.79002°W	—	1757	The sundial is in the churchyard of St Helen's Church. It is in sandstone, and consists of a baluster column on two circular steps. The plate and gnomon are missing.	II
Kirkland Hall; 53.88562°N 2.79225°W	—	1760	A country house that contains earlier fabric, including timber-framing, and to which rear wings were added in the 19th century. It is in brick with sandstone dressings and a slate roof. There are two storeys with and attic and a symmetrical front of seven bays, with quoins and a cornice. The middle three bays project forward under a pediment, and the doorway has a Tuscan porch on four steps with pilasters. The windows are sashes.	II*
Village cross 53.88025°N 2.79045°W		Late 18th century	The cross is in sandstone and stands on two square steps. It consists of a Tuscan column on a pedestal, surmounted by a square block with a sundial on the southern face, and with a ball finial.	II
Old Vicarage; 53.87913°N 2.78863°W	—	c. 1800	Originally a vicarage, the house is in brick with sandstone dressings and a slate roof. It has two storeys and a symmetrical front of five bays, with a band, a cornice, and a blocking course. The side walls have four bays, and the windows are sashes with stone sills and lintels. The porch is semicircular, approached by six steps, with Composite columns, two separate, and two engaged. The door has a fanlight with an elliptical head. At the rear is a stair window in Venetian style.	II
Coach house 53.87913°N 2.78998°W	—	Early 19th century	The building is adjacent to the churchyard wall of St Helen's Church. It is in sandstone with a slate roof, and has a narrow front containing a round-arched entrance with a keystone and a small horizontal opening above.	II
Manor House and Manor Cottage; 53.88022°N 2.79061°W	—	Early 19th century	A pair of brick houses with sandstone window sills and a slate roof, in two storeys. Manor House, to the left, has two bays, and Manor Cottage has one. The windows have brick reveals and heads, and there is a modern porch in front of Manor House.	II
Pair of cottages 53.87992°N 2.79065°W	—	Early 19th century	The cottages are in brick with a slate roof and are in two storeys. Each cottage has two bays and a central doorway. Most of the windows are sliding sashes; one window is fixed.	II
Sunday School; 53.87834°N 2.78996°W	—	Early to mid 19th century	The Sunday school is in brick with sandstone dressings and a slate roof, and is in one storey. There is a gabled porch, with one bay on each side. The windows have pointed heads and contain mullions, and the doorway also has a pointed head.	II
Churchgate Cottage; 53.87932°N 2.79013°W	—	Mid 19th century	A stone house with a slate roof in two storeys and two bays. The windows are sashes with plain surrounds.	II
Milestone; 53.88535°N 2.78020°W	—	19th century	The milestone on the A6 road is in sandstone, and has a triangular plan with a sloping top. The top is inscribed "KIRKLAND" and the other faces indicate the distances in miles to Garstang and Lancaster on one side, and to Great Eccleston, Poulton-le-Fylde, and Blackpool on the other.	II
Milestone; 53.88080°N 2.79606°W	—	19th century	The milestone on the A586 road is in sandstone, and has a triangular plan with a sloping top. The top is inscribed "KIRKLAND" and the other faces indicate the distances in miles to Garstang and Lancaster on one side, and to Great Eccleston, Poulton-le-Fylde, and Blackpool on the other.	II
Telephone kiosk 53.88040°N 2.79053°W	—	1935	A K6 type telephone kiosk, designed by Giles Gilbert Scott. Constructed in cast iron with a square plan and a dome, it has three unperforated crowns in the top panels.	II
