= Holy Trinity Church, Bradford =

Church in Bradford, West Yorkshire, England

Coordinates: 53.79253°N 1.73348°W

Holy Trinity Church, Bradford, was an Anglican parish church located in Leeds Road, Bradford, West Yorkshire, England. It was built in 1864–65 to a design by the Lancaster architect E. G. Paley at an estimated cost of £3,565 (equivalent to £430,000 in 2023). The church was constructed in stone, its architectural style being Decorated. It had north and south five-bay aisles, and a southeast tower. In 1871 a broach spire was added, the chancel arch was rebuilt, and the tower was underpinned because of subsidence, the architects being Paley and Austin.

The church was demolished in 1966, and the parish merged with that of St Clement's.

== See also ==
- List of ecclesiastical works by E. G. Paley
- List of ecclesiastical works by Paley and Austin
- St. George's Episcopal Memorial Church, a church in the US with a stained glass window containing shards of glass collected from this church when it was damaged in World War II.
