= Mains Hall =

Building in Singleton, Lancashire, England

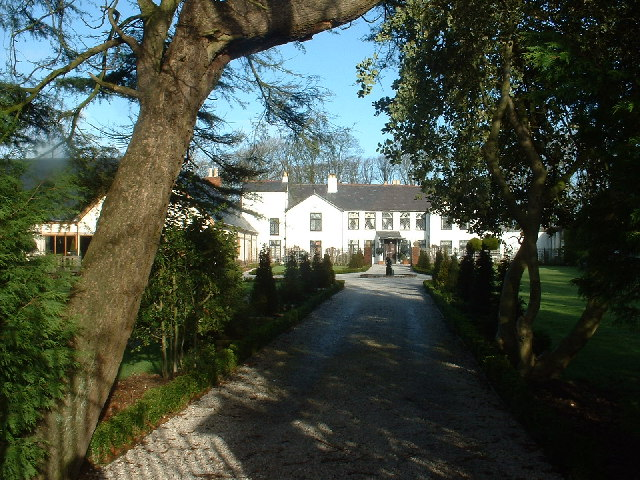
- The building in 2006

- Location within the Borough of Wyre Location within Lancashire
- 53.856988°N 2.959053°W
- Location: Mains Lane, Singleton, Lancashire, England

History
- Built: c. 1536 (490 years ago)

Site notes
- Area: Borough of Wyre

Listed Building – Grade II
- Designated: 9 June 1967
- Reference no.: 1071996

Mains Hall (also known as Mains Hall Manor) is a historic building on Mains Lane in Singleton, Lancashire, England. It is Grade II listed, dating to the 16th century. A manor house, from the 11th century, is believed to have once stood on the site.

Today's manor house was remodelled in the 17th century and altered again in the 18th century and beyond. It is now a hotel.

It is in rendered brick with a slate roof, and has an irregular plan. The building has two storeys, and a hall range with projecting gabled bays, a large extension to the rear, and other additions. Most of the windows have been altered but there is one two-light mullioned window, and inside are the remains of some of the original timberwork.

George IV is believed to have visited the manor in the early 19th century, while Cardinal Allen hid there to evade the Protestant authorities during the Reformation. The monks of Cockersand Abbey were granted right of passage at the manor.

The manor was home to the Hesketh family for around 300 years; it was also the home of the Fitzherberts.

Roger and Adele Yeomans purchased the property in 1989, when it was a bed and breakfast. A fire in 2002 revealed that the manor's walls were still the original wattle and daub construction. During restoration work, the Yeomans also discovered a secret chapel.

Mains Hall in the 19th century or earlier

An 18th-century octagonal dovecote, constructed of handmade brick, stands around 150 metres (490 ft) north of the manor. It is also Grade II listed.

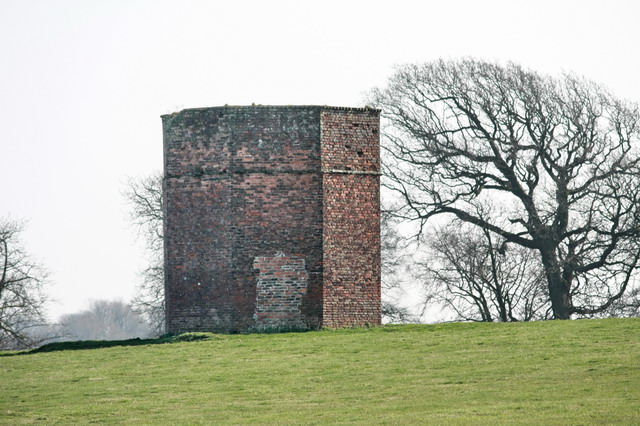
Mains Hall dovecote, pictured in 2009

== See also ==
- Listed buildings in Singleton, Lancashire
