= Listed buildings in Singleton, Lancashire =

Singleton is a civil parish in the Borough of Fylde, Lancashire, England. It contains six buildings that are recorded in the National Heritage List for England as designated listed buildings, all of which are listed at Grade II. This grade is the lowest of the three gradings given to listed buildings and is applied to "buildings of national importance and special interest". The parish contains the village of Singleton, but is otherwise mainly rural. The listed buildings consist of large houses and a church, structures associated with them, and the former house for a fire engine.

== Buildings ==
Name and location	Photograph	Date	Notes
Mains Hall; 53.85695°N 2.95906°W		Late 16th century (possible)	A manor house that was later altered and expanded, and then used as a hotel. It is in rendered brick with a slate roof, and has an irregular plan. The building has two storeys, and a hall range with projecting gabled bays, a large extension to the rear, and other additions. Most of the windows have been altered but there is one two-light mullioned window, and inside are the remains of some of the original timberwork.
Dovecote, Mains Hall; 53.85760°N 2.95750°W		18th century	The dovecote is in hand-made brick, and has no roof. It is in an octagonal plan, and has a doorway. Inside are nest holes, perching ledges, and a possible former fireplace. It faces the River Wyre.
St Anne's Church; 53.83792°N 2.93597°W		1859–60	The church was designed by E. G. Paley in Early English style. It is built in sandstone with a slate roof, and consists of a nave, a south transept, a chancel, and a northeast steeple. The steeple has a three-stage tower with angle buttresses, and a broach spire with lucarnes. Towards the east end of the nave are four-light dormer windows.
Fire engine house 53.83667°N 2.94043°W		Late 19th century	The former house for a fire engine is timber-framed on a brick plinth, and has a red tiled roof. The panels contain pargeted plaster, the gables have pierced bargeboards, and on the roof is louvred bellcote with a pyramidal roof. On the lintel above the double doors is an inscribed plaque.
Ice house, Singleton Hall; 53.84488°N 2.94458°W	—	1870s	The ice house in the grounds of the hall is built in red brick and is covered by an earth mound. Steps lead down to a doorway that leads into an entrance passage. The chamber is circular, lined with brick, and has a cast iron grid to a drain.
Lych gate, St Anne's Church; 53.83814°N 2.93644°W		1879	The lych gate is at the entrance to the churchyard. It is open timber-framed with a hipped and swept roof of red tiles, and stands on a stone base.
