= St John the Evangelist's Church, Turncroft =

Former church in Darwen, Lancashire, England

Coordinates: 53.68986°N 2.45774°W

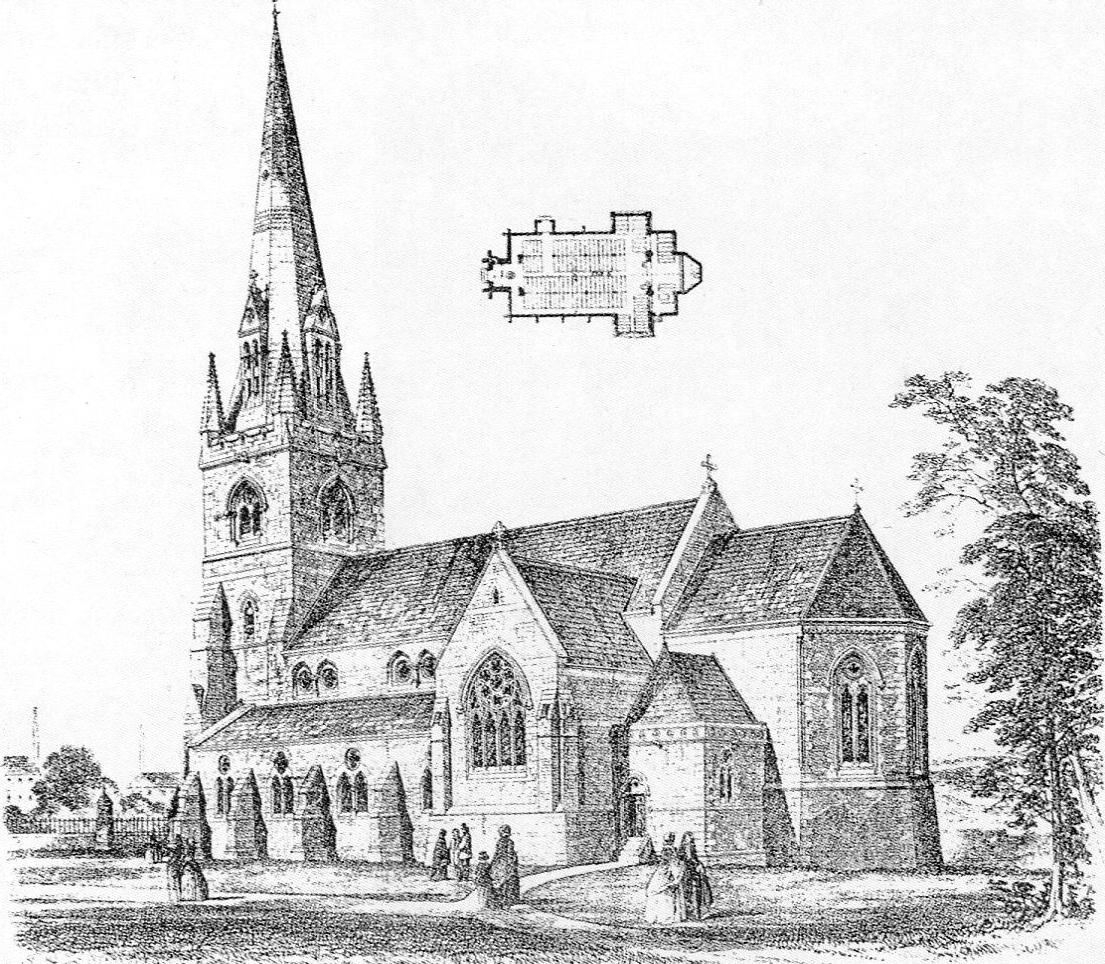
Drawing of the church from 1895

St John the Evangelist's Church was an Anglican parish church in Turncroft, Over Darwen, Lancashire, England. It was paid for by a Mrs Graham, and designed by the Lancaster architect E. G. Paley. The church cost £8,000 (equivalent to £840,000 in 2023). It had a spire 146 feet 6 inches (45 m) high. The church has since been closed and demolished.

== See also ==
- List of ecclesiastical works by E. G. Paley
