= St Mary's Church, Lowton =

Coordinates: 53.4763°N 2.5512°W

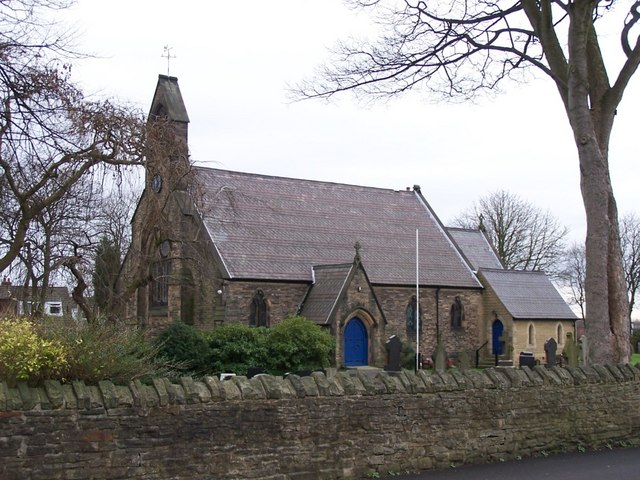
- St Mary's Church, Lowton, from the southwest

- Location in Greater Manchester
- OS grid reference: SJ 63513 97870
- Location: Newton Road, Lowton, Wigan, Greater Manchester
- Country: England
- Denomination: Anglican
- Website: A Church Near You

History
- Status: Parish church

Architecture
- Functional status: Active
- Architect: E. G. Paley
- Architectural type: Church
- Style: Gothic Revival
- Groundbreaking: 1860
- Completed: 1861

Administration
- Province: York
- Diocese: Liverpool
- Archdeaconry: Warrington
- Deanery: Winwick
- Parish: St Mary, Lowton

Clergy
- Rector: Rev Helen Coffey

St Mary's Church is an Anglican parish church in Newton Road, Lowton, Wigan, Greater Manchester, England. It is in the deanery of Winwick, the archdeaconry of Warrington, and the diocese of Liverpool.

== History ==
In 1850 Knott's Mill was built in the village, some distance from the nearest church of St Luke. Initially services were held in the Church Inn, and it was decided to build a church for the mill workers. It was designed by the Lancaster architect E. G. Paley, and built between 1859 and 1861 at a cost of £1,073.75 (equivalent to £110,000 in 2025). The church was consecrated on 21 November 1861 by the Bishop of Chester. It provided seating for 345 people. In 1961 to celebrate the centenary of the church, a new choir vestry was added, and was dedicated by the Bishop of Warrington.

== Architecture ==
The church is described as being "modest". The west front contains a three-light window flanked by buttresses. Above this is an arch carrying a double bellcote. There are no aisles. The two-manual pipe organ was built in 1932 by Rushworth and Dreaper of Liverpool, and rebuilt in 1988 by David Wells, also of Liverpool.

== External features ==
The churchyard contains the war graves of a soldier of World War I, and a soldier, an airman and a Royal Navy Captain of World War II.

== See also ==
- List of ecclesiastical works by E. G. Paley
