= St Paul's Church, Brookhouse =

Coordinates: 54.0753°N 2.7011°W

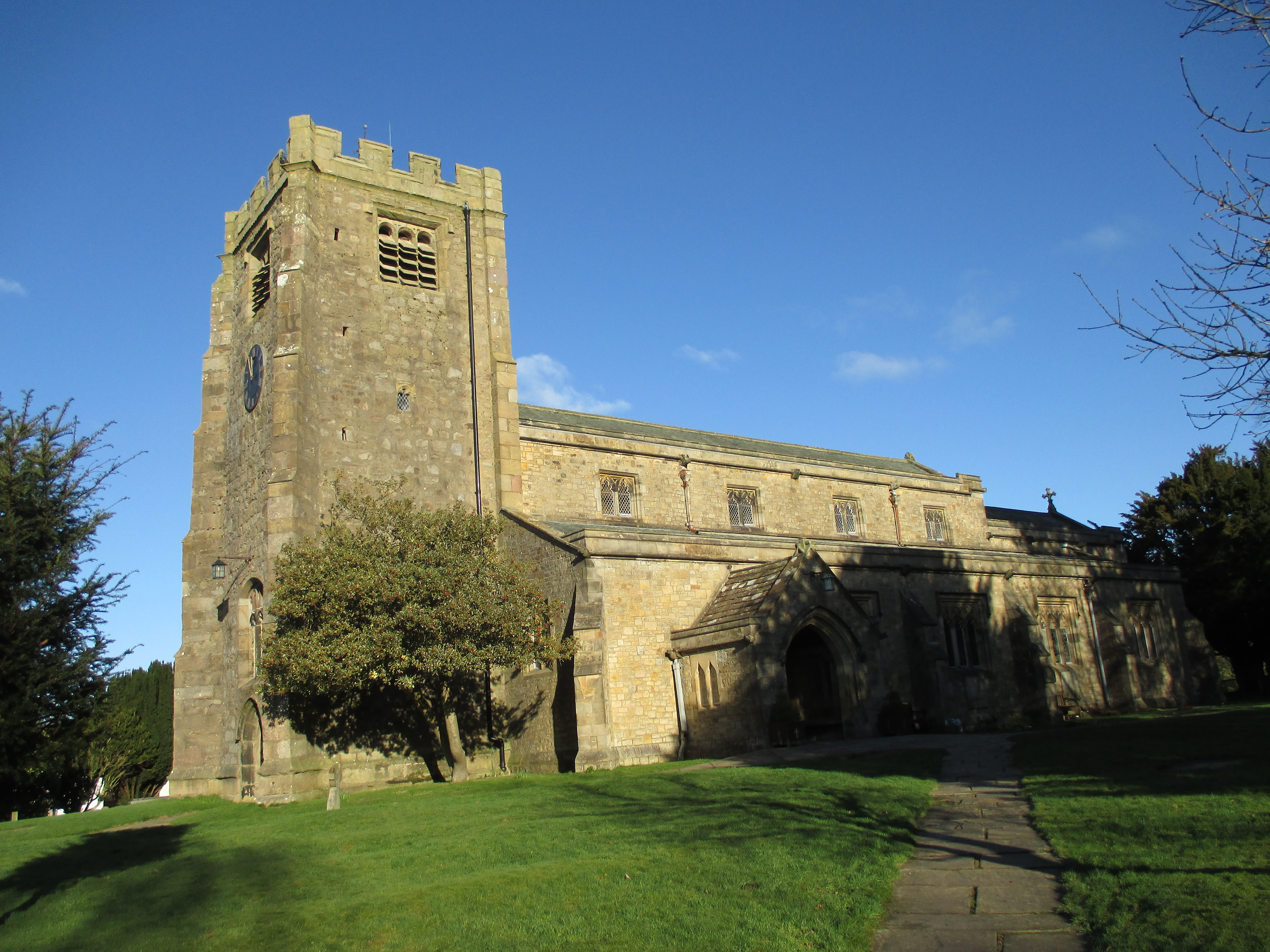
- St Paul's Church, Brookhouse, from the southwest

- Location in the City of Lancaster district
- OS grid reference: SD 542,646
- Location: Brookhouse, Caton-with-Littledale, Lancashire
- Country: England
- Denomination: Anglican
- Website: St Paul, Brookhouse

History
- Status: Parish church
- Founded: Before 1230
- Dedication: Saint Paul

Architecture
- Functional status: Active
- Heritage designation: Grade II*
- Designated: 4 October 1967
- Architect: E. G. Paley
- Architectural type: Church
- Style: Norman, Perpendicular, Gothic Revival
- Completed: 1867

Specifications
- Materials: Sandstone rubble, slate roof

Administration
- Province: York
- Diocese: Blackburn
- Archdeaconry: Lancaster
- Deanery: Tunstall

Clergy
- Vicar: Revd Helen Scamman

St Paul's Church is in the village of Brookhouse, Caton-with-Littledale, Lancashire, England. It is an active Anglican parish church in the deanery of Tunstall, the archdeaconry of Lancaster, and the diocese of Blackburn. The church is recorded in the National Heritage List for England as a designated Grade II* listed building.

== History ==
The earliest record of a church or chapel on the site is before 1230. The tower dates probably from the 16th century. The rest of the church was rebuilt in 1865–67 to a design by the Lancaster architect E. G. Paley. Its estimated cost was £4,000 (equivalent to £390,000 in 2025). Paley worshipped in the church, as he had a country house nearby, and when his son Harry died (who succeeded his father in the architectural practice), he was buried in the churchyard.

== Architecture ==
=== Exterior ===
The church is constructed in sandstone rubble, with a slate roof. Its plan consists of a four-bay nave with a clerestory, north and south aisles, a south porch, a north transept containing the organ chamber, a chancel at a lower level, and a west tower. The tower is Perpendicular in style, and has three stages, diagonal buttresses, and an embattled parapet. On the west side is a doorway, over which is a three-light window with Perpendicular tracery. The bell openings also have three lights. On the south side of the church is the porch, with four bays to the east. The bays are separated by buttresses and each contains a three-light window with Perpendicular tracery. To the left of the easternmost window is a priest's door. Along the clerestory are four windows. The east window has three lights with Perpendicular tracery. In the west wall of the north aisle is a blocked Norman doorway containing a tympanum carved with human figures. It is filled in with coffin lids and medieval cross slabs.

=== Interior ===
The four-bay arcades are carried on octagonal piers. The reredos is a copy of an Annunciation by Filippo Lippi, carved by a local artist. Its gilded frame was made by Shrigley and Hunt. Some of the stained glass is also by Shrigley and Hunt, with other windows by Abbott and Company. Some of the memorials have been moved from the earlier church. The earliest of these date from 1775 and 1795, the others dating from the early and mid-19th century. The organ was built by Conacher.

== See also ==
- Grade II* listed buildings in Lancashire
- Listed buildings in Caton-with-Littledale
- List of ecclesiastical works by E. G. Paley
