= St James' Church, Poolstock =

Coordinates: 53.5358°N 2.6379°W

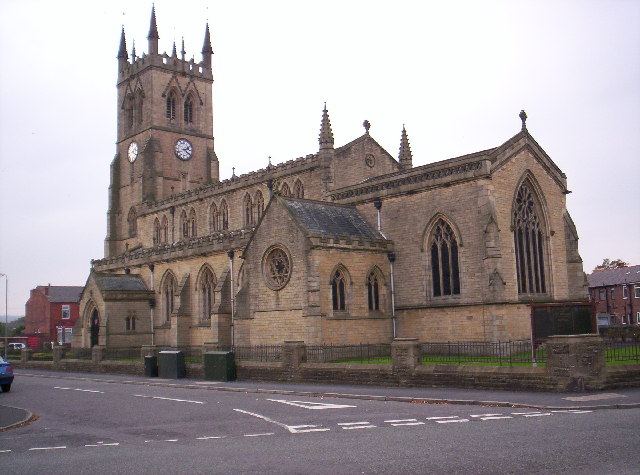
- St James' Church, Poolstock, from the southeast

- Location in Greater Manchester
- OS grid reference: SD 578,045
- Location: Poolstock, Wigan, Greater Manchester
- Country: England
- Denomination: Anglican
- Website: St James with St Thomas, Wigan

History
- Status: Parish church
- Founder: James C. Eckersley
- Consecrated: 15 September 1866

Architecture
- Functional status: Active
- Heritage designation: Grade II*
- Designated: 11 July 1983
- Architect: E. G. Paley
- Architectural type: Church
- Style: Gothic Revival
- Groundbreaking: 1863
- Completed: 1866

Specifications
- Materials: Sandstone, slate roofs

Administration
- Province: York
- Diocese: Liverpool
- Archdeaconry: Wigan & West Lancashire
- Deanery: Wigan
- Parish: Wigan West

St James' Church is in the Poolstock district of Wigan, Greater Manchester, England. It is an active Anglican parish church in the deanery of Wigan, the archdeaconry of Wigan & West Lancashire, and the diocese of Liverpool. The church is recorded in the National Heritage List for England as a designated Grade II* listed building.

== History ==
The foundation stone was laid on 1 September 1863. The church took three years to build and was consecrated on 15 September 1866. It was the centrepiece of a workers' industrial village, and was paid for by Nathaniel Eckersley, a local colliery proprietor, MP for Wigan, and member of a mill-owning family. The Patron Saint of St James was chosen in memory of James Eckersley, the brother of the founder. The estimate for the cost of its building was over £15,000 (equivalent to £1,540,000 in 2025). It was designed by the Lancaster architect E. G. Paley. In 1970 the neighbouring Church of St Thomas closed, and the two parishes merged.

== Architecture ==
=== Exterior ===
The church is constructed in sandstone from Parbold in Lancashire. The roofs are slated. Its architectural style is Decorated. The plan consists of a five-bay nave with a clerestory, north and south aisles, a south porch, a two-bay chancel with a chapel to the south and a vestry to the north, and a west tower. The tower is large, in five stages, with angle buttresses rising to the fourth stage. In the bottom stage is a west arched doorway containing double doors, over which is a four-light window. In the third stage is a crocketted niche containing the date 1866 on the west side and two-light windows on the north and south sides. The fourth stage has clock faces, and the top stage contains pairs of two-light gabled and louvred bell openings on each side. At the summit is a frieze decorated with ball flowers under a pierced parapet with crocketted pinnacles. The parapets of the naves and aisles are battlemented, with pierced triangular upstands between the bays. At the east end of the nave are crocketted pinnacles. The two-light clerestory windows are in pairs, and along the aisles are three-light windows. The chancel is at a lower level and has a parapet of pierced trefoils. On its south side, the first bay contains a chapel with a rose window on the south side, and two-light windows on the sides. In the second bays is a three-light window. The east window is large, and has five lights.

=== Interior ===
The arcades are carried on alternate octagonal and quatrefoil columns. The paired clerestory windows have detached marble shafts. The stone reredos is ornate. Below the east window is an arcade, and on each side of the window are two tiers of niches containing statues. The south chapel contains furnishings moved from St Thomas' Church. The north and south chancel windows contain stained glass by Hardman. The two-manual organ was made in 1865–66 by Hill and Son at a cost of £375 (equivalent to £39,000 in 2025). It is thought that the organ case was designed by Paley. There is a ring of eight bells, all cast in 1896 by Mears and Stainbank of the Whitechapel Bell Foundry.

== See also ==
- Grade II* listed buildings in Greater Manchester
- Listed buildings in Wigan
- List of churches in Greater Manchester
- List of ecclesiastical works by E. G. Paley
