= St Garmon's Church, Capel Garmon =

Church in Conwy County Borough, Wales

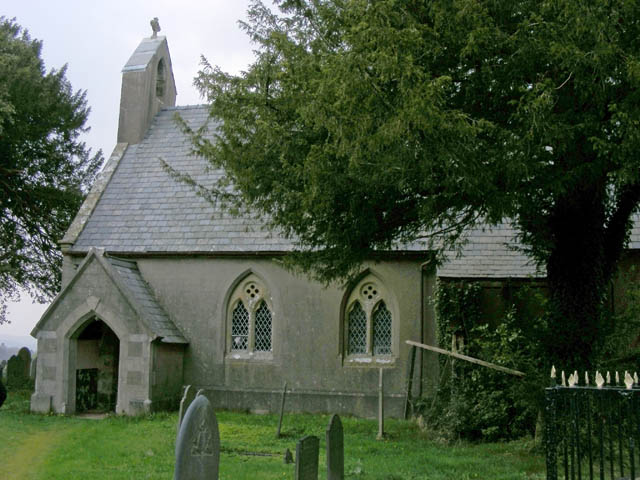
- West end of St Garmon's Church, Capel Garmon, from the south
- St Garmon's Church, Capel Garmon
- 53.0822°N 3.7691°W
- OS grid reference: SH 816 555
- Location: Capel Garmon, Conwy
- Country: Wales
- Denomination: Church in Wales

Architecture
- Architect: E. G. Paley
- Groundbreaking: 1862
- Completed: 1863

St Garmon's Church, Capel Garmon, is a redundant Anglican parish church in the village of Capel Garmon, Conwy, Wales. The church was restored and reseated in 1862–63 by the Lancaster architect E. G. Paley at a cost of £880 (equivalent to £100,000 in 2025). During the restoration, the south wall was rebuilt, windows were renewed and a porch and north vestry were added. The seating was increased from 145 to 150. The church consists of a single chamber. The windows contain plate tracery. Its exterior is partly rendered. The church is now closed and, as of 2006, it was being used as a builder's store.
