= St George's Church, Barrow-in-Furness =

Coordinates: 54.1084°N 3.2209°W

St. George's Church
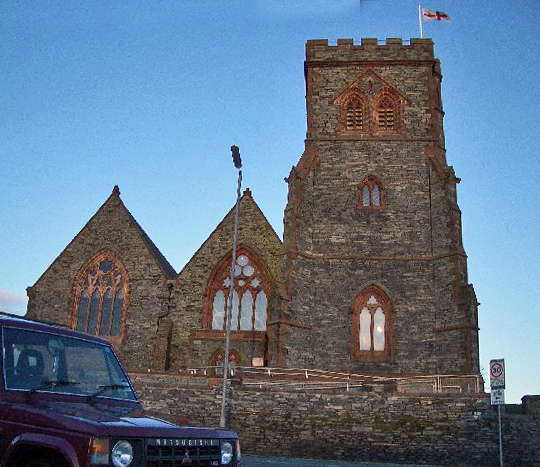
- St. George's Church, viewed from the west

- Location in Cumbria
- OS grid reference: SD 203,688
- Location: St George's Square, Barrow-in-Furness, Cumbria
- Country: England
- Denomination: Anglican
- Website: South Barrow Team Ministry

History
- Status: Parish church
- Founder(s): Duke of Buccleuch, Duke of Devonshire
- Dedication: Saint George

Architecture
- Functional status: Active
- Heritage designation: Grade II
- Designated: 6 May 1976
- Architect(s): E. G. Paley, Paley and Austin
- Architectural type: Church
- Style: Gothic Revival
- Groundbreaking: 1859
- Completed: 1883

Specifications
- Materials: Slate with sandstone dressings Slate roofs

Administration
- Province: York
- Diocese: Carlisle
- Archdeaconry: Westmorland and Furness
- Deanery: Barrow
- Parish: St. George with St Luke Barrow-in-Furness

Clergy
- Vicar: Revd. Carl Harding Revd. Aimee Lynch (interim)

St. George's Church is in St George's Square, Barrow-in-Furness, Cumbria, England. It is the oldest active Anglican parish church in the town. The church is in the deanery of Barrow, the archdeaconry of Westmorland and Furness, and the diocese of Carlisle. Its benefice is united with those of St Aidan, Newbarns, St Luke, Risedale, and St Perran, Roose, to form the South Barrow Team Ministry. The church is recorded in the National Heritage List for England as a designated Grade II listed building. It stands at the southeast extremity of the town.

== History ==
The church was built between 1859 and 1861, to a design by the Lancaster architect E. G. Paley. Its patrons were the Duke of Buccleuch and the Duke of Devonshire. It was built at the suggestion of Sir James Ramsden to be the parish church in the developing town of Barrow-in-Furness. However it was left in a peripheral position as the town grew away from it, and especially when the railway station was relocated in 1882. The north aisle was added in 1867 by Paley, increasing the seating capacity to nearly 1,000. In 1883 the Ramsden Chapel was added, and the chancel was increased in size, being made higher and longer. In the Ramsden Chapel seating was added for use in civic occasions. This work was carried out by the partnership of Paley and Austin. The stained glass in the east window was destroyed in the Second World War. In 1982 the north aisle was partitioned off, and most of its furnishings were removed. Since the partitioning, the north aisle has been used as a church hall.

== Architecture ==
=== Exterior ===
St. George's is constructed in dry-jointed slate with red sandstone dressings; the roofs are slated. The slate came from the Duke of Devonshire's quarries at Kirkby, and the sandstone from St Bees. Its plan consists of a five-bay nave with north and south aisles under separate roofs, south and west porches, a two-bay chancel with a chapel to the south, an organ chamber and a vestry to the north, and a tower at the west end of the south aisle. The tower is in three stages with diagonal buttresses, and an octagonal stair turret at its southeast corner. The parapet is embattled. The windows contain Geometric tracery.

=== Interior ===
The arcades are carried on alternate octagonal and circular piers, their capitals being carved with foliage. The stained glass in the east window dates from 1951 and was designed by A. F. Erridge of Whipple and Company. Also in the church is stained glass by Hardman, and by Shrigley and Hunt. The church had a three-manual organ built in 1881 by Young, but this was scrapped in the 1980s and replaced with an electronic organ.

== See also ==
- List of ecclesiastical works by E. G. Paley
- List of ecclesiastical works by Paley and Austin
- List of places of worship in Barrow-in-Furness
- Listed buildings in Barrow-in-Furness
