= St Anne's Church, Singleton =

Coordinates: 53.8379°N 2.9360°W

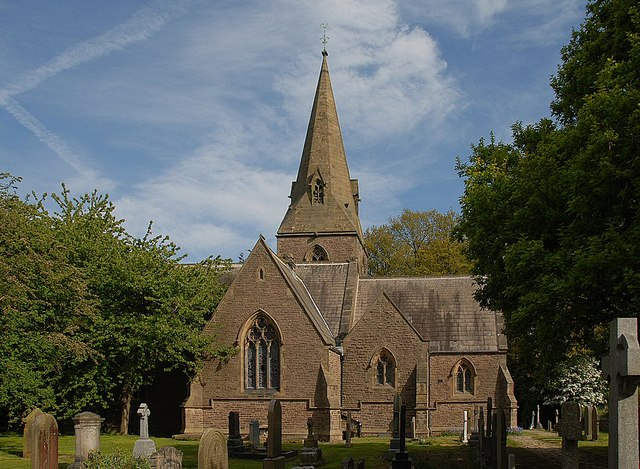
- Pictured in 2009

- Location in the Borough of Fylde
- OS grid reference: SD 3850 3837
- Location: Church Road, Singleton, Lancashire
- Country: England
- Denomination: Anglican
- Website: St Anne, Singleton

History
- Status: Parish church

Architecture
- Functional status: Active
- Heritage designation: Grade II
- Designated: 11 June 1986
- Architect: E. G. Paley
- Architectural type: Church
- Style: Gothic Revival
- Groundbreaking: 1859
- Completed: 1860

Administration
- Province: York
- Diocese: Blackburn
- Archdeaconry: Lancaster
- Deanery: Poulton
- Parish: Singleton St Anne

Clergy
- Vicar: Revd Martin Keighley

St Anne's Church is an active Anglican parish church located on Church Road in Singleton, Lancashire, England. It is in the deanery of Poulton, the archdeaconry of Lancaster, and the Diocese of Blackburn. Its benefice is united with those of St Chad, Poulton, and St Hilda, Carleton. It is recorded in the National Heritage List for England as a designated Grade II listed building.

== History ==
The church was built to replace an earlier church that had been demolished in 1859. It was paid for by Thomas Miller, a Preston mill owner, who had purchased the Singleton estate. It was built between 1859 and 1860, and designed by the Lancaster architect E. G. Paley. In 1938–39 the successors on Paley's practice, now known as Austin and Paley, added a vestry at a cost of £775. The church was designated as a Grade II listed building on 11 June 1986. Grade II listing is for buildings that are "nationally important and of special interest".

== Architecture ==
The church designed in the Early English style. It is constructed of sandstone rubble and has a slate roof. The plan consists of a nave, chancel, south transept and a steeple to the north-east. There are no aisles. The steeple has angled buttresses and is topped by a broach spire. The authors of the Buildings of England series express the opinion that the steeple is "well-proportioned". The windows have plate tracery; most are two-light and there are four-light dormers at the east end of the nave. The chancel has a wagon roof. Inside the church are monuments to the Miller family of Singleton Hall.

== Organ ==
The organ was installed c. 1875, built by the Huddersfield-based Peter Conacher. It is positioned in the south chancel. The instrument consists of two manuals and a radiating pedal board.

== Choir ==
The parish does not have a resident choir. However, a SATB choir called The Occasional Singers, regularly visit the church to perform at major feast days, weddings and funerals, under the leadership of organist, Tony Brindle.

== Bell tower ==
The church does not have a resident group of bell-ringers; however, a group of bell-ringers from Kirkham attend the church for weddings.

== External features ==
The church lychgate listed at Grade II. It is constructed of timber with a red tile roof. An inscription reads "T.H. Miller 1879". The churchyard contains the war graves of two soldiers of World War I.

== See also ==
- Listed buildings in Singleton, Lancashire
- List of ecclesiastical works by E. G. Paley
