= Poolstock Stadium =

Greyhound racing venue in Wigan, England

- Location: Park Street, Poolstock, Wigan, Greater Manchester, England
- Coordinates: 53°32′15″N 2°38′27″W
- Opened: 1932
- Closed: 1973

Poolstock Stadium was a greyhound racing and speedway stadium on Park Street in Poolstock, Wigan, Greater Manchester, England.

== Origins ==
The stadium was constructed in 1932 on a plot of land on Cromwell's Ditch, west of Park Street and Baker Street and east of Poolstock Brook.

== Opening ==
The stadium situated on a ten-acre site opened on 9 March 1932.

== Greyhound racing ==
The racing was independent (not affiliated to the sports governing body the National Greyhound Racing Club). Five dog races were held on Saturday nights at 7.30pm on a track that had grass straights and sanded bends. Race distances were 314, 525 and 750 yards behind an 'Inside Sumner' hare system.

== Speedway ==
Speedway took place from 1947 to 1948 and again in 1960. Laurel and Hardy made a personal appearance at a meeting in 1947.

== Closure ==
Planning permission for 130 homes to be built was given to John Maunders Construction Ltd in early 1973. Racing finally stopped on 28 February 1973 and the track was demolished. The site today is an extension of the housing on Baker Street.
