= St James' Church, Barrow-in-Furness =

Church in Barrow-in-Furness, Cumbria, England

St. James' Church
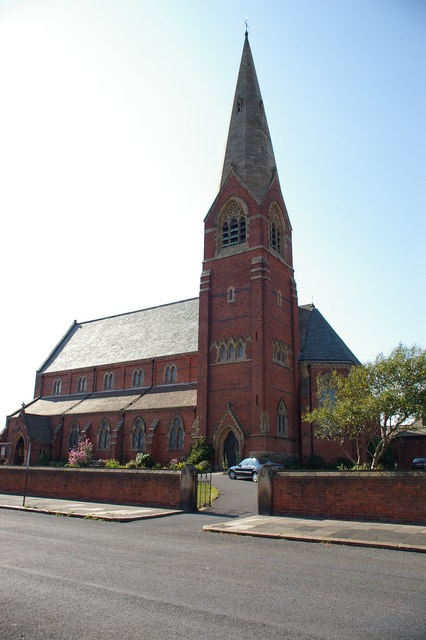

Religion
- Affiliation: Church of England
- Status: Active

Location
- Location: Hindpool, Barrow-in-Furness, Cumbria, England
- Interactive map of St. James' Church
- Coordinates: 54.1190°N 3.2337°W

Architecture
- Architect: Edward Graham Paley
- Style: Gothic Revival
- Completed: 1869
- Spire height: 45.7 metres (150 ft)

Website
- The Church of St James Barrow Bells Website

St. James Church located on Blake Street in Barrow-in-Furness, belongs to the Church of England's Diocese of Carlisle within the ecclesiastical Province of York. The present church building dates from the mid-19th century and is Grade II* listed.

== Background ==
St. James' was established in 1867 and construction of the building itself was completed in 1869, it was only the second Anglican church to be built in the rapidly growing town. With a capacity of over 1,000 worshipers, St. James' is the largest place of worship in the town; architecturally the building is also one of the most prominent features in the Barrow skyline. The spire of St. James' stands at 45.7 m (150 ft), while the length and breadth of the building come to 39 m (128 ft) and 18.3 m (60 ft) respectively.

The church also has a notable organ that was commissioned in 1837 to be designed and built by William Hill, and originally installed in the Chapel Royal of St. James's Palace, London. This fine organ would have been used for the wedding service on 10 February 1840 between Queen Victoria and Prince Albert. In 1865 the organ was removed (to be replaced), the original organ completed a move to its current location in 1868, and was rebuilt with a new action (and an additional 400 pipes) in 1884. Although heavily damaged in the 1941 Barrow Blitz during World War II, the church was re-opened in 1943.

== Bell restoration ==
Extensive restoration during the 1990s has resulted in the building's current appearance. The tower contains a ring of 8 bells cast in 1877 by John Warner and Sons bell foundry at Cripplegate. The bells stopped ringing in 1999 when the church roof and West window masonry were replaced. When the scaffolding was taken down, the bells were inspected and declared unsafe to ring. A major appeal to restore the bells was undertaken between 2008 and 2014, with the bells being cleaned, re-tuned, and rehung with a brand new frame and fittings at a lower position in the tower. The heaviest bell now weighs 12cwt 0qtr 24 lb (almost two-thirds of a ton). The Rt. Revd. James Newcome (Bishop of Carlisle) rededicated the bells at a special service on Sunday 9 March 2014.

== See also ==
- Listed buildings in Barrow-in-Furness
- List of places of worship in Barrow-in-Furness
- List of ecclesiastical works by E. G. Paley
