= Holy Trinity Church, Bury =

Coordinates: 53.5890°N 2.2888°W

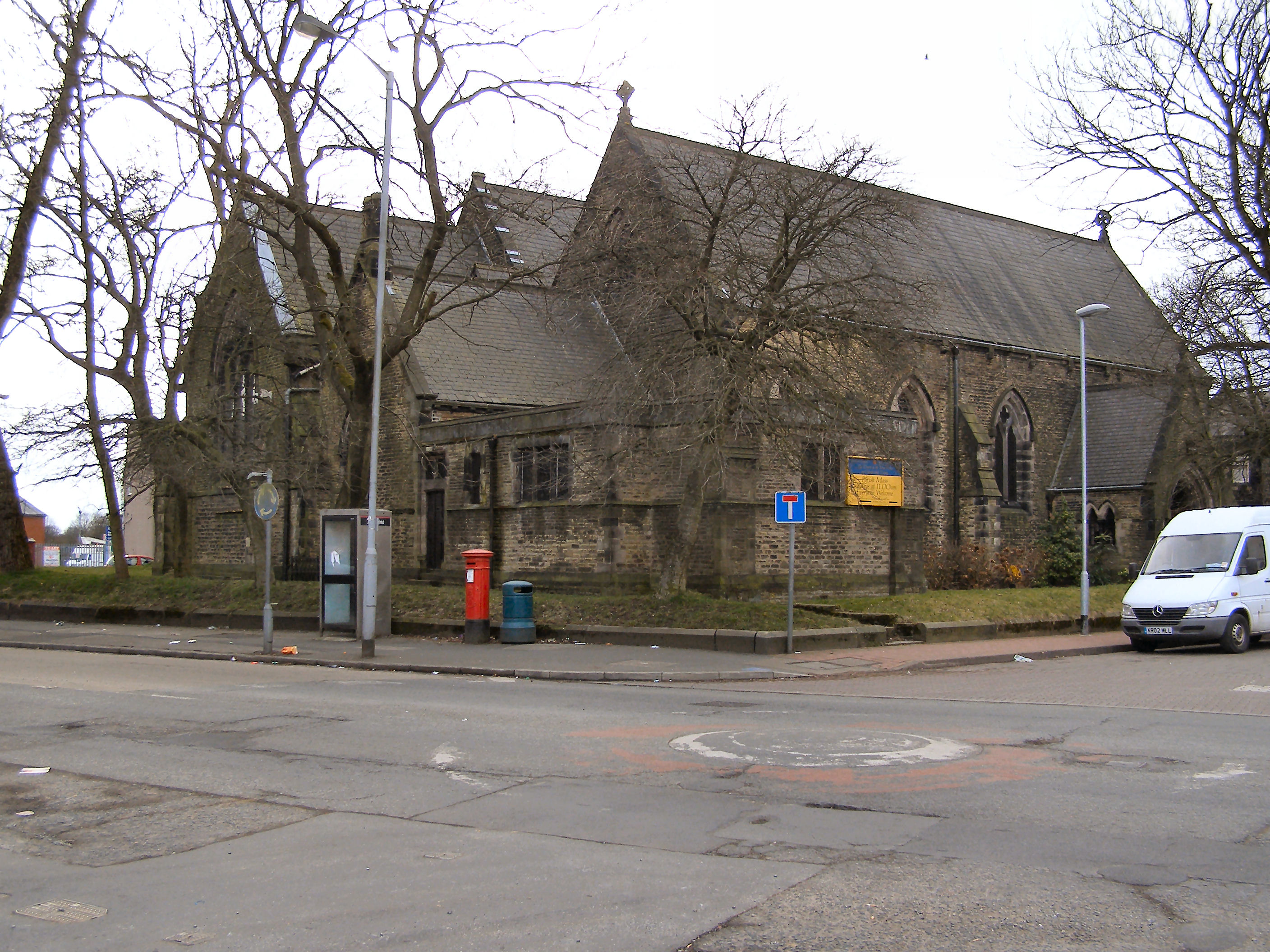
- Holy Trinity Church, Bury

- Location in Greater Manchester
- OS grid reference: SD 810,103
- Location: Bury, Greater Manchester
- Country: England
- Denomination: Anglican

History
- Status: Parish church

Architecture
- Functional status: Redundant
- Heritage designation: Grade II
- Designated: 23 October 2004
- Architect: E. G. Paley
- Architectural type: Church
- Style: Gothic Revival
- Completed: 1863
- Construction cost: £5,500
- Closed: 30 November 2010

Specifications
- Capacity: 627
- Materials: Coursed rock-faced sandstone with ashlar dressings Welsh slate roofs

Administration
- Province: York
- Diocese: Manchester
- Archdeaconry: Bolton
- Deanery: Bury
- Parish: Roch Valley

Holy Trinity Church is in Spring Street, Bury, Greater Manchester, England. It is a redundant Anglican parish church in the diocese of Manchester. The church is recorded in the National Heritage List for England as a designated Grade II listed building.

== History ==
The church was built between 1863 and 1865 at a cost of about £5,500 (equivalent to £600,000 in 2025). It was designed by the Lancaster architect E. G. Paley. The original plan included a south aisle and a north tower with a spire, but these were never built. The site was given by the 14th Earl of Derby, who also donated £1,000. As built, the church provided seating for 627 people. The church was extended in about 1920. Edward Hordern, the father of the British actor Michael Hordern, was a rector at the church, likely around the turn of the 20th century. On 30 November 2010 the church was declared redundant, and its parish was merged with those of St Peter, Bury, and St Thomas, Bury, forming the new parish of Roch Valley. As of 2011, it was planned to sell it for use as a children's nursery and an early learning centre.

== Architecture ==
Holy Trinity Church is constructed in coursed rock-faced sandstone with ashlar dressings. It has Welsh slate roofs. The architectural style is Early English. Its plan consists of a nave, a north aisle with a porch, a chancel with a Lady chapel and a vestry to the north. As the arcade runs down the centre of the church, it is described in the Buildings of England series as a "double-naved church", with "the chancel attached to the south nave". The windows at the east and west ends contain "heavy plate tracery". The arcade has five bays and is carried on round piers. Between the aisle and the Lady chapel is a three-bay arcade. In the Lady chapel is a brightly painted reredos, added in 1987 as a First World War memorial.

== See also ==
- Listed buildings in Bury
- List of churches in Greater Manchester
- List of ecclesiastical works by E. G. Paley
