= Singleton, Lancashire =

Village in Lancashire, England

Coordinates: 53.837°N 2.942°W

Singleton
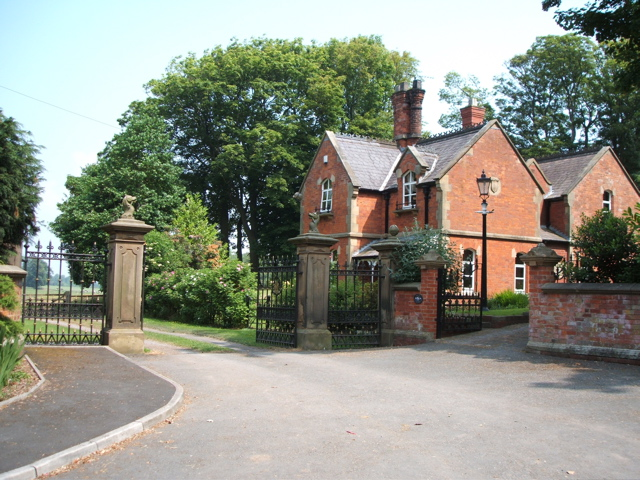
- Singleton Park Gatehouse

- Shown within Fylde Borough Shown within the Fylde Location within Lancashire
- Population: 923 (2021)
- OS grid reference: SD380382
- Civil parish: Singleton
- District: Fylde
- Shire county: Lancashire
- Region: North West
- Country: England
- Sovereign state: United Kingdom
- Post town: POULTON-LE-FYLDE
- Postcode district: FY6
- Dialling code: 01253
- Police: Lancashire
- Fire: Lancashire
- Ambulance: North West
- UK Parliament: Fylde

Singleton is a village and civil parish in Lancashire, England. It is situated on the coastal plain called the Fylde. It is located south-east of Poulton-le-Fylde, and at the 2001 census had a population of 877, increasing to 889 at the 2011 Census. It increased again in 2021 Census to 923. The parish is sometimes referred to as two parts: Great Singleton, the larger part containing the village, and Little Singleton, a small area north of the village bordering the River Wyre.

== History ==
At the time of the Roman conquest of Britain in the 1st century AD, the area around Singleton was inhabited by a Celtic tribe called the Setantii. The village was recorded in the Domesday Book of 1086 as Singletun. The "Single" in Singleton is thought to derive from the Anglo-Saxon word "scingol" (shingle, a thin piece of wood used as a house-tile) while "tun" is the Anglo-Saxon word for a farmstead or village. Thus, Singleton would appear to mean "the tun with shingled roof(s)".

Singleton railway station once served the village as part of the Preston and Wyre Joint Railway. The station was situated west of the village, on the road to Blackpool.

Singleton Hall is a Gothic-styled mansion on Lodge Lane, built in 1855 by Thomas Miller Jr (1811–1865), son of a prominent Preston industrialist Thomas Miller Sr. The Hall was later used by Lancashire County Council as a special school for senior boys with disabilities, known as the Singleton Hall Residential Special School for Physically Handicapped Boys (Senior). The hall was largely untouched until 2004–2005, when it was extended and converted into private residences by Crosby Homes. Public pathways outside the hall have been developed and maintained by the Richard Dumbreck Singleton Trust, endowed by Richard Dumbreck, a great-nephew of Thomas Horrocks Miller. Pevsner's The Buildings of England describes the hall as "large and unlovely, in brick and stone trim with an entrance tower and a taller stair-tower. The style is domestic Gothic," and says that "1871–73 is supposed to be the date, but this may refer to extensions." He mentions "unremarkable lodges and various estate buildings," and notes that the hall, and these further buildings, have been converted to flats.

The Miller family also commissioned Singleton's parish church, St Anne's, designed by Lancaster architect Edward Graham Paley and completed in 1861. It has been designated a Grade II listed building by English Heritage.

The village has one public house, the Miller Arms, which is located in a building dating from the 17th century.

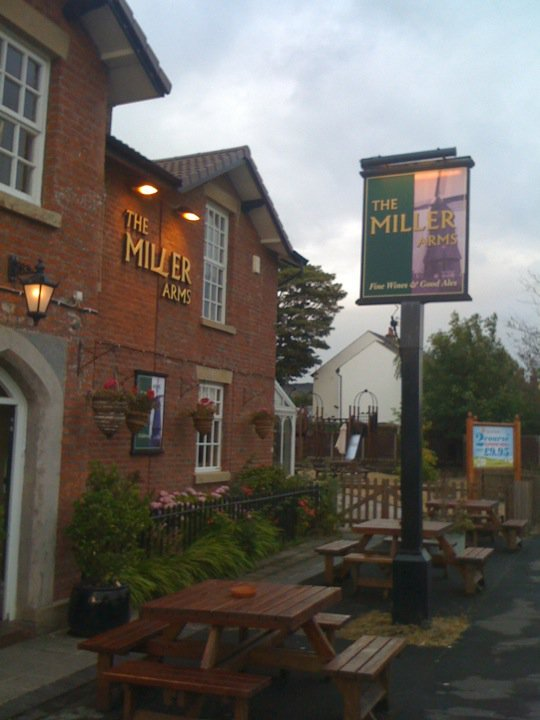
The Miller Arms pub in Singleton.

== Fracking ==
In 2011, drilling equipment was installed at Grange Hill, east of the village, to test for shale gas in the Bowland Shale Formation around 1.2 miles (1.9 km) below the surface. In 2013, Cuadrilla and Centrica made plans for hydraulic fracturing, commonly known as fracking, at the site.

== Governance ==
Singleton is combined with Greenhalgh-with-Thistleton to form the ward of Singleton and Greenhalgh, which elects one councillor. As of 2008, it is represented by Maxine Chew, an independent councillor. Singleton also has a parish council.

The village is represented in the House of Commons of the Parliament of the United Kingdom as part of Fylde. It elects one Member of Parliament (MP) by the first past the post system of election.

== Notable people ==
- Robert Gillow (1704–1772), furniture manufacturer, who founded Gillow & Co
- Henry Lushington (1812–1855), a colonial administrator, chief secretary to the government of Malta and a Cambridge Apostle.
- John Bilsborrow (1836-1903), bishop of the Roman Catholic Diocese of Salford from 1892 to 1903.
- Issette Pearson (1861–1941), an English golfer, who lived in Singleton Hall; the first hon. secretary of the Ladies' Golf Union

== See also ==
- Listed buildings in Singleton, Lancashire
