= Capel Garmon =

Village in Conwy County Borough, Wales

Coordinates: 53.084°N 3.772°W

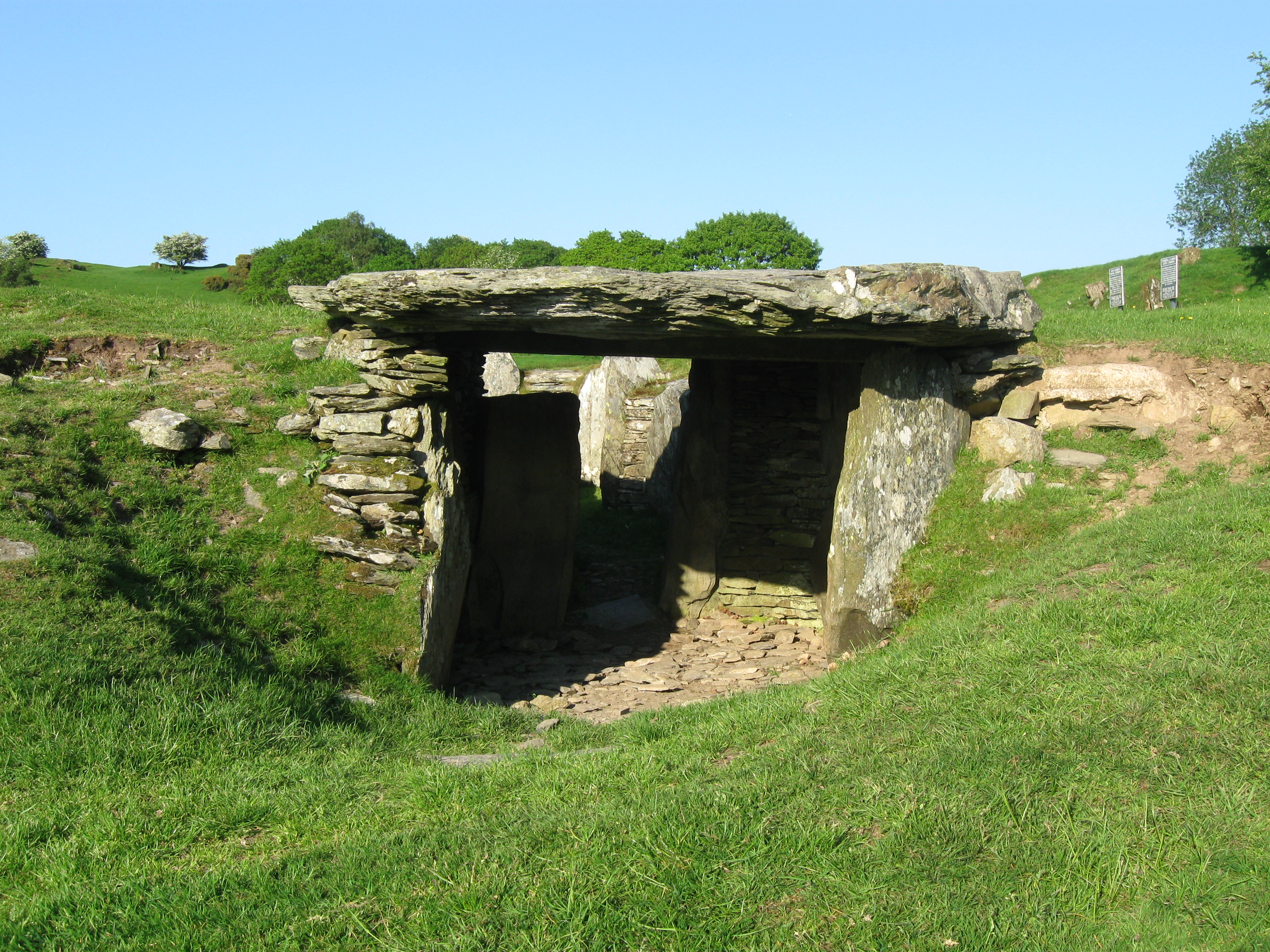
- Capel Garmon Burial Chamber

- Location within Conwy
- OS grid reference: SH813555
- Community: Bro Garmon
- Principal area: Conwy
- Country: Wales
- Sovereign state: United Kingdom
- Post town: LLANRWST
- Postcode district: LL26
- Dialling code: 01690
- Police: North Wales
- Fire: North Wales
- Ambulance: Welsh
- UK Parliament: Bangor Aberconwy
- Senedd Cymru – Welsh Parliament: Aberconwy

Capel Garmon is a village near Betws-y-Coed in the county borough of Conwy, Wales. It is situated high above the Conwy valley, in the community of Bro Garmon, and commands views over Snowdonia. The village is known for the Neolithic burial chamber nearby.

The parish church of St Garmon was originally a chapel of ease to the parish of Llanrwst, serving the areas of Garth Garmon and Tybrith Uchaf. Capel Garmon became a separate parish in 1927. The current chapel, the latest in a series of churches at the site, was consecrated in 1862 but is now closed.

The burial chamber at Capel Garmon dates from the 3rd millennium BC, and belongs to the Severn-Cotswold group. It consists of a passage leading to a rectangular space, with circular chambers branching to the east and west. The structure has undergone much renovation and the current entrance, originally one of the inner chambers, was made in the 19th century, when the tomb was used as a stable.

In addition to sherds of Beaker pottery found in the burial chamber, Capel Garmon was also home to a 1st-century BC iron fire dog which can now be seen at the National Museum of Wales in Cardiff.

The village consists of a small number of houses, a school, a small family run pub; which is open Friday and Saturday evenings as well as Sunday daytime, and several holiday accommodations as well as surrounding working farms.
