= Poolstock =

Coordinates: 53.535654°N 2.637543°W

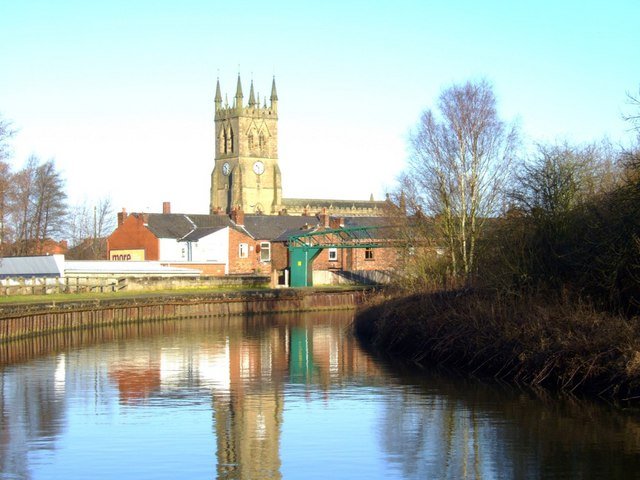
- St James' Church by the Leigh Branch Canal

- Location within Greater Manchester
- OS grid reference: SD577045
- Metropolitan borough: Wigan
- Metropolitan county: Greater Manchester
- Region: North West
- Country: England
- Sovereign state: United Kingdom
- Post town: WIGAN
- Postcode district: WN3
- Dialling code: 01942
- Police: Greater Manchester
- Fire: Greater Manchester
- Ambulance: North West
- UK Parliament: Wigan

Poolstock is a road, the name of which is used to describe the surrounding residential area of Wigan, in Greater Manchester, England.

Poolstock, although it has no specific boundaries, is south of the River Douglas and is situated next to the Leeds and Liverpool Canal and close to Wigan Pier and Wigan town centre which is in walking distance. Situated close to Trenchfield Mill, Poolstock was a perfect place for Millworkers to live.

== Sport ==
The Poolstock Stadium hosted greyhound racing from 1932 to 1973 and speedway from 1947 to 1960 on Park Street. Laurel and Hardy made a personal appearance at a speedway meeting in 1947. The stadium was demolished in 1973.

== See also ==
- St James' Church, Poolstock
