= Lupton, Cumbria =

Village and civil parish in Cumbria, England

Coordinates: 54.225°N 2.686°W

Lupton
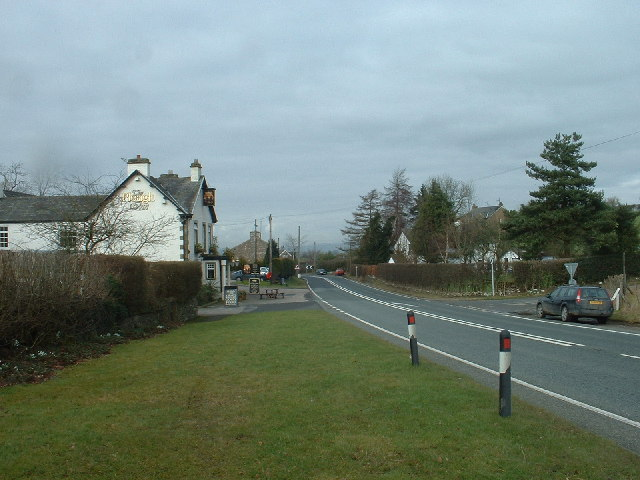
- Lupton

- Location within Cumbria
- Population: 162 (2011)
- OS grid reference: SD5581
- Civil parish: Lupton
- Unitary authority: Westmorland and Furness
- Ceremonial county: Cumbria
- Region: North West
- Country: England
- Sovereign state: United Kingdom
- Post town: CARNFORTH
- Postcode district: LA6
- Dialling code: 01539
- Police: Cumbria
- Fire: Cumbria
- Ambulance: North West
- UK Parliament: Westmorland and Lonsdale

Lupton is a linear village and civil parish in the Westmorland and Furness district of Cumbria, England, along the main A65 road north west of Kirkby Lonsdale, 2.3 miles (3.7 km) from the village of Hutton Roof. In the 2001 census the parish had a population of 165, decreasing slightly at the 2011 census to 162.

As well as All Saints Church, the village has a public house, the Plough. Lupton Tower is an 18th-century house now used as a corporate head office.

== See also ==
- Listed buildings in Lupton, Cumbria
