= Respond =

Vertical support on one side of an arch

In architecture, a respond is a half-pier or half-pillar that is bonded into a wall and designed to carry the springer at one end of an arch.
