= Edward Graham Paley =

English architect (1823–1895)

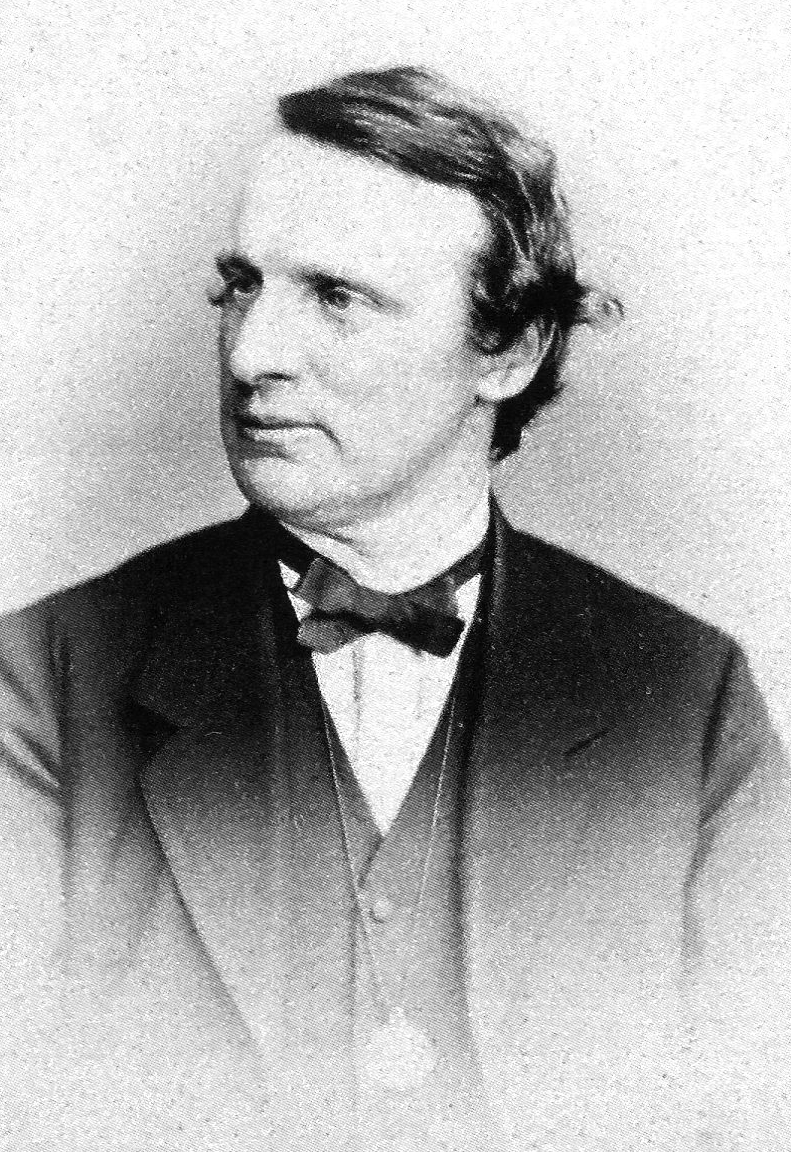
- E. G. Paley in 1868
- Born: 3 September 1823; Easingwold, North Yorkshire, England
- Died: 23 January 1895 (aged 71); Lancaster, Lancashire, England
- Occupation: Architect

Edward Graham Paley, usually known as E. G. Paley (3 September 1823 – 23 January 1895), was an English architect who practised in Lancaster, Lancashire, in the second half of the 19th century. After leaving school in 1838, he went to Lancaster to become a pupil of Edmund Sharpe, and in 1845 he joined Sharpe as a partner. Sharpe retired from the practice in 1851, leaving Paley as the sole principal. In 1868 Hubert Austin joined him as a partner and in 1886 Paley's son, Henry, also became a partner. This partnership continued until Paley's death in 1895.

Paley's major work was the design of new churches, but he also rebuilt restored and made additions and alterations to existing churches. His major new ecclesiastical design was that of St Peter's Church, Lancaster, which became Lancaster Cathedral. He also carried out secular commissions, mainly on country houses in the north-west of England. His largest and most important secular work was the Royal Albert Asylum in Lancaster. When designing churches Paley mainly employed the Gothic Revival style, but in his secular works he used a greater variety of styles, including Tudor Revival and Scottish Baronial as well as Gothic Revival.

Paley played little part in the political life of Lancaster, but he was involved with cultural events and sports in the town. His interests included music and archaeology and he was involved in archery and rowing. In addition to designing the Royal Albert Asylum, he served on its committee, as well as being on the committees of local schools and the Mechanics' Institute. His work tended to be eclipsed in the later part of his career by Austin, and Paley is regarded as having been a competent architect, rather than a great one.

== Early life ==
Edward Paley was born in Easingwold, North Yorkshire, the seventh child and the fourth son of Revd Edmund Paley and Sarah née Apthorp. His older brother, Frederick Apthorp Paley, was a classical scholar. His father was the local vicar, who in turn was second son of William Paley, the Christian apologist. Edward was initially educated at home, and later at Christ's Hospital when it was situated in London. From school he went directly to Lancaster in 1838 to become a pupil of the architect Edmund Sharpe at the age of 15.

== Career and works ==
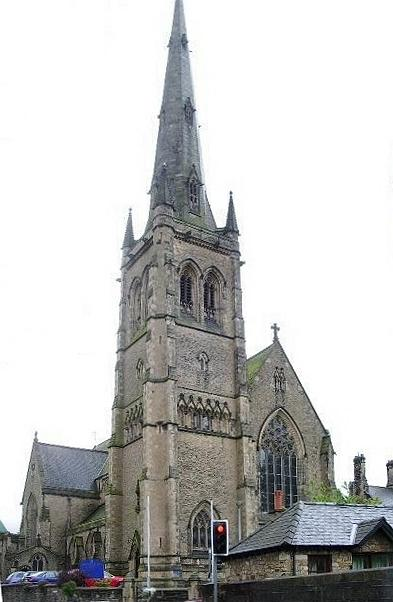
Lancaster Cathedral

=== 1845–68 ===
In 1845, after Paley had completed his articles, Sharpe appointed him as a partner in the practice, which was known as Sharpe and Paley, Architects, (or more usually as Sharpe & Paley). Sharpe then paid more attention to his interests outside the practice, and from 1847 Paley was carrying out most of the work. In 1851, the year of Paley's marriage to Sharpe's sister, Sharpe formally retired from the practice, leaving Paley as sole principal. The practice continued to use the title Sharpe and Paley until 1856, the year Sharpe moved to North Wales; the title was then changed to E. G. Paley. In 1860 Paley moved his office from St Leonard's Gate to 32 Castle Hill (later 24 Castle Park). This building was to serve the practice for the rest of its existence until it closed in 1946. In 1871 Paley took over the ownership of the building.

Between 1845 and 1851 it is difficult to determine how much responsibility each partner took in the commissions undertaken by the practice, but from 1851 it was Paley who was individually responsible. The two partners did work together on the remodelling of Capernwray Hall, and in the rebuilding of All Saints' Church, Wigan. Throughout Paley's career, the design of new churches was his major source of work. Between 1851 and 1867 he was responsible for about 36 new or rebuilt churches. During the 1850s his new churches included St Patrick, Preston Patrick, St Peter, Rylstone (both 1852–53), St Anne, Thwaites (1853–54), Christ Church, Bacup, (1854), and St George, Barrow-in-Furness (1859–60). All these churches were Anglican, but in 1857 came a commission for a Roman Catholic church, St Peter, Lancaster, (which in 1924 became Lancaster Cathedral). With its spire rising to 240 feet (73 m), it is considered to be Paley's finest design. Later major new churches include St Peter, Quernmore, St Anne, Singleton (both 1859–60), St Mark, Preston (1862–63), Holy Trinity, Bury (1863–64), St James, Poolstock (1863–66), St James, Barrow (1867–69), and his most substantial church of this period, St Peter, Bolton (1867–71).

Paley also designed a great variety of secular buildings, the most important of which was the Royal Albert Asylum (1868–73), the largest building ever undertaken by the practice. He carried out much work on schools, designing town and village schools, and designing extensions for larger schools, including work for Giggleswick School (1849–51) and, for Rossall School, a chapel (1861–62) and a new east wing (1867). Paley carried out commissions for country houses, including the rebuilding of Wennington Hall (1855–56), and a new house, The Ridding in Bentham, North Yorkshire (1857–60). There was also a variety of smaller works, including a music hall in Settle, cemetery buildings in Lancaster and Stalmine, and industrial buildings. Paley's career coincided with the growth of the town of Barrow-in-Furness and the development of the Furness Railway and, being the major architect in the area, he gained many commissions relating to the town and the railway. He developed working relationships with the major entrepreneurs, James Ramsden, and Henry Schneider, for whom he designed both domestic and industrial buildings. An early commission was to convert a former manor house into the Furness Abbey Hotel for the railway (1847–48). He later designed a large country house for Ramsden, Abbot's Wood (1857–59, since demolished). Paley's first station for the railway was Strand station in Barrow (1863, since demolished). Subsequently, the practice was to be responsible for most of the buildings required for the railway.

=== 1868–95 ===
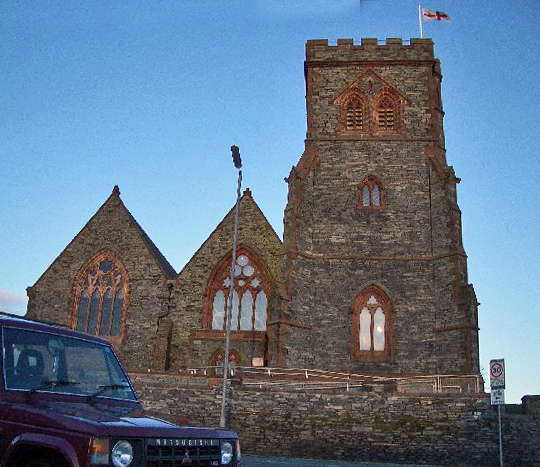
St. George's Church, Barrow-in-Furness

From 1868 until his death in 1895 Paley worked in partnerships. He was joined by Hubert Austin in 1868, when the practice became known as Paley and Austin. Paley's son Henry, usually known as Harry, joined the partnership in 1886, when the practice became Paley, Austin and Paley, a title it retained until Edward Paley's death. From 1868 it is difficult to know what part any one partner contributed to any particular project. Almost all the works were attributed to the partnership as a whole, and not to an individual partner. What is certain is that the firm enjoyed its most successful period and designed most of its most admired buildings during these years. New features appeared, including what Brandwood et al. describe as "a new-found muscularity which tended to be uncharacteristic of Paley's work". Although Paley had occasionally used Perpendicular features in his churches, these were used much more frequently, so much so that the practice is credited with playing a part in what Brandwood et al. term the "Perpendicular revival in the North", and even with playing a "nationally pioneering role" in the "rehabilitation of the Perpendicular style as an acceptable stylistic choice". In addition, later in this period, the use of features derived from the Aesthetic Movement was introduced. It is not known what part Edward Paley played in these developments, but Brandwood et al. argue that they are "undoubtedly attributable to the influence of Austin". This is not to down-play the work done by Paley during this period. Brandwood et al. point out that of the two, Paley had the more outgoing personality, and because of this, and because of his senior position, the writers suggest that he, rather than Austin, would "tend to 'front' many of the dealings of the firm". They also suggest that Paley would be more at ease in dealing with patrons, such as the Duke of Devonshire, in discussing the rebuilding of Holker Hall after the fire of 1871, and that he would have played a greater part in training the pupils in the practice.

Paley did have some individual responsibilities within the practice. He took over from Sharpe as Bridgemaster of the South Lonsdale Hundred in 1860, and in 1868 he was appointed as inspector of Lancaster Gaol and the Judge's Lodgings. He served on the committee of the Royal Albert Asylum for many years, taking much interest in its management. He was a director of the Lancaster Waggon Company, for whom he designed their factory, the Lancaster Carriage and Wagon Works (1864–65). In his role as bridgemaster he was responsible for the new road bridge over the River Lune at Caton (1882–83) following its collapse in 1881. Paley became a fellow of the Royal Institute of British Architects in 1871, served on its council for two periods, and at the time of his death was one of its examiners.

== Architectural styles ==
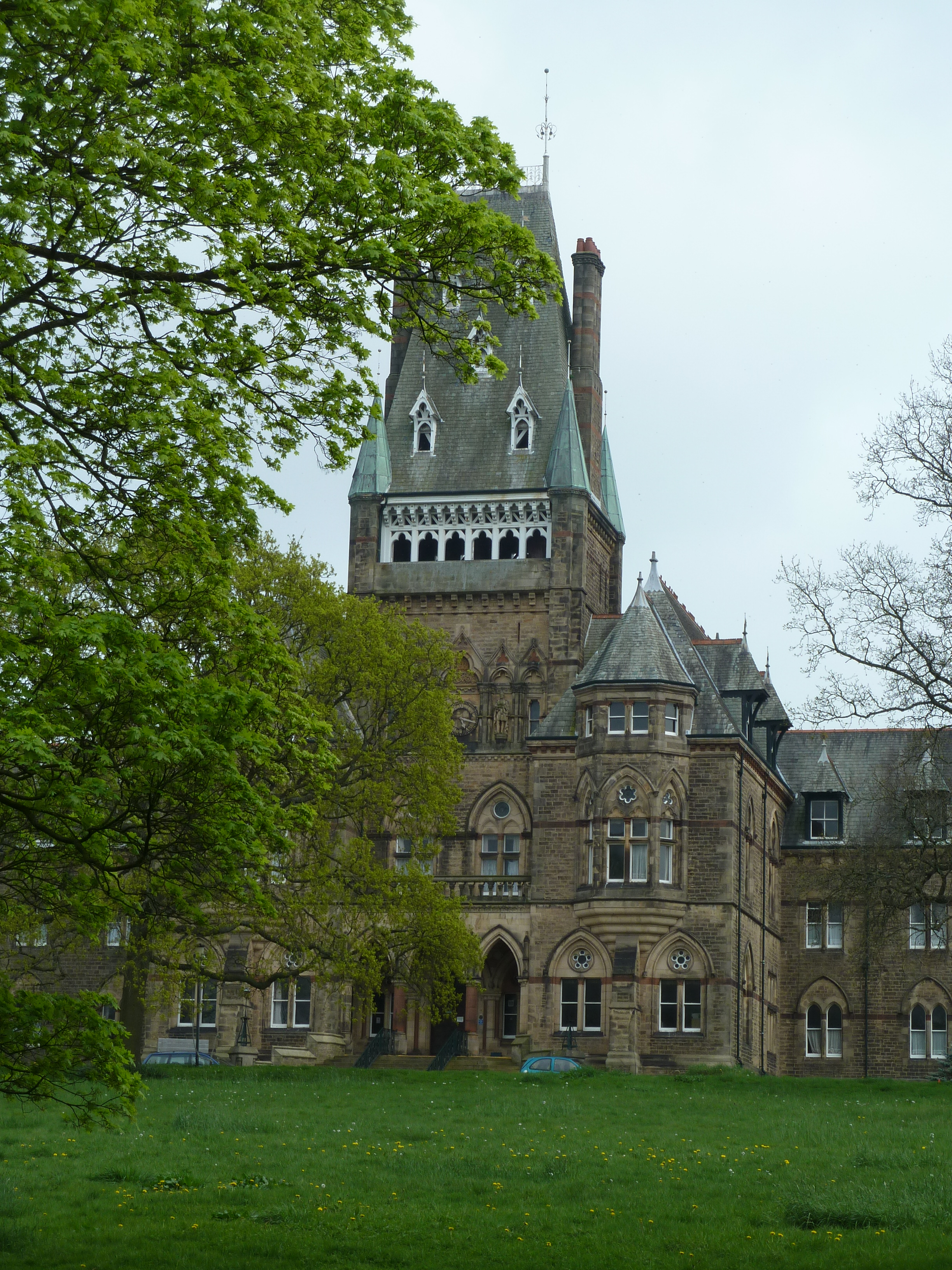
Royal Albert Asylum, Lancaster, showing the tower with its French features

During the first half of the 19th century ecclesiastical architecture was moving away from the Neoclassical style towards Gothic. Initially the churches in Gothic Revival style incorporated Gothic-like features, such as lancet windows, and towers with pinnacles and crockets. This was known as a pre-archaeological style and was used in the first phase of the Commissioners' Churches. A. W. N. Pugin argued that these features should correctly and accurately reflect medieval Gothic architecture rather than mimic it, and Sharpe became an expert in this movement. Paley learned much of this from Sharpe and as a consequence incorporated "correct" Gothic features in his own work. At the same time the Cambridge Camden Society, influenced by the Oxford Movement, were advocating a more sacramental form of liturgy, which required a larger chancel than that normally provided in the Commissioners' Churches. Paley was also influenced in this by his brother, Frederick, who was a member of the Camden Society and was himself an expert on medieval architecture. Most of Paley's churches followed precedents from the 13th and 14th centuries, and were in Early English, or in Decorated style, mainly the latter. Their common plan consisted of open roofs, benches for the congregation, stalls in the chancel, a pulpit to the side of the entrance to the chancel, steps leading up to the chancel, and a font at the west end. Paley is not seen as an innovator in church design, and he did not use devices such as polychromy, which was being introduced elsewhere. He did however introduce Perpendicular features into some of his designs, for example, St Patrick, Preston Patrick, St Peter, Rylstone (both 1852–53), and in the rebuilding of St Paul's Church, Brookhouse (1865–67). Paley's early new churches had plastered interiors, but in 1860 he introduced an interior of bare brick in St Peter, Quernmore. This feature was repeated in a similar manner in later churches including St Mark, Preston, and St James, Barrow.

In his secular commissions, Paley employed a greater variety of architectural styles, including features of Tudor Revival architecture. The earliest major building in which he used this style was Wennington Hall (1855–56). As a contrast was the country house, The Ridding (1857–60), which is in Scottish Baronial style, the only building in which he used this style. Another building in Tudor style is the country house Eccle Riggs (1865). His most important building, the Royal Albert Asylum (1868–73), is Gothic in style, but, in the opinion of Hartwell and Pevsner, it incorporates French features, in particular the steep hipped roof of the central tower. After Hubert Austin joined the practice, it becomes difficult to determine the specific input of any individual partner. New architectural features were introduced, and Brandwood et al. consider that Paley "tends to be overshadowed" by Austin, but the practice continued to design fine buildings throughout the time that Paley was a principal.

== Personal life ==
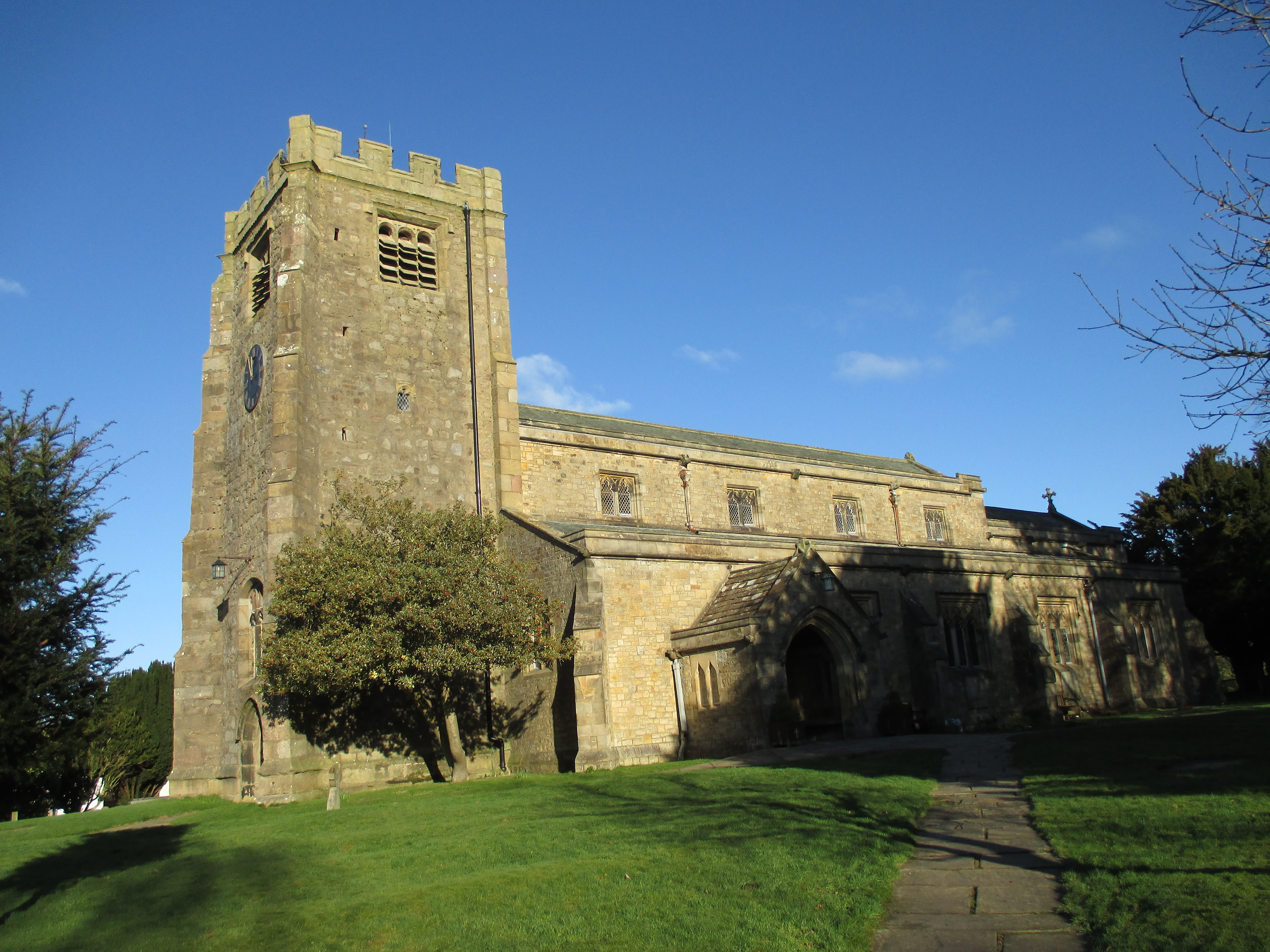
St Paul's Church, Brookhouse, a church attended by Paley that had been largely rebuilt by him

Edward Paley married Frances Sharpe, Edmund Sharpe's sister, in June 1851. They had five children: three daughters followed by two sons, the youngest of whom, Henry Anderson (known as Harry), joined his father as a partner in the practice. The family lived initially at 35 Castle Park, near Lancaster Castle, before moving to a house to the south of Lancaster called The Greaves, which Paley designed himself. He also converted a former workhouse into a country house for himself, called Moorgarth, at Brookhouse, near Caton to the north-east of Lancaster. Paley was a keen Anglican churchman, initially attending Lancaster Priory, and later St Paul's Church, Brookhouse, a church that he largely rebuilt in 1866–67. Paley took little interest in local politics, although he did serve as a Conservative councillor for three years from 1858; he declined to be renominated at the end of his term. He was involved in other ways in social concerns, serving on the committees of local schools and the Mechanics' Institute. He also played a major part in establishing the Royal Albert Asylum, designing the building and serving on its committee. Paley shared sporting and musical interests with Sharpe, being a member of the John O'Gaunt Bowmen, and helping Sharpe to set up the Lancaster Rowing Club. Paley and his wife were members of the Lancaster Choral Society, Paley was involved with the Athenaeum Company and the Lancaster Philosophical Society, and in 1873 founded the County Club, a gentleman's club in Lancaster. He was also interested in archaeology, and was a founder member of the Royal Archaeological Society, and a member of the Cumberland and Westmorland Antiquarian and Archaeological Society.

== Death ==
Paley died on 23 January 1895, having suffered from typhoid fever for 20 days. Although he had not played a prominent role in the political life of Lancaster, he had been active in the life of the town, and was given a civic funeral; he was buried in Lancaster Cemetery. His estate amounted to £71,939 (equivalent to £8,180,000 in 2025).

== Appraisal ==
Hartwell and Pevsner consider that the architectural partnership of Austin and Paley "did more outstanding work than any other in the county", and that this work was "outstanding in the national as well as the regional context". (Note: The county referred to was the historic county of Lancashire, which was then much larger than the present ceremonial county; it included parts of what are now Cumbria, Greater Manchester and Merseyside.) Although during the time of the Paley and Austin partnership, Austin has been given more credit for the originality of the designs, Paley had a good reputation as a church architect in his own right. After his death the Architect & Contract Reporter carried an article highlighting this aspect of his work. In respect of St Peter, Lancaster (later Lancaster Cathedral), Brandwood et al. consider it to be "Paley's masterpiece as an independent church architect". In 1901 the German architect and critic Hermann Muthesius mentioned it in his survey of English churches "with some enthusiasm". Nikolaus Pevsner writing in 1969 described it as "a fine, aspiring building", and Pevsner's successors in the Buildings of England series describe it as his "chef d'oeuvre". Later Paley's work tended to be overshadowed by Austin, although it is usually impossible to determine which partner was responsible for which design.

Paley has been described as being "an attractive individual, popular and a leading figure in the life of Lancaster". His obituary in the Lancaster Guardian described him as "one of nature's gentlemen, always cheerful and kindly ... esteemed and respected by all".

== See also ==
- Sharpe, Paley and Austin
- List of works by Sharpe and Paley
- List of ecclesiastical works by E. G. Paley
- List of non-ecclesiastical works by E. G. Paley
- List of ecclesiastical works by Paley and Austin
- List of non-ecclesiastical works by Paley and Austin
