= Adam Hodgson =

English merchant, travel writer and abolitionist

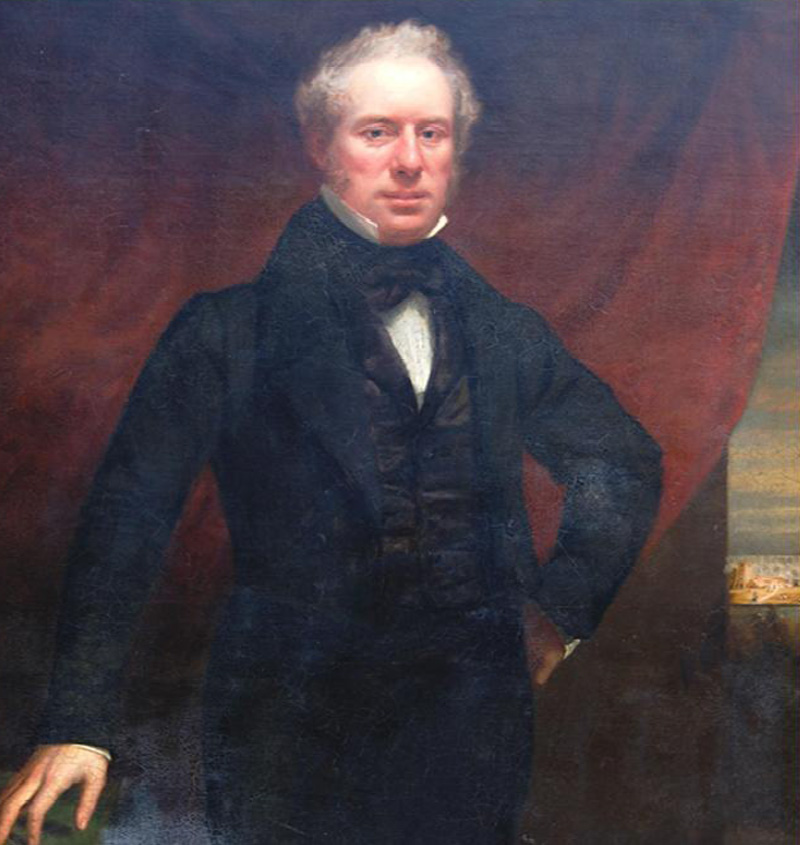
- Born: 1788; Liverpool, U.K.
- Died: 1862 (aged 73–74)
- Occupations: Writer, merchant, abolitionist

Adam Hodgson (1788–1862) was an English merchant in Liverpool, known also as a writer and abolitionist.

== Life ==
He was the son of Thomas Hodgson, a Liverpool merchant, and his wife Elizabeth Lightbody (1758–1795). His father Thomas (1737–1817), from Caton, took part in the Atlantic slave trade, initially in Gambia as an agent for Miles Barber; then from his own fort on the Isle de Los off Sierra Leone, and by investment in slaving ships. He then moved into cotton manufacturing, retiring from business in 1817 after losses. Isaac Hodgson (1783–1847), merchant and banker, was Adam's elder brother, and he had four sisters (Elizabeth, Agnes, Mary and Anna). His aunt Hannah Lightbody married Samuel Greg; the couple established Quarry Bank Mill, a centre of innovation in the cloth business. Adam's cousins included Robert Hyde Greg MP, Samuel Greg Jr. and William Rathbone Greg.

Elizabeth Greg (1790–1882) married William Rathbone V, of the Liverpool mercantile family. She founded the first public wash-houses in the United Kingdom in the wake of the 1832 cholera epidemic, along with Kitty Wilkinson. Later she helped William Forster in formulating the Education Act 1870.

Hodgson was a partner in Rathbone, Hodgson & Co., founded by William Rathbone V and his brother Richard, from 1814. He made a North American tour in 1819–21, sailing the Atlantic in the Courier to New York.

After his return, Hodgson left Rathbone, Hodgson & Co., and went into business as a cotton broker, in 1824, forming Hodgson, Jones & Ryley with William Jones and James Ryley. Jones and Hodgson were also partners in insurance broking, the partnership being dissolved in 1845.

In 1824 Hodgson was on the founding committee of the Liverpool and Manchester Railway Company. Also on the committee was Lister Ellis, Liverpool merchant and plantation owner in British Guiana, and when Ellis died in 1829, Hodgson was one of his executors. In January 1829 he advocated against renewal of the trading monopoly of the East India Company. He was a founder in 1831 of the Bank of Liverpool, with George Holt, Isaac Cooke and others, and became its Managing Director.

At Caton, Hodgson's residence was "Scarthwaite", on the River Lune.

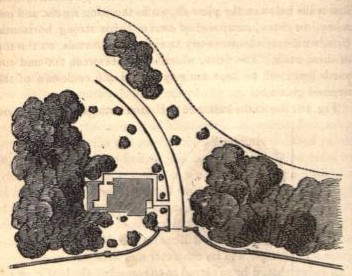
Garden plan by Edward Kemp, published 1858, for Scarthwaite, Adam Hodgson's house at Caton

== Interests ==
Hodgson was one of those who formed a local branch of the British and Foreign Bible Society, in 1810. He was Treasurer of the Liverpool Bethel Union. He mentioned in Letters from North America that he belonged to the Church of England, and he was Treasurer of a Liverpool branch of the Church Missionary Society; he was considered an evangelical.

Isaac, Adam Hodgson's brother, was the secretary of the Liverpool Anti-Slavery Society, properly the Liverpool Society for Promoting the Abolition of Slavery. James Cropper (1773–1840) through business connections with the Rathbone and Benson families came to know the Hodgsons; all three belonged to the Society. He was a friend of Adam, and they collaborated, both writing abolitionist pamphlets advancing economic and ethical arguments.

When John James Audubon visited Liverpool in 1826 with an introduction from Vincent Nolte, Hodgson arranged for him to meet Edward Stanley, a future Prime Minister with ornithological interests. On 7 August that year Audubon wrote that the Rathbones, Roscoes and Hodgsons "have done more for me in every way than I can express."

A scheme of Hodgson and James John Hornby, rector of Winwick, to set up training for nurses in Liverpool, took place around 1829, and is documented in the correspondence and biography of Robert Southey. Southey corresponded with Hornby on "the plan of educating a better order of persons as nurses for the poor"; Hornby with Hodgson "hired a house, engaged a matron, received a number of inmates, and had educated and sent out some few as nurses." When it became clear that the nurses then went to work for the well-off, Hodgson and Hornby withdrew their support. Behind the idea lay the influence of Elizabeth Fry and Amelia Opie, who saw merit in diverting women's voluntary efforts from prison visiting to nursing.

In 1837 Hodgson gave figures on inhabited cellars in Liverpool, at the British Association meeting, prompted by a report of the Manchester Statistical Society. He gave a testimonial to Kitty Wilkinson (née Catherine Seward), from Caton, who provided a washing-place for Liverpool cellar-dwellers and passed into folklore (see Baths and wash houses in Britain). In 1841 he was elected to the Royal Statistical Society. The Liverpool branch of the Health of Towns Association was set up in 1845, and Hodgson became its chairman.

== Works ==
- Letters from North America: Written During a Tour in the United States and Canada (1824). These letters were first published in the Christian Observer in 1822–3. Remarks during a Journey through North America in the Years 1819, 1820, and 1821 (New York, 1823) was a pirated edition.

Hodgson's itinerary in North America, in 1819 to 1821, took him on a journey of 8000 miles through the US and Canada, staying in homes. Letters to England were later collected into a book in two volumes. This work has been seen, in the matter of indigenous populations, as a link between the thinking of Jedediah Morse in the US, and the Aborigines Protection Society in the UK. In terms of lifestyles, Hodgson claimed to have witnessed part of a stadial theory, that of Condorcet, in action. His travel from west to east struck him as a demonstration of the move towards commercial society. He also commented on the coupled pace of land clearing and human settlement.

Verdicts given by Hodgson were felt to have damaged the USA's reputation aboard. James Fenimore Cooper wrote his Notions of the Americans (1828) to counteract the impression given by Hodgson, and Basil Hall who had travelled in North America in 1827–8.

- А Letter to Jean Baptiste Say on the comparative expense of free and slave labour (1823)

Hodgson argued in the Letter that free labour is more productive than slave labour, and took self-hire by slaves to be a step towards emancipation. He quoted Adam Smith and others; in replying Jean-Baptiste Say stated he had shifted from the position Hodgson was attacking. The Letter was reprinted in Freedom's Journal in 1827. It was also mentioned by Charles Comte in volume IV of his Traité de législation, from the same year.

- A Letter to the Right Honorable Sir Robert Peel, bart., on the currency (1848)

Parliament reviewed the Bank Charter Act 1844, passed by Robert Peel's government, in the light of the Panic of 1847. Hodgson was taken to be a major figure of those who gave evidence to the 1848 secret committee on the matter. Henry Booth and the merchant William Pickering, along with Hodgson, defended the 1844 act, and were attacked as a group by a critic, James Harvey. On the other hand, Hodgson regarded the Panic as a narrow escape from disaster.

== Family ==
Hodgson in 1825 married Emily Catherine Champneys, daughter of Rev. Henry William Champneys. They had 13 children. The third child and second son, Adam Henry Hodgson (died 1906), graduated B.A. at Trinity College, Cambridge in 1848, and went into the church.
