= Crook o' Lune =

Bend of the River Lune in England

Coordinates: 54.075°N 2.733°W

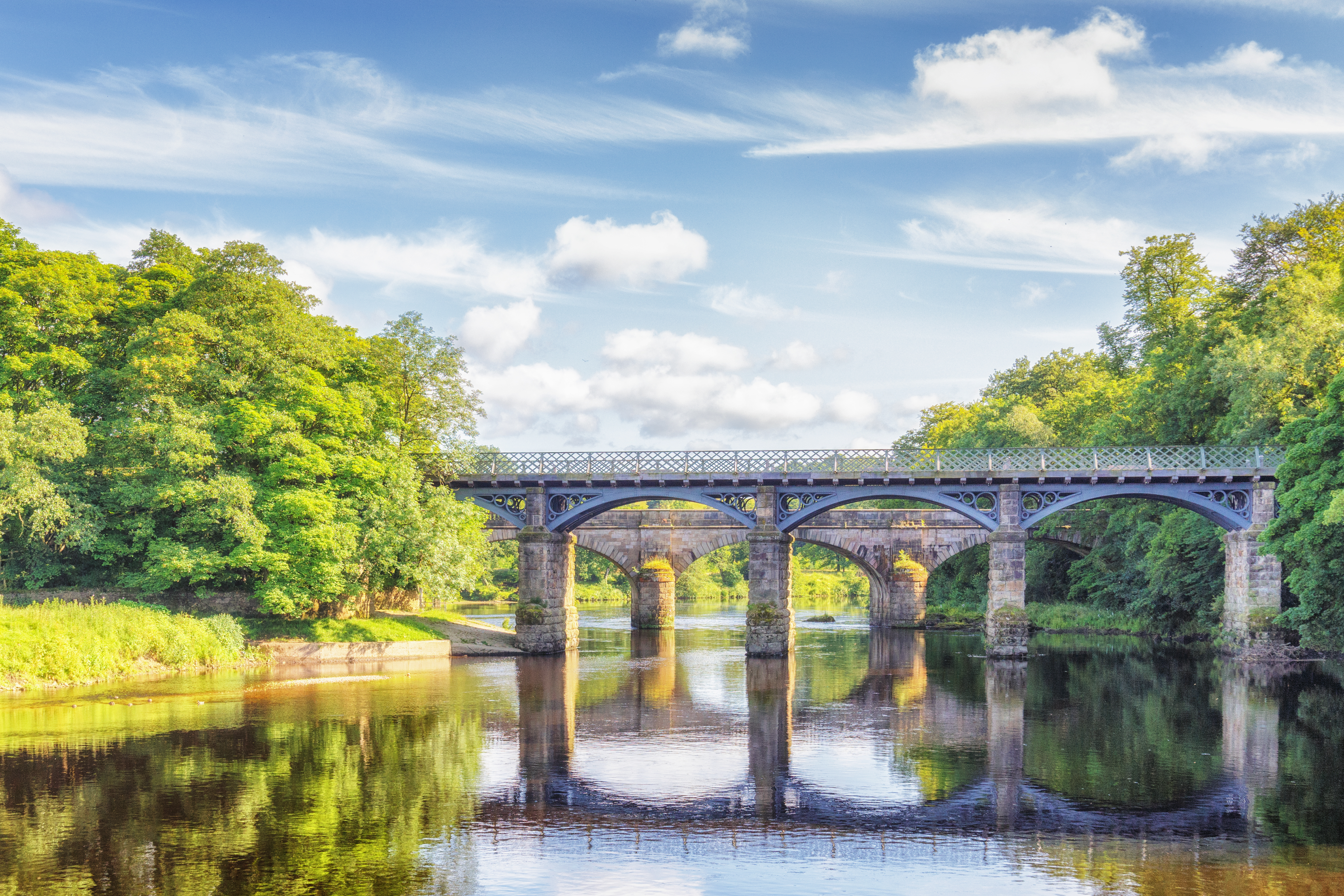
The Crook o' Lune, with the eastern viaduct in the middle distance and the road bridge in the far distance

The Crook o' Lune or Crook of Lune, about 3 mi (4.8 km) north-east of Lancaster, Lancashire, is a horseshoe bend of the River Lune, which here meanders through meadows and low hills into a wooded gorge. It has long been noted for its views eastward up the Lune valley to Hornby Castle and, in the far distance, Ingleborough and other Pennine fells. It was painted by J. M. W. Turner and its scenic attractions were celebrated by such writers as Thomas Gray and William Wordsworth. In recent years the Sunday Times has claimed that it "rivals the beauty of the Lake District". It lies within the Forest of Bowland Area of Outstanding Natural Beauty and the Lune Millennium Park. The river is crossed here by two former railway viaducts (now pedestrian bridges) and one road bridge, all being Grade II listed buildings.

The Lancashire Crook o' Lune is not to be confused with the Crook of Lune near Lowgill in Cumbria, a similar bend of the same river.

== Footpaths and facilities ==
The Crook o' Lune is a popular attraction for walkers, being served by public footpaths running upstream and downstream along both banks of the River Lune. The Lune Millennium Cycleway, which follows the course of a disused railway, connects the Crook o' Lune with Lancaster to the south-west and Caton to the east. A concessionary footpath leads up the south bank to Gray's Seat, a notable viewpoint.

Facilities include a car park, cafe, picnic site, and public toilets, and an hotel and caravan park stand close by. The A683 connects the Crook o' Lune with Lancaster and the M6.

== Bridges ==
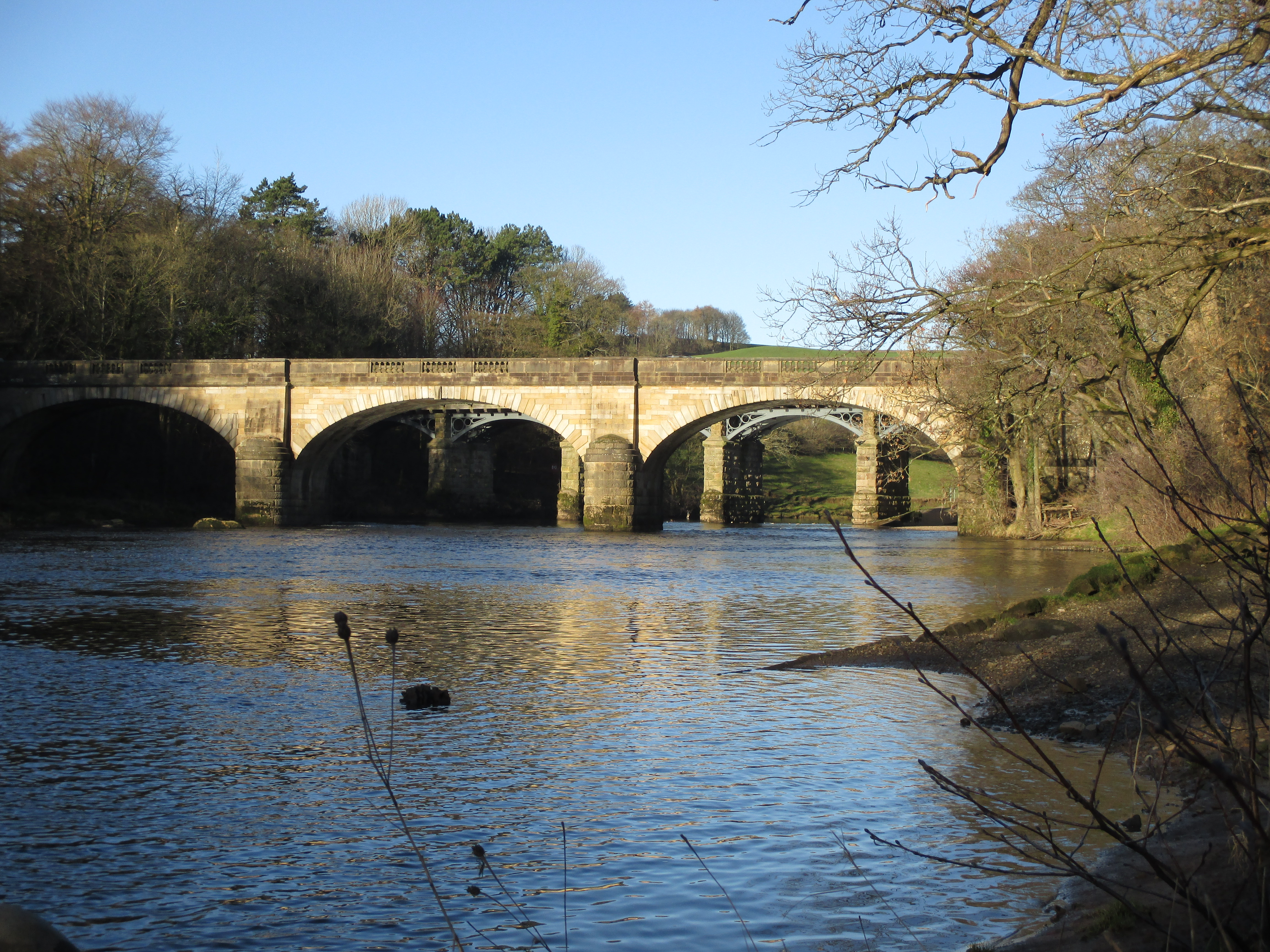
The road bridge, and behind it the eastern viaduct

The Crook o' Lune is crossed by two viaducts built to carry the "Little" North Western Railway over the river. The West Viaduct has six spans and the East Viaduct five; both are now Grade II listed buildings. Built in 1849, probably to designs by Edmund Sharpe, they originally carried only one track but were modified in 1882 when a second track was added to the line. The railway was closed in 1967 as part of the Beeching cuts, and has since been converted into a long-distance footpath and cycleway. The West Viaduct underwent a major repair and refurbishment in 2005, and the East Viaduct in 2013.

The river is also crossed at the Crook o' Lune by a road bridge, the Caton Lune Bridge, a Grade II listed building. The first road bridge on this spot was built by private enterprise in 1806 and, because of the toll charged, became known as the Penny Bridge. It had three arches and was built of stone, but did not prove so durable as might have been hoped, for in 1880 it became clear that structural damage would make the building of a replacement necessary. This, the present Caton Lune Bridge, was completed in 1883 using sandstone ashlar, again to a three-arch design.

== Flora and fauna ==
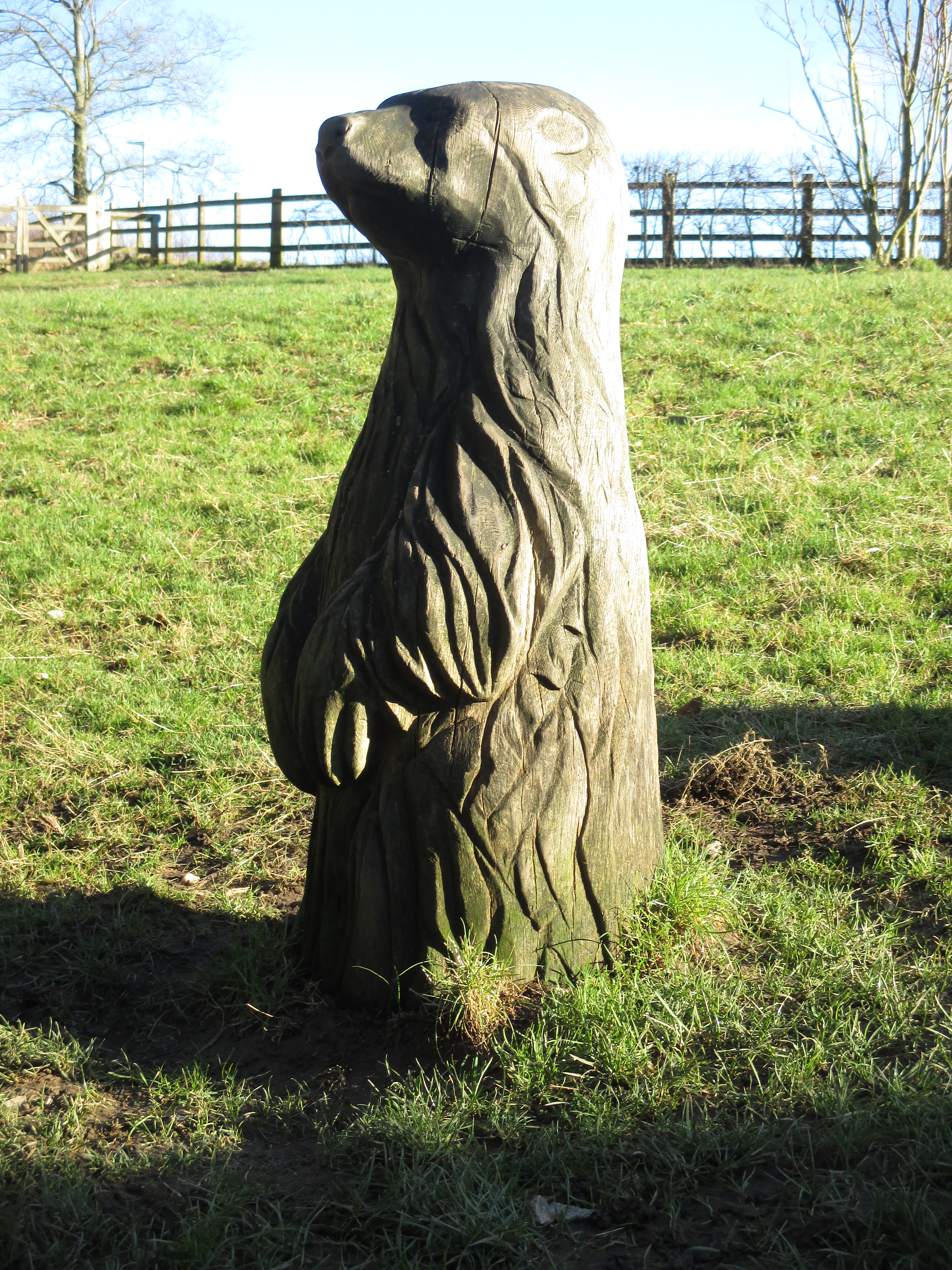
An otter sculpture by the riverside

The western stretches of the Crook o' Lune are well wooded both to the north and to the south of the river. Recently this woodland has been augmented by the planting of a "memorial forest" at Hermitage Field. Land has also been set aside for the creation of a wildflower meadow, along with native species of tree such as oak, wild cherry, hawthorn and holly. Bluebells and wild garlic can be seen in this district, and also non-native plants such as the colourful Himalayan balsam and the highly invasive Japanese knotweed.

The Crook o' Lune is famous for its fly fishing, being a habitat for brown trout, rainbow trout and salmon. Otters can also be seen here, and it is said to be a good place for spotting kingfishers.

== Queen's Well ==
Near the south bank of the Crook o' Lune is an ancient well called Queen's Well in the privately owned Quernmore Park. Local traditions have variously associated it with Edward I's wife, Eleanor of Castile and with Mary, Queen of Scots, claiming that the latter rested there while journeying to or from Bolton Castle, one of her places of imprisonment. This story inspired a poem, "Queen Marie's Well", by Henry Chorley. A third queen, Elizabeth I, is said locally to have visited the Crook o' Lune in the course of one of her royal progresses and to have declared that the view was one of the finest in her kingdom.

== In literature ==
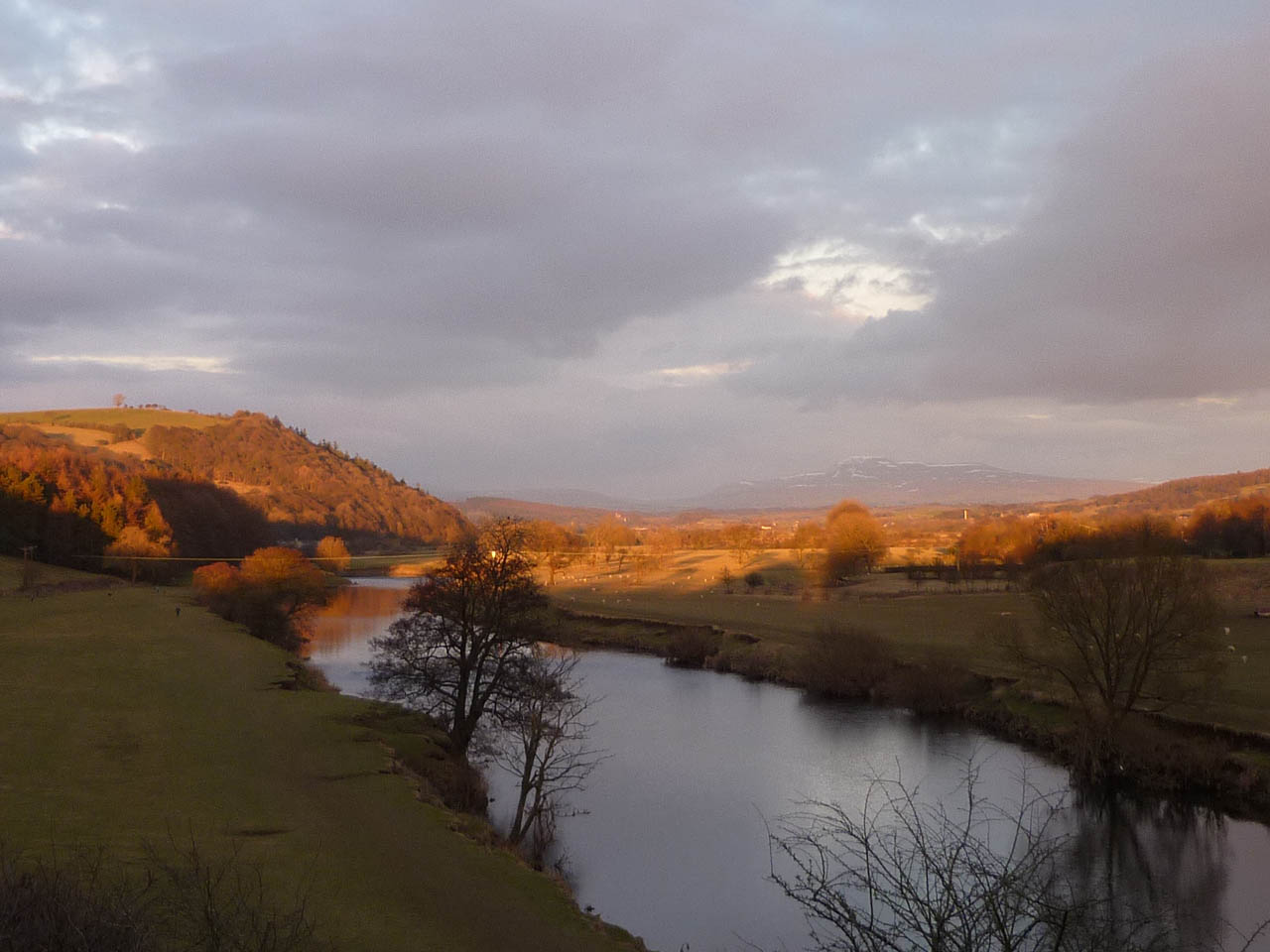
The view eastward at sunset, with Ingleborough in the far distance

The natural beauty of the Crook o' Lune was admired by 18th-century visitors. Visiting the district in 1769, Thomas Gray described in a letter the "rich and beautiful enclosed country", with "the river Lune winding in a deep valley, its hanging banks clothed with fine woods, through which you catch long reaches of the water, as the road winds about at a considerable height above it". His friend the poet William Mason considered the scene at length:

To see the view in perfection, you must go into a field on the left. Here Ingleborough, behind a variety of lesser mountains, makes the back-ground of the prospect: on each hand of the middle distance, rise two sloping hills; the left clothed with thick woods, the right with variegated rock and herbage: between them, in the richest of valleys, the Lune serpentizes for many a mile, and comes forth ample and clear, through a well-wooded and richly pastured fore-ground. Every feature which constitutes a perfect landscape of the extensive sort, is here not only boldly marked, but also in its best position.

In 1779 the young William Wilberforce noted in his diary that the view at Crook o' Lune was "the finest of the kind I ever beheld". He described the scene as

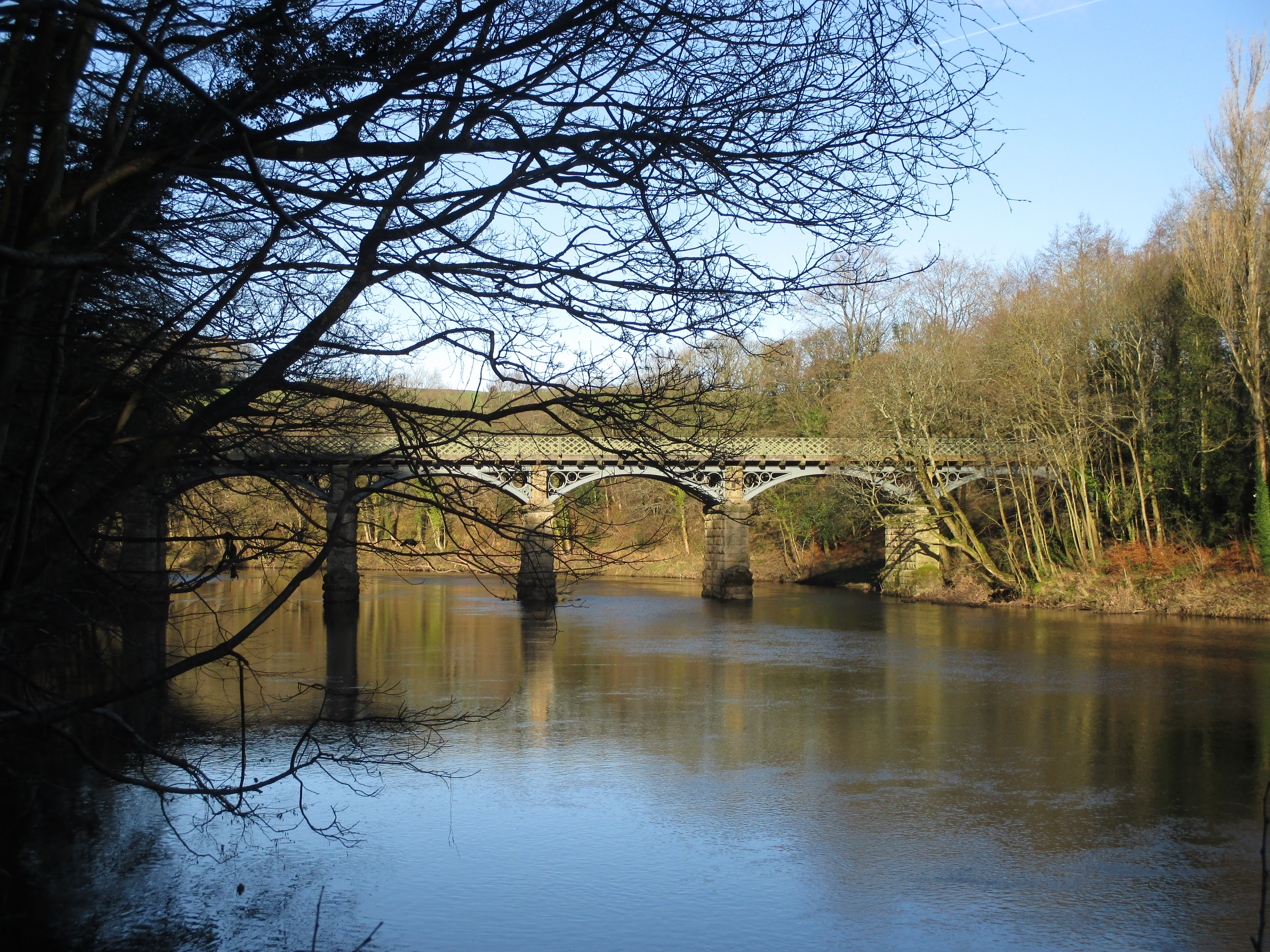
The western viaduct

An exceedingly rich cultivated Valley in which Villages & Gentlemen’s Seats are everywhere visible sufficiently to give the View an air of Population. Through it winds the Lune fringed with wood on both sides & edged with meadows at intervals. 2 planted hills just not opposite to each other close the side near you & at the distance of 19 miles reposes Ingleborough, a complete background to the Picture, and the Interval the Mind fills up (if the Eye be not powerful enough to ascertain) with Ideas of pastoral riches, grandees and population. It is worth while to stay a day at Lancaster to see this View to advantage.

The topographical writer Thomas Dunham Whitaker believed that here

the character of the vale of Lune, as one of the first of northern valleys, is instantly and incontrovertibly established. The noble windings of the river, the fruitful alluvial lands on its banks, the woody and cultivated ridge which bounds it on the north-west, the striking feature of Hornby Castle in front, and, above all, the noble form of Ingleborough, certainly compose an assemblage not united in any rival scenery in the kingdom.

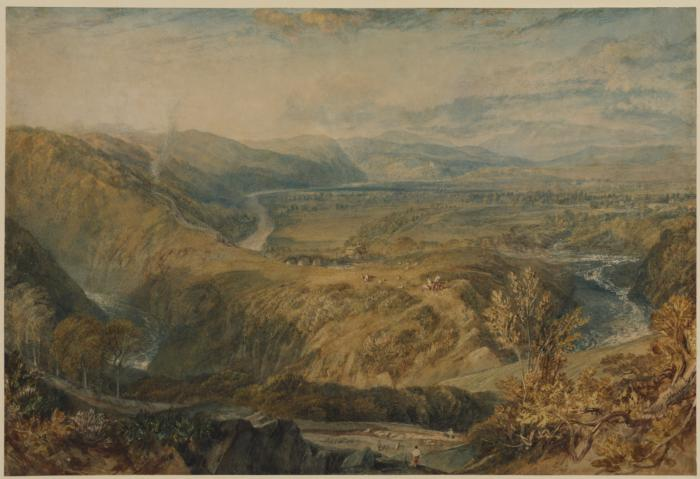
J. M. W. Turner Crook of Lune, looking towards Hornby Castle, c. 1818 (Courtauld Gallery, London)

In the later 18th century and early 19th century, travel books such as Thomas West's A Guide to the Lakes...in Cumberland, Westmorland and Lancashire (1778), Ann Radcliffe's A Journey Made in the Summer of 1794 (1795) and William Wordsworth's Guide to the Lakes (3rd ed., 1822) helped to establish the Crook o' Lune's popularity as a tourist attraction.

== In art ==
Around 1817 or 1818 J. M. W. Turner produced his watercolour Crook of Lune, looking towards Hornby Castle, capturing a view seen from the same "station" that Gray had used in the previous century but altering the topography of the scene for artistic effect. It has been called "one of the grandest and loveliest panoramas that Turner ever created". An engraving of it was taken by John Wykeham Archer and published in Thomas Dunham Whitaker's History of Richmondshire.

The Crook o' Lune was also the subject of watercolours by S. J. "Lamorna" Birch and Reginald Aspinwall, and of paintings in oils by Arthur Henry Knighton-Hammond and William Hoggatt.
