= Listed buildings in Caton-with-Littledale =

Caton-with-Littledale is a civil parish in Lancaster, Lancashire, England. It contains 53 listed buildings that are recorded in the National Heritage List for England. Of these, two are listed at Grade II*, the middle grade, and the others are at Grade II. The parish contains the villages and smaller settlements of Caton, Brookhouse, Littledale, Caton Green, and Crossgill. It is otherwise rural, with a number of isolated farms. Many of the listed buildings are houses and associated structures in the settlements and in the surrounding countryside. The other listed buildings include a church, disused chapels, a cross base, bridges, two former mills, and two milestones.

== Key ==
Grade	Criteria
II*	Particularly important buildings of more than special interest
II	Buildings of special interest

== Buildings ==
Name and location	Photograph	Date	Notes	Grade
Cross base 54.05948°N 2.68386°W	—	Medieval (probable)	The cross base is in sandstone and has a rectangular plan. On the base is a rectangular socket for the cross, which is no longer present.	II
St Paul's Church; 54.07533°N 2.70123°W		16th century (probable)	The oldest substantial part of the church is the tower, the rest of the church being rebuilt in 1865–67 by E. G. Paley. It is built in sandstone with a slate roof, and consists of a nave with a clerestory, aisles, a south porch, a north transept, a chancel, and a west tower. The tower is Perpendicular in style and has three stages. It is buttressed, and has an embattled parapet. In the north aisle is a blocked Norman doorway with a decorative tympanum, and the doorway is filled with medieval items.	II*
Greenfield Cottage, (facing northeast); 54.07466°N 2.71925°W	—	Late 17th century	A stone house with a slate roof, in two storeys with an attic. Originally in two bays, an additional bay was added to the right. The windows are mullioned, although some mullions have been lost. The doorway has a chamfered surround.	II
Hawkshead Farmhouse and barn 54.06081°N 2.71070°W	—	Late 17th century	The house and attached barn are in sandstone with a roof of slate and stone-slate. The house has two storeys and attics. The windows are mullioned, and on the front is a porch. The barn has a wide entrance with a segmental head, and a doorway with a re-set lintel inscribed with the date 1678.	II
Intack House and barn 54.05347°N 2.70771°W	—	Late 17th century	The house and attached barn are in sandstone with a stone-slate roof. The house has two storeys and contains mullioned windows of various sizes. The barn has a wide entrance with a segmental head. Inside the house, the upper floor contains a central upper cruck truss.	II
Mary Bank Farmhouse; 54.08141°N 2.68884°W	—	Late 17th century	The farmhouse was altered in the 18th and 19th centuries. It is in sandstone with a stone-slate roof, in two storeys and three bays. Some windows are sashes, and others have mullions. Above the doorway the lintel has a shaped design including initials and the date.	II
Moorside Cottage; 54.07485°N 2.70079°W		Late 17th century	A house in stone with a roof partly slated and partly tiled. It has two storeys and two bays. The windows were originally mullioned, but some mullions have been lost.	II
Pott Yeats Farmhouse; 54.05471°N 2.69031°W	—	Late 17th century	The farmhouse, which was altered in the 19th century, is in sandstone with a stone-slate roof, and has a T-shaped plan. There are two storeys with attics, and the house is in two parallel ranges. The older north range has two bays, and the later wing is dated 1856. The windows are sashes.	II
Ravenscar Farmhouse and farm buildings 54.06325°N 2.69764°W	—	Late 17th century	The farmhouse is in pebbledashed stone with a stone-slate roof. It has two storeys, and on the east side are two projecting single-storey wings. Between the wings is a porch, and in the right wing is a doorway with an embattled inscribed lintel. Some of the windows have retained their mullions. The house is flanked by barns.	II
Deep Clough Farmhouse and barn 54.05520°N 2.64059°W	—	1679	The house and attached barn are built in rubble with a stone-slate roof. The house has two storeys, four bays, and mullioned windows. There is a doorway with a moulded surround and a battlemented and inscribed lintel. The barn has a large entrance with a segmental arch, a window and a doorway.	II
Greenfield Cottage (facing southeast); 54.07458°N 2.71929°W	—	1680	A house in sandstone rubble with a slate roof. It has two storeys and two bays. In the centre are paired doorways, one with an inscribed lintel. The ground floor windows are mullioned, and the upper floor windows are mullioned and transomed.	II
Crossgill Farmhouse; 54.05544°N 2.67708°W		1681	The house is pebbledashed with a stone-slate roof. It is in two storeys and has a three-bay front. The windows were mullioned but only one mullion remains. Above the central doorway is a battlemented lintel inscribed with initials and the date, and over this is a blank niche.	II
1 and 2 New Street, Brookhouse; 54.07482°N 2.70163°W		1683	Originally one, house, later divided into two, the building is sandstone with a stone-slate roof. There are two storeys, and each house has a two-bay front. No. 1 has modem windows. The windows in No. 2 are sashes, and above the doorway is a battlemented lintel inscribed with initials and the date.	II
Ash House; 54.07788°N 2.71687°W	—	1683	The stone house, which was altered in the 18th century, has a stone-slate roof. It is in two storeys with attics and has a three-bay front. The windows are sashes, and there are traces of blocked mullioned windows. Above the doorway is a shaped lintel inscribed with the date.	II
Farm building, Dale Side; 54.04496°N 2.67515°W	—	1685	The farm building originated as a house. It is in sandstone with a corrugated asbestos roof, it is in two storeys, and has a projecting wing to the north. The windows were mullioned, and some mullions remain. There is a doorway with a moulded surround and an embattled and inscribed lintel.	II
Old Hall Farmhouse; 54.07387°N 2.70177°W		1685	A stone house with a stone-slate roof, in two storeys. The doorway has a moulded surround and an inscribed shaped lintel. Most of the windows are sashes, and some are mullioned.	II
Bell Farmhouse; 54.08093°N 2.68422°W	—	1690	A stone house with a slate roof, in two storeys. There is a 20th-century addition to the right, and a lean-to extension on the north side. The windows are mullioned, but some mullions have been lost. The doorway has a moulded surround and an embattled and inscribed lintel.	II
Old Post Cottage; 54.07602°N 2.72093°W	—	1692	A pebbledashed stone house with a slate roof, it is in two storeys and three bays. The windows are mullioned. The doorway has a chamfered surround, and a battlemented lintel inscribed with initials and the date.	II
The Nook; 54.06601°N 2.71766°W	—	1697	A sandstone house with a stone-slate roof, in two storeys with an attic and a three-bay front. Some of the windows are sashes, and others are mullioned. On the front is a central porch, and above the doorway is an inscribed battlemented lintel.	II
Brookhouse Old Hall; 54.07492°N 2.70289°W		1713	The house is in stone with a slate roof, and has three storeys. Originally in two bays, a third bay was added to the left. Above the door is an inscribed battlemented lintel. Some of the windows are mullioned, some are sashes, and other are modern replacements. At the rear is an outshut.	II
Rose Cottage; 54.07581°N 2.71885°W	—	1715	A stone house with a stone-slate roof, in two storeys and two bays. The doorway is in the right bay, it has a moulded surround, and an inscribed lintel. The windows have plain surrounds, and were originally mullioned.	II
5 Sunny Bank, Brookhouse; 54.07462°N 2.70145°W		1717	This is a sandstone house with a tiled roof in two storeys. Some of the windows are mullioned; others are modern restorations or replacements. The doorway has a moulded surround, and a battlemented and inscribed lintel.	II
Bellhill Farmhouse; 54.04744°N 2.67758°W	—	Early 18th century (possible)	The farmhouse contains some 17th-century fabric. It is in sandstone with a stone-slate roof, and has two storeys and three bays. The windows are mullioned. The doorway has a moulded surround, and a lintel that is battlemented, and inscribed with initials and the date 1684.	II
Caton Green Farmhouse; 54.07977°N 2.68978°W	—	1732	A sandstone farmhouse with a stone-slate roof, it has two storeys with cellars and an attic, and a three-bay front. The windows are mullioned. The central doorway is approached by four steps and has a moulded surround. Above it is an oval inscribed plaque.	II
Wall and gate piers, Caton Green Farmhouse; 54.07987°N 2.68995°W	—	Early to mid 18th century	The sandstone wall encloses the garden of the farmhouse. It contains two gate piers in rusticated sandstone, each with a square plan and a moulded cornice. On the north side of each pier is a fluted Doric pilaster with a triglyph frieze.	II
The Cragg Farmhouse; 54.04998°N 2.69061°W		1736	The farmhouse is in sandstone with a stone-slate roof, and has two storeys with attics, and a four-bay front. The windows are mullioned. The doorway has an architrave, a pulvinated frieze, and a cornice. Above it is an inscribed oval plaque.	II
Barn, The Cragg Farm; 54.05000°N 2.69090°W		1744	The barn is in sandstone with a stone-slate roof. In the north face is a wide entrance with a segmental arch. In the northeast gable are two windows and a doorway, and above the doorway is an inscribed plaque. In the apex of the gable are an owl hole and pigeon holes. Inside the barn are re-used crucks.	II
Barn, Brookhouse Old Hall; 54.07475°N 2.70296°W		18th century (probable)	The barn and projecting stable wing are in sandstone with slate roofs. On each side of the barn is a wide opening with a segmental arch. In the stable wing are windows, round pitch holes and, in the apex of the gable, a lunette with pigeon holes.	II
Carr House; 54.05316°N 2.68804°W		Mid-18th century	The house is in sandstone with a stone-slate roof. It has two storeys and a two-bay front. The windows are mullioned, and in front of the doorway is a 20th-century gabled stone porch.	II
Church Hill; 54.07524°N 2.70192°W		Mid-18th century	A stone house with a stone-slate roof, with a plinth and chamfered quoins. It is in two storeys and has a symmetrical three-bay front. The doorway and windows have architraves, and the windows contain restored timber mullions.	II
Hawes House; 54.05628°N 2.66791°W		Mid-18th century	A sandstone house with a stone-slate roof, in two storeys and three bays. The windows are mullioned, and the doorway, which has been moved to the third bay, has a plain surround.	II
St Anne's Chapel; 54.05543°N 2.67531°W		1752–55	Originally a chapel of ease to St Paul's Church, it is now redundant and has been converted into a house. The building is in sandstone with a stone-slate roof, in one storey with a cellar, and it has a two-bay front. The windows have round heads and mullions, and above the central doorway, which is approached by five steps, are similar smaller windows. On the west gable is a bellcote.	II
Farrar House and barn 54.07578°N 2.71893°W	—	1780	A sandstone house with an adjoining barn, it has a stone-slate roof, and is in two storeys and two bays. The windows are mullioned. The doorway has a plain surround, and above it is an oval inscribed plaque. To the left is a barn with two windows and a wide entrance with a segmental arch.	II
Estate Mill, Gresgarth Hall; 54.06277°N 2.71649°W	—	1780	The mill was until 1815 a corn mill, in 1843 it was a threshing mill, later it was a saw mill, and then used as a workshop. It is built in sandstone and has a roof of slate and stone-slate. There are 2 1/2 storeys and a main part of three bays. It contains doorways, a loading bay converted into a window, and windows with Tudor arched heads. On the left side are external stone steps.	II
Spinning Mill, Low Mill; 54.07782°N 2.72403°W		1784	The mill originated as a spinning mill, and was largely rebuilt in 1838 following a fire, and has also been used for weaving. It has since been converted for domestic use. The mill is in sandstone with slate roofs. It has four storeys and attics, and a west front of ten bays. The entrance is in the central bay, at the top of which is a gabled attic dormer. At the right end is a round stair turret surmounted by a cast iron tank.	II
Willow Mill; 54.07384°N 2.71978°W	—	c. 1790	A former water mill, initially with a breastshot wheel, and later with a turbine. Originally it was a corn mill, and later a cotton mill. The building is in sandstone with an asbestos sheet roof, it has an L-shaped plan, and is in three storeys with an attic. It has been converted into flats and offices. At the east end of the north wing is a square chimney.	II
Artle Beck Bridge; 54.07394°N 2.71314°W	—	c. 1800	The bridge carries Brookhouse Road over the Artle Beck. It is in sandstone and consists of a single segmental arch with voussoirs. The bridge has a solid parapet with rounded copings.	II
Gresgarth Hall; 54.06371°N 2.71551°W	—	1802	A large house containing features of an earlier house on the site. It is built in sandstone with a slate roof in Gothic Revival style. In the centre of the entrance front is a three-storey porch with an embattled parapet and a turret. To the right is a projecting block, also embattled, and to the left is a projecting gabled bay with a cross-finial. The garden front has five bays, and at the rear is a bow window and a two-storey wing.	II*
Oak Cottage; 54.06475°N 2.72092°W		1819	A sandstone house with a stone-slate roof in 1 1/2 storeys and two bays. The windows and door have Gothick details, including pointed heads; the windows are modern casements. Above the door is an inscribed plaque. The eaves overhang and have a bargeboard carved with pendants.	II
Borwicks and barn 54.06976°N 2.71513°W	—	Early 19th century	The house and adjoining barn are in sandstone with a modern tiled roof. The house has two storeys and three bays. The windows and door have plain surrounds; the windows are sashes. Above the doorway is a date plaque. The barn has a large entrance with a segmental arch.	II
Greenfield House; 54.07465°N 2.71937°W	—	Early 19th century	A house built in rubble with sandstone dressings and a slate roof. It has two storeys and a symmetrical three-bay front. The door and windows have plain surrounds, and the windows are sashes.	II
Gresgarth Lodge; 54.06768°N 2.71925°W	—	Early 19th century	The lodge is in Gothick style, built in sandstone with an overhanging stone-slate roof and carved shaped bargeboards. It has 1 1/2 storeys, and two bays. There is a central gabled porch. The windows have pointed heads and contain Y-tracery.	II
Icehouse, Gresgarth Hall; 54.06188°N 2.71448°W	—	Early 19th century (probable)	The icehouse is constructed in sandstone and built into a hillside. Its doorway has a stone lintel above which is a small gable. The entrance passage leads to a rectangular chamber with a level floor and a barrel vault.	II
Croftlands; 54.07466°N 2.72519°W	—	1833	A house that was remodelled in Tudor Gothic style by George Webster. It is in sandstone ashlar with a stone-slate roof, and has two storeys and a symmetrical three-bay front. There are narrow octagonal corner turrets with finials and ogee caps. The windows are mullioned and transomed. Above the doorway is an inscribed plaque.	II
Caton Hall; 54.07569°N 2.72101°W	—	Early to mid 19th century	A sandstone house with a slate roof, in two storeys with attics, and with a deep plan. The north front has three bays and sash windows. The gables on the west front have attics with semicircular heads and keystones. The east front contains a Tuscan porch and two stair windows.	II
Moorgarth; 54.06940°N 2.69571°W		Early to mid 19th century	Originally built as a workhouse, and converted into a family house in about 1869 by E. G. Paley. It is in sandstone with a stone-slate roof, with two storeys, an attic and a cellar, and a seven-bay front. The windows are sashes, and in the seventh bay is a stained glass window. On the front is a three-bay porch, and the doorway has an architrave, a semicircular head, a keystone, and an impost band.	II
Littledale Free Church; 54.05366°N 2.66549°W		1849	This was built as a "free" church, and is now disused. It is in sandstone with a slate roof, and consists of a nave and a chancel without any division, and a gabled south porch with an inscribed plaque above the doorway. The east wall contains two lancet windows with a buttress between, and on the gable is a bellcote.	II
Littledale Hall; 54.05233°N 2.66323°W		Mid-19th century	A country house in the style of the 16th-17th century. It is in sandstone with a slate roof and has two storeys with attics. On the west front are three unequal gabled bays. The largest bay, on the left, is flanked by buttresses rising to finials, and it contains a two-storey canted bay window. The windows are mullioned or mullioned and transomed. The right bay contains a single-storey gabled porch.	II
Milestone; 54.07759°N 2.70986°W	—	19th century	The milestone is on the south side of the A683 road. It is in sandstone with a triangular plan and a sloping top. The top is inscribed "CATON", and the sides are inscribed with the distances in miles to Lancaster, Hornby, Kirkby Lonsdale, and Ingleton.	II
Milestone; 54.08416°N 2.68879°W	—	19th century	The milestone is on the southeast side of the A683 road. It is in sandstone with a triangular plan and a sloping top. The top is inscribed "CATON", and the sides are inscribed with the distances in miles to Lancaster, Hornby, Kirkby Lonsdale, and Ingleton.	II
Eastern railway bridge, Crook of Lune; 54.07636°N 2.73189°W		c. 1880	The bridge, crossing the River Lune, and now disused except as a footbridge, was built for the Midland Railway. It consists of five segmental iron arches, with piers and abutments in sandstone. In the spandrels of the arches are roundels, and the bridge has an iron lattice-work parapet. Timber beams support the deck.	II
Caton Lune Bridge; 54.07583°N 2.73165°W		1883	The bridge, designed by E. G. Paley replaced an earlier bridge that collapsed in 1881. It carries Low Road over the River Lune. The bridge is in sandstone and consists of three elliptical arches carrying a flat deck. It has rounded cutwaters, projecting voussoirs, and a balustraded parapet.	II
Fish stones 54.07581°N 2.72019°W	—	Uncertain	Three sandstone semicircular steps with flagged tops and rubble bases. They are said to have been used to display fish for sale.	II
