= Micah Barlow =

English first-class cricketer (1873-1936)

Personal information
- Full name: Micah Yates Barlow
- Born: 6 February 1873; Bury, Lancashire, England
- Died: 13 January 1936 (aged 62); Grange-over-Sands, Lancashire, England
- Batting: Unknown

Domestic team information
- Years: Team
- 1894: Oxford University

Career statistics
Competition	First-class
Matches	1
Runs scored	9
Batting average	4.50
100s/50s	–/–
Top score	6
Catches/stumpings	–/–
- Source: Cricinfo, 16 September 2019

Micah Yates Barlow (6 February 1873 – 13 January 1936) was an English first-class cricketer.

The son of Micah Barlow and his wife, Martha Mary Barlow, he was born at Bury in February 1873. He was educated at Harrow School, before going up to University College, Oxford. While studying at Oxford, he made a single appearance in first-class cricket for Oxford University against the Marylebone Cricket Club at Oxford in 1894. Batting twice in the match, he was dismissed in Oxford's first-innings for 3 runs by George Davidson, while in their second-innings he was dismissed for 6 runs by Walter Mead. He did not gain a cricket blue while at Oxford. Barlow later went into business and lived at Scarthwaite Country House at Caton-with-Littledale alongside his wife, Gladys, between 1917–26.

He died in January 1936 at Grange-over-Sands, Lancashire.
