= The Scarthwaite Hotel =

House in Lancashire, UK

Coordinates: 54.07319°N 2.73505°W

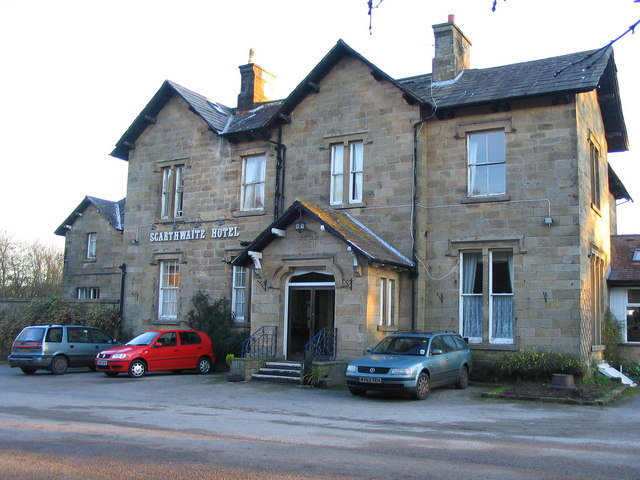
Scarthwaite Country House Hotel

The Scarthwaite Country House Hotel at Crook O’Lune near Caton in Lancashire is a house of historical significance. It was built in 1858 by Adam Hodgson, a merchant, banker and abolitionist. It was then the home of several notable people over the next century before being converted to a hotel. It still serves as a hotel which provides accommodation, restaurant facilities and caters for special events.

== The Hodgson family ==
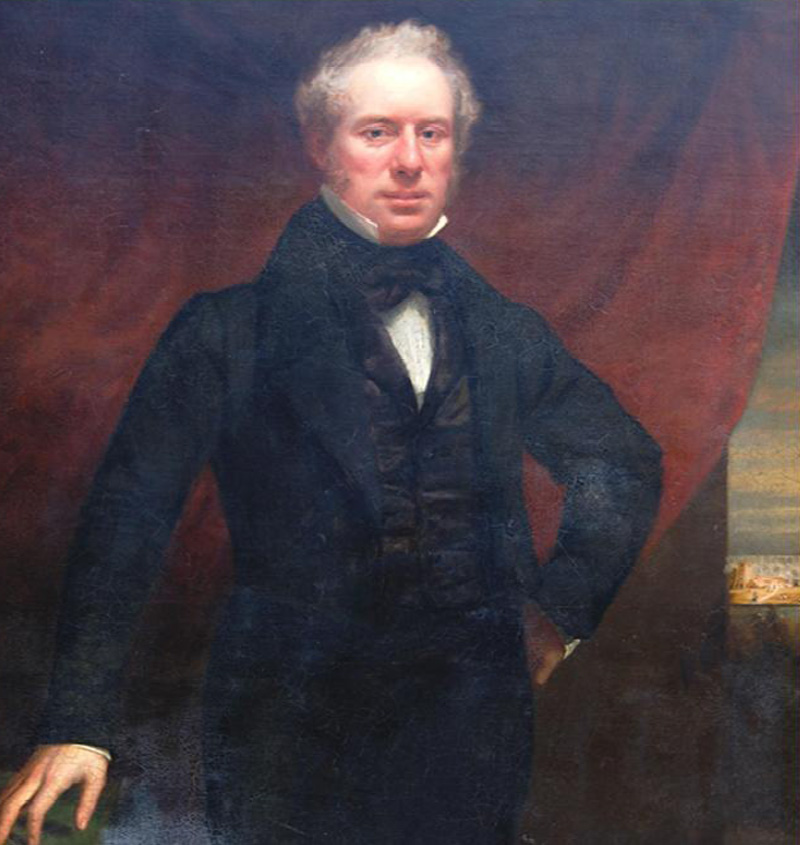
Adam Hodgson

Adam Hodgson (1789-1862) built Scarthwaite Country House with his wife Emily in 1858. Their initials are on the front entrance. Adam was born in 1789 in Liverpool. He became a partner in the mercantile firm Rathbone, Hodgson and Company. He later became a Director in the Bank of Liverpool and was prominent in Liverpool social and political affairs. He and James Cropper worked together for the abolition of slavery including economic arguments as well as ethical considerations in their pamphlets.

In 1825 he married Emily Catherine Champneys and the couple had thirteen children. Emily was the daughter of the Reverend Henry William Champneys of Ostenhanger in Kent. In 1858 he commissioned the Liverpool architect Henry P. Horner to build Scarthwaite House. He also hired the famous landscape architect Edward Kemp to design the garden. In his book on landscape architecture Kemp describes the Scarthwaite estate in the following terms.

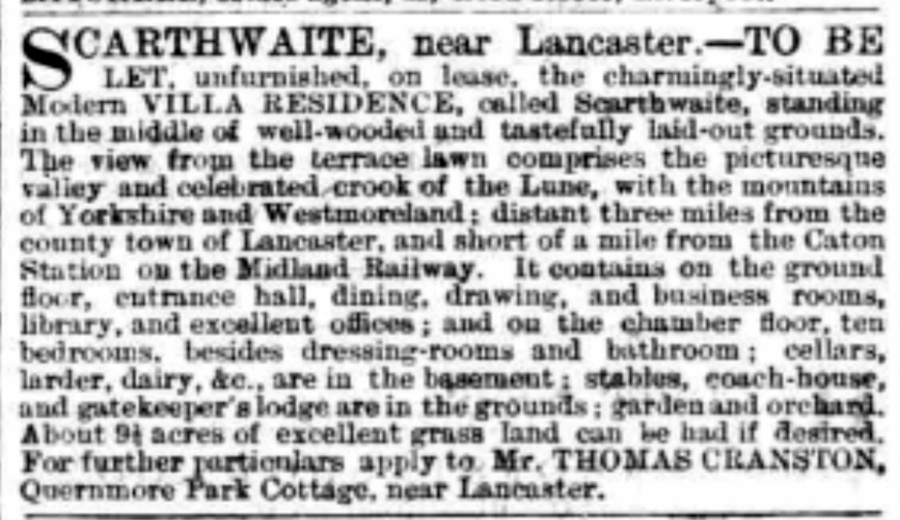
Rental notice for Scarthwaite 1877

"It is called Scarthwaite, and the house is planted on the spot which has been aptly described by the poet Gray as presenting "one of the best afternoon views in England." The site is an elevated platform, with a sudden crook in the river immediately below it, and a long winding stretch of river extending up the valley to the east, the valley being closed in at its head, by the highest of the Yorkshire hills — Ingleborough. To the south-east and south, there is a most picturesque and varied hill, partially clothed with woods, and always presenting the most striking diversity of colour. On the north side, within the estate, is a wooded eminence, scarred with rock, and broken by an old quarry. And the place has had the advantage, in the disposal of its woods, of artists no less distinguished than Mr. Gilpin and Sir John Nasmyth."

Adam died in 1862 and his wife Emily continued to live at the house until her death in 1875. The estate was then sold to the local landholder William Garnett (1851-1929) who owned Quernmore Park. He did not live at the house. Instead he rented it successively to wealthy tenants. The first rental advertisement which was in 1877 is shown.

== Later residents ==
One of the early tenants was Captain James Douglass Kennedy who lived there from about 1885 until 1897. He was born in 1845 in Manchester. He became an officer of the 4th Battalion Manchester Regiment. In 1869 he married Mary Elizabeth Miller who was the daughter of Henry Miller a wealthy cotton manufacturer of Preston. The couple had no children. They travelled extensively and many of their photograph albums are held by the John Rylands Library in Manchester.

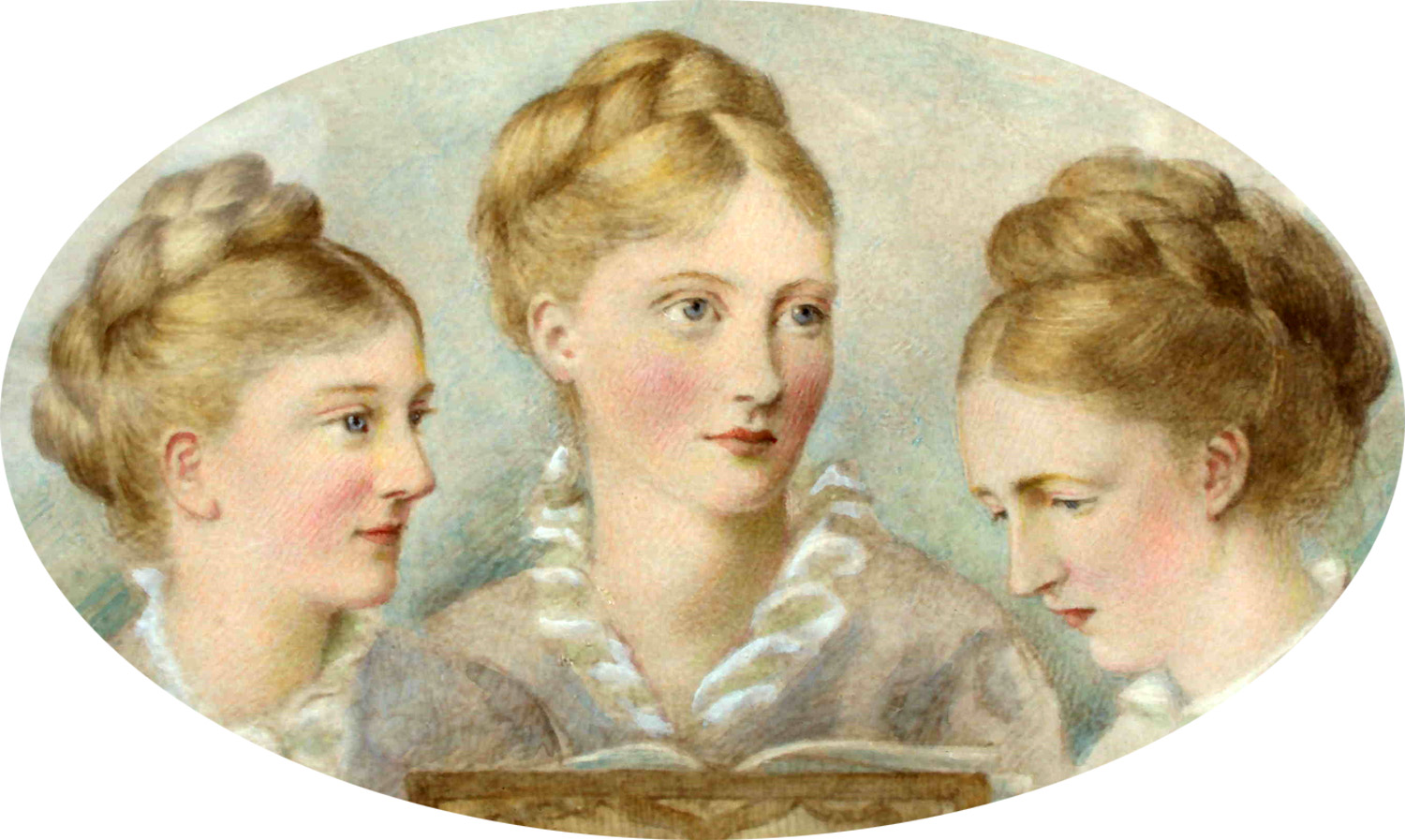
Emily, Margaret and Mary Paley

He died in 1897 and the house was let to the Paley family. In about 1902 Frances the widow of the famous architect Edward Graham Paley rented the house. She lived there with her three daughters. In 1903 she died and her daughters continued to rent the house until about 1917.

The three Paley sisters were Emily, Margaret and Mary. Their picture is shown. Emily Frances Paley (1852-1918) and Mary Elizabeth Paley (1856-1939) did not marry but their sister Margaret Paley (1854-1939) married in 1880 Francis Sharpe (1845-1899) who was the son of the famous architect Edmund Sharpe. Francis died in 1899 leaving Margaret a widow so she came to live with her family in Scarthwaite. The Paley sisters left Scarthwaite in about 1917 and went to live in Westmorland.

The next tenant was Micah Yates Barlow (1873-1936) who remained there with his wife Gladys until about 1926. After him Major Bernard Wardle rented the house with his wife Annie. He died in 1931 and Annie left Scarthwaite the following year.

In about 1940 Scarthwaite became a guest house. It later became a hotel and still serves this function today.
