= Rye Harbour =

Village near Rye, Sussex, England

Coordinates: 50.94°N 0.76°E

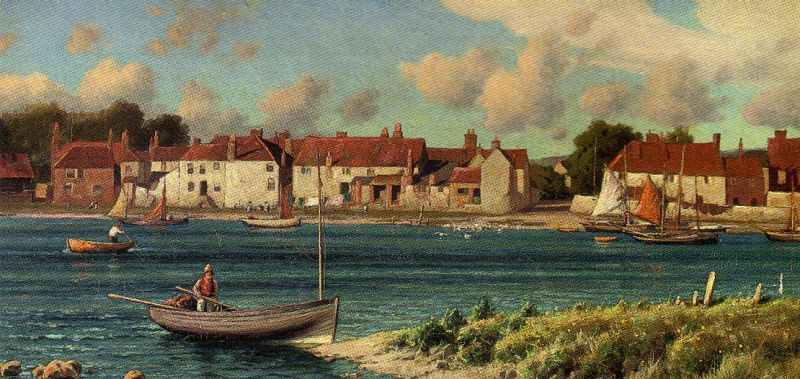
- Rye Harbour in 1898 by Reginald Aspinwall

- Location within East Sussex
- OS grid reference: TQ939191
  - London: 54 miles (87 km) NW
- Civil parish: Icklesham
- District: Rother
- Shire county: East Sussex
- Region: South East
- Country: England
- Sovereign state: United Kingdom
- Post town: RYE
- Postcode district: TN31
- Dialling code: 01797
- Police: Sussex
- Fire: East Sussex
- Ambulance: South East Coast
- UK Parliament: Hastings and Rye

Rye Harbour is a village located on the East Sussex coast in southeast England, near the estuary of the River Rother: it is part of the civil parish of Icklesham and the Rother district. Rye Harbour is located some two miles (3.2 km) downstream of the town of Rye.

The River Rother from Rye seawards, and including the village of Rye Harbour, is under the control of the Environment Agency. At the village itself there are yacht moorings; a small fishing fleet (coded RX: Rye SusseX); some commercial shipping; and a long-established lifeboat station. There is also a holiday village called Rye Harbour Holiday Park alongside the village itself.

An industrial estate straddles the road to Rye Harbour from Rye. It contains warehousing, light manufacturing and an oil refinery.

The village community has set up a pictorial website, aimed at promoting its history.

== History ==
Rye Harbour village dates from the early nineteenth century, having been built on an extension of the shingle beaches, progressively deposited by the sea over the last 800 years. These deposits limit access to the original open medieval port of Rye, now two miles (3 km) inland. The village has one of the chain of Martello Towers constructed during the Napoleonic Wars; it was built on the beachline of the time. The beachline has now advanced a further kilometre southward.

Its geography has thus been shaped by its position at the frontier with the sea and at the frontier of the United Kingdom.

The initial establishment was that of a company of dragoons in 1805, followed shortly after by the first fishermen's huts and the building of the Martello Tower (1809–10). As the Napoleonic wars ended so the smuggling trade which had long flourished all along the south coast again increased in scope and intensity, leading to the establishment of the Coast Blockade. A watch house was built about 1825 to provide shelter and support for the blockade detachments and still stands, complete with the flagstaff for signalling to shipping.

The harbour is also known for the tragedy of the Mary Stanford lifeboat. At 6:45 am on the morning of 15 November 1928, the Mary Stanford from the Rye Harbour RNLI station responded needlessly to a Latvian steamer in distress. The crew of the Mary Stanford did not know that the vessel had already been rescued by another lifeboat and, in heavy rain and seas, all of the seventeen-man crew of the Mary Stanford were drowned. The reason for this is still contested. The bodies of all but the Coxswain's son, John Head, were found and buried. A memorial service in honour of the Mary Stanford and its crew takes place every year in the village.

== Nature reserve ==
Rye Harbour Nature Reserve was established in 1970 and now receives 360,000 visitors a year. Managed by Sussex Wildlife Trust, it has national and international designations and is home to more than 300 rare or endangered species. The private road and birdwatching hides are ideal for wheelchair users.

In late May 2021, the Discovery Centre opened on Rye Harbour Nature Reserve. This is a new, wheelchair accessible visitor centre with educational facilities, information about the wildlife on the reserve, a calfé and shop, and is a joint project between Sussex Wildlife Trust and the Friends of Rye Harbour Nature Reserve.

== Cultural references ==
Rye Harbour is perhaps best known for its fictionalisation as "Westling" in the Romney Marsh children's books of Monica Edwards.

== Gallery ==
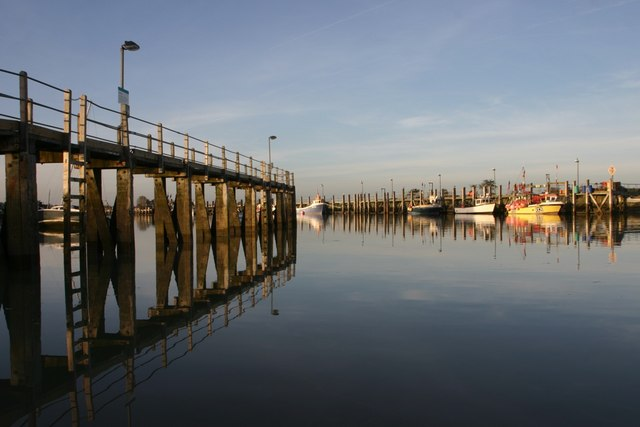
Rye Harbour View looking up the Rother from the slipway by the lifeboat house.

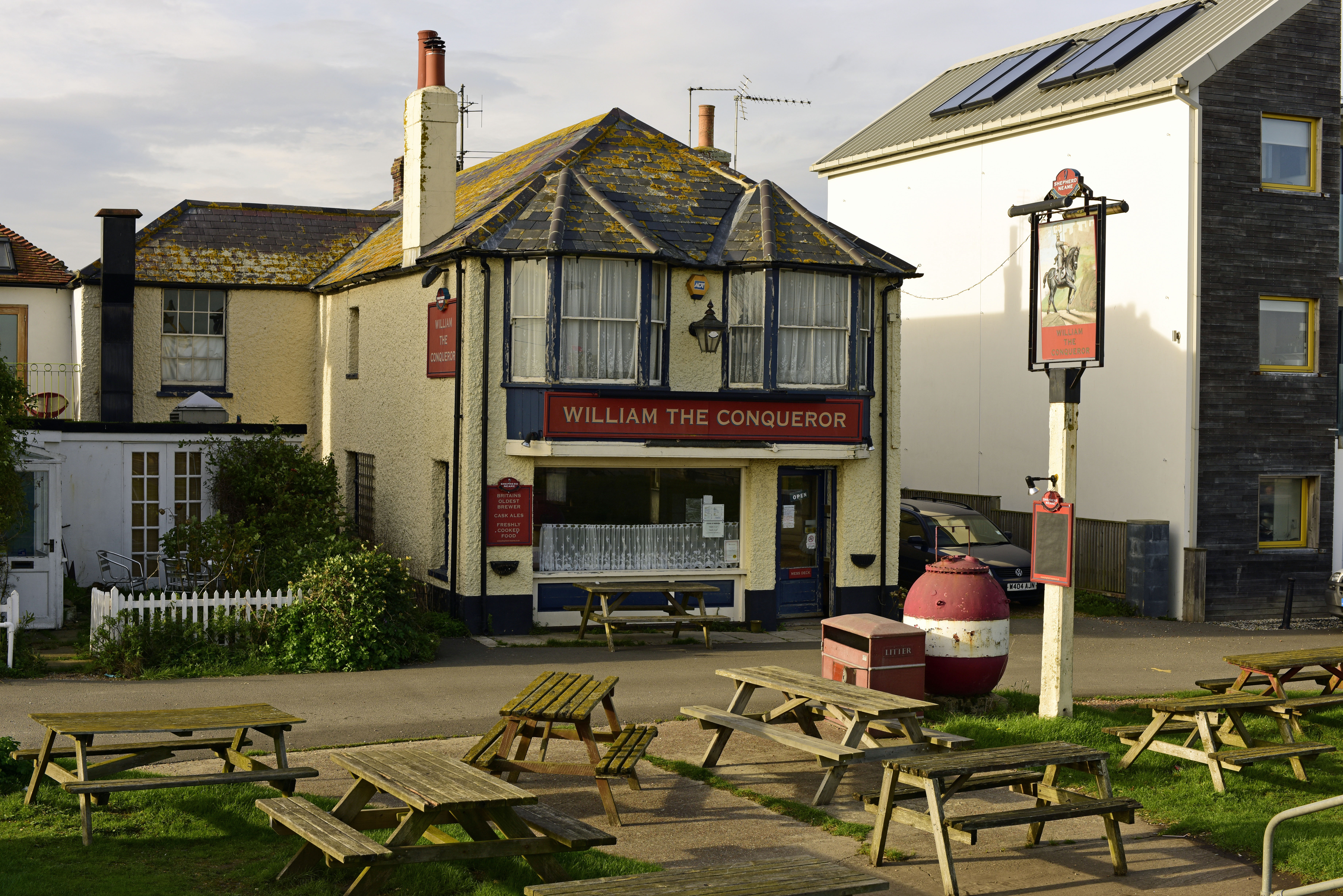
William the Conqueror Public House at Rye Harbour.

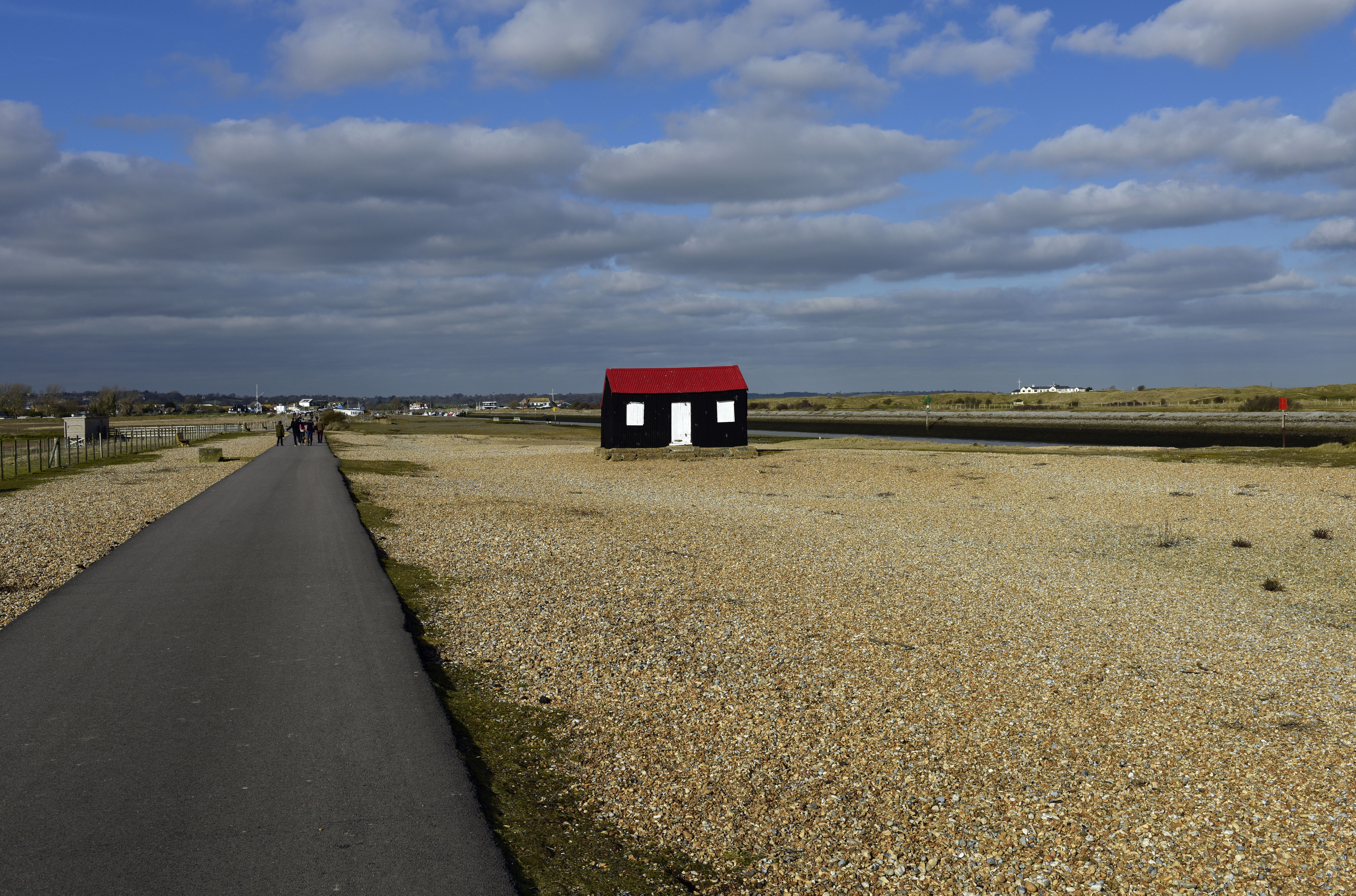
Rye Harbour nature reserve

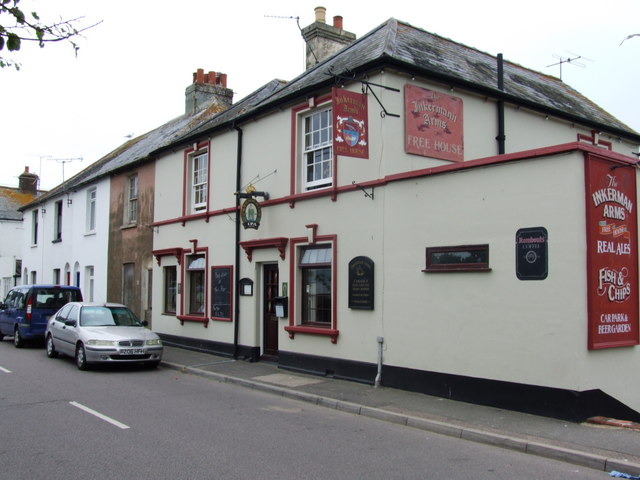
Inkerman Arms, Rye Harbour

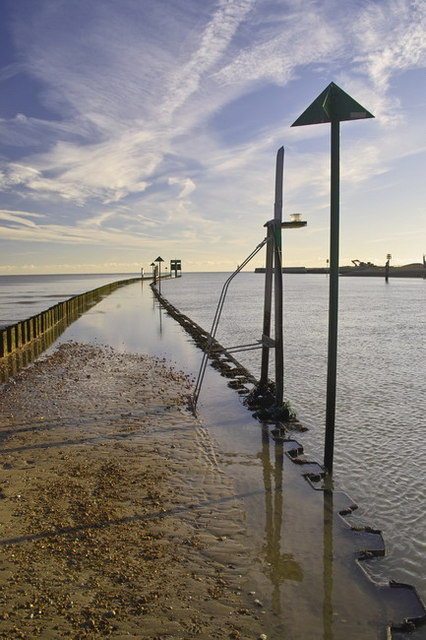
Rye Harbour Entrance

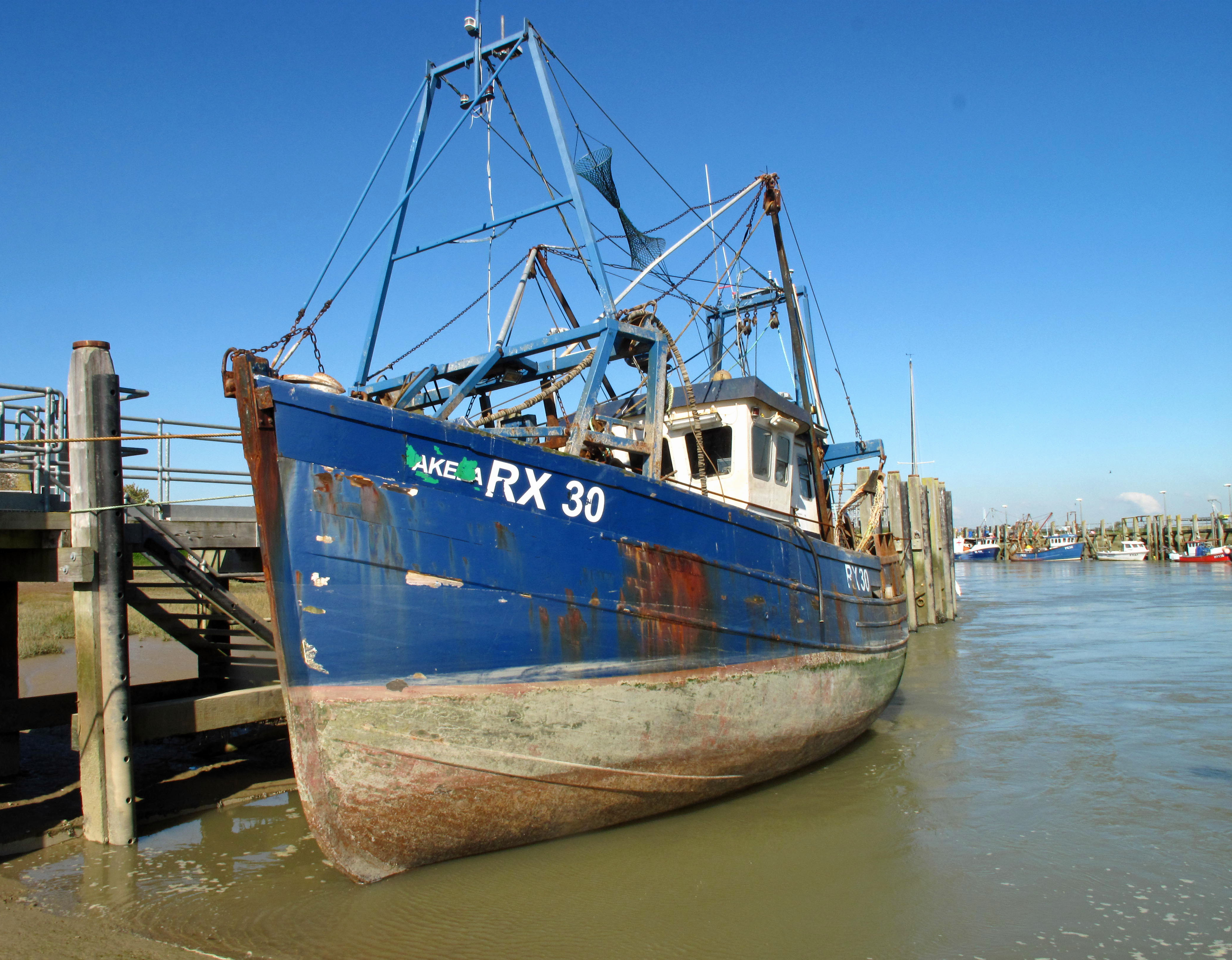
Fishing boat with the RX designation signifying Rye Harbour.
