= Kitty Wilkinson =

Irish migrant and public washhouse pioneer

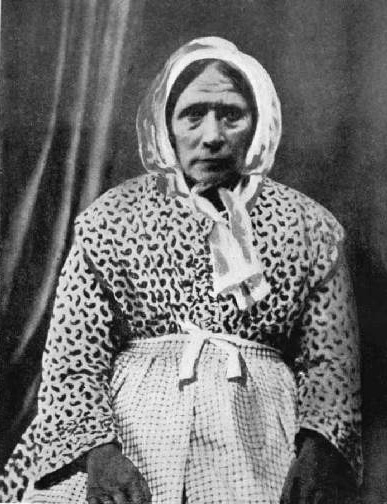
Kitty Wilkinson, portrait published in Memoir of Kitty Wilkinson, 1927.

Catherine ("Kitty") Wilkinson (née Seaward; 24 October 1785–11 November 1860) was an Irish migrant and "wife of a labourer", who became known as the 'Saint of the Slums' due to her pioneering the public wash house movement. In 1832, during a cholera epidemic, she had the only boiler in her neighbourhood, so she invited those with infected clothes or linens to use it, thus saving many lives. This was the first public washhouse in Liverpool. Ten years later with public funds, her efforts resulted in the opening of a combined washhouse and public baths, the first in the United Kingdom.

== Personal life ==
Wilkinson was born Catherine Seaward to a skilled working class family in Londonderry, northern Ireland on 24 October 1785. Her mother worked in spinning and lace-making, whilst her father's occupation is unknown. It is likely that he was a soldier. Wilkinson had a younger brother and sister.

The family set sail to migrate to Liverpool in February 1794, when Kitty was nine years old. During the passage, their ship's mast snapped in a severe storm and the vessel ran aground on Hoyle Bank at the mouth of the river Mersey. Wilkinson's father and younger sister died, leaving Mrs Seaward to arrive in Liverpool a widow with two young children.

At twelve years of age, Wilkinson went to work at a cotton mill in Caton, Lancashire, where she was an indentured apprentice. At age 20 she left the mill and returned to live with her mother in Liverpool, where they both were in domestic service. In 1812 she married a sailor, Emanuel Demontee, although her mother continued to live with her. After two children in quick succession, with her husband drowned at sea, she returned to domestic service but shortly thereafter, upon being gifted with a mangle, she set herself up as a laundress. In 1823, she married Thomas Wilkinson, a warehouse porter, and they continued to live at the Denison Street house that she rented.

== Crusade ==
In 1832, cholera broke out in Liverpool, part of the 1826–1837 cholera pandemic. Wilkinson took the initiative to offer the use of her boiler, house and yard to neighbours to wash their clothes, at a charge of 1 penny per week, and she showed them how to use a chloride of lime to get them clean. Boiling killed the cholera bacteria. Once these activities came to their attention, Wilkinson was supported by the District Provident Society and William Rathbone. Convinced of the importance of cleanliness in combating disease, she pushed for the establishment of public baths where the poor could bathe. In 1842, the combined public baths and washhouse was opened on Upper Frederick Street in Liverpool, and in 1846, Wilkinson was appointed superintendent of the public baths.

== Recognition and legacy ==
In 1846, the Mayor presented Wilkinson with a silver teapot from Queen Victoria, inscribed: "The Queen, the Queen Dowager, and the Ladies of Liverpool to Catherine Wilkinson, 1846." Wilkinson died in Liverpool and was buried in the St James Cemetery, with the inscription:

CATHERINE WILKINSON. Died 11 November 1860, aged 73. Indefatigable and self-denying She was the Widow's friend. The support of the Orphan. The fearless and unwearied nurse of the sick. The originator of Baths and Wash-houses for the poor. 'For all they did cast in of their abundance; but she of her want did cast in all that she had, even all her living.' St. Mark, 12th Chapter, 44th Verse.

Liverpool Hope University has a halls of residence building named after Kitty Wilkinson.

In 2012, a marble statue of Kitty Wilkinson was unveiled in St George's Hall.

The non-profit Kitty's Launderette, named after Wilkinson, opened in Everton in 2018.

In May 2017, students at the University of Liverpool voted to change one of the names of the rooms in the Liverpool Guild's building. After 1,400 votes, it was chosen to rename the room the Kitty Wilkinson room.

== Biographies ==
In 1910 The Life of Kitty Wilkinson was published by Winifred Rathbone which provided a more accurate story of her life than previously available in "Catherine of Liverpool" in Chambers' Miscellany.

A series of articles in 1972, published in Baths Service ‘The Journal of the Institute of Baths Management Incorporated’, argued that Kitty Wilkinson's life had become "a civic myth". John Dobie, a trained historian and a civil servant in the education system, drew on extensive primary material such as town council records to show that the first baths and wash-house opened in 1842, several years before the one which the Wilkinsons supervised, and that the legend of "Catherine of Liverpool" was built up over generations, starting with William Rathbone.

In 2000, a fuller biography, The Life of Kitty Wilkinson, was written by Liverpool author and civic historian Michael Kelly. Kelly also starred in a short documentary about Wilkinson's life, produced by a group of students at Edge Hill University in 2014, with the title Kitty: The Saint of the Slums.

== Sources ==
- Ashpitel, Arthur (1851), Observations on baths and wash-houses, pp. 2–14, JSTOR 60239734, OCLC 501833155
- Rathbone, Herbert R. (1927), Memoir of Kitty Wilkinson of Liverpool, 1786–1860: with a short account of Thomas Wilkinson, her husband, H. Young & Sons
- Kelly, Michael (2000), The Life of Kitty Wilkinson, archived from the original on 11 December 2014
