= Littledale Hall =

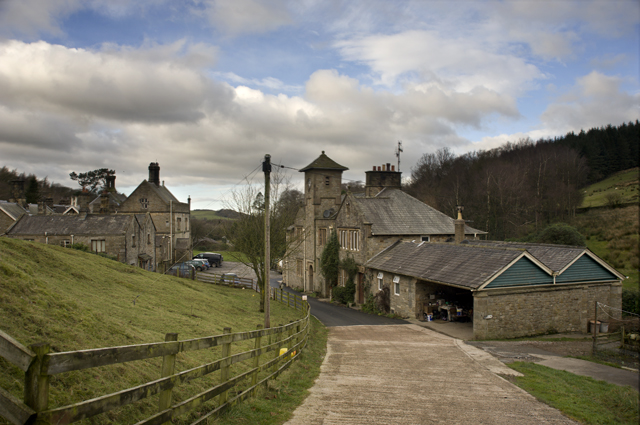

- Location within the City of Lancaster district

General information
- Type: Country house
- Architectural style: Gothic
- Location: Caton-with-Littledale, Lancashire, England
- Coordinates: 54.05235°N 2.66322°W
- Completed: 1849

Technical details
- Material: Sandstone with slate roofs

Design and construction
- Architect: attributed to E. G. Paley

Listed Building – Grade II
- Designated: 7 March 1985
- Reference no.: 1163923

Littledale Hall is a former country house in the civil parish of Caton-with-Littledale in Lancashire, England, some 10 miles (16 km) east of Lancaster. It is recorded in the National Heritage List for England as a designated Grade II listed building.

It dates from 1849 and, in the absence of documentary evidence, its design has been attributed on stylistic grounds to the Lancaster architect E. G. Paley. It is constructed in sandstone with slate roofs, and is in Gothic style.

== History ==
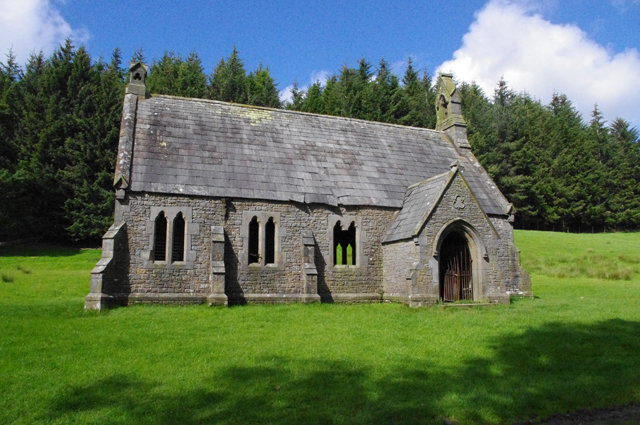
Littledale Free Church, built 1849 by Revd John Dodson

Littledale Hall was built in 1849 for Revd John Dodson, of a Liverpool shipping family. He had been vicar of Cockerham from 1835 to 1849, but seceded from the Established Church because of the Gorham judgement and retired with his family to Littledale. There he also built a Free Church in which he preached for thirty years, dying in Eastbourne in 1890. His eldest son John died at Littledale in 1851 at the age of 18.

The house became a Christian retreat in 1988 and a residential addiction treatment centre in 2006.

== See also ==
- Listed buildings in Caton-with-Littledale
