= T. Wildman & Sons =

Defunct textile industry toolmaker

- Company type: Bobbin maker
- Industry: Weaving
- Founded: 1859
- Defunct: 1973
- Headquarters: Copy Lane, Caton with Littledale, Lancashire, England

T. Wildman & Sons were an English company and specialists in the manufacture of bobbins for the textile industry. They manufactured a variety of shielded ring bobbins (twist and weft), tubes and pirns. The firm was established in 1859.

In 1872, Mr Thomas Wildman purchased Willow Mill, located at Copy Lane, Caton with Littledale, Lancashire, and the manufacturing was moved there.

With the decline of the textile industry, the mill moved to the manufacture of brushes, which was continued until the close of the mill in 1973. A part of the contents of the mill was donated to Lancashire County Council Museum Service.
