= Artle Beck =

River in Lancashire, England

Coordinates: 54°05′N 2°43′W

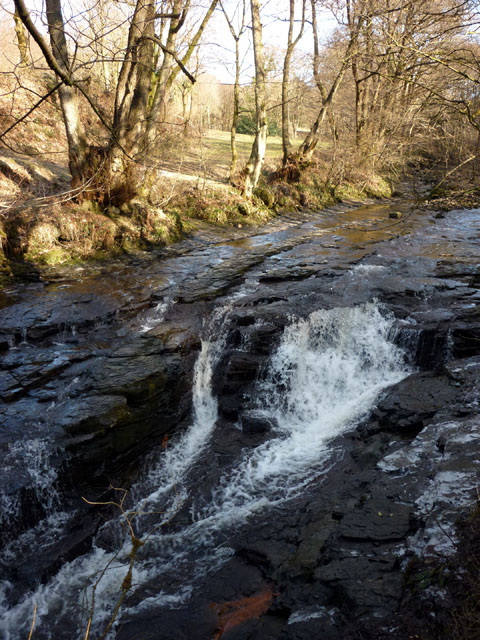
- Cascade on Artle Beck, Littledale

Location
- Country: United Kingdom
- Part: England

Artle Beck is a minor river of Lancashire, England.

Rising at the confluence of Udale Beck and Foxdale Beck below Fosdale Bridge and Udale Bridge near Crossgill, Artle Beck flows northwest through steep-sided woodland, passing beneath Raven Scar on its way to Gresgarth Hall.

From there, the beck continues north, skirting around the village of Caton before meeting the River Lune opposite Halton Park.

The beck is dammed at Gresgarth Hall and feeds a mill leat which runs separately through Caton. Two of the (originally three) mills are still standing but have been converted for other uses. The leat empties separately into the Lune at Low Mill about half a mile downstream from the mouth of Artle Beck itself.

== Tributaries ==
- Foxdale Beck commences at Foxdale Head at High Stephen's Head and flows northwest, being joined by Rushbed Gutter and Whitespout Gutter, draining the north side of Ward's Stone. The beck continues through Littledale, passing Littledale Hall, where it is joined by Ragill Beck (flowing down from Haylot Fell and fed by Closegill Beck), before continuing through Crossgill (and fed by Crossgill Beck), beneath which it passes under Fosdale Bridge to meet Udale Beck.
- Udale Beck rises on the Black Side of Ward's Stone, flowing north-by-northwest towards Blanch Fell, before moving northwest and picking up several tributaries, including Oval Syke, which emerges from a tarn high on Clougha. Continuing down Littledale, the beck is joined by Bellhill Clough near a ford and Sweet Beck. From there, Udale Beck travels northwards through woodland and under Udale Bridge, below which it joins Foxdale Beck.
