= Baths and wash houses in Britain =

Public baths in Britain

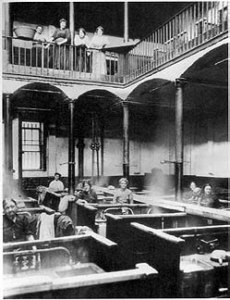
Interior of Frederick Street wash house, the first public wash house. Taken in 1914

Baths and wash houses available for public use in Britain were first established in Liverpool. St. George's Pier Head salt-water baths were opened in 1828 by the Corporation of Liverpool, with the first known warm fresh-water public wash house being opened in May 1842 on Frederick Street. Wash houses often combined aspects of public bathing and self-service laundry. The Romans, whom the Victorians often sought to emulate, had built many public baths (thermae) open to everyone, but these had long disappeared. For centuries Bath, Somerset, had retained its popularity as a health resort, while during the Georgian era and particularly after the development of the railway, entrepreneurs developed spa towns around the country, catering first to the aristocracy and then to the growing middle class. These commercial endeavours offered nothing for the working poor.

The popularity of wash-houses was spurred by the newspaper interest in Kitty Wilkinson, an Irish immigrant "wife of a labourer" who became known as the Saint of the Slums. In 1832, during a cholera epidemic, Wilkinson took the initiative to offer the use of her house and yard to neighbours to wash their clothes, at a charge of a penny per week, and showed them how to use a chloride of lime (bleach) to get them clean. She was supported by the District Provident Society and William Rathbone. In 1842 Wilkinson was appointed baths superintendent.

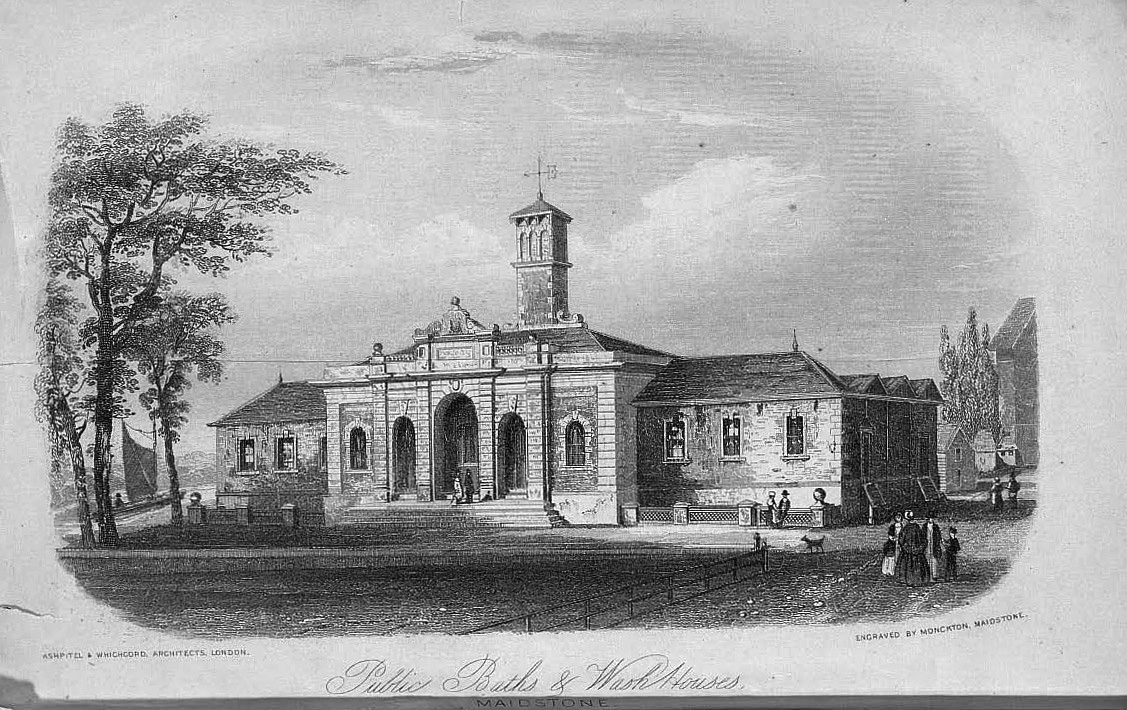
Illustration for Maidstone Baths opened May 1852

== Regulation ==
Public Baths and Washhouses Act 1846 (Note: The citation of this act by this short title was authorised by section 1 of, and the first schedule to, the Short Titles Act 1896. Due to the repeal of those provisions it is now authorised by section 19(2) of the Interpretation Act 1978.)
- Act of Parliament
- Parliament of the United Kingdom
- Long title: An Act to encourage the Establishment of public Baths and Wash-houses.
- Citation: 9 & 10 Vict. c. 74
- Territorial extent: England and Wales (Note: Section 1.)

Dates
- Royal assent: 26 August 1846
- Commencement: 26 August 1846 (Note: The Acts of Parliament (Commencement) Act 1793.)
- Repealed: 29 July 1960
Other legislation
Amended by	Baths and Washhouses Act 1847; Statute Law Revision Act 1875; Local Government Act 1933; Public Health Act 1936; Public Health (London) Act 1936
Repealed by	City of London (Various Powers) Act 1960

Status: Repealed

Text of statute as originally enacted

In 1844, the Committee for Promoting the Establishment of Baths and Wash-Houses for the Labouring Classes was formed with the Bishop of London as president. The Bishop petitioned for a bill for the regulation of public baths and in 1846 Sir George Gray introduced the bill which became the Public Baths and Washhouses Act 1846 (9 & 10 Vict. c. 74). This was the first legislation to empower British local authorities to fund the building of public baths and wash houses.

The act was intended to encourage cities to voluntarily build such facilities and was not mandatory. Manchester, for example, did not adopt the act until 1876; in the following year, it purchased two large, privately owned, facilities. By the late 19th century, the city had 30 bath houses.

== London baths ==
The first London public baths was opened at Goulston Square, Whitechapel, in 1847 with the Prince consort laying the foundation stone. The building was demolished in 1989 and the site re-used to build the Women's Library in 2001, which incorporates a faux wash house frontage (Facadism). A reasonably well-preserved bath house can be found in the Bathway Quarter in Woolwich, south east London.

== Timelines ==
First public wash houses in Liverpool
Wash house	Opening date
Pier Head	1828
Frederick Street	1842, rebuilt 1854
Paul Street	November 1846
Cornwallis Street	May 1851
Margaret Street	13 June 1863 with an extension in 1868
Steble Street	April 1874

Early public wash houses in London with building costs
Opening	Location	Original cost
1849	Marylebone	£23,671
1851	St. Margaret and St. John, Westminster	£15,000
1852	St. James', Westminster	£21,000
1852	Poplar	£11,500
1854	St. Giles and St. George, Bloomsbury	£20,857
1854	Bermondsey	£16,500
1855	St. George, Hanover Square	£33,861
1856	St. Martin's in the Fields	£21,000

Other bath and wash houses: The Wells and Campden Baths and Wash Houses 1888–1978, Hampstead Heath.

== See also ==
- Birmingham Baths Committee
- Self-service laundry
- Washerwoman

== Bibliography ==
- Ashpitel, Arthur (1851), Observations on baths and wash-houses, pp. 2–14, JSTOR 60239734, OCLC 501833155
- Metcalfe, Richard (1877), Sanitas Sanitatum et Omnia Sanitas, vol. 1, Co-operative printing company
- Low, Sampson (1850), The charities of London, OCLC 5362638
