= Caton Oak =

Tree in England

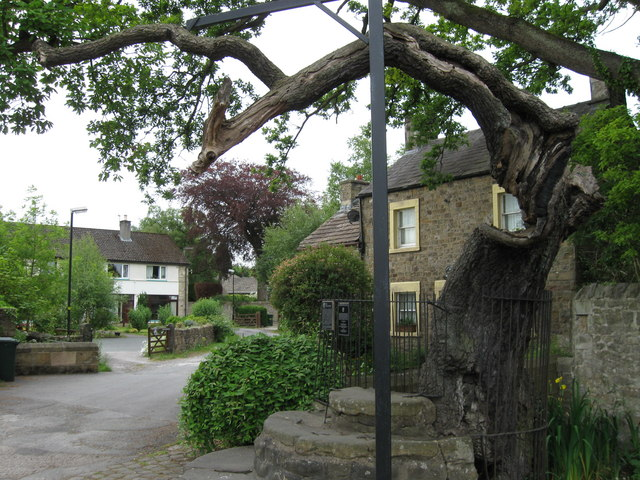
- Caton Oak and the Fish Stones. The metal support installed in 1998 can be seen in the foreground.
- Interactive map of Caton Oak
- Location: Caton, Lancashire
- Coordinates: 54.0758°N 2.7202°W
- Date felled: 20 June 2016

The Caton Oak (also known as the Druid's Oak) was an ancient oak tree that stood in Caton, Lancashire, reputedly dating from the time of the druids. The oak tree stood atop a set of steps known as the "Fish Stones" that were used by medieval monks to display salmon for sale. The tree declined during the 20th century and was reinforced with a metal support; an acorn from the tree was planted in 2007 to grow a replacement. The original Caton Oak fell on 20 June 2016.

== History ==
The Caton is reputed to have been the focus of the village since the era of the druids, for whom the oak was a sacred tree which often formed the centre of religious rites. For this reason the tree is also known as the Druid's Oak. There was activity in the village during Roman times, as evidenced by a millstone found nearby.

The Caton Oak is rooted in the River Lune and the trunk protrudes above a set of old sandstone steps known as the "Fish Stones". In medieval times monks from Cockersand Abbey used the steps to display for sale salmon that had been caught in the river. The tree can be seen to be in good health in a photograph of 1905. By the 1940s the tree was the site for a portable blacksmith's forge where a smith from nearby Hornby regularly set up to shoe horses for Caton's agricultural community.

The tree became a local landmark and a symbol of the village, featuring in the logos of the village school and its sports club. A sign affixed to railings around the tree states that it has been listed as a historic site by the Department of National Heritage. A Caton-with-Littledale parish councillor said in 1996 that "the tree is the most important landmark in Caton and we should try to preserve it as long as there is any life in it at all". The village of Caton lies within the Forest of Bowland area of outstanding natural beauty.

== Death and replacement ==
The tree declined during the later 20th century and was said to have become dangerous by 1996. Specialists were consulted who recommended that the tree be felled but it was saved by the villagers and the parish council who erected metal props to the branch in question. The improvements were carried out in 1998 under the Parish and Community Environment Scheme funded by Lancashire County Council, Caton-with-Littledale Parish Council, Rural Action and public contributions.

By 2007 the trunk, which measured 4 metres (13 ft) in circumference, was hollow through decay. On 27 April 2007 an acorn from the tree was planted within the hollow by the High Sheriff of Lancashire (Ruthe Winterbottom) so that a replacement tree could grow. The new tree would have killed the old tree as it grows within it. The original Caton oak fell on 20 June 2016.

== See also ==
- List of individual trees
