= Marshall Street Baths =

Public baths in Westminster, London

Coordinates: 51°30′49″N 0°8′17″W

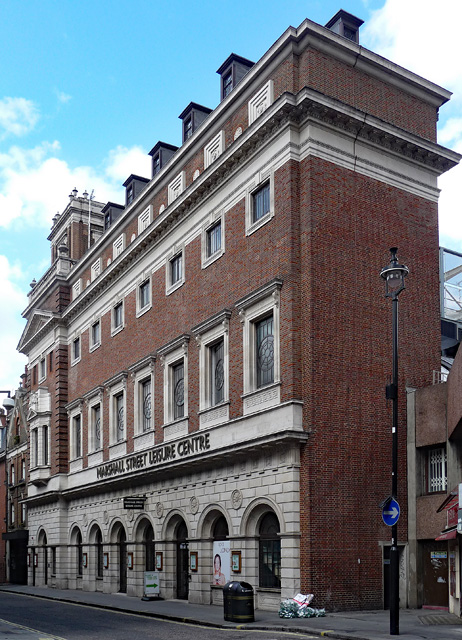
- Interactive map of Marshall Street Baths
- Location: Marshall Street, London, W1F 7EL
- Facilities: gym, steam room, sauna, dance and exercise studios

Construction
- Opened: 1850 (rebuilt 1931 and refurbished in 2010)
- Closed: 1997–2010
- Architect: 1931 Alfred Cross

The Marshall Street Baths (or Westminster Public Baths) in Westminster, London, were built in 1850. They were closed for refurbishment in 1997 and reopened on 27 July 2010 as a modernised leisure centre. The building is noted for its architecture and is Grade II listed.

== Background ==
The first public baths were built on the site by the Vestry of St. James in 1850. The proposal for the baths is mentioned in Public Baths and Wash-houses (1850) and suggests the baths follow a model of 64 first and second class baths, 60 washing compartments, 60 separate drying chambers, 16 ironing compartments and 2 large plunge baths (1st and 2nd class). The land for the Westminster baths was costed at £3,500 including a house for the superintendent. The highest charges were fixed by the Sir Henry Dukinfield's Act at 6d for first class warm bath, 2d for second class warm bath (half these prices for a cold bath) and with charges of 1d/hour for washing, drying and ironing apparatus. The wash house equipment was supplied by J J Lane Ltd of Bethnal Green.

The present building, then known as The Westminster Public Baths, was started in 1928 and completed in 1931. Public funds financed the construction for the health and well-being of local people. The main swimming pool was lined with white Sicilian marble and this marble as well as Swedish green marble were used on the walls at either end. A bronze fountain in a niche at the shallow end, depicting a merchild with two dolphins, was designed by Walter Gilbert. Behind the main pool was a smaller pool, the 'second class bath', which measured 70 ft x 30 ft' covered by a barrel vaulted roof. Initially, the complex also included a child's welfare centre, a public laundry and public washing facilities.

== Redevelopment ==
Marshall Street Baths are owned by the City of Westminster and were closed by the Council in 1997. The site underwent refurbishment by Marshall Street Regeneration Ltd and reopened as a Nuffield Health leisure centre in July 2010. The centre is now run by Everyone Active, under contract for Westminster Council, as the Marshall Street Leisure Centre & Spa. The facilities include a gym, steam room, sauna, dance and exercise studios. The renovated 1930s swimming pool still has its original marble-lined floors and barrel-vaulted ceiling.
