= John Wykeham Archer =

English painter

Archer in the mid 19th century.

John Wykeham Archer (1808 – 25 May 1864) was a British artist, engraver and writer.

== Life ==
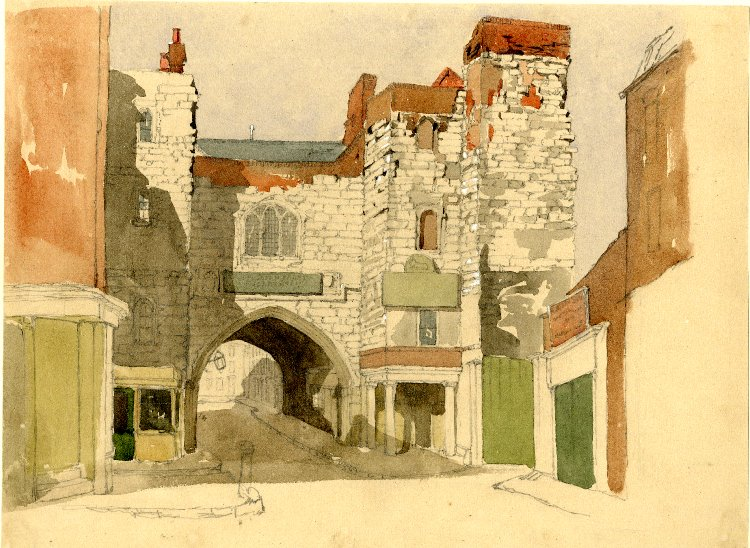
St John's Gate, Clerkenwell, a watercolour by John Wykeham Archer (British Museum).

Archer was born at Newcastle-upon-Tyne, in 1808. In 1820 he went to London, and became a pupil of John Scott, a noted engraver of animals. His apprenticeship was cut short when Scott became ill, and he returned to Newcastle. There, in collaboration with William Collard he etched a series of large plates of Fountains Abbey, after drawings by John Wilson Carmichael, and on his own produced several plates for Mackenzie's History of Durham. He then moved to Edinburgh, where he made a collection of drawings of the ancient buildings and streets of the city.

In about 1830 he returned to London, and entered the studio of the engravers William and Edward Finden, who were then working on illustrations for the annuals and such publications as their Bible Illustrations, and The Ports and Harbours of Great Britain. After a few years the market for this kind of illustration declined, and Archer had to find less renumerative work engraving plates for the New Sporting Magazine.

=== Career ===
Having been elected a member of the New Society of Painters in Water Colours, he produced a series of drawings of St. Mary Overy, previous to its restoration, and of Lambeth Palace. Having accumulated more than one hundred drawings of London antiquities he offered them to the British Museum, which showed no interest; instead he sold them to William Twopenny, who then commissioned Archer to execute twenty more similar drawings each year. In 1874 the British Museum purchased the collection from Twopenny's executors. Archer also made a series of drawings for the Duke of Northumberland, showing places on his estate.

As an illustrator, Archer made drawings for wood engravings for publications including Charles Knight's History of London, Illustrated London News and Blackie's Comprehensive History of England.

Archer was the author of Vestiges of Old London, a large quarto volume, illustrated with etchings; and of a series of articles in Douglas Jerrold's Magazine, entitled "The Recreations of Mr. Zigzag the Elder", and numerous contributions to the Gentleman's Magazine, and Illustrated London News.

He claimed to have revived the practice of engraving monumental brasses, and produced several large monuments of this type from his own designs. He likewise painted a few works in oil.

==== Death ====
He died 25 May 1864 and was buried on the western side of Highgate Cemetery. His grave (no.129110) no longer has a readable inscription on the headstone.

== Sources ==
- Cooper, Thompson (1885). "Archer, John Wykeham" . In Stephen, Leslie (ed.). Dictionary of National Biography. Vol. 2. London: Smith, Elder & Co.
- Peltz, Lucy. "Archer, John Wykenham (1806–1864)". Oxford Dictionary of National Biography (online ed.). Oxford University Press. doi:10.1093/ref:odnb/625. (Subscription, Wikipedia Library access or UK public library membership required.)
