= Notions of the Americans =

Notions of the Americas; Picked Up by a Travelling Bachelor is an 1828 semi-nonfictional travel narrative by James Fenimore Cooper. The work takes the form of letters between a fictional bachelor traveling in the United States to his European friends. Cooper wrote the work while in Europe, and originally published the work anonymously, to conceal his identity and be more convincing to European audiences. The book persuasively argues for the virtue of American values and democracy in comparison to the aristocratic values of Europe.

The bachelor writing the letters uses various elements of American culture as examples to examine the larger cultural trends; for example, he uses the American Navy's systems of promotion and preference as an example of the larger American government's creation of a meritocratic allocation of authority. At times, too, the book doesn't fully confront all of the social issues confronting early America, instead representing them as idealized: for example, James D. Wallace describes the book as treating the domestic sphere as a " "sheltered space," a protective enclosure not only for domestic values and religious ideas, but for gentlemanly honor, literary creation, and the very republican principles on which America was founded" (a concept known as Republican motherhood in scholarship).
