= Reginald Aspinwall =

English painter

- Born: 3 January 1855; Preston, Lancashire
- Died: 26 February 1921 (aged 66); Lancaster, England
- Resting place: Lancaster Cemetery
- Education: Preston Art School

Reginald Aspinwall (born Preston, England, 3 January 1855, died Lancaster, England, 26 February 1921) was an English landscape painter.

== Life ==
Aspinwall was born in Preston, Lancashire where his father was the editor of the Preston Guardian. He first studied art at Preston Art School.

In the early 1870s Aspinwall moved to Lancaster as a student teacher at the Lancaster School of Art (later the Storey Institute) under the Art Master, Herbert Gilbert. In 1876 Aspinwall gained top results and received a special prize for excellence of general study. In the Art Master's Report for the year Gilbert wrote:

I have now only to acknowledge the assistance that has been rendered in the School by my two Assistants, namely Reginald Aspinwall and Richard A Barton, and to express my satisfaction with the way in which they have carried out the duties assigned to them. Reginald Aspinwall having now completed his 6 years of training in Art, is about to enter the world of competition as a landscape painter, in which field I hope and believe that success will attend him, since I am sure he has the ability to secure it.

Aspinwall was a prolific artist who worked in both watercolours and oils. He seems to have adhered to the landscape genre. The School of Art continued to honour him with mentions of his success in their Annual Report of 1879 as a former student.

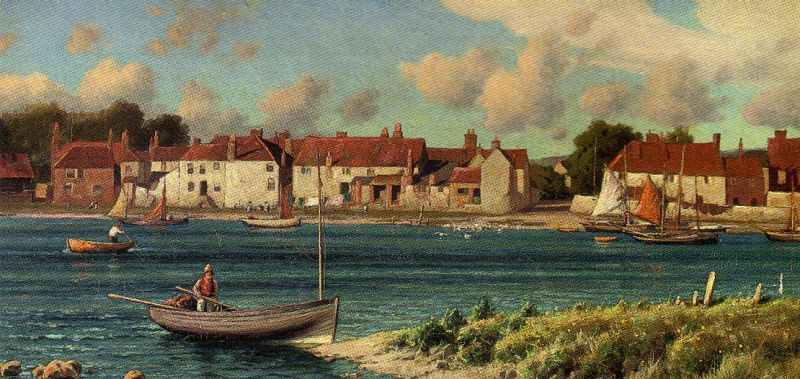
Fishing Boats in Rye Harbour in 1898 by Aspinwall

Aspinwall became an Associate of the Royal Cambrian Academy in 1887, and exhibited there – and at the Royal Academy in London – intermittently from 1884 to 1908.

The quality of his work varies greatly, possibly linked to the artist's growing alcohol dependence. As noted by his obituary:

It was the old old story of Wine in, Wisdom out and the nation was robbed of talents which many would have given thousands to possess.

For some years prior to his death, Aspinwall experienced great financial hardship and was forced into Lancaster Workhouse. In July 1920 he was moved to the Lancaster County Asylum as it was then (later the Moor Hospital buildings). Aspinwall died there on 26 February 1921 and was buried in Lancaster Cemetery.

Aspinwall has over 70 of his paintings in British public collections including several at the Harris Museum & Art Gallery in Lancashire, and 40 paintings at Lancaster City Museum.
