= Caton-with-Littledale =

Civil parish in Lancashire, England

Coordinates: 54.074°N 2.716°W

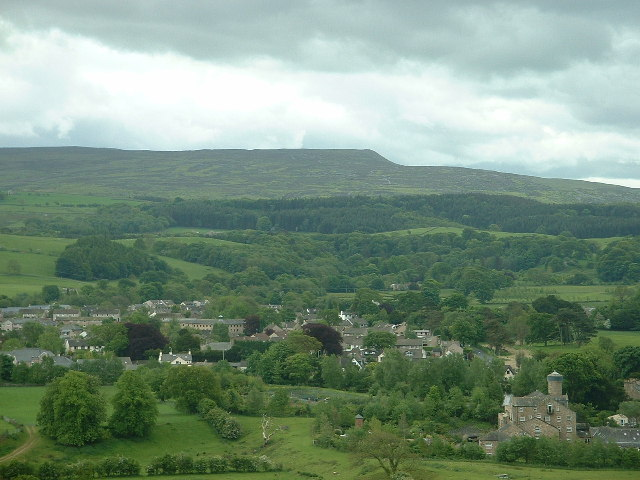
- Caton - looking south toward Clougha

- Location in the City of Lancaster district Location in the Forest of Bowland Location within Lancashire
- Population: 2,851 (2021)
- OS grid reference: SD532645
- Civil parish: Caton-with-Littledale
- District: Lancaster
- Shire county: Lancashire
- Region: North West
- Country: England
- Sovereign state: United Kingdom
- Post town: Lancaster
- Postcode district: LA2
- Dialling code: 01524
- Police: Lancashire
- Fire: Lancashire
- Ambulance: North West
- UK Parliament: Lancaster and Fleetwood
- Website: www.catonparishcouncil.gov.uk

Caton-with-Littledale is a civil parish in the Lancaster district, in Lancashire, England, near the River Lune. The parish lies within the Forest of Bowland Area of Outstanding Natural Beauty and contains the villages of Caton, Brookhouse, Caton Green, Littledale and Townend. In the 2021 Census the population was 2,851.

== History ==
The original settlement of Caton was renamed Brookhouse after Brookhouse Hall and is separated from modern Caton, originally Town End, by Artle Beck.

Evidence of the Roman occupation in the area is from a milestone, eight feet long found in Artle Beck in 1803, bearing the name of the Emperor Hadrian; and further engraved stone found some time later.

Archaeological, place name and other evidence attests that Norse invaders settled in the area in the tenth century (Wainwright 1975). Caton is supposedly named from the Norse personal name Kati (Ekwall 1960), meaning 'cheerful' and ton. Geoffrey Hodgson (2008) argues that the Viking invasion of the area accounts for the relatively high frequency of the Hodgson surname in Caton and elsewhere in Lonsdale.

In late 18th century five mills were built in Town End. Low Mill cotton mill was built for cotton weaving in 1783 on the site of a 13th-century corn mill. it was built by Thomas Hodgson (1738–1817), a son of a Liverpool merchant.(Hodgson 2008) It was powered by a millrace from the Artle Beck at Gresgarth. Water power was replaced by steam in 1819. In the mid 19th century there were two silk mills, two cotton mills, and a flax mill. In 1846 Ball Lane Mill was burnt down. Rumble Row Mill and Forge Mill operated until the 1930s and Willow Mill and Low Mill closed in the 1970s. In 1826 coal and slate were worked in Littledale and bobbins for the mills were made. In 1858 Adam Hodgson built a house which is now the Scarthwaite Hotel.

== Governance ==
Caton was a chapelry composed of four districts; Brookhouse, Caton Green, Littledale, and Town-End, and a township in the ecclesiastical parish of Lancaster in the Lonsdale hundred in Lancashire.

== Geography ==
Caton is 5 miles north-east of Lancaster on the road to Hornby in the valley of the River Lune. It covers over 8,000 acres of which 4,000 were moorland where stone was quarried. The township is hilly, Caton Moor in the east rises to over 1,000 feet (300 metres) above sea level and to the south rises to Clougha Pike at 1,355 feet (413 metres) and Ward's Stone at 1,841 feet (561 metres). The Artle Beck flows in a northerly direction towards the wider flatter valley of the River Lune.

== Transport ==
A turnpike road from Lancaster to Hornby and Kirkby Lonsdale, the A683, was constructed in 1812, bypassing the old route through Brookhouse and Caton Green. This road connects Caton to the M6 motorway to the west.

Caton railway station was opened in 1850 on the "Little" North Western Railway between Wennington and Lancaster and closed in 1966. The section between Caton and Lancaster is now a popular cycle and pedestrian path.

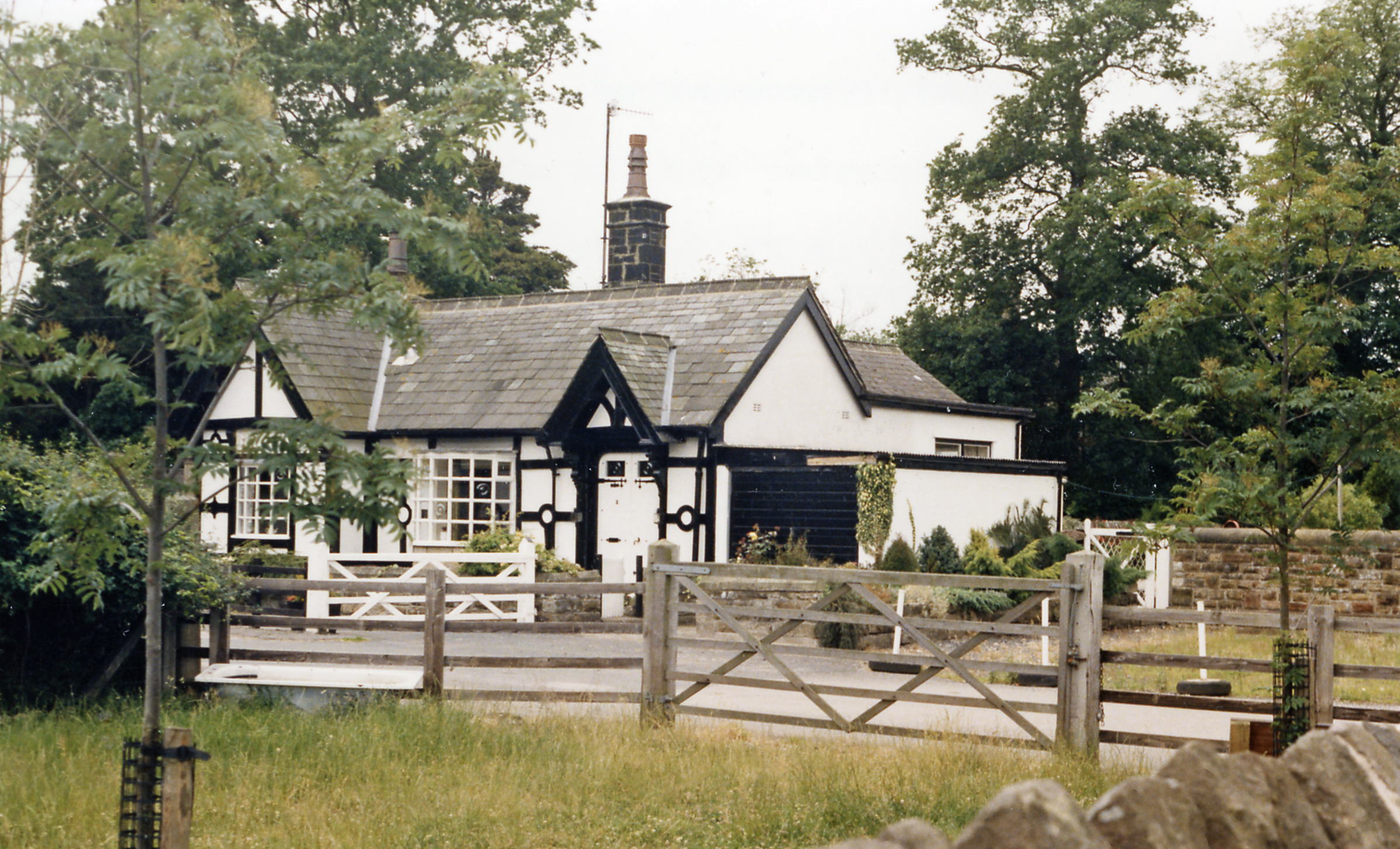
Former station building in 1986

== Economy ==
The village is home to the Station Hotel. The Ship Inn public house closed in 2025.

Brookhouse also has a public house: The Black Bull Inn.

Specialist Bobbin maker T. Wildman & Sons operated in Copy Lane from 1859 to 1973.

== Landmarks ==
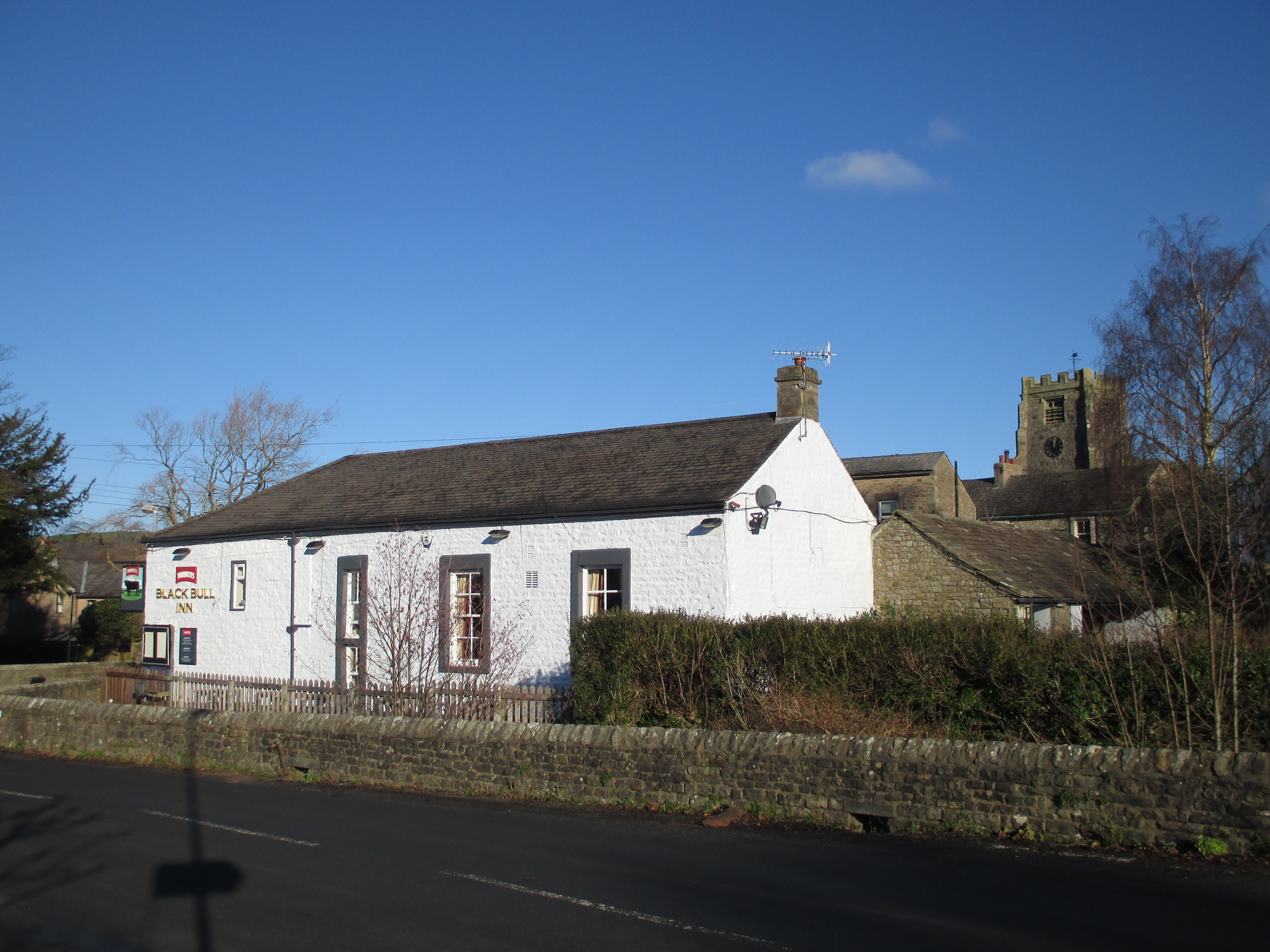
Brookhouse village centre, including the Black Bull Inn and the tower of St Paul's Church

An ancient oak tree, known as the Caton Oak, stood near the Ship Inn, on which the monks of Cockersand Abbey are supposed to have hung fish for sale. The tree fell on 20 June 2016. Nine years earlier, an acorn from the tree was planted within the hollow by the High Sheriff of Lancashire.

== Religion ==
The original chapel built in about 1245 was rebuilt in the 1500s with a square tower. The present Church of St Paul is the parish church and, with the exception of the tower, was rebuilt between 1865 and 1867 by Edward Graham Paley retaining some Norman features. There are other places of worship including Our Lady Immaculate Roman Catholic Church, Caton Methodist Church, Caton Baptist Church in and Brookhouse Methodist Church. There is a memorial to the younger Thomas Hodgson inside St Paul's Church, displaying the family's coat of arms.

== Cultural references ==
The beauty of the area was captured by the artist J. M. W. Turner and described by the poet William Wordsworth. The poet Thomas Gray wrote, "every feature which constitutes a perfect landscape of the extensive sort is here not only boldly marked, but in its best position". When John Ruskin first saw the Lune Valley, he declared, "I do not know in all my country, still less France or Italy, a place more naturally divine or a more priceless possession of the true Holy Land..." although this was attributed to a view from the yard of St Mary's Church in nearby Kirkby Lonsdale, since known as "Ruskin View" rather than the Lune Valley in the parish of Caton-with-Littledale.

== Twinning ==
On 12 April 2008, a formal twinning agreement was signed with the village of Socx in France.

== See also ==
- Listed buildings in Caton-with-Littledale
