= Culbert =

Culbert is a personal name that seems to have originated in Europe. The earliest records for this surname are found in England, Scotland, and Ireland. The use of surnames became necessary when governments introduced personal taxation. In England, heritable surnames started to form in the 11th century, and were common in most areas by 1400. The poll tax introduced in England in the 14th century (considered a head tax) is probably the first time this common usage of surnames was documented.

== Culbert origins ==
A specific origin for this name is not known; however, it does not appear to be derived from a place, nor from an occupation, two common sources for peoples' names.

The following references suggest that Culbert may be derived from other names that describe a person's character. For example, Culbert may stem from Culbheart, which is a Gaelic form meaning "crafty". However, Culbert is not a Gaelic name. It is possible the earliest Culberts in Ireland came there from Scotland and England as a result of the creation of the Plantations of Ulster in the early 1600s. The earliest Culbert record found to date in Ireland is for James Culbert, born in 1651.

Also, crafty is related to "wisdom," and this suggests a possible connection with the surname Cuthbert, a name from the Anglo Saxon, which means "famous, bright, of clear skill or knowledge". It is also believed by some researchers that Culbert is derived from Cutbert. This earlier spelling is very similar to Cuthbert and Cuthbertson, one reason for the close relationship between these surnames. The surname is also closely related to Culbertson and Culberson, which mean son of Culbert.

With regards to claims of origin, MacLysaght states that the surname Culbert is of Huguenot origin, and is found mainly in Ireland's northern province of Ulster. However, no record has yet been found to document that any Culbert was a Huguenot or a Huguenot descendant.

In Scotland, it was reported by Camden that a deed was witnessed by a nobleman who signed as "Culuerti filii Doncani," i.e. Culuert son of Duncan. This deed, made by King Malcolm, was recorded in 1097 wherein land was granted for a church in Coldingham. Based upon this information, Lewis R. Culbertson suggested that there "is but little doubt that Culuert, son of Duncan, was the first of the Culberts."

Also in Scotland, Culbert is considered a variant of Colbert, derived from the Anglo-Saxon Ceolberht/Ceolbeorht (in Old English, ceol = ship and berht/beorht = bright). They suggest Culbert is a personal name dating from the 700s in England; however, no actual records have been found in England for another 850 years.

Also for England, one heraldry-related website claims that Culbert is one of the names of people who migrated there from Normandy following the Norman Conquest, and that Culbert has been found in the Counties of Cheshire and Lancashire. Unfortunately, these records also have not been uncovered. The earliest Culbert found in FamilySearch records for Cheshire is William Culbert b. bef. 1706, and for Lancashire is Thomas Culbert b. bef. 1764. The oldest Culbert record found to date anywhere is for Mutton Culbert, who married Alice Legge on 27 Mar 1554 at St. Nicholas, Ipswich, Suffolk, England.

The earliest home of a Culbertson (son of Culbert) so far found by Lewis R. Culbertson, is located in the County of Roxburg, Scotland, at a small village named Morebattle, eight miles south of Kelso. Here Culbertson people have reportedly lived continuously since the year 1400 AD. This is in the Lowlands and is about five miles from the Cheviot Hills, which form the boundary between Scotland and England.

== Culbert distribution ==
As migrations from Europe became more common in the 19th and 20th Centuries, Culbert people have spread from Europe and have now become more predominant in the United States, Canada, Australia and New Zealand. For example, in the 1881 Census of the United Kingdom (including England, Scotland, Wales, and Ireland), 91 Culbert individuals were indexed, compared to 256 individuals in the 1881 Canada Census, and compared to 620 individuals in the 1880 U.S. Federal Census.

In 2000, the surname Culbert was ranked 12,650 in terms of the most common surnames in the United States, with 2,244 occurrences in the 2000 U.S. Federal Census. The racial/ethnic breakdown included nearly 77 percent White, almost 20 percent Black, a little more than 2 percent Hispanic, about 1 percent Non-Hispanic of two or more races, and minor amounts (less than 1 percent) of Asian and Pacific Islander or American Indian and Alaskan Native.

An extract of an Office of National Statistics database containing a list of surnames in use in England, Wales and the Isle of Man in September 2002 suggests that Culbert was ranked 13,686, with 389 occurrences.

== People ==
Culbert is used as both a given name and as a surname, as in the following examples of persons:

- Culbert Olson was an American politician and governor of California.
- David Culbert, from Australia, is a former international track and field athlete who specialized in the long jump.
- Harold William Culbert (1944–2005) was a member of the House of Commons of Canada from 1993 to 1997.
- Katharine Culbert Lyall was the former president (retired, 2004) of the University of Wisconsin System.
- Major Culbert (born 1987), American football player.
- Sidney S. Culbert (1913–2003) was an American psychologist and Esperantist.

== Places and things named Culbert ==
The following places and objects carrying the name Culbert have been identified to date. Their geographic diversity indicates the geographic diversity of Culbert people.

Australia

- Culbert Learning Center, Calvary Christian College, Queensland. [Note: This college is located on three campuses, and it is uncertain which one holds this center, announced in 2022.]
- Culbert Street, Spring Farm, Sydney, NSW 2570 [Note: this road was on a Feb 2021 house sale listing, but cannot be found on Google Maps.]

The Bahamas

- Culbert's Hill, Nassau GPS: 25.04296590999284, -77.2727677307507
- Culbert's Bay, Nassau GPS: 25.029230463410634, -77.26378769497185

Canada

- Culbert Lake, Northern Manitoba, near the border with Nunavut. Location not yet found. Named for Frederick Campbell Culbert, Royal Canadian Air Force, who was in a bomber shot down over Germany in 1943.
- Culbert Drive, Woodstock, New Brunswick E7M1N9 GPS: 46.169384440400016, -67.58216000153968
- Wendy Culbert Cres, Newmarket, Ontario L3X0E9 GPS: 44.029745793712756, -79.45483234391597
- Culbert Creek and Culbert Lake, Algoma (North), Ontario GPS: beginning in south at 48.95583073017929, -83.98440542745253, and flowing north through Culbert Lake at 48.96574908949619, -83.98633661792923, and continuing north to creek junction at 49.057301995716195, -83.97676649616454

Ireland

- Culbert-court, Barrack-st., probably Dublin

U.K.

- Culbert Avenue, Didsbury, Manchester, England, U.K. M20 6HB [image available] GPS: 53.420271692859906, -2.2205261878677227
- Culbert Lodge, near Eland Street, New Basford, Nottinghamshire, England, U.K.
- Culbert's Court, located in the middle of Little York Street, Belfast [Ireland, now Northern Ireland, U.K.; had 15 small houses in 1860.]
- Culbert Street, Portsoy, Aberdeenshire, Scotland, U.K. GPS: 57.68347814374989, -2.690704060138086 [ref. Councillor Jack Mair, 6 Oct 2008: The people in Portsoy used to call Culbert Street - The Culbert Rig, which is a refurbished traditional fisherman's cottage. Our late local historian, Jim Slater, had a theory that a gentleman named Culbert had a croft at this location. I do not know what evidence he had to arrive at this conclusion. The street slopes down from The Square and at the bottom of the street there is a culvert which carries the water from the Loch, formerly the mill dam, to the sea. I have heard culvert mispronounced culbert. There is also a possibility that Culbert may be a misspelling of Gilbert. When the registration of Births, Deaths and Marriages came into effect a number of people were illiterate and it depended on the Registrar how names were spelled. Gilbert may have been mispronounced to sound like Culbert.]

U.S.

- Culbert Hollow Spring, Cherokee, Alabama 35616 GPS: 34.82035530092676, -88.07649664490704
- There is, or at least was, a Culbert County, Alabama, containing Sheffield and Muscle Shoals. There still is a Colbert County, Alabama.
- Culbert Street, Livingston, Sumter County, Alabama GPS: 32.46172066418088, -88.12850989628917
- Culbert Street, Phoenix, Arizona
- Culbert Street, Little Rock, Arkansas
- Culbert P.O., Randolph County, Georgia. [In 1860 Census; Culbert and/or Cuthbert Post Office; 1870 Randolph County, Georgia, there at least to early 1900s.]
- Culbert Street, Bainbridge, Decatur County, Georgia
- Culbert Mine, Upson County, Georgia, US, c. 1943 [re. photo on EBay]
- Double Culbert Cemetery, Fayette County, Kentucky [ref. Fayette County Genealogical Society Quarterly, Vol. 5, Issue 3, Fall 1990]
- Culbert Zeigler Cemetery, 25197 Zeigler Cemetery Road, Livingston, Louisiana GPS: 30.433060448818836, -90.70209099359329
- Culbert Street, Mattapan (Boston), Massachusetts GPS: 42.27383535283655, -71.0944025727904 [An inquiry sent to Public Works, Boston on 28 Sep 2004 had no response.]
- Culbert Place, Roxbury Crossing (Boston), Massachusetts. Found in Boston City Directories from 1872 to 1915, when it was changed to Vitale Place.
- Culbert Drive, Hastings, Michigan 49058 GPS: 42.6983551991604, -85.26472217278128
- Culbert Road, between Hillsdale and Hudson, Hillsdale County, Michigan. GPS: 41.898658323538264, -84.45091400163452 [Probably associated with the David Culbert family who settled in Hillsdale County.]

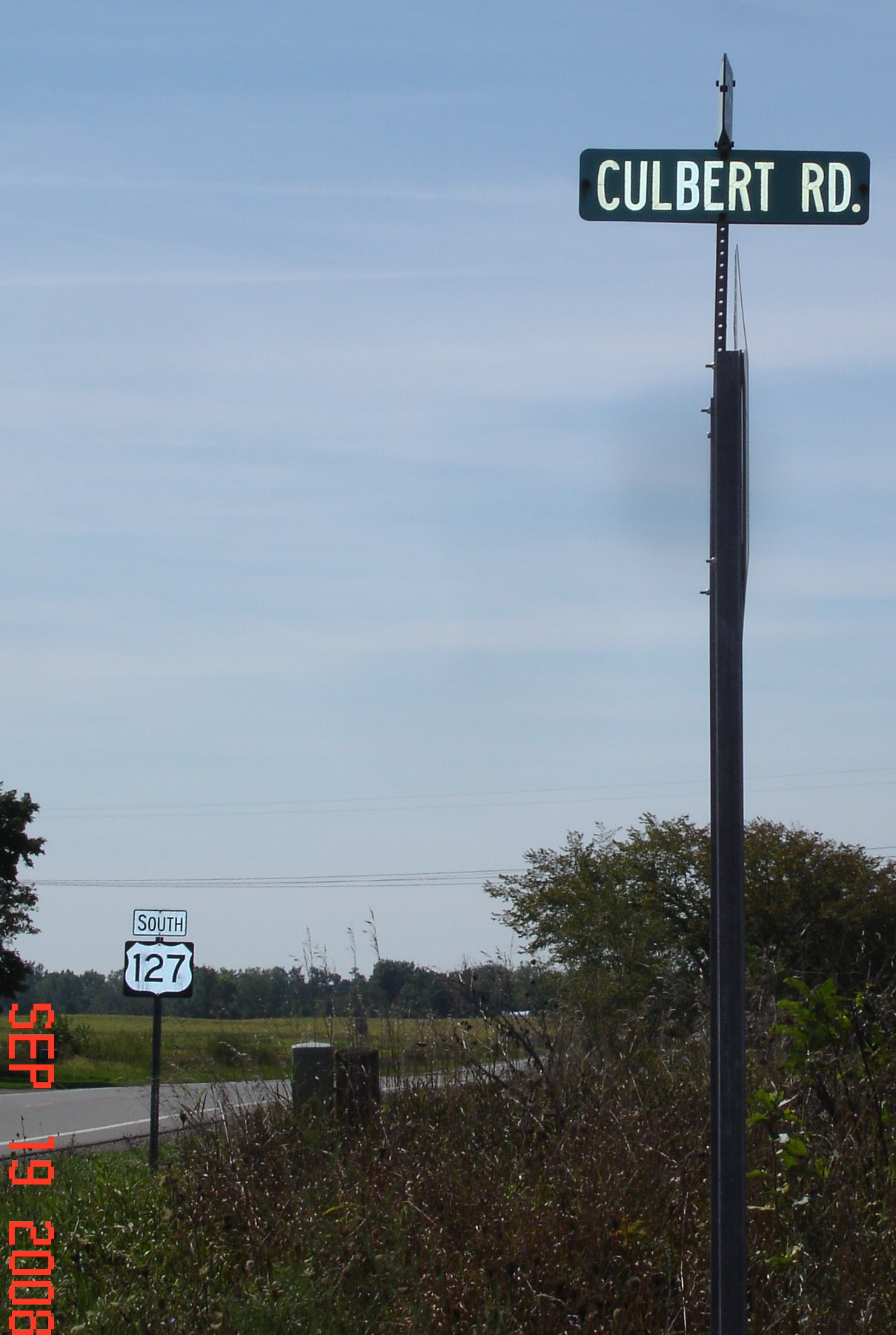
Between Hillsdale and Hudson, Hillsdale County, Michigan, US; image contributed by Margaret Forsythe

- Culbert Road, Moss Point, Jackson County, Mississippi GPS: 30.580779716363004, -88.56492340183996
- Culbert Lake, (part of the Pascagoula River), south of Wade, Jackson County, Mississippi GPS: 30.58613731442976, -88.57129855899265
- Culbert Street, New York City, New York
- Culbert's Hotel on Buffalo Avenue in the LaSalle neighborhood of Niagara Falls, New York GPS: 43.07775547859788, -78.96243484393693 [Now permanently closed]
- Culbert Street in Syracuse, New York GPS; 43.07225896231679, -76.14990844393702
- Culbert Street, Mount Airy, Surry County, North Carolina GPS: 36.49063257061876, -80.60356304406895
- Culbert school-house; located 2 miles east of Centerville, PA. [Mentioned in connection with sermons preached there by Rev. Peter Sahm, after 1836, as part of the history of St. John's Evangelical Lutheran Church, New Florence, PA.; ]
- Culbert Street in Philadelphia, Pennsylvania, US [Notes: Moak's "Philadelphia Street Name Changes" had no listing for "Culbert"; 1839 - Culbert Street joined Charlotte Street; 1859 Phila. Directory on the web contains 7 listings for a street named "Culbert". Here is what I found for "Culbert": street addresses from "below third" to "2052"; intersections with "Canal", "Charlotte", and "Mechanic"]
- Culbert Street, Pittsburgh, Pennsylvania, US
- Culbert Branch Missionary Baptist Church, 647 Elko Street, Williston, South Carolina. (803) 266-4252 GPS: 33.402026737434454, -81.41267414597611
- Culbert Beverage Company, Aberdeen, South Dakota; bottled ROBO drinks
- South Culbert Avenue, Sioux Falls, Minnehaha County, South Dakota GPS: 43.4968754642374, -96.82331991509153 [Named for the Richard Lyle Culbert family who had a farm here]
- South Culbert Avenue, Sioux Falls, Lincoln County, South Dakota GPS: 43.497899437494, -96.82338428650814
- Culbert Drive, Marion, Virginia GPS: 36.85046934087106, -81.5047607440623

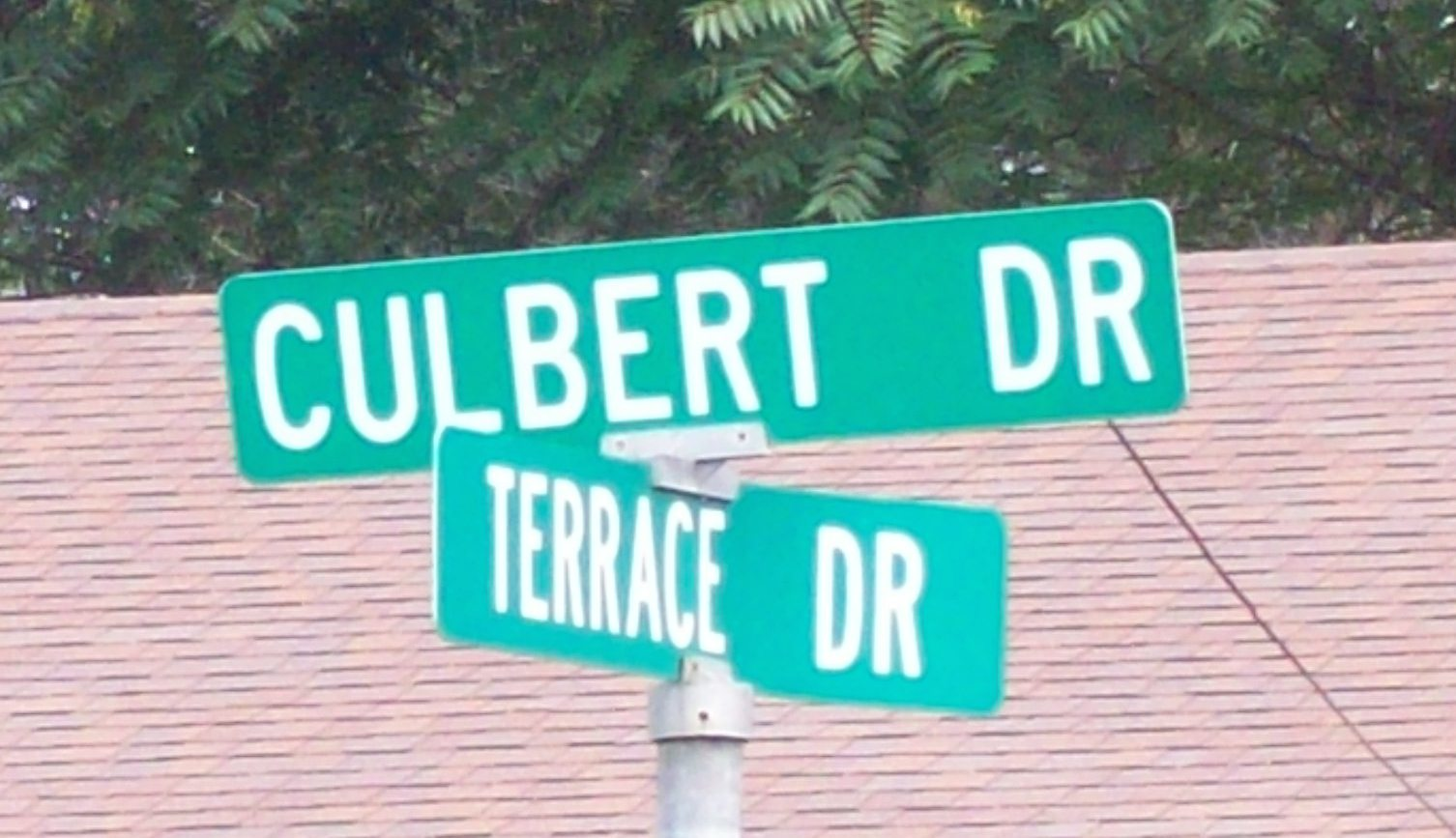
Culbert Drive, Marion, Virginia, US; image contributed by Clarissa Culbert

- Ken Culbert Jr. Road, Purcellville, Loudoun County, Virginia GPS: 39.13751434247276, -77.70248115936316 [Named for Kenneth William Culbert, 1939-2003]

Other Culbert names

- A bark, the M. H. Culbert, which operated at least from 1866 to 1867
- Ship Culbert – "Orkney Shipping, Sailed from Stromness, Sept. 13, Culbert, from Gottenburgh, with iron and deals"
- Ship Culbert – "Ship News, Sailed, 18th, Culbert, oats"
- Ship St. Culbert – "Ship Arrivals. From Calcutta. [Ship] St. Culbert, Toombs, of Portsmouth, from New York, just arrived."
- Schooner Culbert – "Ship News, Port of Philadelphia, Arrived, Schooner Culbert, [from] Virginia"
