= Cuthbertson =

Cuthbertson is a surname. Notable people with the surname include:

- Adam Cuthbertson, Australian rugby league player
- Allan Cuthbertson (1920–1988), Australian actor
- Andrew S. Cuthbertson (1873–1933), American politician and lawyer
- Brian Cuthbertson (1936–2023), Canadian historian
- Catherine Cuthbertson, British novelist (fl. first half of 19th century)
- David Cuthbertson (1900–1989), Scottish biochemist and nutritionist
- George Adrian Cuthbertson (1898–1969), Canadian artist
- Iain Cuthbertson (1930–2009), Scottish character actor
- James Cuthbertson (1851–1910), Scottish–Australian poet and schoolteacher
- Jill Cuthbertson, British special adviser
- John Cuthbertson (disambiguation), various people
- Lauren Cuthbertson, English ballerina
- William Cuthbertson, British Olympic boxing medalist

== See also ==
- Culberson (disambiguation)
- Culbertson (disambiguation)
