= Brandsby Royal Observer Corps monitoring post =

Building in Crayke, North Yorkshire, England

Coordinates: 54°08′28″N 1°07′29″W

Brandsby Royal Observer Corps monitoring post is a historic site in Crayke, a village in North Yorkshire, in England.

The structure was part of a network of 1,518 Royal Observer Corps monitoring posts, built to a standard design. The first were constructed in the late 1950s, and Brandsby was one of the last to be completed, in June 1964. It was part of a group of posts, with the headquarters at York Cold War Bunker. They were to be used in the event of a nuclear attack on the United Kingdom. Half the posts were closed in 1968, and the remainder, including Brandsby, in 1991.

The building is underground, appearing at ground level as a rectangular, grass-covered mound with a flat top, an entrance hatch, and an air vent. There are also metal pipes which were mountings for monitoring equipment. The main shaft is 4.6 metres deep and contains a ladder. At the bottom is a drainage sump and a pump, and two rooms: a small closet, with a chemical toilet; and the monitoring room, with a rubber floor, and polystyrene tiles on the walls and ceiling.

The structure was investigated by Subterranea Britannica in 2002, finding much of the equipment still intact. It was restored, and occasionally opened to the public. It was grade II listed in 2012, upon which the landowner withdrew permission for public access.

== See also ==
- Listed buildings in Crayke
