= St Cuthbert (disambiguation) =

St Cuthbert or St Cuthbert's may refer to:

English saints

- St Cuthbert (634–687)
- Cuthbert of Canterbury (d. 760)
- Cuthbert Mayne (1544–1577)

Places

- Saint-Cuthbert, Quebec, a municipality in Canada
- St Cuthbert Out, a civil parish in Somerset, England
- St Cuthbert Without, a civil parish in Cumbria, England
- St. Cuthbert's Mission, an indigenous village in Guyana

Churches

- St Cuthbert's Church (disambiguation)

Educational institutions

- St Cuthbert's Catholic High School, St Helens, England
- St Cuthbert's College (disambiguation)
- St Cuthbert's High School, Newcastle upon Tyne, England
- St Cuthbert's RC High School, Rochdale, England
- St Cuthbert's Roman Catholic Primary School, Stockton on Tees, England
- St Cuthbert's Society, a college of the University of Durham, England

Other

- St Cuthbert Gospel, a 7th-century gospel pocket book
- Saint Cuthbert (Dungeons & Dragons), a deity in the Dungeons and Dragons game
- St Cuthbert's Cave, Northumberland, England
- St. Cuthbert's Co-operative Society, Scotland
- St Cuthbert's Swallet, a cave in Somerset, England

== See also ==
- Cuthbert (disambiguation)
