= Edward Cuthbert =

Edward Cuthbert may refer to:

- Edward Octavian Cuthbert (1826–1890), Quebec politician
- Ned Cuthbert (1845–1905), American baseball player

== See also ==
- Cuthbert (surname)
