= Listed buildings in Crayke =

Crayke is a civil parish in the county of North Yorkshire, England. It contains 29 listed buildings that are recorded in the National Heritage List for England. Of these, one is listed at Grade I, the highest of the three grades, one is at Grade II*, the middle grade, and the others are at Grade II, the lowest grade. The parish contains the village of Crayke and the surrounding countryside. Most of the listed buildings are houses, cottages and associated structures, farmhouses and farm buildings, and the others include a church, a pinfold and a monitoring post.

== Key ==
Grade	Criteria
I	Buildings of exceptional interest, sometimes considered to be internationally important
II*	Particularly important buildings of more than special interest
II	Buildings of national importance and special interest

== Buildings ==
Name and location	Photograph	Date	Notes	Grade
Crayke Castle; 54.12893°N 1.14598°W		15th century	A tower house built on the site of a Norman castle, with an attached kitchen range. There is also a slightly later, separate, tower which is in ruins. The main building is in sandstone, and the kitchen has a lead roof. There are four storeys, each slightly set back, with floor bands between them, and an embattled parapet. The windows are tall and narrow with chamfered surrounds. The kitchen remains consist of a vaulted undercroft, and the separate ruins include an undercroft, stairs, and the walls of the porch.	I
St Cuthbert's Church; 54.12870°N 1.14406°W		15th century	The church has been altered and extended through the centuries, including a restoration and the addition of the north aisle by E. G. Paley in 1863–64. It is built in stone and is in Perpendicular style. The church consists of a nave, a south porch, a north aisle, a chancel and a west tower. The tower has two stages, and contains a three-light window, a south clock face, and two-light bell openings. The tower, the porch and the body of the church have embattled parapets and pinnacles.	II
Stocking Hall; 54.13766°N 1.14703°W	—	Late 16th century	The house was extended in the 17th century, both parts have timber framed cores, and were later encased in brick, and both have pantile roofs. The original part has two storeys, three bays, and a rear outshut and staircase wing. There is a moulded string course at plinth height, and stepped eaves. The central doorway has a moulded surround, and a moulded modillioned segmental pediment, and is flanked by casement windows with moulded modillioned triangular pediments. In the upper floor are a casement window, a fixed light and a horizontally-sliding sash window. The later part to the left has two storeys and two bays, and contains a mix of sash and casement windows. Further to the left is a barn containing a wagon entrance and pitching doors.	II
Ivy Farmhouse; 54.12924°N 1.13962°W		Early 17th century (probable)	The farmhouse, which has been altered, has a timber framed core encased in brick, and a pantile roof, hipped to the east, and with a catslide at the rear. There are two storeys, and the original three bays have been extended. The doorway has a pediment, the windows are horizontally-sliding sashes, and in the roof are gabled dormers. The gables of the dormers and the body of the house have decorative bargeboards. Inside, there is a large inglenook fireplace and exposed timber framing.	II
Crayke Manor; 54.13775°N 1.13469°W		17th century	A large house that was extended in the 20th century, it is in sandstone, with quoins, and pantile roofs with stone coping. There are two storeys and the original range has three bays. In the middle bay is a two-storey gabled porch containing a semicircular arch with pilasters and a keystone, and in the gable is a round plaque. The windows are mullioned, those in the ground floor with pediments. The later extension to the right is in a similar style.	II*
Tudor Cottage; 54.12691°N 1.14250°W		Mid to late 17th century (probable)	A timber framed cottage, the rear wall rebuilt in brick, on a stone plinth, that has a swept pantile roof with raised rendered verges. There are two storeys, a double depth plan and two bays. The doorway on the right has wooden pilasters, and the windows are casements with lattice glazing.	II
Rose Cottage; 54.12907°N 1.14011°W	—	Late 17th century (probable)	The cottage is in reddish-brown brick, the front whitewashed and the north gable rendered, with a stepped floor band, dentilled eaves, and a swept pantile roof. There is one storey and an attic, and two bays. The doorway and the windows, which are horizontally-sliding sashes, are in architraves.	II
Crayke Hall; 54.12842°N 1.14342°W		c. 1750	The house is in stuccoed brick, and has two storeys and five bays. The round-headed doorway in the second bay has attached fluted columns, a radial fanlight, and an open pediment. It is flanked by canted bay windows, and the other windows are sashes.	II
Church Farm; 54.12787°N 1.14371°W	—	Mid 18th century	A house with an adjoining stable. The house is in red-brown brick with some sandstone at the rear, sandstone quoins, a floor band, stepped eaves, and a swept pantile roof with rendered raised verges. There are two storeys and three bays, with the gable end facing the road. The doorway has an architrave, and most of the windows are horizontally-sliding sashes. Adjoining is a single-storey stable in sandstone with dentilled eaves and a pantile roof, containing a stable door and a window.	II
Town End Farmhouse and farm building 54.12629°N 1.14367°W	—	Mid 18th century (probable)	The farmhouse is in reddish-brown brick, with some sandstone quoins, a floor band, and a pantile roof. There are two storeys and two bays. The doorway on the right has a flat brick arch, and the windows are casements, those in the upper floor with brick soldier arches. To the right is a 19th-century farm building with two storeys, containing a wagon entrance on the left, and upper floor windows with wooden shutters.	II
Water Hall Farmhouse; 54.13984°N 1.12783°W		Mid 18th century	The farmhouse is in pinkish-brown brick, with a floor band, stepped eaves, and a swept pantile roof with raised rendered verges. There are two storeys and two bays. The doorway has a gabled doorcase with bargeboards, and the windows are casements.	II
1 and 2 Priest Cottages; 54.12895°N 1.14025°W		Mid to late 18th century	A house, later divided, in red-brown brick, with a stepped and dentilled eaves cornice, and a pantile roof with stone coping and kneelers. There are two storeys and four bays. The doorways in the outer bays have pilasters and flat hoods on brackets. The windows are horizontally-sliding sashes in architraves, with painted sills and lintels.	II
Bishops Cottage; 54.12829°N 1.14316°W	—	Mid to late 18th century	The house is in red brick on a sandstone plinth, with a floor band, a stepped and dentilled eaves cornice, and a pantile roof with stone coping and kneelers. There are two storeys and three bays, with the entrance at the rear. On the front is an inserted bow window, and sash windows in architraves. To the left is a later barn, subsequently converted into an extension to the house.	II
Danetree; 54.12783°N 1.14274°W		Mid to late 18th century	A house in red-brown brick, with a stepped floor band, stepped eaves, and a pantile roof. There are two storeys and three bays. Steps lead up to a central doorway that has pilasters, an entablature and an oblong fanlight. The ground floor windows are casements under segmental brick arches, and in the upper floor are sash windows in architraves.	II
Gelder Cottage and Plum Tree Cottage; 54.12774°N 1.14327°W	—	Mid to late 18th century	A pair of cottages in pinkish-brown brick with stepped and dentilled eaves and two storeys. The left cottage has three bays, a floor band, and a concrete tile roof, and its ground floor openings have painted splayed lintels. The right cottage has two bays and a pantile roof. The windows in both cottages are horizontally-sliding sashes.	II
The Old Rectory; 54.12833°N 1.14483°W	—	Mid to late 18th century	The house was doubled in size in the 19th century, both parts with two storeys, three bays, and an overhanging pantile roof. The earlier part is in sandstone and red-brown brick, on a plinth, with a floor band, and sash windows with wide timber lintels. The doorway has a hood, and a pediment on consoles, and to its right is a two-storey bow window. The later part is in pale brown brick, and its sash windows have flat brick arches.	II
White House; 54.12644°N 1.14358°W		Mid to late 18th century	A cottage in red brick, whitewashed on the front, the south gable wall encased in 20th-century red brick, with a floor band, dentilled eaves, and a French tile roof. There are two storeys and two bays. The doorway is on the right, and the windows are horizontally-sliding sashes.	II
April Cottage; 54.12676°N 1.14283°W	—	Late 18th century	The house is in pinkish-brown brick with a floor band, dentilled eaves, and a pantile roof with rendered verges. There are two storeys and two bays. Steps lead up to the central doorway, the windows are horizontally-sliding sashes, the ground floor openings under painted lintels.	II
Ivy Cottage and the Old Cottage; 54.12894°N 1.13987°W	—	Late 18th century (probable}	A pair of cottages in red-brown brick with dentilled eaves and a pantile roof. There are two storeys, and each cottage has two bays and a central doorway. The left cottage contains bow windows in the ground floor and casements above, and the right cottage has horizontally-sliding sash windows, the ground floor openings with splayed painted lintels.	II
Solway Cottage; 54.12848°N 1.14071°W	—	Late 18th century (probable}	The cottage is in red-brown and pale pinkish-brown brick, with stepped eaves, and a pantile roof with rendered verges. There are two storeys and three bays, the middle bay projecting slightly, and a single-storey single-bay wing on the right. Steps lead up to the central doorway that has reeded pilasters, an entablature, an oblong fanlight and a cornice. The outer bays contain sash windows in architraves under flat gauged brick arches.	II
Sparling House and Hathaway Cottage; 54.12736°N 1.14249°W	—	Late 18th century	The cottage and house are in red-brown brick and have a pantile roof and two storeys. The house on the left has two bays, a central doorway approached by steps, with a fanlight and horizontally-sliding sash windows. The cottage has one bay, and contains modern casement windows. All the openings have flat brick arches.	II
Weston Cottage; 54.12687°N 1.14262°W		Late 18th century (probable}	The cottage is in reddish -brown brick, with a plinth on the right, and a swept pantile roof. There are two storeys and three bays. The central doorway has a gabled hood on brackets, the ground floor windows are modern casements, in the upper floor are 19th-century sashes in architraves, and all the windows have segmental brick arches.	II
The Homestead; 54.12717°N 1.14209°W	—	1782	A house in red and brown brick on a stone plinth, with a floor band, a stepped and dentilled eaves cornice, and a swept pantile roof with stone coping and kneelers. There are two storeys and three bays, the middle bay projecting slightly. Steps lead up to the central doorway that has an oblong fanlight. The windows are sashes in architraves, and all the openings have painted wedge lintels and keystones.	II
The Little Homestead; 54.12698°N 1.14236°W		Late 18th to early 19th century	A cottage in pinkish-brown brick, with a floor band, dentilled eaves and a swept pantile roof. There are two storeys and two bays. The central doorway has a hood, and the windows are casements, those in the ground floor with painted wedge lintels.	II
Mrs Wellesley's Cottage; 54.12793°N 1.14286°W		Early 19th century	The cottage is in red and brown brick, with stepped eaves and a Welsh slate roof. There are two storeys and three bays. The central doorway has an architrave, and the windows are sashes, those in the ground floor are horizontally-sliding, and in the upper floor they are in architraves. All the openings have painted splayed lintels.	II
Storage building, The Little Homestead; 54.12706°N 1.14224°W	—	Early 19th century (probable)	A barn and hayloft later used for other purposes, in sandstone and brick, with a whitewashed front and a pantile roof. There are two storeys, and it contains a central wagon entrance, a stable door and an upper floor window.	II
Crayke Cottage; 54.12748°N 1.14309°W	—	Mid 19th century	The house is in pinkish-brown brick, and has overhanging hipped Welsh slate roofs. There are two storeys and five bays, the outer bays recessed. In the centre is a Doric doorcase with attached columns, an entablature with metopes and triglyphs, and a dentilled cornice. The windows are sashes with channelled cambered stone lintels.	II
Pinfold; 54.12598°N 1.14395°W	—	19th century	The pinfold is in red brick and has a hexagonal plan. It is about 2 metres (6 ft 7 in) high, and contains an iron gate.	II
Brandsby Royal Observer Corps monitoring post 54.14110°N 1.12450°W	—	1964	The monitoring post is in reinforced concrete and covered in compacted earth. Externally there is a mound of earth with a raised entrance hatch at the southwest end, and an air vent at the northeast. Protruding through the mound are two meal pipes, the mountings for equipment. Inside there is a monitoring room and a closet, and original fixtures.	II
