= Cutten =

Cutten may refer to:

== People with the surname ==
- Arthur William Cutten (1870–1936), Canadian-born American businessman
- George Barton Cutten (1874–1962), Canadian-born university administrator
- Perri Cutten (1952–2025), Australian fashion designer
- William Cutten (1822–1883), New Zealand politician

== Places ==
- Cutten, California

== See also ==
- Cuthbert (disambiguation)
- Cutting (disambiguation)
