= Culbertson =

Culbertson is the name reformed from Culberson and Culbert:

In places:

- Culbertson, Montana
- Culbertson, Nebraska

In people:

- Culbertson (name)
- Ely Culbertson (1891-1955), American contract bridge player, author and promoter, often referred to simply by his surname
  - Culbertson four-five notrump, a slam-seeking convention devised by Ely Culbertson
  - Culbertson system, the earliest dominant bidding system in contract bridge, devised by Ely Culbertson

In other uses:

- Culbertson Mansion State Historic Site, in New Albany, Indiana, USA
- Culbertson's Path, in Pennsylvania, USA
- Cordelia A. Culbertson House, a registered historic location in Pasadena, California

== See also ==
- Culberson (disambiguation)
