= St Cuthbert's Church =

St Cuthbert's Church may refer to:

== United Kingdom ==
- St Cuthbert's Church, Churchtown, Merseyside
- St Cuthbert's Church, Crayke, North Yorkshire
- St Cuthbert's Church, Darwen, Lancashire
- St Cuthbert's Church, Dunoon, Scotland
- St Cuthbert's Church, Durham, County Durham
- Durham Cathedral, formally known as the Cathedral Church of Christ, Blessed Mary the Virgin and St Cuthbert of Durham
- St Cuthbert's Church, Edenhall, Cumbria
- St Cuthbert's Church, Elsdon, Northumberland
- St Cuthbert's Church, Edinburgh, Scotland
- St Cuthbert's Church, Forcett, North Yorkshire
- St Cuthbert's Church, Halsall, Lancashire
- St Cuthbert's Church, Holme Lacy, Herefordshire
- St Cuthbert's Church, Lincoln, Lincolnshire
- St Cuthbert's Church, Lytham, Lancashire
- St Cuthbert's Church, Marton, Middlesbrough
- St Cuthbert's Church, Middleton-on-Leven, North Yorkshire
- Church of St Cuthbert by the Forest, Mouldsworth, Cheshire
- Old St Cuthbert's Church, Oborne, Dorset
- St Cuthbert's Church, Over Kellet, Lancashire
- St Cuthbert's Church, Redmarshall, County Durham
- St Cuthbert's Church, Wells, Somerset

== Other ==
- St Cuthbert's Church, Collingwood, New Zealand

== See also ==
- St Mary and St Cuthbert, Chester-le-Street, County Durham
