= John Cuthbertson =

John Cuthbertson may refer to:

- John Cuthbertson (instrument maker) (1743–1821), English instrument maker living in the Netherlands from 1768 to 1796
- John Cuthbertson (politician) (1834–1882), politician from New Zealand
- John Cuthbertson (footballer, fl. 1939–56), Scottish footballer
- John Cuthbertson (footballer, born 1932), Scottish footballer for Mansfield Town
- John Cuthbertson (cricketer) (born 1942), English cricketer
- John Cuthbertson (Covenanter), Covenanter minister
- John Cuthbertson, see The Last Confession of Alexander Pearce
