= Crayke Castle =

Castle in North Yorkshire, England

Coordinates: 54.1289°N 1.1459°W

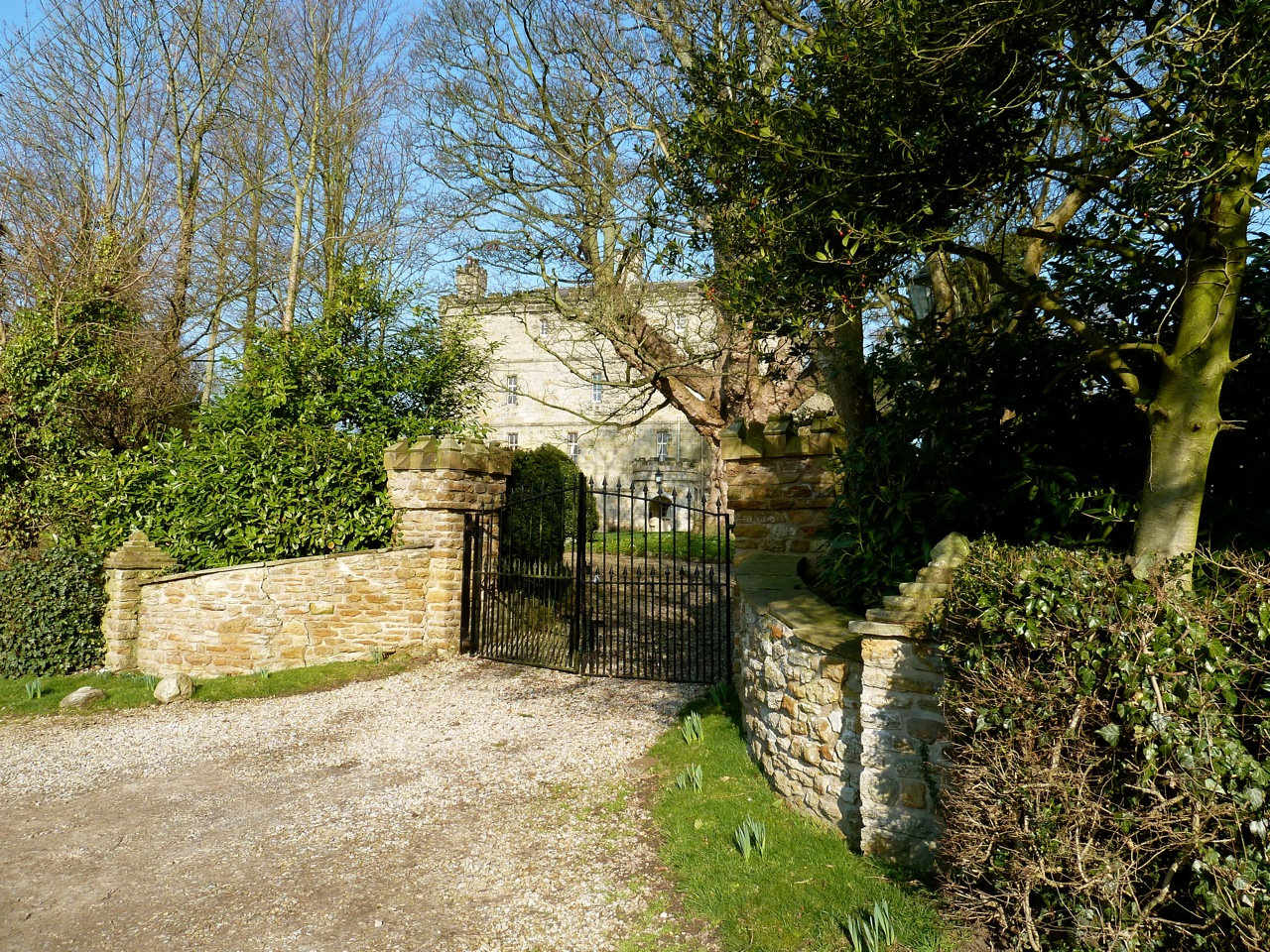
Gates to Crayke Castle

Crayke Castle is a Grade I listed 15th-century castle in Crayke, North Yorkshire, England. The castle consists of a restored 15th-century four-storey tower house with attached outbuildings to the rear and a separate ruined 15th-century tower, the "New Tower". It is situated on Church Hill in the village of Crayke.

== History ==
There is documentary evidence that a castle was built on the existing site soon after the Norman Conquest. The building is reportedly attributed to Bishop Hugh Pudsey. These early records do not give much detail, though the foundations of the current buildings are alleged to be from the earlier construction. The present building was constructed around 1450 for Robert Neville, Bishop of Durham on land which had belonged to the See of Durham since Saxon times. It is situated on the highest point in the Parish at an elevation of 379 feet.

Up to the time of James I the castle was surrounded by a deer park. In 1647 the House of Commons decreed that the castle should not have a garrison and be dismantled. During the Civil War the castle was slighted by the Parliamentarians during the siege of York and it was then sold in 1648 to Sir William Allanson, a former Mayor and MP of York. Allanson’s son Charles repaired and restored the main building to the condition it remains in to this day.

Around 1667 the manor was restored to the See of Durham to be leased out as a farmhouse to various people until Bishop William van Mildert was allowed by Parliament to sell it into private hands in 1827. The castle has been the subject of various surveys, including one by Canon Raine for a report for the Victorian Associated Architectural Societies. It was temporarily requisitioned as a Land Army barracks in the Second World War. The building was listed as Grade I in 1952.

The castle was once the property of Kevin Hollinrake, Member of Parliament for the constituency of Thirsk and Malton since 2015.

== Layout ==
The current layout is made of two separate and self-contained buildings. Only the southernmost building is habitable. The entire site, including grounds, covers about six acres. A survey in 2005 found evidence of a monastic complex that preceded the post-Norman Conquest buildings that occupied the site in a traditional Motte and Bailey layout. There is also evidence for a gatehouse on the site.

=== Main building ===
The structure is made of four storeys and is rectangular measuring 70 ft 9ins by 28 ft 4ins. Each storey is defined by a band of stonework. Each storey has narrow square headed windows and at roof level is a band of crenelation. Entrance used to be via a staircase to the first storey on the northeast side, but this has been removed and the modern building is now accessed at ground level on the south side. There is a vaulted under-croft to the attached building to the rear, which was a 19th-century addition as kitchens. To the rear of these kitchens are foundations to the old hall.

=== "The New Tower" ===
This building lies to the northeast of the main building and was three storeys high. The current ruin is only two storeys. It was arranged in an 'L' shape with the maximum length and width around 49 feet. The ground level is built into the hill so that the upper level opens on to the summit. The height of the remaining walls is about 20 feet.

== See also ==
- Grade I listed buildings in North Yorkshire (district)
- Listed buildings in Crayke
- List of castles in England

Media related to Crayke Castle at Wikimedia Commons
