= St Cuthbert's Church, Crayke =

Coordinates: 54.1287°N 1.1441°W

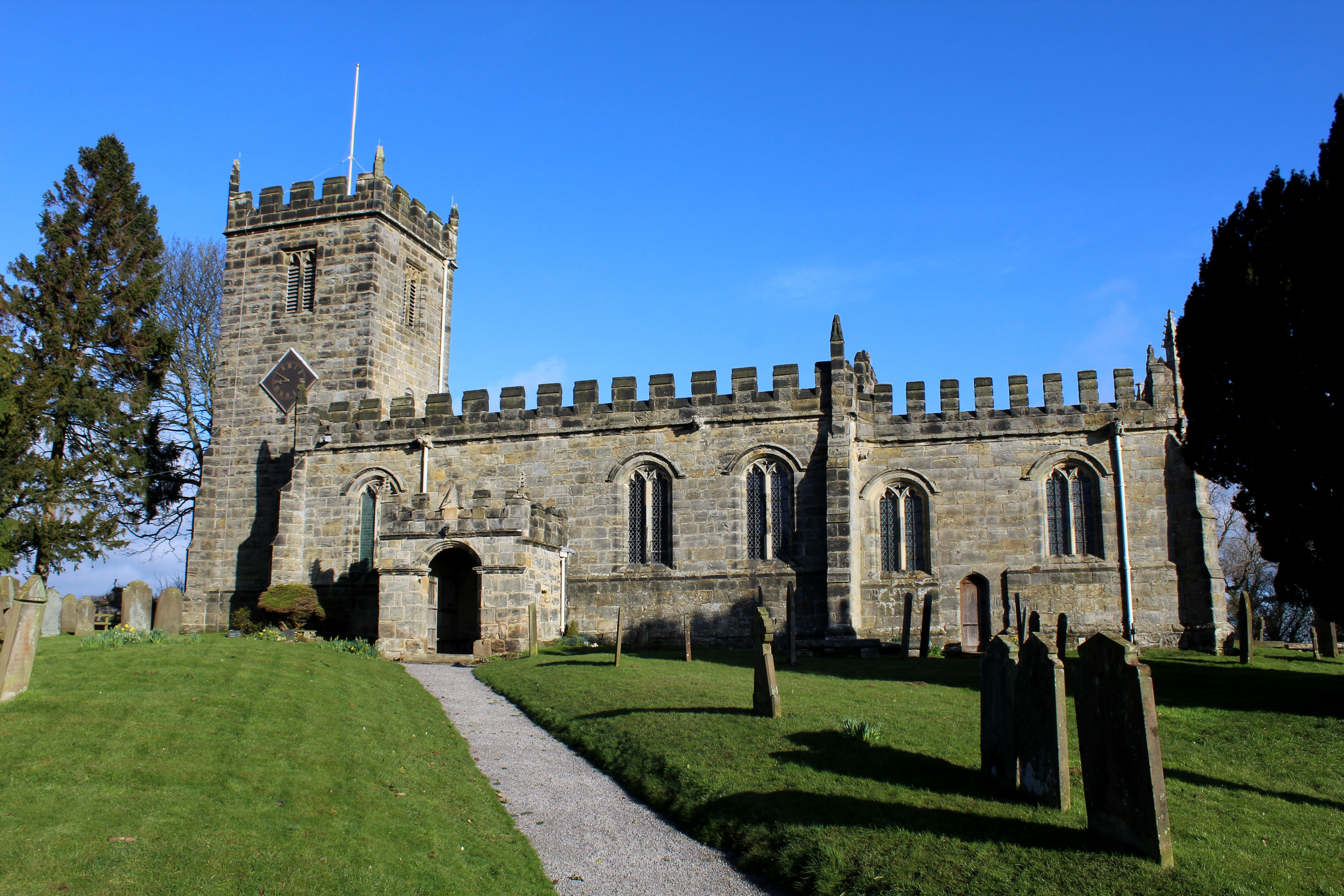
- St Cuthbert's Church, Crayke, from the south

- Location in North Yorkshire
- OS grid reference: SE 560 707
- Location: Crayke, North Yorkshire
- Country: England
- Denomination: Anglican
- Website: St Cuthbert, Crayke

History
- Status: Parish church
- Dedication: Saint Cuthbert

Architecture
- Functional status: Active
- Heritage designation: Grade II
- Designated: 17 May 1960
- Architect: E. G. Paley (restoration)
- Architectural type: Church
- Style: Gothic, Gothic Revival

Specifications
- Materials: Stone

Administration
- Province: York
- Diocese: York
- Archdeaconry: York
- Deanery: Easingwold
- Parish: Crayke

Clergy
- Rector: Revd Ian Kitchen

St Cuthbert's Church is in the village of Crayke, North Yorkshire, England. It is an active Anglican parish church in the deanery of Easingwold, the archdeaconry of York, and the diocese of York. Its benefice is united with those of All Saints, Brandsby, and Holy Trinity, Yearsley. The church is recorded in the National Heritage List for England as a designated Grade II listed building.

== History ==
The present church dates from about 1490 on a site probably occupied by a church in the Anglo-Saxon era. The church was restored and a north aisle was added by the Lancaster architect E. G. Paley in 1862–63, at a cost of £1,000 (equivalent to £110,000 in 2025).

== Architecture ==
The church is constructed in ashlar stone in Perpendicular style. The plan consists of a three-bay nave with a north aisle and a south porch, a two-bay chancel, and a west tower. The church is battlemented throughout with pinnacles and gargoyles. The tower is in two stages, with a three-light west window in the lower stage and two-light bell openings in the upper stage. The east window has three lights, and contains stained glass by William Wailes. The font is from the 15th century, and the pulpit is dated 1637. The pews date from the 17th century. In the church is a late 16th-century memorial with recumbent stone effigies.

== See also ==
- Listed buildings in Crayke
- List of ecclesiastical works by E. G. Paley
