= St Cuthbert's College =

St Cuthbert's College can refer to different educational institutions that are named after Saint Cuthbert. These include:

- St Cuthbert's College, Auckland, an independent, Presbyterian-based, day and boarding school for girls, located in Epsom, Auckland, New Zealand
- St Cuthbert's College, Ushaw, a former name of Ushaw College, a former Roman Catholic seminary and licensed hall of residence of the University of Durham
- St Cuthbert's College, Worksop, a former name of Worksop College, England
- St Cuthbert's Society, one of sixteen collegiate bodies within the University of Durham

== See also ==
- St Cuthbert (disambiguation)
