= Kevin Hollinrake =

British politician (born 1963)

Kevin Hollinrake MP
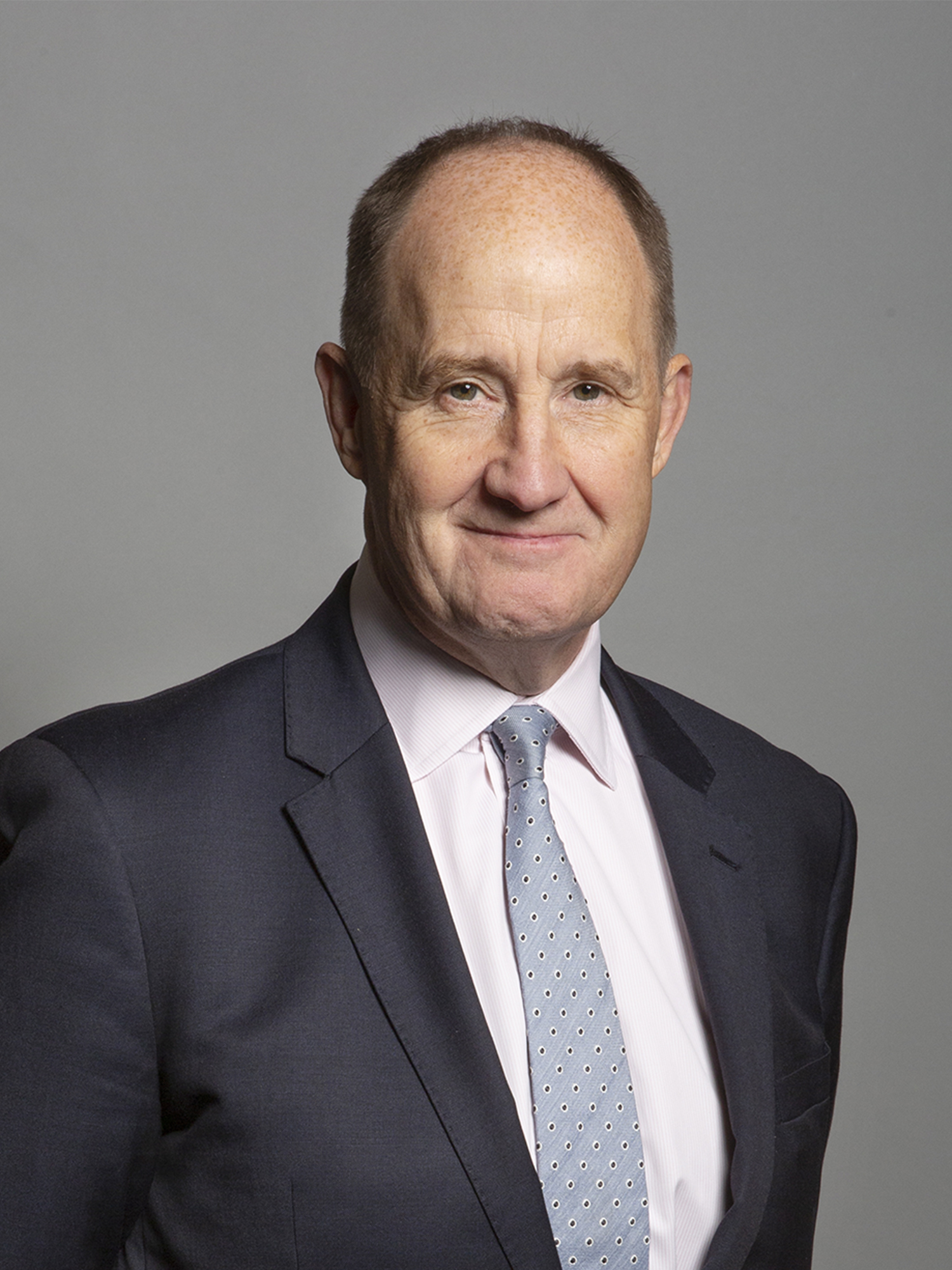
- Official portrait, 2019

Chairman of the Conservative Party Shadow Minister without Portfolio
- Incumbent
- Assumed office 22 July 2025
- Deputy: Matt Vickers
- Leader: Kemi Badenoch
- Preceded by: Nigel Huddleston; The Lord Johnson of Lainston

Shadow Secretary of State for Housing, Communities and Local Government
- In office 5 November 2024 – 22 July 2025
- Leader: Kemi Badenoch
- Preceded by: Kemi Badenoch
- Succeeded by: James Cleverly

Shadow Secretary of State for Business and Trade
- In office 8 July 2024 – 5 November 2024
- Leader: Rishi Sunak
- Preceded by: Jonathan Reynolds
- Succeeded by: Andrew Griffith

Minister of State for Enterprise, Markets and Small Business (Note: Parliamentary Under-Secretary of State for Enterprise and Markets from February 2023 to December 2023; Parliamentary Under-Secretary of State for Enterprise, Markets and Small Business from December 2023 to March 2024)
- In office 27 October 2022 – 5 July 2024
- Prime Minister: Rishi Sunak
- Preceded by: Dean Russell
- Succeeded by: Justin Madders

Member of Parliament for Thirsk and Malton
- Incumbent
- Assumed office 7 May 2015
- Preceded by: Anne McIntosh
- Majority: 7,550 (15.1%)

Personal details
- Born: Kevin Paul Hollinrake; 28 September 1963 (age 63) Easingwold, North Riding of Yorkshire, England
- Party: Conservative
- Children: 4
- Education: Sheffield City Polytechnic
- Website: Official website

Kevin Paul Hollinrake (born 28 September 1963) is a British Conservative Party politician and businessman who has served as the Member of Parliament (MP) for Thirsk and Malton since 2015. He has served as Chairman of the Conservative Party since July 2025.

He has previously served as Shadow Secretary of State for Housing, Communities and Local Government between November 2024 and July 2025. He served as Shadow Secretary of State for Business and Trade from July to November 2024. He served as Minister of State for Enterprise, Markets and Small Business from 2022 to 2024.

== Early life and education ==
Kevin Hollinrake was born and brought up in North Yorkshire. His father was a milkman and his mother was a social worker. He attended Easingwold School and studied physics at Sheffield City Polytechnic (now Sheffield Hallam University), though he did not complete his degree.

== Business career ==
After dropping out of Sheffield City Polytechnic, Hollinrake worked for Prudential. He then cofounded Hunters estate agency in York in 1992; he had previously owned Crayke Castle. By 2015 the agency had grown to more than 150 branches across the country, with Hollinrake holding a 15% stake in the company. The Hunters Property estate agency was admitted to trading on AIM in July 2015 with a market capitalisation of £16.9m. In February 2015, the company issued an IPO (initial public offering) for new investors to raise £2.5 m for capital investment.

In 2009 Hollinrake became a director of Vizzihome, from which he resigned in 2013. In 2013 he founded Shoptility Limited, where he was the chairman until commencement of voluntary winding up in October 2017, and the company was dissolved in June 2019.

In July 2007 Hollinrake was selected as the Conservative candidate for Dewsbury for the 2010 general election. However in October 2008 he resigned his candidacy in order to focus on his business.

== Parliamentary career ==
=== Backbencher ===
Hollinrake was selected to be the Conservative candidate for the seat of Thirsk and Malton at the 2015 general election following the de-selection of Anne McIntosh. Hollinrake was a strong supporter of David Cameron's Northern Powerhouse idea, which aims to link the north of England more closely to markets in the south; making it easier to travel, exchange and do business. He was elected with 52.6% of the vote and a majority of 19,456.

In January 2016, Hollinrake was one of 72 MPs who voted down an amendment in Parliament on rental homes being "fit for human habitation" who were themselves landlords who derived an income from a property. He was opposed to Brexit before the 2016 referendum.

At the snap 2017 general election, Hollinrake was re-elected with an increased vote share of 60.0% but a decreased majority of 19,001.

In 2019, Hollinrake was one of 72 MPs who voted to not permit same-sex marriages in Northern Ireland. He served as the Parliamentary Private Secretary to Michael Gove as Secretary of State for Environment, Food and Rural Affairs from June to December 2019.

At the 2019 general election, Hollinrake was again re-elected, with an increased vote share of 63.0% and an increased majority of 25,154.

In 2020, Hollinrake became one of four Vice-Chairs of the All Party Parliamentary Group on Whistleblowing. This group has been subject to criticism by some campaigners on whistleblowing law reform.

In September 2020, Hollinrake was criticised for a tweet he made in response to a question about the free school meal campaign run by footballer Marcus Rashford. When asked on Twitter ''why it takes a footballer to make a stand for hungry children in our country'', he replied that ''where they can, it's a parent's job to feed their children.'' This prompted a backlash from Rashford and members of the public. Hollinrake defended himself, stating that tax rises would be required for such action.

In April 2021, The Observer revealed that Hollinrake claimed expenses of £2,925 each month between April and November 2020 to pay his own rent despite renting out five residential properties of his own in York. When asked to comment, Hollinrake acknowledged that he owned other properties, but claimed to have seen a "substantial reduction in earnings" since leaving the private sector and said that he did not think it would be reasonable for him to have to pay for his own accommodation expenses in London.

In November 2021, he was one of 13 Conservative MPs who voted against a government-supported amendment to defer the suspension of Conservative MP Owen Paterson who was found to have breached lobbying rules.

=== In government ===
In October 2022, Hollinrake was appointed to the post of Parliamentary Under-Secretary of State in the Department for Business and Trade. As the Minister for Postal Affairs, he was responsible for Government oversight of Post Office Limited.

On 26 March 2024, Hollinrake was promoted to minister of state in the Department for Business and Trade but kept his responsibility for the postal affairs portfolio.

=== In opposition ===
At the 2024 general election, Hollinrake was again re-elected, with a decreased vote share of 39.2% and a decreased majority of 7,550.

Following the subsequent formation of the Starmer ministry, Hollinrake was appointed in July 2024 as Shadow Secretary of State for Business and Trade in Rishi Sunak's caretaker Shadow Cabinet.

In July 2025 Hollinrake was appointed Chairman of the Conservative Party.

== Notes ==
Parliament of the United Kingdom
Preceded by Anne McIntosh	Member of Parliament for Thirsk and Malton; 2015–present	Incumbent
Political offices
Preceded by Kemi Badenoch	Shadow Secretary of State for Housing, Communities and Local Government; 2024–2025	Succeeded by James Cleverly
Party political offices
Preceded by Nigel Huddleston; The Lord Johnson of Lainston	Chairman of the Conservative Party; 2025–present	Incumbent
