= Crayke Manor =

Manor house in North Yorkshire, England

Coordinates: 54°08′16″N 1°08′05″W

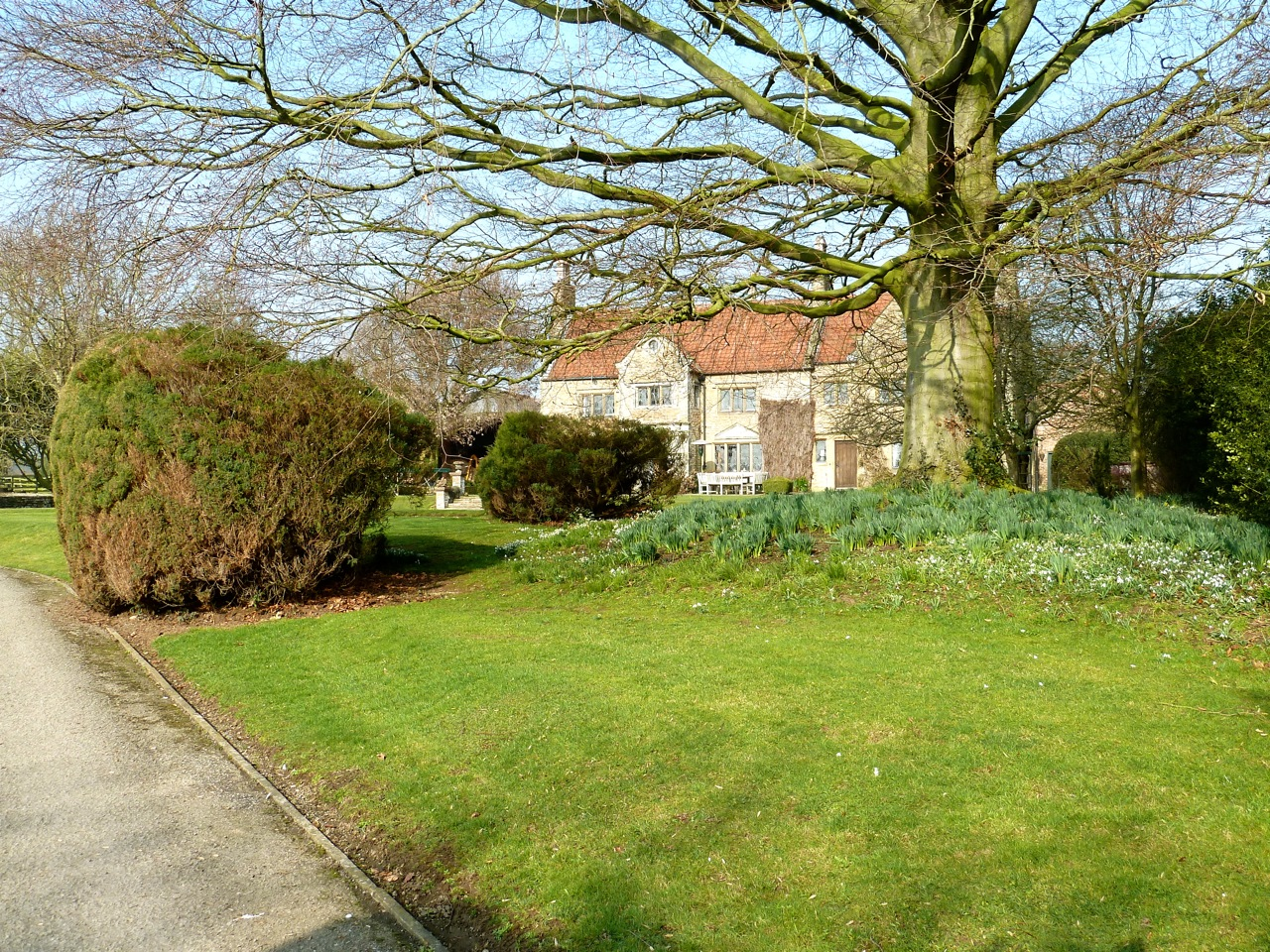
The building, in 2011

Crayke Manor is a historic building in Crayke, a village in North Yorkshire, in England.

The building was constructed in the early 17th century, as Wyndham Hall. In the early 20th century, it was extended to the east, and the interior was largely remodelled. The house was grade II* listed in 1952.

The house is built of sandstone, with quoins, and pantile roofs with stone coping. There are two storeys and the original range has three bays. In the middle bay is a two-storey gabled porch containing a semicircular arch with pilasters and a keystone, and in the gable is a round plaque. The windows are mullioned, those in the ground floor with pediments. The later extension to the east is in a similar style. Inside, there is much original panelling, and also panelling brought from Howley Hall in the early 20th century. The focal point is the 37 feet (11 m)-long drawing room.

== See also ==
- Grade II* listed buildings in North Yorkshire (district)
- Listed buildings in Crayke
