= Cuthbert (disambiguation) =

St. Cuthbert of Lindisfarne (c. 634–687) was an Anglo-Saxon saint, bishop, monk and hermit.

Cuthbert may also refer to:

Places in the United States:

- Cuthbert, Georgia, a city
- Cuthbert, South Dakota, an unincorporated community
- Cuthbert, Texas, a ghost town

People:

- Cuthbert (given name)
- Cuthbert (surname)

Other uses:

- Cuthbert, Western Australia, a locality in the City of Albany
- "Cuthbert", World War II Allied spy Virginia Hall's nickname for her prosthetic leg

== See also ==
- St Cuthbert (disambiguation)
- Cuthberts Building, Johannesburg, South Africa
