= John Cuthbertson (cricketer) =

English cricketer (born 1942)

John Layton Cuthbertson (born 24 February 1942 in Bombay, India) is an English former first-class cricketer active 1962–63 who played for Surrey and Oxford University. He also played hockey for Surrey and Oxford University.
