= Sidney S. Culbert =

Sidney Spence Culbert (May 14, 1913 – October 28, 2003) was a linguist, psychologist and Esperantist.

== Biography ==
Born in Miles City, Montana, Culbert moved to Tacoma, Washington with his family in 1923 and lived in Tacoma and Seattle for most of his life.

He extensively researched the number of speakers of various languages throughout the world (by stratified sampling), and contributed to the World Almanac's section on "Principal Languages of the World". An Associate Professor of Psychology at the University of Washington (Seattle) for most of his academic career, in addition to his research into the speaking populations of languages he made significant contributions to the study of perception, contributions that were influential in the design of cockpit instrument panels in the Boeing 707 jet aircraft. Prior to receiving his doctorate and accepting a professorial position, Culbert had worked for a number of years as an engineer with the Boeing Company. During his tenure at the University of Washington he was actively involved in establishing the university's Linguistics Department, but chose to remain in the Psychology Department because his main linguistic focus, involving issues of perception, was in the field of psycholinguistics, which was then seen as more a matter of psychology than of language.

He died on October 28, 2003.

== Sources ==
- Research and Methods for Esperanto speakers
- Longer obituary article on Sidney and his wife Ruth
