= Cuthbert (surname) =

Cuthbert is a surname of Anglo-Saxon origin. The name began as a mononymous personal name from the Anglo-Saxon Cuthbeorht, coming from Old English Cūðbeorht, with cúð meaning "famous" and beorht meaning "bright". Such compound or dithematic names were associated with the naming of Germanic warriors, and were not meant to carry the literal meaning of each component. Thus Cuthbert can be understood to have carried the meaning of someone famous and bright, possessing clear skill or knowledge. Other interpretations have included "bright champion" and "famous for knowledge". The use of Cuthbert as a personal name long predates the widespread use of surnames in Great Britain. The name became especially popular during and after the time of St. Cuthbert of Lindisfarne, after which Cuthbert became a common baptismal name in the areas of saint's influence in northern England and southern Scotland. It remained a popular given name in those areas after the Norman Conquest due to the saint's cult. The surname Cuthbert emerged from the use of the given name, typically in patronymic fashion. The surname also has a well documented history in eastern Scotland, as well as in many parts of Ireland.

An additional origin for the surname has been proposed from Cubières-sur-Cinoble. It may also be a variant of the surname Coubrough, an anglicization of McCoubrey, which comes from the Scottish Gaelic Mac Cuithbreith, meaning "son of Cuthbert".

Notable people with the surname include:

- Alan William Cuthbert (1932–2016), a British pharmacologist and fellow of University College London
- Alex Cuthbert (born 1990), Welsh rugby union player
- Alfred Cuthbert (1785–1856), United States Representative and Senator from Georgia
- Betty Cuthbert (1938–2017), Australian athlete
- Charles Cuthbert, American architect of Kansas
- Cheslor Cuthbert, baseball player
- Chris Cuthbert (born 1957), Canadian sportscaster
- Dylan Cuthbert, British programmer
- Elisha Cuthbert (born 1982), Canadian actress
- Erin Cuthbert (born 1998), Scottish footballer
- Frederick Alexander Cuthbert (1902–1978), Landscape Architect
- Grace Cuthbert MBE (1900 – 1988), Australian doctor and Director of Maternal and Baby Welfare
- Jack Cuthbert (born 1987), English rugby union player
- Jeffrey Cuthbert (born 1948), Welsh politician, member of the National Assembly of Wales
- John Cuthbert (Royal Navy officer) (1902–1987), vice admiral
- Josh Cuthbert, English singer (Union J)
- Juliet Cuthbert (born 1964), Jamaican runner, primarily in the sprints
- Mike Cuthbert, host of AARP's Prime Time Radio show
- Ross Cuthbert (politician) (1776–1861), Canadian writer, lawyer and politician
- Scott Cuthbert (born 1987), Scottish footballer

Fictional characters:

- Marilla and Matthew Cuthbert, from Anne of Green Gables
