= McCoubrey =

McCoubrey is a surname linked to Coubrough from the Scottish Lowlands between Glasgow and Edinburgh. The McCoubrey name came into existence in Northern Ireland during the early 18th century. First recorded instances are found in Ballynahinch Presbyterian church records in County Down, between 1701 and 1720 as McCubrogh or McKubrogh.

George Black's "The Surnames of Scotland" documents Coubrough as "a now not very common surname found in Lanarkshire and Midlothian. It is a shortened form of MacCoubrey."

In earlier times various spellings can be found: Coubruch, Coubrough, Coubreach, Coubreath, Couburgh, Coulbrough, Cowbreath, Cowbroch, Cowbrough, Cowbraht, Cubrugh, and Cubrughe. The name is not Scottish Gaelic, but rather of Strathclyde Britons origin. Despite the people being of Britons origin, they came to be part of the Galbraith Clan of Lennox. Culcreuch Castle was the historic seat of the clan; the names are common in the areas around the castle, such as in Strathblane and Campsie dating to 1650, less common in Kirkintilloch, Glasgow and Falkirk in the late 1600s.

Notable people with the McCoubrey surname include:

- Adrian McCoubrey (born 1980), Irish cricketer
- Edgar L. McCoubrey (1904–2001), American automobile dealer and mayor
- Moses McCoubrey (1844–1932), Canadian Pioneer
- Margaret McCoubrey (1880–1955), Irish suffragist
