= George Adrian Cuthbertson =

Canadian marine and industrial artist

George Adrian Cuthbertson (1898–1969) was a Canadian marine and industrial artist, researcher, and author. He was born in Toronto, Ontario.

== Early life and training ==
Cuthbertson grew up both in Toronto and Montreal. He studied at the Toronto Model School, the University of Toronto, and the Westmount Academy in Montreal, Quebec. He studied with John D. Kelly in Toronto and with William Brymner at the Art Association of Montreal, Quebec. At 13, he worked in the summer on a steamer as an able bodied seaman in Montreal.

== Military service ==
He entered the Royal Military College of Canada in Kingston, Ontario in 1914, but left after one year. At age 17, he joined the Dover Patrol of the British Navy. At the time, he was the Navy's youngest commissioned officer. He served from 1915 to 1918, on trawlers, mine sweepers, and mine layers. Upon leaving the service, he operated a woollen mill at Thurso, Quebec, where he lived for the remainder of his life. He died there in 1969.

== Professional career ==
Along with Paul Caron, Cuthbertson illustrated Blodwen Davies' book about the Saguenay River, Saguenay, (Toronto: McClelland & Stewart, Ltd., 1930). Cuthbertson also authored and illustrated Freshwater, a history of the Great Lakes, published by MacMillan, in 1931.

He became a prominent marine painter, exhibiting in major centres in Canada and the United States. His works are found in the collection of the National Archives of Canada, the Canada Steamship Lines Maritime Collection and various North American marine museums.

The Canada Steamship Lines exhibited his fully worked watercolours and maps with accompanying catalogues, in 1928 and 1942. In 1942, the exhibition travelled to London, Ontario and Fort William, Ontario and to the Mariners Museum in Newport News, Virginia.

Cuthbertson also worked as a staff artist at the Canadian Mining Journal in which are found many of his sketches and illustrations of industrial mining-related scenes. A Cuthbertson sketch of prospector Thomas Baycroft appeared most recently in the May 2022 edition of the CMJ. In addition, Cuthbertson was also commissioned by the International Nickel Company (INCO, now Vale Canada Ltd) to illustrate scenes of the company's mines and plants in the Sudbury, Ontario region. One of his color illustrations "The Great Frood Mine" appears on the cover of one of the editions of the 1950s INCO publication "The Romance of Nickel".

== Works ==
Many of his works describe the history of shipping on the Great Lakes. The Marine Museum of the Great Lakes in Kingston, Ontario features several of his works:

- drawings as a child in Toronto, Ontario
- wartime watercolours,
- charcoal study sketches done after the war.

Maritime Subjects include:

- Esquimalt, British Columbia Barquentine Puako, Fremona & Tory Head; Dugout Canoe, "Her Majesty's Ship (HMS) Rainbow and (HMS) Algeria"
- Vancouver, British Columbia Harbour; "M.L. in Heavy Weather"; Egeria Cutter; Sir Henry Harness;
- Halifax, Nova Scotia Kingfisher; "Triumph at Halifax"; "Canadian Submarines Arriving at Halifax";
- Warwick and Knapton Canal;
- Ottawa, Ontario Ottawa River-Lake Champlain (Barge Series); Barge Hon. L. Hill of Whitehall, N.Y.; Ottawa Transportation Co.,
- Then Hull, Quebec now Gatineau, Quebec "Blue Barges" (6);
- Niagara Railway Suspension Bridge;
- Mutton Harbour/ Her Majesty's Canadian Ship Acadia elevation;
- Castlegar Ferry Landing and West Robeson Canadian Pacific Railway Steamer;
- Cliff Face Construction (Caribou Road);
- A Mississippi and Ohio River Steamer,
- Pittsburg (Sailor smoking cigar); and others.

Some of Cuthbertson's graphite art commissioned by the International Nickel Company appears in the November 1937 issue of the Canadian Mining Journal, including:

- The Converter Aisle at Copper Cliff,
- Battery of Marcy Rod Mills, Copper Cliff,
- Wire Bar Casting at Ontario Refining Co. Ltd.,
- A Rough Sketch of the Frood Mine Hoist,
- Interplant Surface Railway Equipment,
- Thomas Baycroft - Old Time Prospector for Canadian Copper Co. - Discovers Traces of Nickel Ore, and
- The Frood Mine.

Some of Cuthbertson's color illustrations commissioned by the International Nickel Company appear in the May 1946 issue of the Canadian Mining Journal, including:

- The Great Frood Mine,
- The Frood Open Pit,
- Converter Aisle,
- Hot Metal Car, and
- Rod Mill Aisle.

=== Archives ===
There is a George A. Cuthbertson fonds at Library and Archives Canada. The archival reference number is R3008, former archival reference number MG30-D193. The fonds covers the date range ca. 1897 to 1968. It consists of 1.4 meters of textual records, 257 artworks, 41 photographs, and 4 reproductions. One additional single item (a watercolour painting of HMCS Tuna by George A. Cuthbertson) exists at Library and Archives Canada. The archival reference number is R16633.
