= Cuthberts Building =

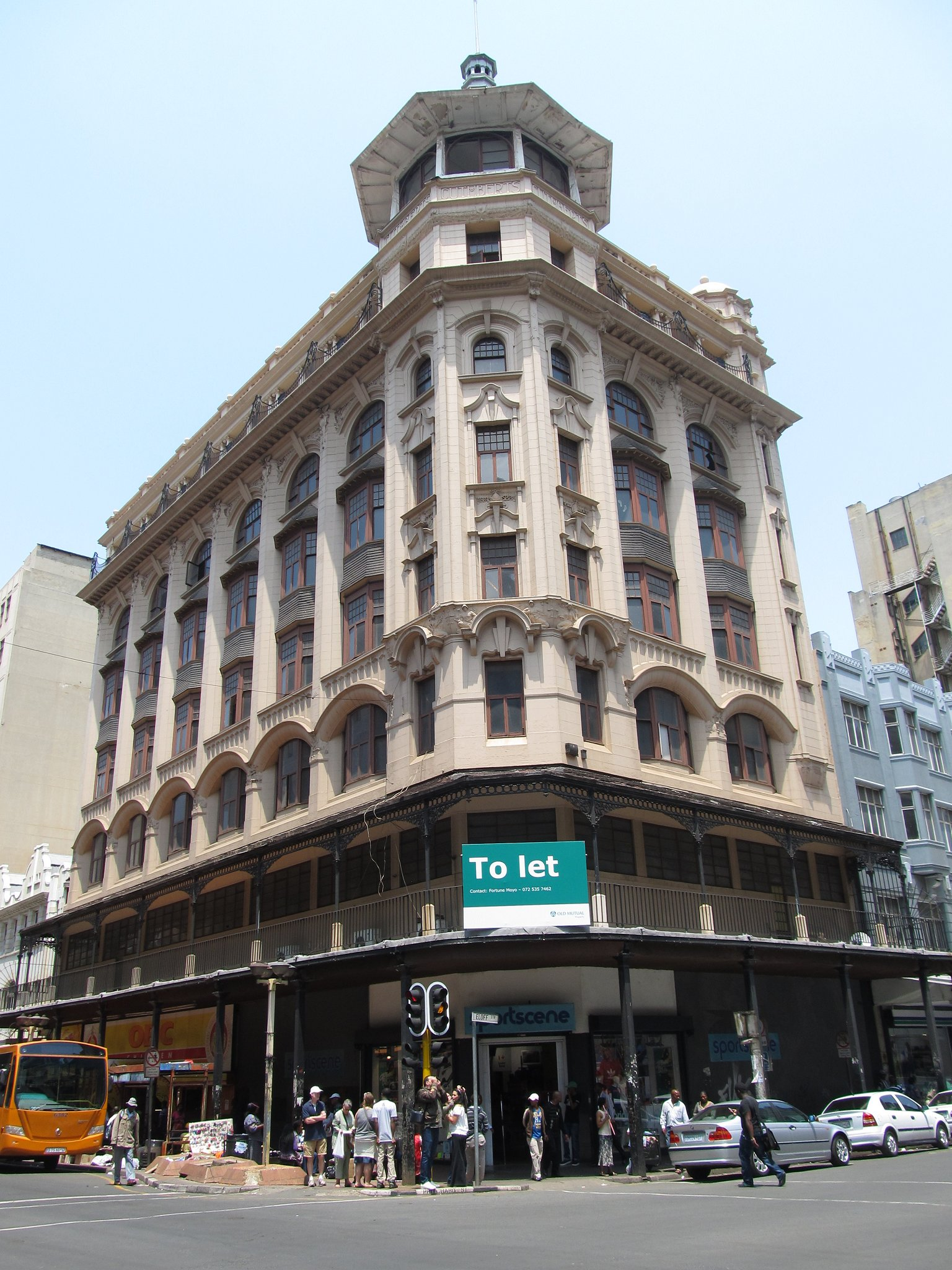
- The Cuthberts building cnr Pritchard and Eloff str Johannesburg
- Interactive map of Cuthberts Building

General information
- Status: Completed
- Type: Business-use
- Location: Johannesburg, South Africa
- Coordinates: 26.2032°S 28.0435°E
- Completed: 1904

Height
- Roof: 102 metres (335 ft)

Technical details
- Floor count: 4

Design and construction
- Architects: W H Stucke & W E Bannister

The Cuthberts Building is a Victorian style building found in the city of Johannesburg. The building was designed by architects Stucke & Bannister. Construction of the building began in 1903 and completed in 1904. It rapidly became a major landmark in the mining town and was declared a National Monument on 27 June 1986.
