= Subterranea Britannica =

Club based in the UK, interested in underground structures

Subterranea Britannica is a British organization devoted to the study and exploration of man-made underground structures, including former nuclear bunkers.

The organization was founded in 1974 by Sylvia Beamon, who was the first Secretary of the organization and served as its chair between 1977 and 1984. Subsequently, Paul Sowan acted as chair of the organization for a 20-year period.

Originally dedicated to sites in the United Kingdom, Subterranea Britannica now operates throughout Europe and in the United States, and they now list sites throughout Europe on their website. It operates on a budget of around £60,000.
