= Culbertson (name) =

Origin
- Language: English
- Region of origin: British Isles

Other names
- Variant forms: Culbert, Colbert, Colbertson, Culberts, Colberts, Coulbert, Culbart, Culbirt

Culbertson is an English language patronymic surname of Norman French origin. Its oldest public record dates to 1066 in Cheshire and Lancashire. People with the name include:

- Anne Virginia Culbertson (1857–1918), American writer
- Brian Culbertson, American smooth jazz musician
- Clarence B. Culbertson, American politician
- Clive Culbertson, founder of The Order of Druids in Ulster, Northern Ireland
- Edgar Culbertson, U.S. coast guardsman, Coast Guard Medal Recipient
- Ely Culbertson, American contract bridge player, author and promoter
- Frank L. Culbertson Jr., American astronaut
- Henry N. Culbertson (1860–1943), American farmer and politician
- James B. Culbertson (1938–2025), American diplomat
- John Culbertson (economist) (1921–2001), American economist
- John J. Culbertson, former 5th Marine Regiment sniper and author of 13 Cent Killers: The 5th Marine Snipers in Vietnam
- John T. Culbertson Jr. (1891–1982), American jurist
- Josephine Culbertson (1898–1956), American bridge player
- Michael Simpson Culbertson, American clergyman and missionary in China
- Philip Culbertson, Producer and Guitarist in The Damsons
- Rod Culbertson, British actor
- Steve Culbertson, American, President & CEO of Youth Service America
- Tim Culbertson, American Actor & Stuntman
- William Constantine Culbertson, US Congressman from Pennsylvania
- William Culbertson (businessman), American millionaire
- William Culbertson III, American, fifth President of the Moody Bible Institute

== See also ==
- Culberson (disambiguation)
