= Crayke =

Village and civil parish in North Yorkshire, England

Coordinates: 54°07′39″N 1°08′32″W

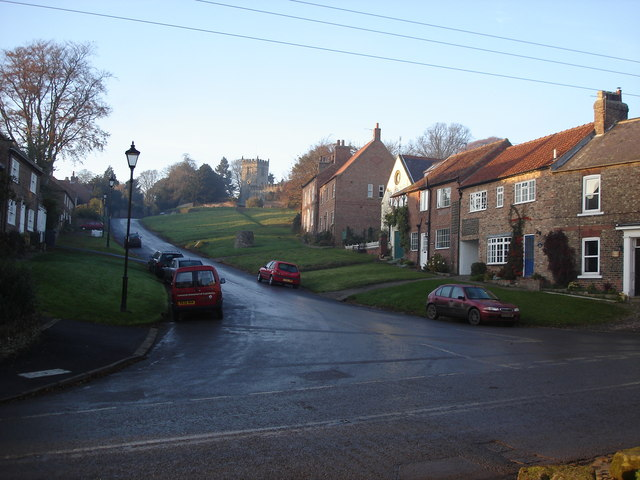
- Church Hill and St Cuthbert's Church

- Location within North Yorkshire
- Population: 410 (2011 census)
- OS grid reference: SE560707
- Civil parish: Crayke
- Unitary authority: North Yorkshire
- Ceremonial county: North Yorkshire
- Region: Yorkshire and the Humber
- Country: England
- Sovereign state: United Kingdom
- Post town: YORK
- Postcode district: YO61
- Police: North Yorkshire
- Fire: North Yorkshire
- Ambulance: Yorkshire
- UK Parliament: Thirsk and Malton

Crayke is a village and civil parish in North Yorkshire, England, located about 2 miles (3.2 km) east of Easingwold.

== Etymology ==
The name Crayke is of Brittonic origin, derived from the neo-Brittonic Cumbric crẹ:g, meaning "a crag" or "prominent rock" (Welsh craig). This derivation may refer to the topography associated with the Northumbrian monastery at Crayke.

== History ==
There is evidence that there has been a settlement here since the Anglo-Saxon Heptarchy. The village is named in the Domesday Book of 1086 as Crec, part of the Yarlestre hundred and noted as belonging to the Bishop of Durham.

The seventh-century King Ecgfrið granted Crayke to the church in 685 to be used by Cuthbert on his visits to York, to which end Cuthbert founded a monastery here. Cuthbert died in 687AD. The monk Æðiluulf wrote a poem Carmen de Abbatibus between 803 and 821 about the history of his monastery, and some scholars propose that the monastery, which was in the circle of Lindisfarne, was in Crayke. (For instance, Michael Lapidge in Anglo-Latin Literature 600–899, Hambledon Press, London 1996) According to the chronicler Symeon, the Northumbrian King Ælla appropriated Crayke and used it as his headquarters during the unsuccessful campaign against the Danes in 867. He also reports that when the congregation of St Cuthbert was wandering homeless during the seven-year period 875–882 the monks remained four months at Crayke.

In Norman times the Bishops of Durham constructed a castle over the monastic cemetery, though no traces now remain.

Links with Cuthbert and the bishopric of Durham are recognised in the dedication of the 1436 Anglican church to St Cuthbert, and the naming of the pub as the Durham Ox, (an allusion to the foundation myth of Durham).

The parish was formerly a detached part of County Durham (until 1844), due to its connection with St Cuthbert and the Diocese of Durham, which owned Crayke Castle.

== Governance ==
The village lies within the Thirsk and Malton parliamentary constituency, having previously been in the Vale of York UK Parliament constituency. From 1974 to 2023 it was part of the Hambleton District. It is now administered by the unitary North Yorkshire Council, forming part of its Easingwold electoral division.

The Parish Council is made of seven councillors including the Chair.

== Geography ==
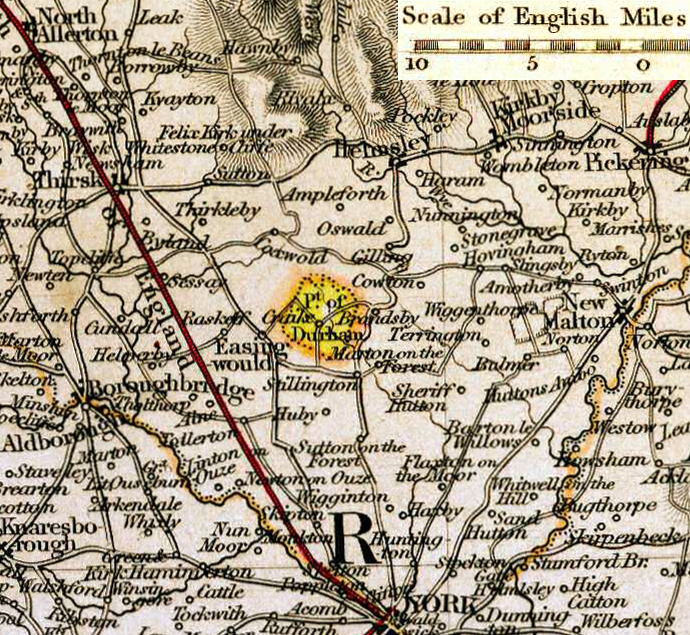
The region around Crayke shown as an exclave of Durham, in Betts's Family Atlas, 1846.

The village is at an elevation of 368 feet (112 m) at its highest point. The nearest settlements are Easingwold 2.51 miles (4.04 km) to the south-west; Stillington 2.1 miles (3.4 km) to the south-east; Brandsby 2 miles (3.2 km) to the north-east and Oulston 2.8 miles (4.5 km) to the north. The River Foss lies just 1 mile (1.6 km) to the east of the village.

According to the 1881 census the population of the village was 501. In the 2001 UK Census the population was recorded as 390, of which 315 were over the age of sixteen and 206 of those were in employment. There are 168 dwellings of which 102 were detached.

The village is served by the Easingwold to York bus route as well as a School Bus to Easingwold School. There is a public house and several local businesses in the village. There is a sports and leisure club on the outskirts where tennis and cricket are played. A farmers' market is held on the last Saturday of each month.

== Education ==
Primary education is available in the village at Crayke Primary School. The school lies within the Easingwold School catchment area for Secondary education.

== Religion ==
In the Dark Ages, Crayke was home to Echa of Crayke, an eighth century Anglo-Saxon Saint, priest and monk-hermit, known for his holiness, healing and prophetic gifting. According to the York Annals, he died 767AD, and his feast day is 5 May. He is known from the Hagiography of the Secgan Manuscript, and the poem on the Saints of York by Saint Alcuin.

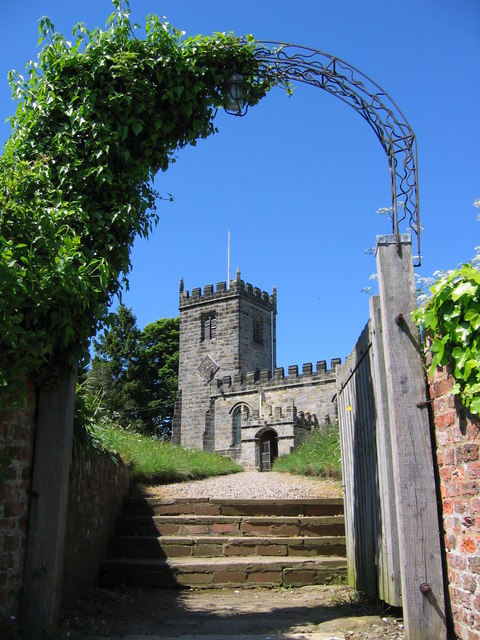
St. Cuthbert's Church, Crayke

There is a church in the village dedicated to St Cuthbert. It was so named following the time of the Danish invasions, when the body of St Cuthbert was unearthed and travelled around the north of England to protect it. The monks rested with his body at Crayke for a time. The present building was erected in 1490 in the Perpendicular style.

In the 19th century there were Wesleyan and Primitive Methodist chapels in the village as well as a Catholic chapel, all now disused.

William Ralph Inge, author, Anglican priest, professor of divinity at Cambridge, and dean of St Paul's Cathedral, was born in Crayke in 1860.

== Notable buildings ==
The village is the site of a 15th-century castle. The Grade I listed building was constructed around 1450.

There are 28 Grade II listed buildings in the village, including the Brandsby Royal Observer Corps monitoring post that operated from 1964 to 1991 at Zion Hill Farm on Key Lane. Its purpose was to monitor radioactive fallout in the event of a nuclear war. It was built underground to hold a staff of three who could live self-sufficiently for three weeks. It reported to No 20 Group headquarters in York. The 17th-century Crayke Manor is Grade II* listed.
