= Culberson =

Culberson may refer to:

== Places ==
- Culberson County, Texas
- Culberson, North Carolina

== People with the surname ==
- Aubert Culberson Dunn (1896–1987), American politician from Mississippi
- Charles Allen Culberson (1855–1925), American politician from Texas
- Charlie Culberson (born 1989), American baseball player
- Chicita F. Culberson (born 1931), American lichenologist
- David B. Culberson (1830–1900), American politician from Texas
- Eric Culberson (born 1966), American musician
- John Culberson (born 1956), American politician from Texas
- Leon Culberson (1919–1989), American baseball player
- Quinton Culberson (born 1985), American football player
- Sarah Culberson (born 1976), American philanthropist and Mende princess
- Winfield Culberson Dunn (born 1927), American politician from Tennessee
- William Louis Culberson (1929–2003), American lichenologist

== Other uses ==
- 26990 Culbertson, a main-belt asteroid

== See also ==
- Culbertson (name), a surname
